= Abortion in Europe =

Comparative overview of abortion law and practice

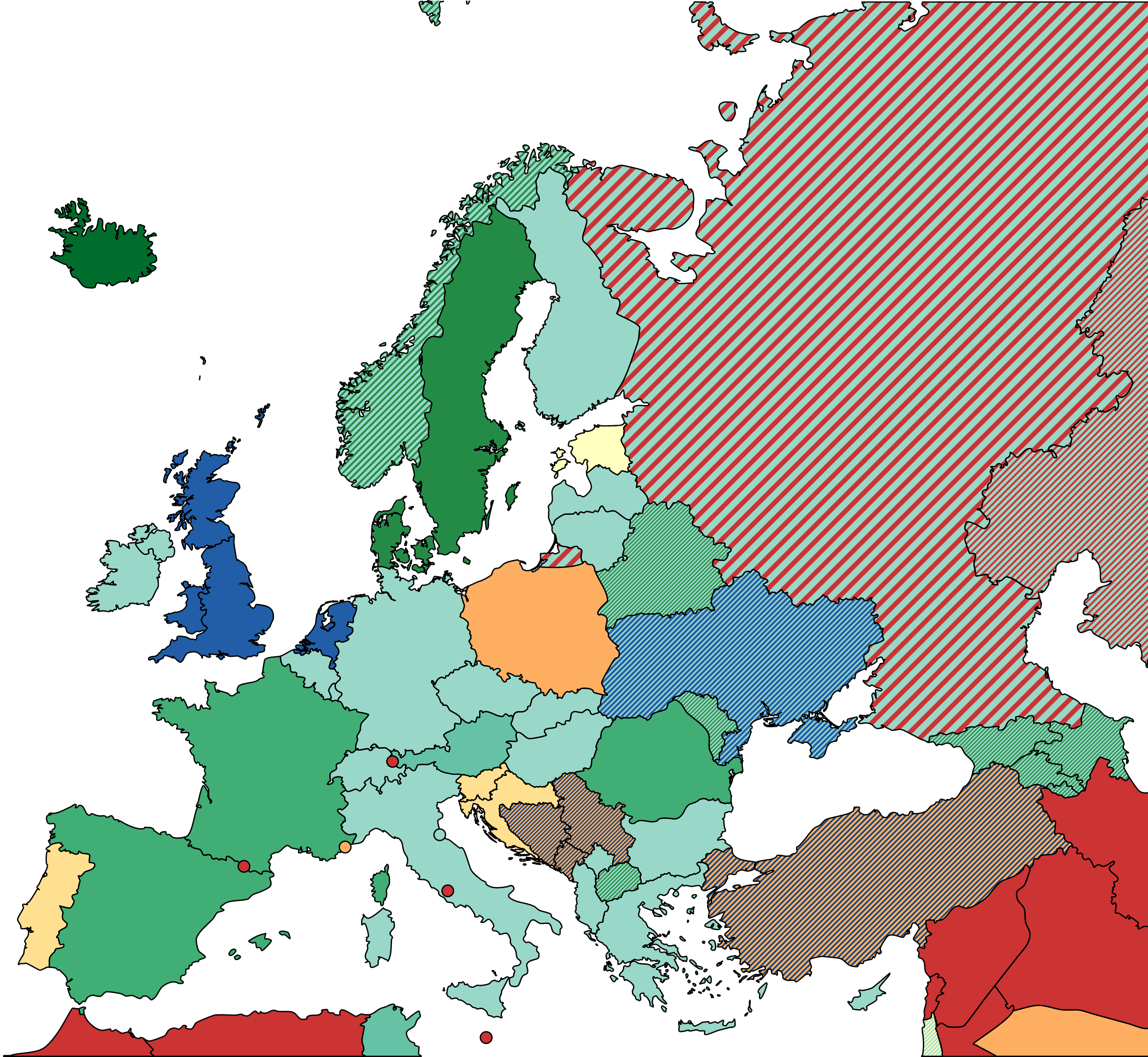
Map showing the legality of abortion on request in Europe, based on available information in 2022. Total ban or prohibited Only available in cases of rape, incest or the health of the mother Legal to term limit of: 10 weeks 11 weeks 12 weeks 13 weeks (3 months) 14 weeks 18 weeks (4 months) 20 weeks 24 weeks (5½ months) 12–28 weeks 12 weeks (or later if authorised) 10 weeks (or later if authorised) 12 weeks (elective procedure) Must be approved by committee

Abortion in Europe varies considerably between countries and territories due to differing national laws and policies on its legality, availability of the procedure, and alternative forms of support for pregnant women and their families.

In most European countries, abortion is generally permitted within a term limit below fetal viability (e.g. 12 weeks in Germany and 12 weeks and 6 days in Italy, or 14 weeks in France and Spain), although a wide range of exceptions permit abortion later in the pregnancy. The longest term limits – in terms of gestation – are in the United Kingdom and in the Netherlands, both at 24 weeks of gestation.

Abortion is subsidized or fully funded in many European countries. Grounds for abortion are highly restricted in Poland and in the smaller jurisdictions of Monaco, Liechtenstein and Malta, and abortion is prohibited in Andorra and Vatican City. In France and Luxembourg, abortion is enshrined as a constitutional right.

The European Court of Human Rights, summarising its abortion-related case law, in the Vo v France ruling in 2004, noted the "diversity of views on the point at which life begins, of legal cultures and of national standards of protection" and therefore, in a European context, the nation-state "has been left with considerable discretion in the matter."

== History ==
Abortions have taken place either within or outside the law throughout European history, alongside initiatives by opponents of abortion to provide alternatives where a pregnancy is difficult or unwanted. These have included kinship care by families and friendship circles in every culture, the adoption and fostering of alumni children in Roman society, and the oblation of children who were given into the care of monastic institutions if a family was unable to provide adequate care. In the modern era, formal support services have included adoption, fostering and foundling hospitals.

=== Ancient Greece and Rome ===
Debates around abortion, pregnancy and the beginning of life were common in Greek and Roman philosophy and medicine, and would have also been known in cultures which have not left a written record. The medical writer Soranus of Ephesus wrote in the early 2nd century AD:

A contraceptive differs from an abortive, for the first does not let conception take place, while the latter destroys what has been conceived ... But a controversy has arisen. For one party banishes abortives ... because it is the specific task of medicine to guard and preserve what has been engendered by nature. The other party prescribes abortives, but with discrimination ...

Much of what is known about the methods and practice of abortion in Greek and Roman history comes from early classical texts. Abortion, as a gynecological procedure, was primarily the province of women who were either midwives or well-informed laypeople. In his Theaetetus, Plato mentions a midwife's ability to induce abortion in the early stages of pregnancy. A fragment attributed to the poet Lysias "suggests that abortion was a crime in Athens against the husband, if his wife was pregnant when he died, since his unborn child could have claimed the estate."

Tertullian, a 2nd- and 3rd-century Christian theologian, described surgical implements which were used in a procedure similar to modern dilation and evacuation.

=== Development of Christian perspectives ===
An early Christian understanding of preventing abortion and infanticide was outlined in the 1st century Didache, which was published in Syria or Palestine and became widely available in Europe with the growth of the early Church.

Restrictions on abortion have generally corresponded with laws and societies influenced by Christianity or where a substantial number of health professionals refuse to perform abortion due to a personal conscientious objection which is often, but not always, related to religious faith.

Pope John Paul II outlined Catholic teaching on abortion and support for a definition of life beginning at conception in his 1995 encyclical Evangelium vitae and through the 1992 Catechism of the Catholic Church:

Human life must be respected and protected absolutely from the moment of conception. From the first moment of his existence, a human being must be recognized as having the rights of a person – among which is the inviolable right of every innocent being to life.

Eastern Orthodox Christianity has similarly strongly condemned abortion. The Russian Orthodox Church's Social Concept states:

Since the ancient time the Church has viewed deliberate abortion as a grave sin. The canons equate abortion with murder. This assessment is based on the conviction that the conception of a human being is a gift of God.

Following the Reformation, Protestants also affirmed life before birth and opposed abortion, although individual Protestant churches have adopted differing positions on the grounds on which abortion should or should not be permitted. John Calvin, for example, wrote:

The fetus, though enclosed in the womb of its mother, is already a human being, and it is almost a monstrous crime to rob it of the life which it has not yet begun to enjoy.

The bishops of the Anglican Communion expressed opposition to abortion at the 1930 Lambeth Conference. The 1958 Lambeth Conference's Family in Contemporary Society report affirmed the following position on abortion and was commended by the 1968 Conference:

In the strongest terms Christians reject the practice of induced abortion or infanticide, which involves the killing of a life already conceived (as well as a violation of the personality of the mother), save at the dictate of strict and undeniable medical necessity ... the sacredness of life is, in Christian eyes, an absolute which should not be violated.

=== Development of other faith and secular perspectives ===
Islamic and Jewish perspectives on abortion differ according to the scholarship followed. All Islamic schools of thought agree that abortion is recommended when the mother's life is in danger as the mother's life is paramount. The author of Sahih al-Bukhari (Book of Hadith) writes that the unborn child is believed to become a living soul after 120 days of gestation.

Abortion has been questioned from a secular perspective, drawing on modern understandings of science and human rights, although the potential to legalise and increase the availability of abortion was supported by secular and libertarian feminists and socialists from the mid-19th century onwards. The 1871 Paris Commune, for example, declared:

The submission of the children and the mother to the authority of the father, who prepares the submission of each one to the authority of the chief, is pronounced dead. The couple consents freely to seek common pleasure. The Commune proclaims freedom of birth: the right to sexual information from childhood, the right to abortion, the right to contraception. As the products cease to be the property of their parents. They live together in their home and run their own lives.

=== Eastern Europe ===
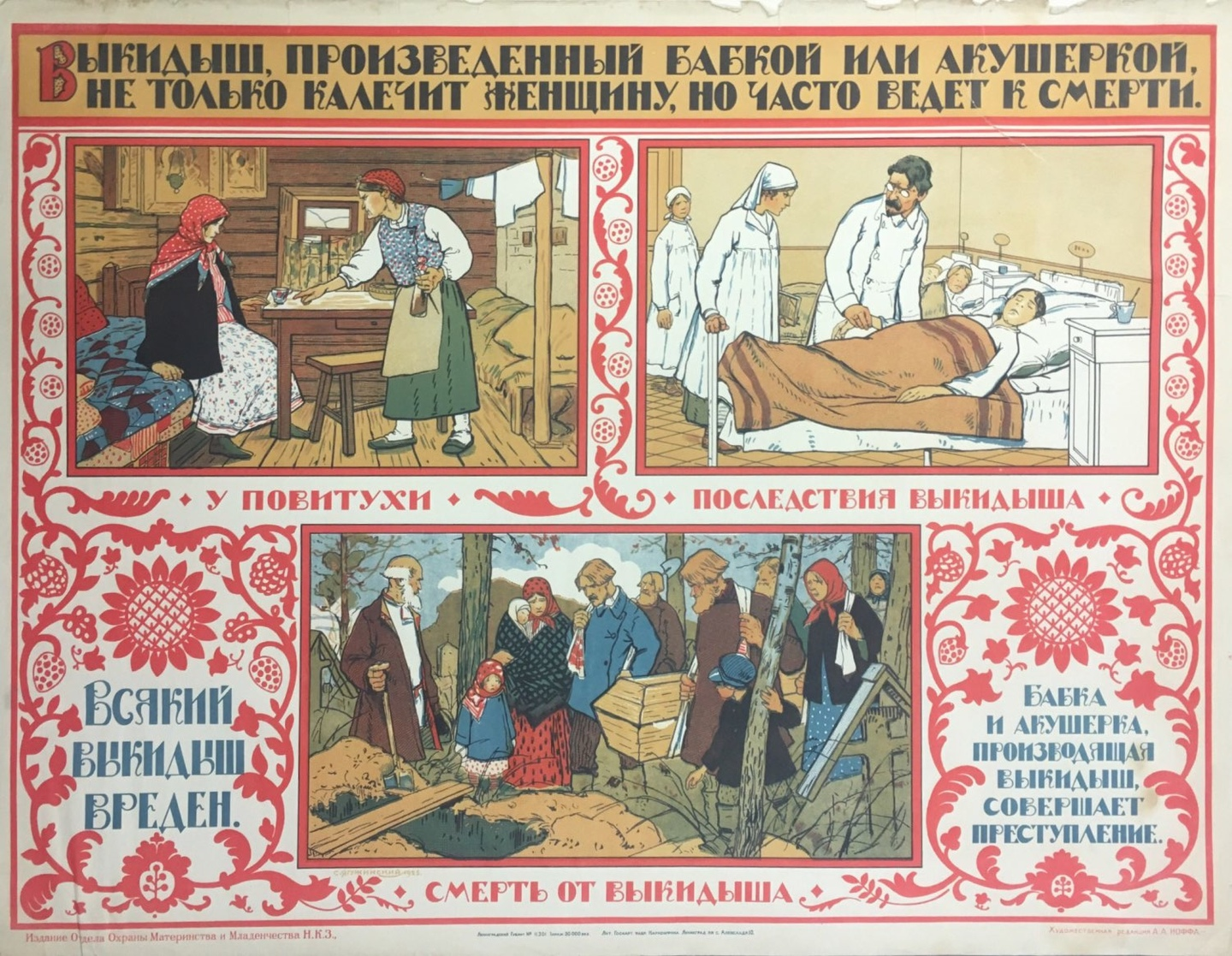
Soviet poster, from 1925, warning against abortions induced without medical care.

The Russian Soviet Federative Socialist Republic was the first country in Europe to legalise abortion in 1920 and was followed by other Soviet Union republics. However, between 1936 and 1955, abortion in the Soviet Union was highly restricted due to medical concerns and its impact on population growth.

Under eugenics laws in Nazi Germany, abortion was severely punished for women considered to be Aryan (racially superior). However, abortion was permitted on wider and more explicit grounds if the unborn child was believed to be deformed or disabled or if a termination otherwise was deemed desirable on eugenic or racial grounds, including forced abortion on Polish and Jewish women.

Abortion law became more liberalised in Eastern Europe in the 1950s after the installation of communist regimes across the Eastern Bloc. The reintroduction of abortion in Soviet law in 1955 was accompanied by similar changes in:

- Hungary – 1953
- Poland and Bulgaria – 1956
- Czechoslovakia and Romania – 1957

After the fall of communism, most of Eastern Europe continued with liberal abortion laws except for Poland, where abortion is allowed only in cases of risk to the life or health of the pregnant woman or when the pregnancy is a result of rape or incest. Abortion in cases of an abnormality in an unborn child was ruled unconstitutional by the Supreme Court of Poland in 2020.

While abortion is more widely available in Hungary and Slovakia, the Constitution of Slovakia describes human life as "worthy of protection already before birth" and the Constitution of Hungary states that "embryonic and foetal life shall be subject to protection from the moment of conception."

=== Scandinavia ===
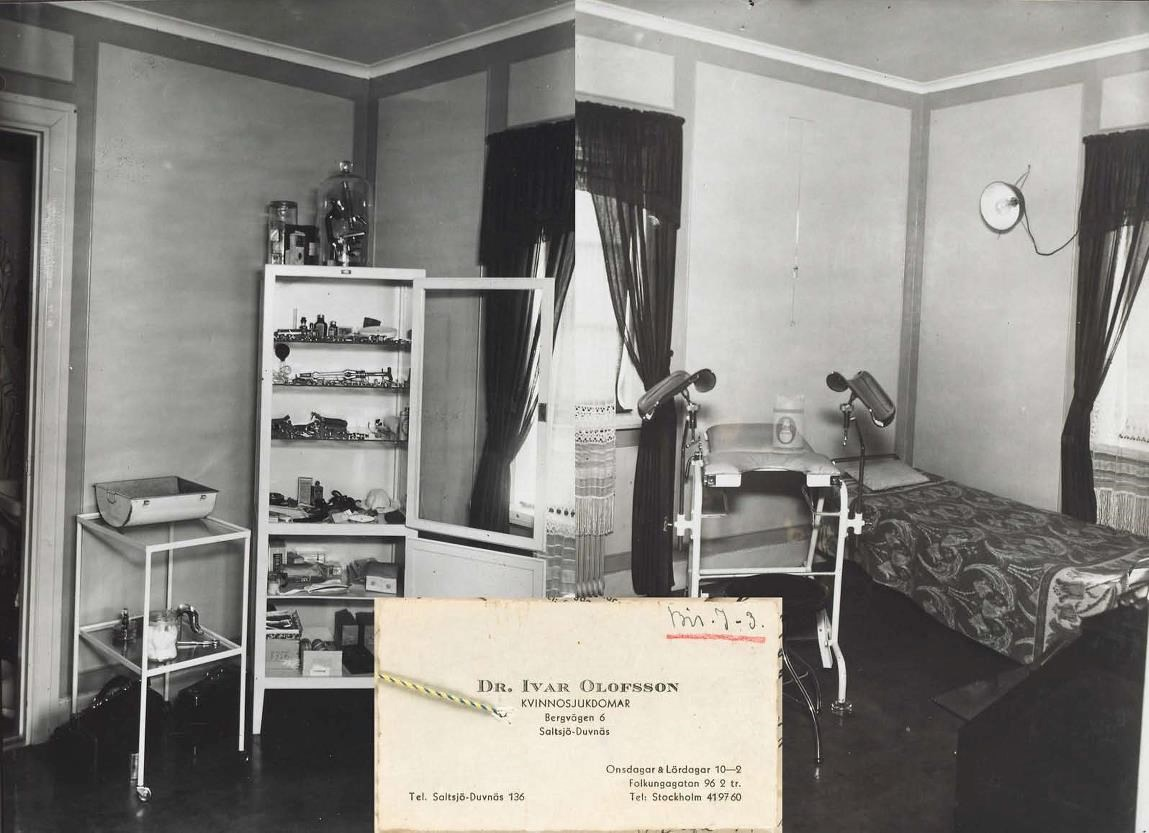
A clinic in Sweden where unlawful abortions were performed during the 1930s.

Sweden was the first liberal democracy in Europe to legalise abortion, in 1938; this move was followed by the introduction of limited abortion laws in Denmark in 1939, Finland in 1950, and Norway in 1964. More liberal abortion laws were introduced in Norway in 1964, Finland in 1970, and Denmark and Iceland in 1973.

Greenland has followed Denmark's liberal policy on abortion, and has at times experienced more abortions than live births taking place, whereas the Faroe Islands have maintained a more conservative approach; the issue was transferred to the Faroese Parliament (Løgting) in 2018.

The Parliament of Norway (Storting) legislated in 2015 that an unborn child is presumed to be viable at 21 weeks and 6 days unless there are specific reasons otherwise. The law was clarified as survival after abortion was recorded in some cases at 22 or 23 weeks of gestation.

=== Western Europe ===
The Abortion Act 1967, in Great Britain, was the first major liberalisation of abortion law in Western Europe. English law had previously allowed for abortion on limited grounds under the Infant Life Preservation Act 1929 (also protecting the life of the pregnant woman) and from 1938 under the Bourne judgment in cases where a pregnancy would result in a pregnant woman becoming a "mental and physical wreck". Abortion continued to be limited to those grounds in Northern Ireland as the issue was devolved to the Northern Ireland Parliament.

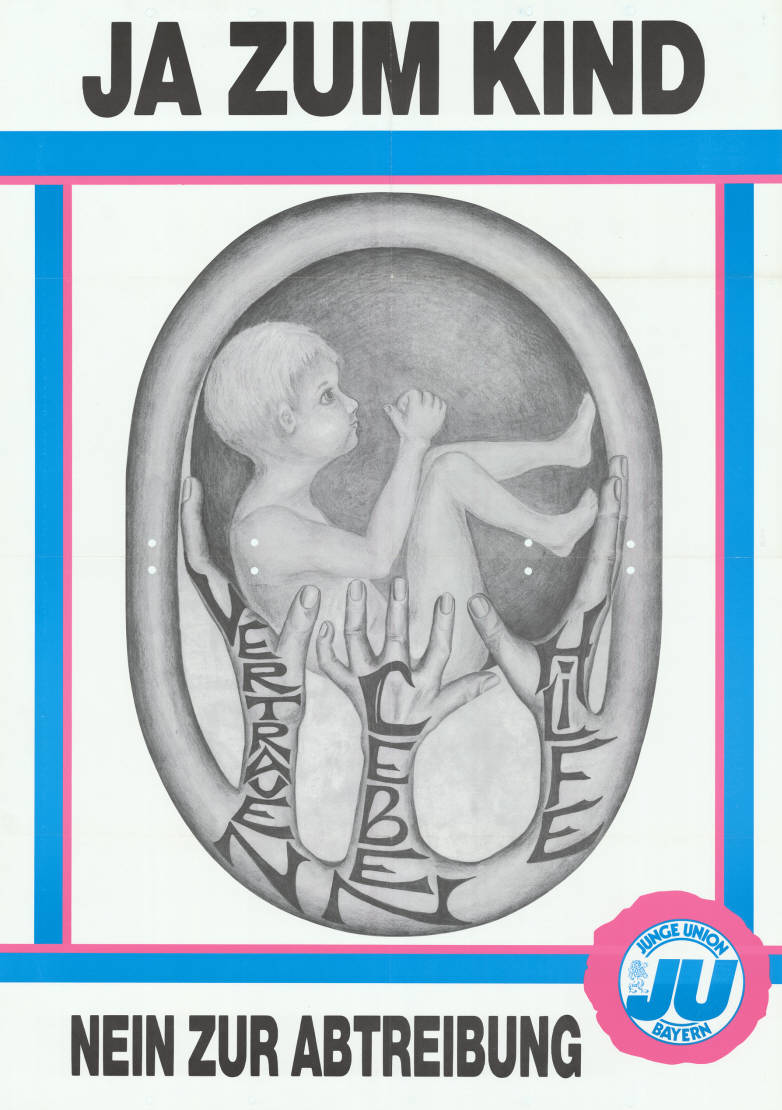
'Yes to the child, trust, life, help, no to abortion', poster from Bavaria, 1987.

Abortion on request during the first 12 weeks of a pregnancy was permitted in East Germany from 1972. The same policy was enacted in West Germany in 1974 but was ruled unconstitutional in 1975 by the Federal Constitutional Court as it infringed on the right to life of the unborn child. A revised law, with restrictions on abortion, was introduced in 1976.

The court ruled that a "life developing in the mother's womb is under the protection of the Constitution as an independent legal interest" and that the "protective duty of the State prohibits not only direct governmental encroachments upon the developing life but, in addition, commands the State to adopt a protective and encouraging role in regard to this life." This obligation was balanced with the rights of the mother – therefore permitting abortion in certain circumstances – although with the protection of fetal life, in principle, taking precedence.

The law on abortion in France was liberalised in 1975 and the changes in France and Germany were followed by similar changes in the law elsewhere in Europe:

- Austria – 1975
- Italy and Luxembourg – 1978
- Netherlands and Portugal – 1984
- Spain – 1985
- Greece – 1986
- Belgium – 1990
- Switzerland – 2002

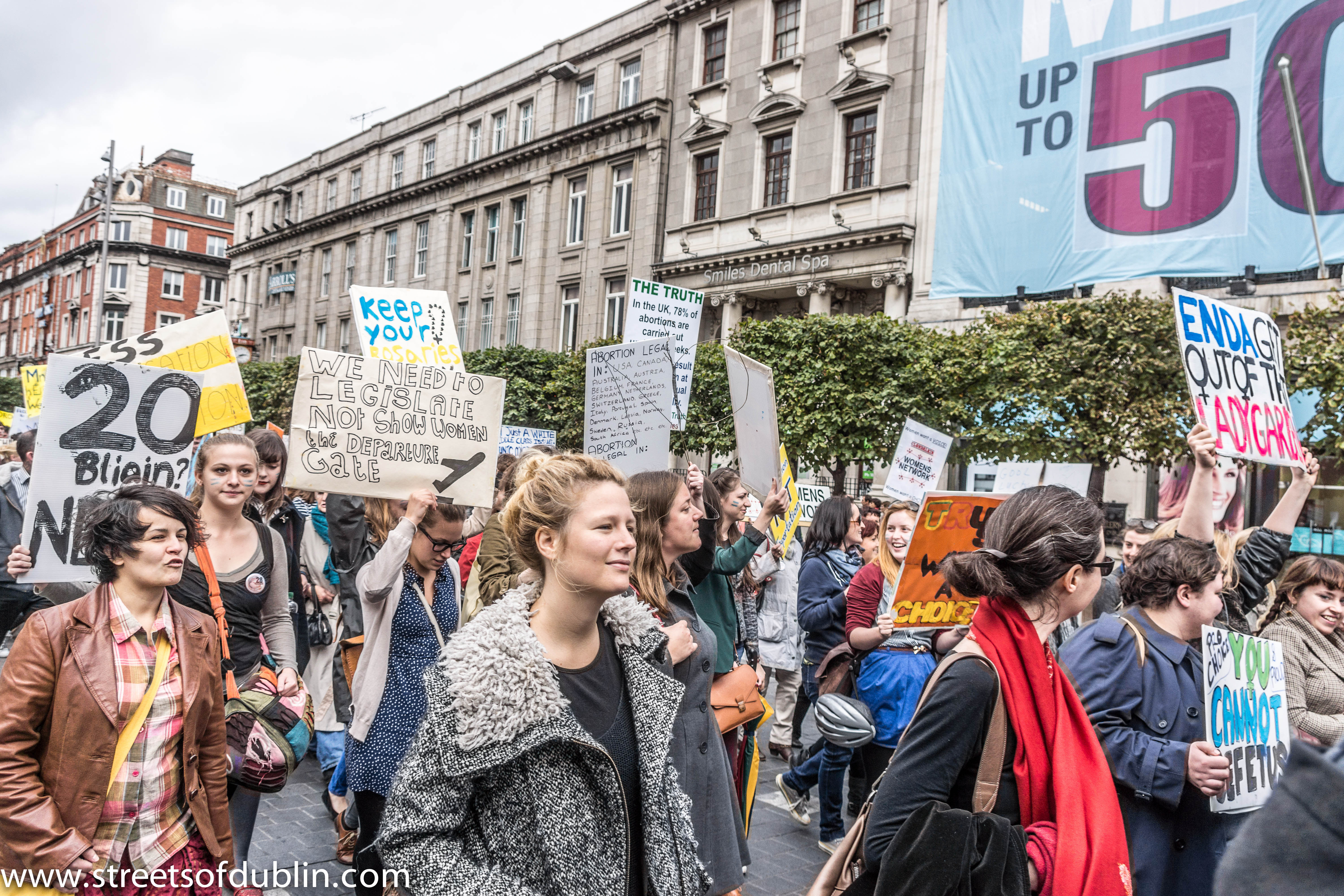
March for abortion rights in Dublin, 2012.

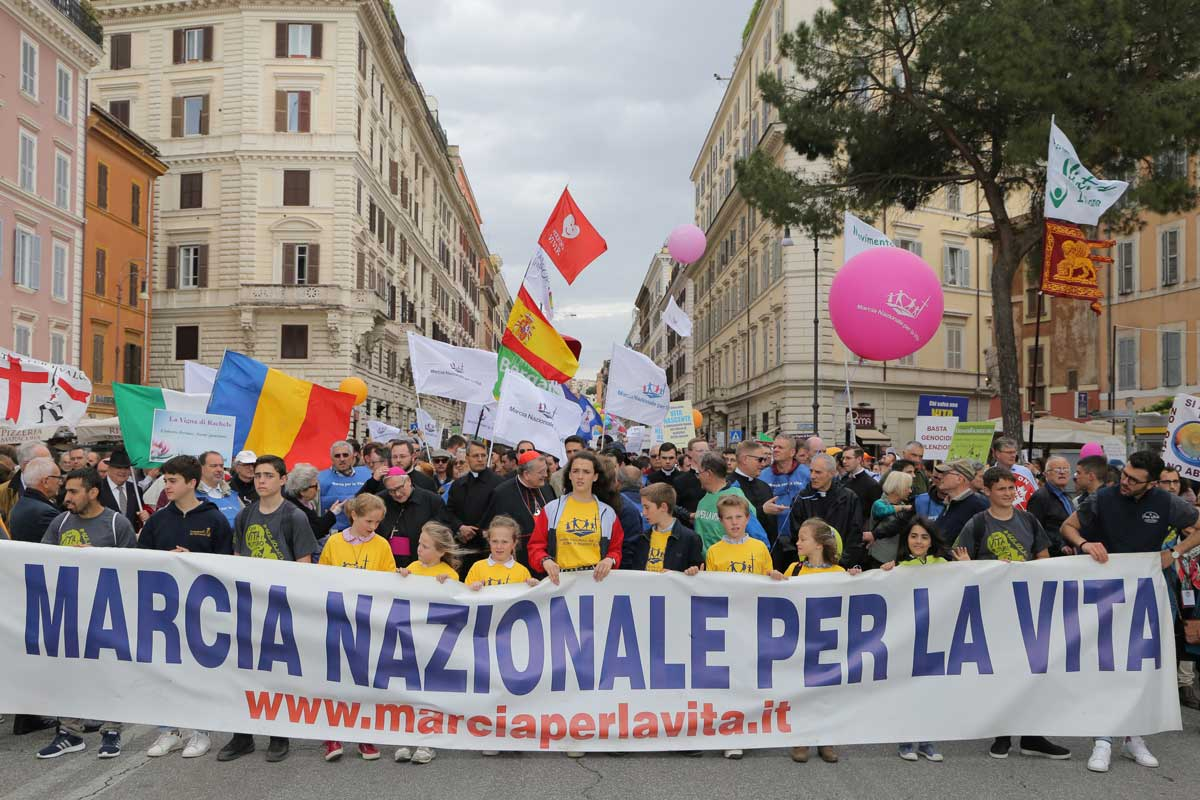
Anti-abortion demonstration in Rome, 2019.

King Baudouin of Belgium, a devout Catholic, stepped aside from his role as monarch due to his conscientious objection to abortion legislation in 1990; the law was approved by the Government of Belgium (acting as head of state) and Baudouin resumed his reign one day later. King Baudouin's letter on the issue, to his then Prime Minister, Wilfried Martens, is displayed in the BELvue Museum in Brussels.

The Eighth Amendment of the Constitution of Ireland, approved by referendum in 1983, and the subsequent Protection of Life During Pregnancy Act 2013 limited abortion to cases where the pregnant woman's life was endangered. The law on abortion changed significantly to a very liberal policy in Ireland when, in 2018, the Eighth Amendment was repealed by a subsequent referendum. The resulting law allowed for abortion on request up to 12 weeks of pregnancy, and on more limited grounds at later stages.

Abortion in Northern Ireland was liberalised in 2019 and 2020, from being permitted in cases of "risk of real and serious adverse effect on ... physical or mental health, which is either long term or permanent" to being available on request up to 12 weeks and on further grounds later in pregnancy.

In March 2024, France became the first country to explicitly include the right to abortion within its Constitution. This was characterised as a response to the overturning of Roe v. Wade in the U.S. in 2022. In March 2026, Luxembourg became the second country in the world to constitutionally safeguard abortion access.

== Grounds for abortion by jurisdiction ==
In most European nation-states and other territories, there is a legally defined term limit before which abortion is more available than afterwards. An elective abortion before the term limit may, in some cases, be carried out on request without a medical indication by the pregnant woman, or under certain conditions.

The grounds on which abortion is, or is not, available vary according to differences in national laws, policies and practices, which may include:

- circumstances in which abortion is allowed after the first trimester of a pregnancy;
- whether or not counselling or a waiting time (known as Bedenkzeit in Germany) between the request and the requested termination is required;
- availability and cost of medicines or equipment for the procedure;
- levels of support or objection from medical and other healthcare professionals (for example, widespread conscientious objection in Italy);
- whether the parents of a girl requesting an abortion are required to give consent for (or be informed of) an abortion to end an under-age pregnancy.

In countries and territories where abortion is more restricted, women regularly travel to neighbouring countries with more liberal laws. For example, almost 8,000 women from the island of Ireland travelled to England and Wales for abortions each year in the early 2000s; however, this number decreased, year on year, to around 4,000 in 2018, and to less than 1,000 per year following changes in the law in Ireland and Northern Ireland. In the European microstates of Andorra, Liechtenstein, and Monaco there are heavy restrictions, with it being fully illegal in the first two. San Marino had similar restrictions until 2022. Those seeking abortion must travel to other countries, although such travel is illegal for those in Andorra and Liechtenstein.

At present, a 10-week term limit is accepted in law in countries which were formerly part of Yugoslavia, whereas the 12 to 13 week limits has been adopted in many middle European jurisdictions (including former republics of the Soviet Union and also most central European countries). Higher term limits are more common in the Western part of Europe and are in place in France (14 weeks), Spain, Sweden (18 weeks), Iceland (22 weeks), and the Netherlands (24 weeks).

Countries with no formal term limit in law include those with more restrictive laws and Great Britain, which has a strongly liberal law and policy; almost 89% abortions in England and Wales in 2021 were undertaken before 10 weeks of gestation, 1 per cent after 20 weeks, and 0.1% after 24 weeks. There are ongoing attempts to fully decriminalise abortion in Great Britain.

=== National abortion laws ===
Name	Elective term limit	Permitted further grounds
Albania	12 weeks	At any stage: Risk to life or health of pregnant woman; Severe (incurable) malformation of unborn child; Up to 22 weeks: Social reasons; Pregnancy as a result of sexual crime
Andorra	Not applicable	Double effect principle – saving the life of the woman may have the unintended consequence of ending a pregnancy.
Armenia	12 weeks	Up to 22 weeks: Pregnant woman deprived of maternal rights during pregnancy; Divorce; Pregnancy as a result of rape; Medical grounds related to the health of pregnant woman; Congenital abnormality in unborn child
Austria	13 weeks	Immediate danger to life of pregnant woman; Serious danger to life or to the physical or mental health of pregnant woman; Serious danger of serious physical or mental defect in unborn child; Pregnant woman became pregnant when under 14 years of age
Azerbaijan	12 weeks	At any stage: Child with disabilities in family; Disability of husband; Up to 22 weeks: Death of husband during pregnancy; Court order depriving or restricting parental rights; Refugee or internally displaced person status; Lack of housing; Recognition of woman or husband as unemployed; Presence of woman or husband in place of imprisonment; Extra-marital pregnancy; Dissolution of marriage during pregnancy; Pregnancy as a result of rape; Multiple children in family (5 or more); Azerbaijan has high levels of sex-selective abortion, resulting in the birth of more sons than daughters.
Belarus	12 weeks	At any stage: Risk to life of pregnant woman; Up to 22 weeks: Imprisonment of pregnant woman or husband; Severe disability in husband; Additional child with a disability since childhood; Death of husband during pregnancy; Divorce during pregnancy; Court decision to remove parental rights; Pregnancy as a result of rape; Family has more than three children; Unemployment of pregnant woman or husband; Refugee status
Belgium	12 weeks	At any stage: Serious threat to life of pregnant woman; Child will suffer from incurable disease if born (based on current scientific knowledge)
Bosnia and Herzegovina	10 weeks	Between 10 and 20 weeks: Risk to life and health of pregnant woman; Risk to physical or mental health of unborn child; Pregnancy as a result of sexual crime; After 20 weeks: Saving life or health of pregnant woman; Counselling before and after an abortion is required in Republika Srpska.
Bulgaria	12 weeks	Up to 20 weeks: Risk to health of pregnant woman and unborn child; At any stage: Risk to life of pregnant woman; Severe malformation in unborn child
Croatia	10 weeks	At any stage: Risk to life of pregnant woman; Risk of damage to health of pregnant woman; Risk of severe congenital physical or mental defects in unborn child; Pregnancy as a result of sexual crime; A pregnancy may not be terminated if it is demonstrated that this could seriously harm the health of the pregnant woman.
Cyprus	12 weeks	At any stage: Risk to physical or mental health of pregnant woman; Up to 19 weeks: Pregnancy as a result of sexual crime; Up to 24 weeks: Severe abnormality in unborn child
Czech Republic	12 weeks	At any stage: Danger to the life of pregnant woman; Serious malformation in unborn child; Unborn child considered 'incapable of life'; Up to 24 weeks: Genetic grounds for abortion
Denmark	18 weeks	In post 18 weeks : Risk to life of pregnant woman; Risk of severe deterioration in physical or mental health of pregnant woman; Risk of deterioration of the health of pregnant woman due to existing or potential physical or mental illness (or as a consequence of other conditions); Danger that unborn child will be affected by serious physical or mental disorder; Pregnant woman considered incapable of giving proper care to child due to physical or mental disability; Pregnant woman considered incapable (for the time) of giving proper care to child due to her youth or immaturity; Pregnancy, childbirth or care of child considered to constitute a serious burden to pregnant woman (which cannot otherwise be averted); Pregnancy as a result of a criminal act
Estonia	12 weeks	Up to 22 weeks: Risk to health of pregnant woman; Severe mental or physical health disorder in unborn child; Medical condition in pregnant woman prevents development of unborn child; Pregnant woman is under 15 years of age; Pregnant woman is over 45 years of age
Finland	12 weeks	At any stage: Risk to health of pregnant woman; Up to 20 weeks: Care of child after birth would be considerable strain for pregnant woman; Parent has medical condition that will cause difficulty in caring for child; Pregnancy as a result of sexual crime; Probable serious illness or disability in unborn child; Pregnant woman was under 17 years of age at conception; Pregnant woman was over 40 years of age at conception; Pregnant woman has previously given birth to four or more children; Up to 24 weeks: Serious illness or disability in unborn child; Permission is needed from National Supervisory Authority for Welfare and Health (Valvira) for abortions on social grounds or related to serious illness or disability in unborn child.
France	14 weeks	Serious danger to life of pregnant woman; Serious danger to health of pregnant woman; Significant probability that unborn child will be born with a serious incurable disease; The Constitution of France, as amended in 2024, guarantees the freedom of a woman "to have recourse to a voluntary termination of pregnancy".
Germany	12 weeks	Up to 12 weeks: Pregnancy as a result of criminal offence; Up to 22 weeks: Danger to life of pregnant woman; Danger of grave impairment to physical or mental health of pregnant woman; Exceptional distress (at discretion of court); All abortions must be performed by a physician.
(Georgia (country)) Georgia	12 weeks	Available after 12 weeks on medical and social grounds not specified in law but defined by the Ministry of Labour, Health Care and Social Security. Counselling is required before an abortion with a three-day waiting time. Parental consent for abortion is required in cases where a girl under 14 years of age is pregnant.
(United Kingdom) Great Britain	24 weeks (excluding Scotland)	At any stage (England, Wales, Northern Ireland): Risk to life of pregnant woman; Prevent grave permanent injury to physical or mental health of pregnant woman; Substantial risk of serious physical or mental abnormalities in unborn child; Up to 24 weeks (Scotland): Risk of injury to physical or mental health of pregnant woman; Risk of injury to physical or mental health of any existing children of family of pregnant woman
Greece	12 weeks	At any stage: Risk to life of pregnant woman; Risk of serious and continuous damage to physical or mental health of pregnant woman; Up to 19 weeks: Pregnancy as a result of rape or incest; Up to 24 weeks: Abnormality in unborn child
Hungary	12 weeks	At any stage: Risk to life of pregnant woman; Malformation in unborn child renders post-natal life impossible; Up to 12 weeks: Severe danger to health of pregnant woman; Probable severe disability or other impairment in unborn child; Pregnancy as a result of criminal act; Severe crisis situation for pregnant woman; Up to 18 weeks on grounds for 12 weeks where: Pregnant woman partly or fully incapacitated; Pregnant woman did not recognise pregnancy in time; Term limit lapsed due to failure of health institution or authority; Up to 20 weeks (and 24 weeks for delayed diagnoses): Probability of malformation in unborn child is 50% or more; The Constitution of Hungary, adopted in 2011, protects "the life of the foetus ... from the moment of conception" in its right to life and human dignity.
Iceland	22 weeks	At any stage: Risk to life of pregnant woman; Life of unborn child is not considered to be viable
(Republic of Ireland) Ireland	12 weeks	At any stage: Immediate serious risk to life or of serious harm to health of a pregnant woman (in an emergency); Condition affecting unborn child that is likely to lead to his or her death (either before, or within 28 days of, birth); Up to viability: Serious risk to life of pregnant woman; Serious risk of harm to health of pregnant woman
Italy	12 weeks and 6 days	At any stage: Serious threat to life of pregnant woman from pregnancy or childbirth; Diagnosis of pathological processes constituting serious threat to physical or mental health of pregnant woman (e.g. associated with serious abnormalities or malformations in unborn child); Up to 90 days (12 weeks and 6 days): Serious danger to physical or mental health of pregnant woman due to continuation of pregnancy, childbirth, or motherhood (in view of state of health, economic, social, or family circumstances, or the circumstances in which conception occurred). Page 2, §4, Probability of abnormalities or malformations in unborn child
Kazakhstan	12 weeks	At any stage: Risk to life of pregnant woman; Malformation in unborn child; From 12 weeks up to 22 weeks: Death of husband during pregnancy; Confinement of pregnant woman or her husband; Unemployment of pregnant woman or husband; Unmarried status of pregnant woman; Deprivation or limitation of parental rights; Pregnancy as a result of rape; Refugee or forced migrant status of pregnant woman; Disabled child in family; Divorce during pregnancy; Four or more children in family; Pregnant woman is under 18 years of age
Latvia	12 weeks	Up to 12 weeks: Pregnancy as a result of rape; Up to 22 weeks: On medical indications grounds
Liechtenstein	Not applicable	Immediate danger to life of pregnant woman; Serious danger to life or health of pregnant woman; Pregnancy as a result of sexual offence; Pregnant woman was under-age at time of conception
Lithuania	12 weeks	Up to 22 weeks: Risk to life of pregnant woman; Risk to physical health of pregnant woman; Risk to mental health of pregnant woman; Risk of malformation in unborn child
Luxembourg	12 weeks	At any stage: Serious threat to the health or life of pregnant woman; Serious threat to the health or life of unborn child
Malta	Not applicable	Up to viability: Immediate risk to life of pregnant woman from medical complication; Grave jeopardy to health of pregnant woman (which may lead to death from medical complication)
Moldova	12 weeks	Up to 22 weeks: Pregnant woman aged under 18 or over 40 years; Pregnancy as a result of rape, incest or trafficking; Divorce during pregnancy; Death of husband during pregnancy; Imprisonment of one or both spouses; Deprivation of parental rights of one or both spouses; Migrant status; Pregnant woman has 5 or more children; Pregnant woman cares for child aged under 2 years (or for one or more family members) with serious disability; Combination of lack of housing, lack of financial resources, alcohol or drug abuse, domestic violence and/or homelessness; After 22 weeks: Congenital severe malformation in unborn child considered incompatible with life (defined as an induced premature birth rather than abortion)
Monaco	Not applicable	Risk to health of pregnant woman; Pregnancy as a result of rape; Irreversible health defect in unborn child; Pregnant women living in Monaco are permitted to seek abortion outside the jurisdiction (up to 12 weeks).
Montenegro	10 weeks	Up to 20 weeks: Approval by medical committee in cases of serious disability in unborn child, pregnancy as a result of sexual crime, or difficult family circumstances; From 20 to 32 weeks: Approval by ethics committee in cases involving medical reasons or serious disability in unborn child; From 32 weeks: Risk to life of pregnant woman
Netherlands	13 weeks	Up to viability defined as 24 weeks (22 weeks in practice) where a pregnant woman attests to a state of distress, to be jointly defined by her and a doctor.
North Macedonia	12 weeks	Risk to life and health of pregnant woman; Risk to physical or mental health of unborn child; Pregnancy as a result of sexual crime; Social or economic grounds
Norway	18 weeks	Up to viability defined as 22 weeks: Pregnancy, childbirth or care of child may result in unreasonable adverse physical, mental, or economic impact on the woman; Major risk that the unborn child may suffer from serious birth defects; Pregnancy as a result of rape; The pregnant woman has a mental illness or physical disability
Poland	Not applicable	Danger to life of pregnant woman; Danger to health of pregnant woman; Pregnancy as a result of a criminal act
Portugal	10 weeks	At any stage: Unviable unborn child; Danger to life of pregnant woman; Serious and lasting danger to physical or mental health of pregnant woman; Up to 12 weeks: Danger to life of pregnant woman; Serious and lasting danger to physical or mental health of pregnant woman; Up to 16 weeks: Pregnancy as a result of sexual violence; Up to 24 weeks: Probability of incurable serious disease or congenital malformation in unborn child
Romania	14 weeks	At any stage: For therapeutic purposes in the interests of pregnant woman or unborn child; Up to 24 weeks: For therapeutic purposes in the interests (and performed by an obstetricsian or gynaecologist)
Russia	12 weeks	At any stage: Medical reasons (include severe abnormality in unborn child and condition endangering health and life of pregnant woman); Up to 22 weeks: Pregnancy as a result of rape; Imprisonment of pregnant woman; Deprivation of parental rights; Death or severe disability of husband; Social grounds (as decided by special commission)
San Marino	12 weeks	At any stage: Risk to life of pregnant woman; Up to viability: Abnormality or malformation in unborn child causing serious risk for health of pregnant woman; Pregnancy as a result of sexual crime
Serbia	10 weeks	At any stage: Risk to life or health of the woman; From 10 weeks to 20 weeks: Pregnancy as a result of sexual crime; Psychological trauma to pregnant woman; Social and economic reasons
Slovakia	12 weeks	Danger to life of pregnant woman; Danger to health of pregnant woman; Danger to healthy development of unborn child; Genetic abnormality in development of unborn child; The Constitution of Slovakia, adopted in 1992, states that human life is "worthy of protection even before birth" in its right to life.
Slovenia	10 weeks	Up to 28 weeks: Approval by medical committee; Abortions are considered stillbirths after 22 weeks.
Spain	14 weeks	Up to 22 weeks: Risk to life or health of pregnant woman; Serious abnormality in unborn child; At any stage: Malformation in unborn child deemed incompatible with life; Diagnosis of extreme or incurable disease in unborn child
Sweden	18 weeks	Up to 22 weeks: Serious medical risk to life or health of pregnant woman
Switzerland	12 weeks	Prevention of serious physical harm; Prevention of serious psychological harm
Turkey	10 weeks	Risk to life of pregnant woman; Severe impairment in unborn child
Ukraine	12 weeks	Medical reasons; Pregnancy as a result of rape
Vatican City	Not applicable	Double effect principle – saving the life of pregnant woman may have the unintended consequence of ending a pregnancy, as permitted under the Italian Penal Code in effect.

=== Territories and regions ===
The Akrotiri and Dhekelia Sovereign Base Areas of the United Kingdom on the island of Cyprus reflect the Abortion Act 1967 in policy with grounds allowing for aboriton in cases of risk to the life of the pregnant woman, grave permanent injury to her physical or mental health, risk of injury to her physical or mental health (or that of any existing children of the family) and disability in the unborn child; the law was codified in a military ordinance in 1974.

The Faroe Islands, as a self-governing region within the Kingdom of Denmark, permits abortion on the limited grounds of risk to life, risk of harm to the pregnant woman's health, a high risk of a birth defect in the unborn child, or in cases where the pregnancy was caused by sexual crime. However, in December 2025, the Faroese parliament, the Løgting, passed new legislation granting free access to abortion for any reason up to 12 weeks. The new act took effect on 1 July, 2026.

Gibraltar, as a British Overseas Territory, is self-governing in terms of abortion law and allows for the grounds of risk of injury to physical or mental health of the pregnant woman (up to 12 weeks of gestation), and risk to life, grave permanent injury, or a substantial risk of fatal foetal abnormality (life-limiting condition) in the unborn child at any stage.

The Crown Dependencies of Guernsey, Jersey and the Isle of Man have similar laws to neighbouring England and Wales.

In Guernsey, abortion is permitted at any stage for an immediate risk to life, to prevent grave permanent injury, and on disability grounds. Up to 24 weeks, abortion is permitted on broad health grounds, where there would be a risk of injury to the physical or mental health of the pregnant woman or her existing children. Guernsey legislation on the issue is also applicable in Alderney.

The law in Jersey is more liberal in early pregnancy, permitted abortion on request up to 12 weeks, but more limited thereafter. Disability-related grounds are limited to serious disabilities diagnosed before viability (at 24 weeks) and a risk to life or grave permanent injury are grounds throughout pregnancy.

The Isle of Man has a highly structured law which allows for 14-week term limit for abortion on request. From 14 weeks to 24 weeks, abortion is legal where the pregnancy was caused by sexual crime or involves serious social grounds for a termination, or substantial risks of serious injury to the woman's life or health, or that the unborn child would be disabled. From 24 week, grounds are limited to risk to life, grave long-term injury, and serious disabilities in the unborn child.

Abortion law in Northern Ireland was previously devolved to the Northern Ireland Assembly but was liberalised by the UK Parliament in 2019 when the Assembly was suspended. The law currently allows for a 12-week term limit, in line with the rest of Ireland, and grounds for risk of injury to physical or mental health (up to 24 weeks), and risk to life, grave permanent injury, and disabilities at any stage.

In Scotland, abortion law was devolved to the Scottish Parliament through the Scotland Act 2016 but no changes have followed and the law therefore continues to align with England and Wales.

=== Contested jurisdictions ===
Several states with limited recognition or territories incorporated into another country by force exist in Europe, following recent armed conflicts which resulted in their formation. For example, Abkhazia and South Ossetia are internationally recognised as part of Georgia whereas Transnistria has de facto been separated from Moldova. The Ukrainian territories of Crimea, Luhansk, Donetsk, and Zaporizhzhia are mainly occupied by the Russian Federation.

Social policy in these territories may reflect laws introduced under a previous jurisdiction, an occupying administration, or by a protecting power which guarantees the security of the territory. Laws in Kosovo derive from Yugoslav law with a 10-week term limit for abortion on request. Northern Cyprus has adopted the same term limit policy, although this follows the approach taken in Turkey which solely recognises the territory as a jurisdiction.

== See also ==
- Abortion debate
- Abortion law
- Abortion-rights movements
- Anti-abortion movements
- Healthcare in Europe
- Law in Europe
- Religion in Europe
