= Urpo Rinne =

Finnish neurologist and fraudster

Urpo Rinne (born 1935) is a Finnish former professor of neurology of University of Turku and the former director of Turku University Hospital clinic of neurology. He was sentenced to prison in 2001 for embezzlement of research funds. An investigation by the Finnish National Authority for Medicolegal Affairs found that he had engaged in unethical medical practice, and as a result his right to practice medicine was limited. Criminal charges for patient mistreatment relating to his actions were never filed due to statute of limitations.

== Early life and career ==
Rinne was born in Parkano in 1935 and completed his matriculation examination in 1954. He graduated as a licenciate of medicine in 1960, and as a doctor of medicine later that same year. He was appointed as a temporary professor of medicine by the University of Turku on 1 September 1967, and as a permanent professor of neurology in 1969. By 1973, he had been appointed as director of the Turku University Hospital's clinic of neurology.

He retired from his position as a University of Turku professor of neurology before investigations into his misconduct began.

== Embezzlement and fraud ==
Rinne was convicted in 2001 for embezzlement of research funds, tax fraud and aggravated abuse of office. He received a sentence of 4 years' imprisonment. He had fraudulently charged the University of Turku some 42.5 million Finnish Marks. Rinne's two sons, both doctors, were fined in 2002 for tax fraud relating to gifts received from Rinne. Rinne had paid his sons' child care bills from the embezzled funds, and loaned one of the sons money to purchase a house.

Rinne's fraud came into light following investigations into three other Finnish medical researchers, Paavo Riekkinen, his son Paavo Riekkinen Junior, and Kari Syrjänen.

== Unethical medical practices ==
In a later investigation, the Finnish National Authority for Medicolegal Affairs found that Rinne had engaged in unethical medical practices and limited his rights to practice medicine. Rinne is only allowed to practice medicine in public healthcare and under the supervision and direction of another doctor. Criminal charges relating to the patients' treatment were not pursued due to statute of limitations.

According to the National Authority for Medicolegal Affairs, Rinne had kept several of his patients with Parkinson's disease untreated while waiting for research projects into which he could enroll the patients, stopped their treatment after relevant studies had ended, continued medical treatments despite patients either showing side effects or worsening health, and otherwise mislead patients about the nature of their treatment. By 2003, 14 of the approximately 700 patients examined by Rinne between 1979 and 2000 had received damages from the Finnish Patient Insurance Centre for their pain and suffering. The National Authority for Medicolegal Affairs determined that it was possible that some patients' ability to work and their quality of life could have remained higher longer with other treatment methods, but the nature of Parkinson's disease made it impossible to establish concrete malpractice.
