= Disability in Tuvalu =

Tuvalu has been slow to deal with problems that people with a disability face in the country. Since 1978, the government of Tuvalu has been slow to create policy and laws for people with disabilities. In addition, few studies have been done to assess the scope of the issue on the islands. The first comprehensive study of people with disabilities in Tuvalu was done in February 2017.

== Demographics ==
In 2012, there were 206 people with disabilities in Tuvalu, with the rate of prevalence of disability at 1.9% of the population. Most people with disabilities had a physical disability of some kind with 27.7% having a mental disability. A comprehensive study of people with disabilities in Tuvalu was done in 2017, and they collected 466 in the database for the Fusi Alofa Association (FAA) Tuvalu which is an organisation for people with disabilities.

== Policy ==
=== Legislation ===
Tuvalu implemented a mental health policy for the country in 1978. Current law does not prohibit discriminating against people with disabilities in all areas of their lives. There is no law or provisions for accommodating people with disabilities in public spaces. There are no government benefits for people with disabilities in Tuvalu. Tuvalu has tasked its Community Affairs Department in the Ministry of Home Affairs and Rural Development to protect the rights of people with disabilities in the country.

Tuvalu has signed and ratified the Convention on the Rights of Persons with Disabilities (CRPD).

=== Non-Governmental organisations ===
Before 2010, the Tuvalu Red Cross Society handled issues relating to people with disabilities, in addition to the other services they provided. The Red Cross used a medical model of disability. The organisation provided workshops and gave out wheelchairs and crutches to those who need them. During the 1980s and 1990s, the Red Cross operated a "small educational centre" on Funafuti, which employed two staff to help children with disabilities.

The Fusi Alofa Association (FAA) Tuvalu was created in 2010 and is the only cross-disability organisation working in Tuvalu. FAA Tuvalu was established to promote the rights of persons with disabilities and to give children with disabilities greater opportunities in Tuvalu. Prior to the formation of FAA Tuvalu, there were no services for disabled children in the country. FAA Tuvalu currently operates a school for children with disabilities on Funafuti.

== Unique challenges ==
Even though the island nation is small, transportation for people with physical disabilities can be an issue. In addition, even government buildings may not be accessible to individuals with physical disabilities.

Climate change also is problem that affects all Pacific Island nations and the elderly and people with disabilities are at a greater risk of being affected.
