= Abortion in Ukraine =

Live births + abortions in Ukraine

Abortion in Ukraine is legal on request during the first twelve weeks of pregnancy. Between 12 and 28 weeks, abortion is available on a variety of grounds, including medical, social and personal grounds, and for any reason with the approval of a commission of physicians. Oral contraception is available over-the-counter without a prescription and the morning after pill is also readily available.

Prior to 1991, abortion in Ukraine was governed by the abortion laws of the Soviet Union. The laws have not changed since then. Abortion rates have fallen from 109 abortions per 1000 women aged 15–44 in 1986 to 80.9 in 1991, 67.2 in 1996 and 27.5 in 2004. As of 2010, the abortion rate was 21.2 abortions per 1000 women aged 15–44. In 2014 the abortion rate in Ukraine decreased to 14.89 per 1000 women aged 15–44. Abortion rates in Ukraine and Belarus have converged in recent years, creating a large gap with post-Soviet Russia. (Note: Belarus, Russia and Ukraine were part of the Soviet Union from 1922 until its declaration of independence from the Soviet Union on 24 August 1991.) In 2018, the abortion rate increased to 247 abortions per 1000 live births.

Near the end of a long interview in 2019 during his political campaign, Volodymyr Zelenskyy (now President of Ukraine) was asked about abortion rights. The interviewer mentioned to Zelenskyy that laws are often adopted in Eastern and Central Europe that cause public outcry, saying that in Poland, for example, there were huge protests when the Polish government wanted to ban abortion. Zelenskyy stated that abortion should not be banned, that to get an abortion is a personal choice and that there needs to be less impingement on human freedom.

== Impact of the 2022 Russian Invasion ==
Reports revealed that access to abortion following the Russian invasion of Ukraine in 2022 became increasingly difficult. The Inter-Agency Working Group on Reproductive Health Crises identified access to safe abortion and post-abortion care as priority services for humanitarian aid, yet according to some experts, abortion services did not get the attention they deserved. The International Planned Parenthood Federation sent post-rape kits to Ukraine which included abortion pills after hearing reports of increased occurrences of rape.

Difficulties also arose due to Ukraine's geographical location. Many Ukrainians fled to neighbouring Poland but Polish abortion laws differ greatly from Ukraine's. Abortion is only allowed if a pregnancy is as a result of a criminal act or if a woman's life and health is in danger. Ukrainian women crossing the border into Poland were met by anti-abortion groups such as the Life and Family Group. Due to restrictive abortion laws in Poland and other neighbouring countries such as Hungary and Slovakia, many refugees have been forced to return to Ukraine to seek sexual and reproductive healthcare, or delay access to care, at significant risk to their health. Other have used illegal means to obtain abortion or healthcare in these countries, which is often only possible with the help of NGOs or other aide organisations.
