= Abortion in Finland =

Abortion is legal and free of charge upon request in Finland in the first 12 weeks of pregnancy since 1 September 2023. Between 1960 and 2023, abortion was widely accessible in practice for a variety of reasons (including socioeconomic factors), but nevertheless, the law required the pregnant woman to state her motivations and get approval from one or two doctors.

By international standards, political controversy in Finland regarding abortion has been mild, and incidence is low. Abortions in Finland have been decreasing since the 1960s. In 2021, around 7,600 abortions were performed.

== Legal framework ==
On 26 October 2022, the Finnish Parliament voted by 125–41 to reform the 1970 abortion law. The reform was initiated by a citizens' initiative which collected the required 50,000 signatures in 2020 for the issue to be dealt with by lawmakers. The law was modified so that abortion is available upon request, with no restrictions up until the end of the 12th week of pregnancy. After the gestational limit of the first 12 weeks, the bill allows pregnancy to be terminated at the pregnant woman's request if continuing the pregnancy or giving birth would endanger her health or life, for example because of illness or disability. The President of the Republic signed the bill into law on 20 December 2022. The law was officially published on 28 December 2022, and went into effect from 1 September 2023.

Prior to this, abortion laws in Finland were among the strictest in the European Union. Approval for an abortion required signatures by one or two physicians, depending on the specifics of the patient's case, and in some cases, additional permission from the National Supervisory Authority for Welfare and Health (Valvira). Additionally, if a woman was impregnated as a result of rape, it could not be used as the reason for abortion if charges had not been prosecuted against the alleged rapist. Therefore, officially, abortion was not legal upon request, though in reality, any pregnant woman got an abortion if it was requested before the 12th week of pregnancy, as the grounds for abortion were numerous.

== History ==
Percentage of conceptions aborted in Finland

In Finland, abortion was illegal until 1950, when the Parliament of Finland legalized abortions to preserve the physical or mental health of the woman, if the woman was under 16, if the fetus might be deformed, or if the woman had been raped. Under pressure from the women's liberation movement and supportive editorials from most national newspapers, Finnish law was further liberalized in 1970. The 1970 law allowed abortion up to 16 weeks of pregnancy for broad socio-economic reasons, if the woman was younger than 17, if the woman was older than 40, if the woman had already had four children, or if at least one parent would be unable to raise the child owing to disease or mental disturbance.

The time limit was lowered from 16 to 12 weeks in 1979. The 1970 law also allowed abortion up to 20 weeks of pregnancy in the event of fetal deformity or a physical threat to the woman's health. A 1985 bill allowed abortion up to 20 weeks of pregnancy for under-aged girls, and up to the 24th week if an amniocentesis or ultrasound found serious impairment in the fetus.

In 2008, there were 10,423 abortions in Finland. There has been a gradual decrease in abortions over time, largely attributable to a decrease in the under-20 age group As of 2010, the abortion rate was 10.4 abortions per 1000 women aged 15-44 years.

Abortions are provided free of charge in public hospitals. It is illegal to perform abortions in private clinics, though doctors are empowered to provide abortions outside of hospitals in emergency circumstances. Illegal abortions remain very rare because, due to the generality of the conditions specified in the law, in practice, a woman can get an abortion under almost any circumstance.

Political controversy since the 1970 law has been mild. Members of parliament from rightist parties, notably the Finns Party, periodically make statements decrying abortion as "immoral". Still, there has been no focused political campaign to significantly restrict abortion since legalization.

In 2020, a citizens' initiative led by the Feminist Association, with the aim of updating the law and allowing elective abortion in the first 12 weeks of pregnancy, gathered over 50,000 signatures, the necessary threshold to compel the Parliament to consider the proposal. Parliament approved the proposal in 2022.

== See also ==
- Abortion debate
- Abortion law
- Religion and abortion
- Category:Abortion by country
