= Abortion in Northern Cyprus =

Abortion in Northern Cyprus is regulated by law.

== Legal framework ==
Abortion is freely accessible on the request of the pregnant woman until the 10th week of pregnancy. After the 10th week, a qualified doctor can still conduct an abortion, but this is subject to some conditions. If the woman is married, a joint written request must be given to the doctor; if she is not and is a major, her own written request is sufficient. If she is a minor, her legal guardian must submit a request. If there is a medical, life-threatening condition that necessitates abortion, the written request is not required, provided that two specialists in the field of the complications causing this necessity provide scientific and objective reports stating why the abortion is needed. In the case of a "difficult situation", the doctor is legally permitted to sacrifice the life of the fetus in order to save the mother. The conditions are delineated by the 28th article of the 1983 Law on the Turkish Cypriot Medical Association, and no limit is set for abortion under the aforementioned circumstances.

The penal code, however, states that it is not considered a crime to end pregnancy in the first ten weeks of pregnancy provided that the woman and her husband give consent if the woman is married. This clause has drawn criticism from women's rights advocates as a violation of the right of the woman to control her own body. For adult, unmarried women, their own consent is deemed sufficient.

== Ethics and events ==
According to The Continuum Complete International Encyclopedia of Sexuality, no doctors in Northern Cyprus refuse to conduct abortions on ethical reasons and private clinics carry it out on a national scale. In 2014, however, Filiz Besim wrote that a doctor had refused to abort a fetus, conceived by a 14-year-old due to rape, as it was on the 20th week of pregnancy and the fetus was fully formed. In 2012, Prime Minister İrsen Küçük stated that state hospitals carried out abortions "in health-related or necessary cases". During the same year, the relatively liberal attitudes in Northern Cyprus prompted "abortion tours" from Turkey, where women were intimidated by the government's anti-abortion rhetoric and practices. Suphi Hüdaoğlu, the head of the Cyprus Turkish Medical Association, predicted that if abortion was banned in Turkey, Northern Cyprus would suffer from a "flood of abortions", as was the case when an influx of casinos occurred when casinos were banned in Turkey, and said that they did not want such an influx to occur.
