= Abortion in Iceland =

Abortion in Iceland is legal on request until the end of the 22nd week of pregnancy. The abortion rate in Iceland is relatively high, in comparison to other Nordic countries.

== Legislation ==
Abortion in Iceland was legalized on a number of grounds on 22 May 1975. Although the 1975 law did not allow abortions to be performed on request, they were allowed in various medical and social circumstances. Medically, an abortion was lawful if a pregnancy threatened a woman's physical or mental health, if the fetus had a serious congenital defect, or if the woman was deemed incapable of caring for a child because of her age or mental disability. Social grounds for allowing abortion included: if the pregnancy was the result of rape or incest; if the woman had had several children already with only brief periods between pregnancies; if the woman lived in a particularly difficult family situation; or if the woman's or her partner's ill health prevented them from being able to care for a child.

All Icelandic women who undergo abortions are required to receive counselling both prior to and following the procedure, including education about contraceptive use.

The performance of an unlawful abortion carries a sentence of between five and seven years' imprisonment.

In April 2017, the Government proposed making changes to abortion legislation in Iceland so that abortion would no longer be described as "foetus elimination" (fóstureyðing), but would instead be described as "pregnancy interruption" (þungunarrof).

In May 2019, the Icelandic parliament legalized abortion on demand until week 22 of the pregnancy. Previously, abortion was only legal if performed within the first 16 weeks of pregnancy, unless a pregnancy threatened the woman's health or the fetus had a deformity.

== Statistics ==
A study published in 2003 found that over the period of 1976–1999, the abortion rate in Iceland rose by 133%, increasing from 9.4 abortions per 1000 women to 21.9 per 1000 women, with the highest regional rates in the Reykjavík area. The authors noted that Iceland's abortion rate was higher than in any of the other Nordic countries, a trend which they attributed to the limited sex education, early initiation of sexual activity, and less effective use of contraception in Iceland.

As of 2010, the abortion rate in Iceland was 14.5 abortions per 1000 women aged 15–44 years.

Landspítali offers pre-natal screening for chromosomal anomalies. There are reports that the high rate of pregnancy termination in response to positive results has led to the near-eradication of people with Down syndrome in Iceland. But this is also explained as misinterpretation of statistics on a very small number of births, and explained that a more accurate difference is only about 10% less Down Syndrome births, compared to other European countries.
