= Abortion in Kazakhstan =

Abortion in Kazakhstan is legal as an elective procedure up to 12 weeks, and special circumstances afterwards. The relevant legislation is based on the laws inherited from the country's Soviet past, when abortion was legally permitted as a contraceptive.

== Laws ==
The laws regulating abortion in Kazakhstan are the Reproductive Rights Law (2004), the Criminal Code (1997) and the Ministry of Health Medical and Social Indications for Abortion (2008). (Note: Other sources refer to Order 626 of the Ministry of Health (October 2009), “On approving realisation rules in relation to artificial termination of pregnancy”, and RK “Populations Health and Healthcare System” Code, Article 104.)

Abortion is legal in the following cases:

- If the pregnant woman's health is at risk in one of the following ways, the approval of a committee of three health professionals (a gynecologist, the head of the institution, and an expert on her condition) is required, (Note: Page 3 of the Indications of the Ministry of Health.) and that the illness be on an approved list.
  - If the woman's life is at risk, (Note: Page 5 of the Indications of the Ministry of Health.) with no limit as to gestational age.
  - If the woman's health could be significantly harmed, with no limit as to gestational age.
  - If the woman's mental health is at risk.
- Upon request, for whatever reason, including reasons such as pregnancy from an incestuous relationship.
- If the pregnant woman has a cognitive or intellectual disability. (Note: Page 6 of the Indications of the Ministry of Health.)
- Pregnancy in a minor, requiring parental permission or that of another adult. (Note: Page 9 of the Reproductive Rights Law; page 2 of the Indications of the Ministry of Health.)

Legal abortions are provided in private centers, Women's Consulting Centers, Maternity Houses, Polyclinics with Women's Consulting Offices, many hospitals and Family Group Practices. Second-trimester abortions can only be performed in perinatal centers, maternity houses and multi-regional hospitals.

The state provides measures to ensure that abortions are safe, and obliges a pregnant woman considering an abortion to be assessed. (Note: Page 9 of the Reproductive Rights Law.) Providers of illegal abortions are sanctioned. (Note: Article 117 of the Penal Code.) Contraceptives are provided following an abortion.

== History ==
Information on the prevalence of abortion in Kazakhstan comes primarily from two sources: the Ministry of Health and the Demographic and Health Survey of Kazakhstan. High-quality surveys and other data are available, since the procedure has been legal for some time. However, reports are occasionally contradictory. (Note: Some reports refer to abortions being available in a variety of locations, while the Kazakh Association on Sexual and Reproductive Health mentions only Almaty and the private sector.)

=== Soviet Kazakhstan ===
For most of the 20th century, due to state support, the main method of contraception used in the Soviet Union was abortion.

In 1920, the Soviet Union legalized abortion upon request as a temporary measure, because in the state of economic crisis, legal abortions would be a necessary measure to ensure sanitary conditions. In Kazakhstan, the native Kazakhs were opposed. Over the following decade, anti-abortion would be an important current among Kazakhs, framed as a cultural bastion attacked by Soviet (generally Slavic) officials. Even during the period of legalization, Russian authorities applauded Kazakh resistance to abortion. Physicians warned that there were health risks associated with frequent resort to abortion. During the period when abortion was legal, it was not practiced as legislators had intended – clinics did not receive funding and patients were forced to pay. Abortions were mainly had by ethnic Russian women in the Kazakhstan region (a mere 0.002% of abortions were performed on ethnic Kazakh women, primarily in urban areas).

For Kazakhs, abortion was taboo, although there were traditional methods practiced involving herbal abortifacients. The number of abortions performed increased in Kazakhstan as it did in Russia, with a particular increase between 1927 and 1928 provoked by the increase in available information about the surgical procedure and the change in morality. Illegal abortions began to decline and the increased abortion rate began to worry officials, such that officials began to distrust the practice of legal abortion, which led to it being banned.

Illegal abortions occurred when doctors refused to perform abortions for one of the following health reasons: pregnancies past the first trimester, first pregnancies, or for those with dangerous medical conditions. The fact that legally available abortions did not totally eliminate illegal abortions contributed to the Soviet decision to criminalize. At the start of the 1930s, Soviet officials openly criticized abortion and its legalization. In peripheral areas of the USSR, including Kazakhstan, there was concern over the effects of sudden prohibition among those who defended a gradual prohibition and even education about other contraceptive methods.

The period of legality ended on June 27, 1936, with "The Decree in Defense of Mother and Child", a law under which abortions could only be performed for patients whose lives were in danger. Illegal abortions did not guarantee safe, sanitary conditions. The regional (oblast) government established a system of controls to ensure the law was obeyed: physicians had to declare their practices, sending a request to end a pregnancy to be reviewed by a monthly committee.

Illegalization reinforced women's traditional roles in a patriarchal social situation, as it reinforced the idea of women as mothers and thus good patriots according to Soviet expectations. The press was used as a propaganda tool against women who underwent illegal abortions, depicting them as capricious enemies of the motherland. As Kazakh women rarely chose to have abortions, they were not targeted by legal persecution. Women who went to hospitals with symptoms suggesting abortion were investigated. Doctors who practiced illegal abortions could be imprisoned for up to three years. (Note: Section 140 of the Penal Code.) There are no reliable sources as to this clandestine activity but evidence from the archives, contrary to the cased treated in the press, shows that women found undergoing illegal abortions were generally unmarried.

In one case in 1940, eleven women with symptoms typical of attempted abortion were detained and separated from their families, underwent state scrutiny and faced public humiliation. They were later cleared of all charges.

Due to a lack of presence on the ground, anti-abortion propaganda struggled to reach the people. The campaign's impact is difficult to measure as there is little evidence of effect to be found.

In the post-war period, it became evident that the propaganda effort had failed to reduce abortions. Following the death of Joseph Stalin in 1953, the state stopped chasing illegal abortions and physicians practiced abortions in the first trimester upon request. In 1968, the Soviet Union once again legalized abortion upon request.

=== Independent Kazakhstan ===
Year	Legal abortion rate (out of 1000 women aged 15–44)
1995	53
1999	43.9, or between 57 and 55 according to official sources
2004	35
2008	32.3
2010	27.4
2012	24.5

Beginning with its independence from the USSR in 1991, Kazakhstan began to replace abortion with other methods of contraception. The relevant legislation in Kazakhstan has been influenced by the country's Soviet past. Despite the decline in abortions in favor of other contraceptive methods, abortion remained the most widely used contraceptive method in the 1990s. Since the country's independence, abortions are increasingly performed in the private sector, leading the official rate of abortions to decline.

A study based on the data between 1995 and 1999 found that abortions are mostly performed in urban areas, the then capital Almaty and the North and East regions of the country. Most women having abortions were ethnic Russians. Areas with a higher rate of education saw a greater fall in the use of abortion. Married women make up almost the entirety of women who have abortions since premarital sex is much less common in predominantly Muslim countries. The reason for having an abortion is primarily to limit births as well as to increase the time between births. First pregnancies are rarely aborted in the country.

The probability that a pregnancy would be aborted was 36.8%. The percentage of pregnancies resulting from contraceptive failure leading to abortion was 67%. The Demographic and Health Survey of Kazakhstan asked 3,771 women if they would have an abortion in case of accidental pregnancy and 35.6% responded in the affirmative, 20.6% were not sure and the rest replied in the negative.

In February 1994, a family planning program was approved which established a family planning service in medical institutions to try to reduce abortions and maternal mortality.

Between 1993 and 1997, the United Nations funded reproductive health in the country, with one of its primary aims being reducing the abortion rate.

Between 1995 and 1999 abortions were officially free, but in practice, people were obliged to pay, with prices between 8 and US$20. These payments were generally not made in rural areas. In 1995, a wide-reaching campaign warned of the health risk of illegal abortions.

The laws remained essentially the same between 1996 and 2013.

In 1999, the vacuum aspiration technique was used in nearly half of all abortions in Kazakhstan.

In 2000, a country-wide government program was approved to reduce abortions. The program trained medical professionals and informed the population about other contraceptive methods.

A UN report published in 2002 explained that abortions were available on request during the first trimester, with no particular motivation required; between 12 and 28 weeks, the service is available if certain social or medical circumstances are present.

In 2001, a Health Ministry order was approved on the medical reasons and regulations of abortion. In 2009, the ministry approved Order 626, which was modified in 2012 regarding the following aspects:

Conditions for abortion in 2009	Conditions for abortion in 2012
Up to 12 weeks: Upon request; Between 12 and 22 weeks, on social grounds, including: Death of the husband during pregnancy; Incarceration of the woman or her husband; Unemployment of the woman or her husband; If the woman is unmarried; Deprivation or limitation of parental rights; When the pregnancy is a result of rape; If the woman has refugee or forced migrant status; If there is a disabled child in the family; Divorce during the pregnancy; If there are 4 or more children in the family; In case of fetal malformation; With no gestational limit: If there are medical indications threatening the life of the pregnant woman, with her consent; For minors under 16, parental consent is required. The state subsidizes abortions performed for social or medical reasons.	Up to 12 weeks: Upon request; Between 12 and 22 weeks, on social grounds, including: Death of the husband during pregnancy; Incarceration of the woman or her husband; Unemployment of the woman or her husband; If the woman is unmarried; Deprivation or limitation of parental rights; When the pregnancy is a result of rape; If the woman has refugee or forced migrant status; If there is a disabled child in the family; Divorce during the pregnancy; If there are 4 or more children in the family; The patient is under 18 years of age; With no gestational limit: If there are medical indications threatening the life of the pregnant woman, with her consent; In case of fetal malformation; For minors under 18, parental consent is required. The state subsidizes abortions performed for social or medical reasons.

Legal abortions are practiced in private centers, Women's Consulting Centers, Maternity Houses, Polyclinics with Women's Consulting Offices, many hospitals and Family Group Practices. The successful reduction of the abortion rate was due to the efforts in education, information and communication (like the Red Apple campaign on social media) which encouraged the population to use modern contraceptive methods. However, the abortion rate among Russians went down 33% while among Kazakhs, the decrease was much smaller.

The medications used to induce abortion are Mifepristone and Misoprostol.

There is a high rate of abortion among teenagers.

The Kazakh Association on Sexual and Reproductive Health stated in 2009 and 2012 that medical abortions were only practiced in Almaty in private centers and that the establishment of services in state medical centers was being considered the latter year. It also declared that in 2007, there were 11,666 abortions in the city of Almaty, of which 74.3% were performed using dilation and curettage. The average price among private practitioners was 5000 KZT ($41) in 2009 and $200 in 2012.

A 2007 investigation concluded that the high abortion rate could be caused by limited access to health services, especially in rural regions. Intrauterine devices are commonly used as a contraceptive in Kazakhstan without professional help, as there are few available methods. This may be why the primary contraceptive method used in the country is abortion.

A 2010 report found that the state provided no information on sexual and reproductive health, including abortion.

A 2011 report found that the rates of teenage pregnancy and back-alley abortions were leading to deaths, primarily caused by a lack of specific preventative programs.

== Statistics ==
=== Historical abortion statistics ===
Definition of table data:

- Live births.
- Abortions, reported includes legal reported induced abortions.
- Abortions (AWR) are combined reported and estimated abortion occurrences from the Abortion Worldwide Report and working papers.
- Abortions, residents, in country only includes reported abortions obtained within the country by residents only.
- Abortions, residents, obtained abroad includes reported abortions by country residents obtained in other countries.
- Abortions, residents, total includes reported abortions by residents, obtained both within the country and abroad.
- Fetal deaths generally includes fetal deaths or stillbirths of at least 20 weeks` gestation.
- Miscarriages generally includes spontaneous fetal losses/ abortions, fetal deaths, or stillbirths, regardless of gestation period.
- Abortion ratio is abortions per 1000 live births.
- Abortion % is abortions as percentage of pregnancies (excluding fetal deaths/miscarriages).
- Abortion rate, residents is abortions by residency per 1000 women ages 15–49.
- Abortion rate, occurrences (AWR) is abortion occurrences from Abortion Worldwide Report figures per 1000 women ages 15–39.

year*	live births	abortions, reported	abortions (AWR)	abortions, residents, in country only	abortions, residents, obtained abroad	abortions, residents, total	abortions, illegal	miscarriages	fetal deaths	abortion ratio		abortion %		abortion rate, residents	abortion rate, occurrences (AWR)
year*	live births	abortions, reported	abortions (AWR)	abortions, residents, in country only	abortions, residents, obtained abroad	abortions, residents, total	abortions, illegal	miscarriages	fetal deaths	residents, in/out of country	all in country	residents, in/out of country	all in country	abortion rate, residents	abortion rate, occurrences (AWR)
1925		582	582	(582)		582									
1926															
1927		2,360	2,360	(2,360)		2,360									
1928		6,127	6,127	(6,127)		6,127									
1929		1,950	1,950	(1,950)		1,950									
1930		2,660	2,660	(2,660)		2,660									
1931		2,190	2,190	(2,190)		2,190									
1932		840	840	(840)		840									
1933															
1934															
1935															
1936															
1937															
1938															
1939															
1940	(254,000)														
1941															
1942		11,214	11,214	(11,214)		11,214	1,675								
1943		1,600	1,600	(1,600)		1,600									
1944		7,811	7,811	(7,811)		7,811	1,278								
1945		10,303	10,303	(10,303)		10,303	1,684								
1946		15,901	15,901	(15,901)		15,901	3,866								
1947		16,263	16,263	(16,263)		16,263	3,096								
1948		4,079	4,079	(4,079)		4,079	4,079								
1949															
1950	(251,900)														
1951	(270,000)														
1952	(262,600)														
1953	(260,300)														
1954	(275,700)														
1955	(299,300)		(25,000)												
1956	(304,800)		(58,000)												
1957	(326,100)		(101,000)												
1958	(355,300)		(164,000)												
1959	(349,100)		(228,000)												
1960	371,828		(335,000)												
1961	377,002		(363,000)												
1962	368,298		(379,000)												
1963	352,400		(388,000)												
1964	330,511		(389,000)												
1965	320,585		(404,000)												
1966	313,465		(392,000)												
1967	307,197		(381,000)												
1968	302,022		(372,000)												
1969	302,179		(370,000)												
1970	306,652		(372,000)												
1971	317,423	382,702	382,702	(382,702)		382,702				1,205.7	1,205.7	54.66	54.66		
1972	318,551	383,764	383,764	(383,764)		383,764				1,204.7	1,204.7	54.64	54.64		
1973	321,075	387,626	387,626	(387,626)		387,626				1,207.3	1,207.3	54.70	54.70		
1974	338,291	377,070	377,070	(377,070)		377,070				1,114.6	1,114.6	52.71	52.71		
1975	343,668	390,809	390,809	(390,809)		390,809				1,137.2	1,137.2	53.21	53.21	124.0	
1976	350,362	395,712	395,712	(395,712)		395,712				1,129.4	1,129.4	53.04	53.04		
1977	349,379	406,247	406,247	(406,247)		406,247				1,162.8	1,162.8	53.76	53.76		
1978	355,337	392,734	392,734	(392,734)		392,734				1,105.2	1,105.2	52.50	52.50		
1979	354,320	380,692	380,692	(380,692)		380,692				1,074.4	1,074.4	51.79	51.79		
1980	356,013	378,125	378,125	(378,125)		378,125				1,062.1	1,062.1	51.51	51.51	108.3	
1981	367,950	359,824	359,824	(359,824)		359,824				977.9	977.9	49.44	49.44		
1982	373,416	364,087	364,087	(364,087)		364,087				975.0	975.0	49.37	49.37	103.3	
1983	378,577	362,371	362,371	(362,371)		362,371				957.2	957.2	48.91	48.91		
1984	389,091	349,366	349,366	(349,366)		349,366				897.9	897.9	47.31	47.31	98.1	
1985	396,929	367,334	367,334	(367,334)		367,334				925.4	925.4	48.06	48.06		
1986	410,846	332,055	332,055	(332,055)		332,055				808.2	808.2	44.70	44.70	91.5	
1987	417,139	329,819	329,819	(329,819)		329,819				790.7	790.7	44.15	44.15		
1988	407,116	362,596	362,596	(362,596)		362,596				890.6	890.6	47.11	47.11	97.1	
1989	380,849	358,124	358,124	(358,124)		358,124			3,916	940.3	940.3	48.46	48.46	72.4	101.58
1990	362,081	355,173	355,173	(355,173)		355,173			3,692	980.9	980.9	49.52	49.52	92.4	100.03
1991	353,174	358,484	358,484	(358,484)		358,484			3,474	1,015.0	1,015.0	50.37	50.37	87.7	100.40
1992	337,612	346,405	346,405	(346,405)		346,405			3,184	1,026.0	1,026.0	50.64	50.64	84.1	96.76
1993	315,482	290,703	290,703	(290,703)		290,703			2,710	921.5	921.5	47.96	47.96	70.1	81.93
1994	305,624	261,834	261,834	(261,834)		261,834			2,705	856.7	856.7	46.14	46.14	63.1	75.39
1995	276,125	224,100	224,100	(224,100)		224,100			2,455	811.6	811.6	44.80	44.80	54.3	66.14
1996	253,175	194,187	194,187	(194,187)		194,187			2,365	767.0	767.0	43.41	43.41	47.2	58.11
1997	232,356	156,751	156,751	(156,751)		156,751			2,206	674.6	674.6	40.28	40.28	38.3	47.61
1998	222,380	149,248	149,248	(149,248)		149,248			2,055	671.1	671.1	40.16	40.16	36.7	46.01
1999	211,815	138,197	138,197	(138,197)		138,197			1,899	652.4	652.4	39.48	39.48	34.0	42.92
2000	217,379	134,111	134,111	(134,111)		134,111			1,812	616.9	616.9	38.15	38.15	32.8	41.58
2001	220,748	136,787	136,787	(136,787)		136,787			1,719	619.7	619.7	38.26	38.26	33.2	42.22
2002	227,169	124,523	124,523	(124,523)		124,523		1,788	1,748	548.2	548.2	35.41	35.41	30.0	38.10
2003	246,933	127,180	127,180	(127,180)		127,180		1,751	1,768	515.0	515.0	34.00	34.00	35.0	38.49
2004	270,737	129,495	129,495	(129,495)		129,495		1,873	1,729	478.3	478.3	32.35	32.35	30.4	38.66
2005	278,977	125,654	125,654	(125,654)		125,654		2,138	1,899	450.4	450.4	31.05	31.05	29.1	37.00
2006	278,977	130,599	130,599	(130,599)		130,599			2,066	468.1	468.1	31.89	31.89	30.1	37.85
2007	321,963	133,097	133,097	(133,097)		133,097			2,171	413.4	413.4	29.25	29.25	31.1	38.02
2008	339,269	123,992	123,992	(123,992)		123,992			4,021	365.5	365.5	26.77	26.77	28.1	34.99
2009	357,552	113,320	113,320	(113,320)		113,320			3,713	316.9	316.9	24.07	24.07	24.7	31.67
2010	367,752	106,074	106,074	(106,074)		106,074			3,488	288.4	288.4	22.39	22.39	23.0	29.37
2011	372,801	95,288	95,288	(95,288)		95,288			3,285	255.6	255.6	20.36	20.36	24.2	26.27
2012	381,005	95,654	95,654	(95,654)		95,654			3,453	251.1	251.1	20.07	20.07	24.2	26.43
2013	387,227	84,265	106,000	(84,265)		84,265			3,206	217.6	217.6	17.87	17.87	18.4	29.43
2014	399,951	83,709	83,709	(83,709)		83,709			3,371	209.3	209.3	17.31	17.31		23.35
2015	398,073	81,440	81,440	(81,440)		81,440			2,344	204.6	204.6	16.98	16.98		22.82
2016	400,694	78,857	78,857	78,857		78,857			2,382	196.8	196.8	16.44	16.44		
2017	390,262	80,328	80,328	80,328		80,328			2,321	205.8	205.8	17.07	17.07		
2018	397,799		(80,000)						2,257						
2019			(80,000)												

*last updated 14 January 2020

=== Abortions by region ===
Region	Year*									
Region	1999	2000	2001	2002	2003	2004	2005	2006	2007	2008
Almaty (city)	14,421	10,013	11,037			17,487			16,000	16,100
Astana (city)						8,113				9,600
CENTRAL/EAST KAZAKHSTAN		34,400				33,126				29,700
East Kazakhstan		18,039								16,600
Karagnandinskaya		16,400			16,700			10,300		13,100
NORTH KAZAKHSTAN						32,898				29,800
Akmolinskaya					11,700					10,200
Kostanayskaya										8,200
North Kazakhstan		7,608			7,660					6,300
Pavlodarskaya										5,100
SOUTH KAZAKHSTAN						20,294				20,900
Almatinskaya		13,249							5,000	4,800
Kyzylordinskaya		2,801								1,700
South Kazakhstan		7,758								9,200
Zhambylskaya										5,200
WEST KAZAKHSTAN						17,549				17,700
Aktyubinskaya										3,900
Atyrauskaya		1,957								1,700
Mangistauskaya										3,400
West Kazakhstan				7,000	15,700					8,700
KAZAKHSTAN TOTAL	138,197	134,111	136,787	124,523	127,180	129,495	125,654	130,599	133,097	124,000

*last updated 11 April 201

== Bibliography ==
- Kazakhstan Association on Sexual and Reproductive Health (2009). "Kazakhstan". Abortion legislation in Europe (PDF) (8th ed.). Brussels: IPPF European Network. pp. 45–46.
- Kazakhstan Association on Sexual and Reproductive Health (2012). "Kazakhstan". Abortion legislation in Europe (PDF) (9th ed.). Brussels: IPPF European Network. pp. 44–45. Archived from the original (PDF) on 2021-05-05.
- Michaels, Paula A. (2001). "Motherhood, Patriotism, and Ethnicity: Soviet Kazakhstan and the 1936 Abortion Ban". Feminist Studies. 27 (2): 307–333. doi:10.2307/3178760. hdl:2027/spo.0499697.0027.205. JSTOR 3178760. PMID 17985490.
- Olds, Suzanne; Westoff, Charles F. (2004). Abortion and Contraception in Georgia and Kazakhstan. New York.
- Westoff, Charles F. (2000). The substitution of contraception for abortion in Kazakhstan in the 1990s (PDF). Calverton, Maryland: ORC Macro.
- United Nations, Department of Economic and Social Affairs, Population Division (2002). Abortion Policies : A Global Review.
- United Nations, Department of Economic and Social Affairs, Population Division (2014). Abortion policies and reproductive health around the world. ISBN 978-92-1-056837-1.
