= Abortion in Armenia =

Abortion in Armenia is legal on request up to 12 weeks of pregnancy, and in special circumstances between 12 weeks and 22 weeks. Abortion was legalized in Soviet Armenia as part of USSR in October 1920, with a ban on unconditional abortions being enacted again from 1936 to 1955. Pregnancies may be ended on request by the pregnant woman until the twelfth week and for medical and social reasons until the twenty-second week with a doctor's approval. Since 2016, when a law banning sex-selective abortion was passed, mandatory counseling is required before abortion along with a three-day waiting period. The law has been criticized as using sex-selective abortion as a pretext to restrict access to abortion, although the government denied this, and claimed that it did not intend to question women's right to access safe abortion.

Abortion was used as a manner of birth control in Armenia and the number of maternal deaths from abortion complications used to be very high (between 10 and 20% in 2000). After massive reforms, the number of deaths declined to 5% in 2005.

In 2014, 21.77% of pregnancies in Armenia ended in abortion, a slight rise from the all-time low recorded in 2010 (21.52%). The United Nations reported an abortion rate (expressed as the number of abortions per 1000 women aged 15–44) of 13.9 in 2004 and 16.9 as of 2010.

== Historical Context ==
=== Women's Reproductive Rights and Abortion of Istanbul Armenians (1918-1913) ===
Surviving children became the main ideology of the Armenian community in the period following the Armenian Genocide, as examined by historian Ekmekçioğlu.

Hayganuş Mark's Hay Gin publication (founded in 1919) had a section called ‘Children’s beauty’ that encouraged local and diaspora Armenians to send photos of their children to be featured in the publication. Baldrian regards this as a pronatalist discourse that had a negative influence on women's reproductive rights. According to Ekmekçioğlu, in some cases women were blamed by community powerholders for infanticide after getting pregnant due to sexual violence and seeking abortions.

Armenian Red Cross co-founder Zaruhi Kalemkearian' diary has a record about a teenage girl who wanted to terminate a pregnancy in the first trimester but learned it was not viable.

"Hay Puzhak" (Armenian doctor) newspaper's July issue of 1922 headlined at "Where are you headed, Armenian woman?’ the author writes, ‘Why have you been corrupted? What compels you to commit infanticide? Your ancestors were proud of bearing many children. […] You should be courageous and stay away from any corrupt thoughts and commit yourself to procreation which is your only obligation.’’ The paper refers to abortion assigning reproduction as women's primary role in society.

=== Abortion in Soviet Armenia (1924-1936) ===
On 18 November 1920, the Soviet Union became the first state in the world to legalize abortion. According to Nakachi, a historian of the former Soviet Union, while abortions were not considered safe in the USSR, women's exploitation in the family, as believed by the time's authorities, motivated the move. Thus, as Sona Baldrian, an independent feminist and Marxist researcher, claims in her article "Abortion history in the Armenian context", it was done from a class standpoint, not a reproductive rights one, also considered to be a rather temporary measure. The Soviet authorities' stance was, Baldrian says, that after the completion of the socialist project women's need for abortions would fade away, as the material reality would dramatically change for women and the care for their children; until then, women were exploited in the family and "abortion rights would be one of the ways to liberate them from exploitation."

Baldrian has studied the Healthcare section of the Armenian woman worker (1924-1998) newspaper to analyze the historical context. In her article, she mentions the November 1925 issue, where the doctors describe an unsafe abortion incident possibly ending with death. The pieces concludes with: "Women should never take different measures to get rid of the child."

During this period, Armenian woman worker newspaper also included articles criticizing child marriages, domestic violence, and traditional medicine, as well as critiques to midwives, "calling them and their methods outdated and dangerous."

In an issue from April 1936, an article on "Abortion and its dangers" Dr. Asatourov, head of the gynecological department of the Physiotherapy Institute writes about the alleged dangers of abortion from a medical perspective, that, according to Baldrian, gives an insights into the medical community's view of the issue of the time. In the article, Asaturov, says referring to midwives increases the harms of abortions for women. He also mentions that underground abortions have high morality rates. Even with most experienced doctors, Dr. Asatourov says, damages may occur when inserting different instruments into the uterus. Dr. Asatourov: "Abortion is not a safe procedure, it is better to not have abortions.

The 1936 June issue, Baldrian says, begins with explanations behind the ban of abortion in USSR and the future state policies on family and children’s social security. The law had banned abortions from 1936 to 1955 with the only exception of the continuation of the pregnancy imposing a threat to the woman’s life or when the fetus had hereditary diseases. Doctors illegally performing abortions would face up to two years of prison; as for unlicensed people, the sentence would be at least three years. A sentence would be imposed against those who forced a woman to get an abortion for up to two years; women who got an abortion would be fined up to 300 rubles. This June 1936 issue also "suggested raising the social benefits for mothers with multiple children and introducing laws protecting pregnant women’s labor rights," as Baldrian states. It is also this issue of the newspaper that begins the pro-natalist discourse, absent before with only medical arguments, with some militarist intentions: "I am getting ready to protect my glorious homeland" says one of the newspaper photos. Baldrian says the enforcing of gender roles was due to the time's geopolitical context in the Soviet Union.

Until 1955 abortion was illegal in the Soviet Union meaning women were forced carry out unsafe conditions and often risk dying as a result. As Nakachi states, from 1949 to 1955, 4000 women died as a result of unsafe abortions. This certainly was a great concern to doctors and policy makers, as in 1955 there Maria Kovrigina, the first woman Health minister of the USSR, who unified efforts put forth by women doctors to legalize abortion again.

Kovirgina said, "Women should have a right to make their own decisions" and that women should not be turned into creatures, whose only purpose is to constantly give birth. To this day, the reproduction rights law in Armenia is based on the 1955 version.

=== Abortion in Soviet Armenia (1970-1990) ===
The arbitrary terminations of pregnancy were widespread in the USSR. Today, the number of abortions in Armenia is quite high, which, according to independent researcher Yelena Yeghiazaryan, is mainly a cultural legacy of the Soviet period.

The decision to legalize abortion again in 1955 was influenced by the changes in 1936 concerning the criminalization of abortion and the wider consequences of applying strict pro-natalist policies.

Maria Kovrigina, who became the first female minister in the USSR in March 1954, had a great impact on the re-legalization of abortion. When she became the Minister of Health, she fought for the legalization of abortion and demonstrated to the public that the ban did not eliminate the problems associated with it.

Since 1955 (the year the law on the prohibition of abortions was repealed), there has been an annual increase in the number of abortions for 10 years. Having increased from 2537.4 thousand in 1955 to 8350.7 thousand in 1965.

Overall, the re-legalization of abortion, fought by women like Maria Kovrigina, led to greater access to reproductive health in the Soviet Union and became a legacy for independent Armenia's law on abortion.

== Sex-selective abortion ==
Armenia, together with other countries, notably China and India, has a problem with sex-selective abortion. This has caused major political debates, both internationally and nationally. Nevertheless, Armenia's policies to deal with this issue have been controversial and subject to criticism.

In 2016, the country adopted regulations to curb this practice. Sex-selective abortion was explicitly outlawed in 2016. However, even before 2016, sex-selective abortion was implicitly banned, as ever since Armenia's legalization of abortion in 1955 under Soviet law, it has always restricted abortion after the first trimester, when sex-selective abortions happen. The only thing that has changed several times throughout the years is the reasons laid down by the government for an abortion after 12 weeks to be approved. Since sex selection was never an approved legal reason, such abortions were always technically illegal. As such, the 2016 law explicitly banning abortion for reasons of sex-selection was seen as redundant and unenforceable. It came with a major controversy: a three-day waiting period requirement. There has been concern that poor women from rural areas will not be able to afford to travel several times to cities to have safe abortions, thus increasing the rate of unsafe abortion in the country, especially given the high rate of abortion in general. A criticism of Armenia's policies that deal with sex selection is that they do not focus on the culture which sees women as inferior and which fuels sex selection due to the way girls are devalued.

Social Causes of the Sex-Selective Abortions

In the 2020 report, the Human Rights Office of Armenia, under the conduction of Arman Tatoyan, declared that Armenian society faced fundamental errors concerning sex-selective abortions. Due to him, sex-selective abortions are primarily discrimination towards the female gender and female societal role. There are two sides to such an inclination toward gender bias. According to The Guardian 2016 October issue article, "Law to cut sex-selective abortions in Armenia, ‘putting lives at risk,’" states that from the point of the elders, parallel to low pensions, the custom-based caretaker is considered to be the eldest son. Traditionally, the daughter’s family has the right to hinder her from caring for her family of orientation. So, if no boys are in the family, the chance of being left without care during their elder years rises drastically, which makes male generations more preferred. Similarly, the pressure from the elders’ side over the woman motivates women to strive to have male children to gain a well-respected position in a family, earn a guarantee for the future, and back down from the elders' as well as the husbands' discriminatory attitude.

According to the survey conducted by the United Nations Population Fund (UNFPA) in 2012 with 2830 households throughout Armenia, the number of women who prefer to have a son is 2.7 times larger than those who prefer a daughter. In contrast, every second respondent (43.1%) had no gender preferences for a child. For the second child, given the cases when the first is a boy, although the selection was still given to boys, the number of women preferring a girl grew almost two-fold (32.2%).

One of the issues still present in Armenian society is cases when the decision is made under the influence of the family members rather than autonomously by the women who bear the child. The UNFPA data displays that from the 368 surveyed women, the decision to terminate the current pregnancy is taken by men and women separately, 47.1% for each, and 5.9% of the cases by Mother-in-Law. For the question of whether there was pressure from the family side related to the child’s gender, only two had not felt any pressure. Family preferences might also be considered a direct pressure on the sex-selection, especially given that son preference in families is six times higher than that for girls, with 64.7% and 11.8%, correspondingly.

The Recent Observations on Statistics of the Sex-selective Abortions

According to the 2008-2019 report of the Ministry of Health of RA, the rates of the sex ratio have been fluctuating yearly. This hints at the level of sex-selective abortions since there is a 'naturally curated' sex selection ratio of 105-100(1.05). To understand the change occurring yearly, it is imperative to consider the drastic contrast between the rate of 1.2 given for the 2000s and the recent years' statistics. The birth ratio given for 2015 was 1.13. The latter improved in 2017 with a rate of 1.10. During 2018, there was a regress with an observed rate of 1.11.

According to RA Statistical Committee, the 2020 ratio of child sex selection has been 1.04 for the first child, 0.07 for the second, and drastically higher, 1.27 for the third and fourth children. Although there is a positive development, especially in the case of the third child, given for 2020 with the contrasting rate of 1.40 for the preceding 2019, sex selection is an existing problem in Armenia. According to the data provided by the Ministry of Health of Armenia in 2023, the ratio of boy-girl births in Armenia has again faced disbalance with the 1.11 rate, which shows an obvious error related to sex-selective abortions in Armenia.

The 2017 UNFPA "Prevalence of and Reasons for Sex-Selective Abortions in Armenia" research also revealed the regional distinction between attitudes toward sex selection. The study showed a direct inclination toward the male sex for the first child in Ararat, Shirak, and Lori regions. In slight contrast, for Yerevan and Syunik regions, the gender of the first child was not biased.

Legislative Regulations

According to RA law for, the second part of the 10th article for "Human Reproductive Health and Reproductive Rights" prescribes sex-selective abortions as prohibited after 12 weeks. Banning abortions for 12–22 weeks, when the gender of a child may be revealed, except for the medically assigned cases prescribed by the 8th part of the 10th article, was intended to stop sex-biased abortions. Unfortunately, regulatory measures are not fully efficient for such a complex problem for two reasons. First, the solution is not to regulate abortions since there is a chance of doing unregistered abortions. Secondly, the root of the problem is not sex-selective abortion but the social limits for the female gender.

According to the 2020 report of the RA Office of Human Rights, exploration of the regional cases exhibited two mechanisms for sex-selective abortions: medical and personal measures. The individual measures include abortion pills, namely Mifepristone, and specific traditional measures, which are not regulated by law. In slight contrast, medical abortions, despite being held by law, are considered to be conducted unlawfully. The exploration shows that there are no registered cases of abortion in smaller regional hospitals, which makes the officials assume that the latters are conducted without an authorized record.

Finding a solution will be complicated since the problem has latent edges. Besides legislative regulations, measures to enhance and elevate the female rights and societal role is essential. Ani Jilozian, a Women’s Support Centre member in Yerevan, calls the legislative intervention a "band-aid solution" rather than a fundamental remedy to traditional bias. Similarly, Lara Aharonian, the co-founder of the Women’s Resource Centre Armenia (WRCA), states that the problem should have been solved in a broader social context of gender inequality nurtured since childhood and female socioeconomic condition rather than regulations, which directly enhance the rates of unsafe abortions. Also, according to the World Bank 2015 Report "Exploring the "Phenomenon of Missing Girls" in South Caucasus states, measures for gender equality promotion should include increased female pressure-related resilience through economic empowerment, asset and agency access, safety, and social protection tools.

The Campaign to Urge to Stop Selective Abortions My Name is Enough

The name "Enough, Armenian:Բավական" apart from the Armenian lexical meaning enough, is also an Armenian female name. Statistically, families who wanted a boy, eventually, after their third girl, name her "Բավական" to signify that it is enough for them with girls. The namesake campaign "My Name is Enough" was produced to highlight the issue of sex-selective abortions, ranking Armenia in third place for frequency of sex-selective abortions among nations based on UN data. The campaign was produced by Doping Creative Agency in cooperation with the RA Ministry of Health and funded by the Armenia office of the United Nations Population Fund. The non-commercial campaign was begun on 11 October 2019, with the symbolic onset of the red lighting effect around the statue of "Mother Armenia." The statue "Mother Armenia" is not only a military symbol but also an icon signifying the role and collective essence of the Armenian Woman. Red coloring symbolized the sense of terror or the "STOP" sign. In complementarity, these two symbols state the need to stop the practice of sex-based abortions based on traditional and social bias, considering the true essence of an Armenian woman.

International Recognition

The campaign won awards and enhanced international recognition at several Festivals. During Kyiv International Advertising Festival, Doping Creative Agency won two gold awards in the "Out of home" and Advertising Campaign categories and a silver in the Media category. Further, at the 20th "Silver Mercury" International Festival "My Name Is Enough" social campaign won the highest silver award in the Social Advertising and Charity category. Similarly, at the International "Red Apple" advertising festival, “My Name Is Enough" won one gold and two bronze awards.

== Changes to Medical Abortion Term in Armenia (2024) ==
Women can access medical abortion even in out-of-hospital settings for up to eight weeks in Armenia since August 2024, according to legal reforms expanding reproductive rights. Amendments to the law "On Human Reproductive Health and Reproductive Rights" were adopted by the National Assembly of Armenia in the second reading on 12 July 2024.

Medical abortion, in particular, is essential as it is more accessible to women, especially those from regions, says Anna Hovhannisyan, Women Resource Center's Head of Advocacy. Surgical abortion, instead, creates a complete dependence on doctors and medical centers; while, according to the law, women still need to consult with a healthcare provider before they take the pills (that are provided with a prescription), medical abortion gives women the privacy and comfort of self-managing the abortion, she says.

Armenia, too, used to face a massive anti-choice wave back in 2014 and the following couple of years, Hovhannisyan says. It was also when the three-day waiting time was introduced, and sex-selective abortion was banned (according to law, women should wait for three days after declaring their decision to have an abortion to the doctor; this period is meant for women to weigh on their decision).

From the legal perspective, before these amendments, there was an explicit ban on all abortions performed in out-of-hospital conditions in Armenia, says Women’s Resource Center Advocacy team lawyer Nvard Piliposyan. When self-managing abortion, there are some side effects and underlying medical pre-conditions to be considered; women still need to consult with a doctor to have comprehensive information before the abortion, according to law. But now, it is possible to have a medical abortion at home or wherever women feel most private and comfortable, she says.

== See also ==
- Health in Armenia
- Women in Armenia
