= Abortion under communism =

Communist and Marxist ideologies generally allow state-provided abortions, although there is no consensus among Communist parties or governments as to how far into the pregnancy abortion should be allowed.

== Communist countries ==
=== People's Republic of China ===
Abortion in the People's Republic of China is generally legal and accessible, but has been subject to increasing restrictions in the 2020s. Abortions are widely accepted socially and are available to all women through China's family planning programme, public hospitals, private hospitals, and clinics nationwide. During China's one-child policy, women were subjected to forced abortions and many were subjected to forced sterilization on the orders of officials in some places.

To reduce the high number of sex-selective abortions, the Chinese government banned prenatal sex discernment in 1994.

In 2021, China's State Council as well as the non-governmental organization responsible for family planning announced measures to reduce non-medically necessary abortions in response to the country's declining birth rate. In 2023, a court in China ruled in favor of spousal consent for abortion.

=== Cuba ===
The Cuban government decriminalized abortion in 1965. Women have free access to abortion in Cuba, making it a "regional front-runner in women's rights," according to Reuters journalist Nelson Acosta. Late-term abortions require a formal evaluation that is conducted by a committee of gynecologists and a psychologist.

=== North Korea ===
The Penal Code from 1950 states that abortion is allowed for "important reasons" up to the seventh week of pregnancy, but that anyone who performs an abortion for no important reason is subject to up to three years' imprisonment. Broad interpretation of the phrase "important reasons" meant that abortion was available virtually upon request, and, reportedly, abortion services could be provided free of charge at provincial hospitals.

As of the UN's 2017 World Population Policies report, abortion is available in North Korea for all reasons, including upon request, and without gestational limits.

=== Vietnam ===
The Law of Protection of People's Health, passed in 1989, states that: "Women have the right to have an abortion, to receive gynecological diagnosis and treatment, health check-up during pregnancy, and medical service when giving birth at health facilities."

Vietnam has also adopted policies to ban and prevent sex-selective abortions, among other countries such as Nepal.

=== Laos ===
Under a legislation draft, abortion is permitted in the cases of:

- The pregnant individual has significant health conditions including heart disease, blood diseases, mental health issues, cancer, kidney disease, among others named in the legislation.
- The pregnant individual is a member of a low-income family, has more than four children already, or is below the age of majority.
- The foetus has an intellectual disability, or has been exposed to poison or over 15 rads of radiation.
- The foetus was otherwise lost.
- The pregnancy was a result of rape or birth control failure.

== Western Communist parties ==
In the Western world, a variety of communist and socialist parties support abortion on request.

=== Brazil ===
- The Brazilian Communist Party supports abortion on request, criticizing relationships between state and religion leading to its ban.

=== Canada ===
- In a 2017 statement, the Communist Party of Canada criticized then-President of the United States Donald Trump's anti-abortion policies, including his defunding of the pro-choice organization Planned Parenthood.

=== United States ===
- The Communist Party USA supports the right of abortion and social services to provide access to it, arguing that unplanned pregnancy is prejudiced against poor women. They condemned the Supreme Court's 2022 decision in Dobbs v. Jackson Women's Health Organization.
- The Party for Socialism and Liberation support free access to abortion. They criticized the Supreme Court's decision to reverse Roe v. Wade as "misogynistic" and "anti-democratic"

== Former Communist countries ==
Many historical Communist countries, primarily in Europe, allowed abortion on request or due to socioeconomic factors. The Soviet Union under Stalin and Romania under Ceaușescu, however, took action to further limit abortions, and other Communist countries retained prohibitive laws against them.

=== Afghanistan ===
The criminal code from 7 October 1976 only allowed abortion to save the mother's life. The socialist government never changed this law.

=== Albania ===
During Enver Hoxha's rule, abortion was only legally allowed to save mother's life, but in practice could be obtained for any reason. The punishment for a woman who had an abortion was social reprimand by re-education through work. By 1989, abortion was officially legalized in cases of rape, incest, and for women under 16 years old, among other reasons.

=== Angola ===
Abortion remained prohibited in Angola with exceptions to save the mother's life.

=== Benin ===
The civil code from 8 February 1973 only allowed abortion to save the mother's life, which the socialist government never changed.

=== Bulgaria ===
Abortion was legalized on 27 April 1956. It was only allowed once every 6 months, and no later than the 12th week of pregnancy, except for medical reasons. To increase the birth rate, the government restricted abortion for certain women in February 1968 by the Decree 188, which discouraged childless women and women with one or two children from having an abortion (although they could possibly have the procedure if they persisted). Only women with three or more children, or women over 45 years ago, had the right to an abortion on request. The time ceiling was also lowered to 10 weeks. In April 1973, women with just one child lost the right to abortion, except in cases of rape, incest, medical emergency, if the woman was an unmarried person under the age of 18, with no living children, or if she was over 45 years, old with a living child. By 1974, unmarried women were allowed to get an abortion.

=== Czechoslovakia ===
An abortion law passed in 1957 allowed termination for, both medical (forming 10% of the cases) and other reasons (the remaining 90%). The law was changed after 1957. The birth ratio decreased, falling below number of abortions.

=== East Germany ===
In East Germany, women under 16 years of age, women over 40, and mothers with at least four children were given the right to abortion after applying to a state commission. Abortion was fully legalized by parliament in 1972.

=== Ethiopia ===
Abortion was only allowed to "save the pregnant woman from the grave and permanent danger to life or health that is impossible to avert in any other way". Although the code does not accept broad health, judicial or socio-economic grounds, and doesn't specify whether a threat to health includes both physical and mental health, it does consider a "grave state of physical or mental distress, especially following rape or incest, or because of extreme poverty" a mitigating circumstance in sentencing.

=== Hungary ===
Prior to 1953, abortion was only allowed to save the mother's life. In 1953 and 1956, the laws legalized abortion until 12 weeks of pregnancy, in cases of socioeconomic factors. In 1973, although abortion was still allowed for social reasons, the list of other acceptable reasons was reduced.

=== Mongolia ===
Induced abortion in socialist Mongolia was allowed since 1940 to preserve the mother's health, officially recorded in the penal code on July 6, 1960. In 1986, the amendment authorized medical authorities to decide when to perform an abortion, and abortion was fully legalized in 1989.

=== People's Republic of the Congo ===
Abortion was prohibited, but the general principles of criminal law allowed abortions on grounds of medical necessity, with reports suggesting they were also permitted for less immediately dangerous complications.

=== Poland ===
Debates surrounding abortion started around 1929 in Poland. By 1932, abortion was considered legal if the pregnancy was a result of a crime where a woman's health was at risk. Despite the protests of the Catholic Church, abortion in Poland was allowed on social grounds in 1956 by the Communist government. Subsequently, it was fully allowed in 1959 to protect the life and morality of women that had unsafe abortions. The abortions were provided by public hospitals.

=== Romania ===
Before 1966, Romania had the most progressive laws of abortion in Europe. However, after the rise of power of Nicolae Ceaușescu, Decree 770 only allowed abortion to save the life of the mother. It was also allowed for women over 45 years old or with four or more children. In 1974, this age was lowered to 40 before being restored to 45 in 1986. The goal of the ban was a larger population that could drive a larger workforce and consumer-led growth, in order to achieve economic independence from the Soviet Union. Over the span of these 23 years, more than 2 million unwanted children were born and at least 10,000 women died as a result. The 770 Decree was one of the first laws to be repealed right after Ceaușescu's trial and execution on 25 December 1989; more than 1 million abortions were performed the year after, more than three times the number of children born that year.

=== Somalia ===
Since December 16, 1962, abortion was prohibited. The socialist regime never changed the law, but the criminal law's general principles of necessity allowed for an abortion to save the mother's life.

=== Soviet Union ===
In 1920, the Russian Soviet Federative Socialist Republic became the first modern country to legalize abortion.

In the USSR, during the Congress of Kiev in 1932, abortion was criticized for decreasing the country's birth rate. Abortion was finally banned on June 27, 1936. The number of officially-recorded abortions dropped sharply from 1.9 million in 1935 to 570,000 in 1937, but began to climb just two years later, reaching 755,000 in 1939. On November 23, 1955, the Presidium of the Supreme Soviet, under Nikita Khrushchev, liberalized abortion restrictions.

=== Yemen ===
The law of South Yemen only allowed abortion to save the mother's life, as with North Yemen.

=== Yugoslavia ===
Socio-medical indications were accepted as grounds for abortion from 1952. In 1969 the law was further liberalised.Article 191 of the federal constitution states that "it is a human right to decide on the birth of children". All the republics of Yugoslavia passed laws between 1977 and 1979 that regulated abortion; even if there were small disparities, the general common rule was "up to the tenth week of pregnancy and, beyond ten weeks, with the approval of a medical commission".

== Other Communist areas ==
=== Democratic Federation of Northern Syria ===
Although Syria only allows abortion to save a mother's life, the de facto autonomous region of the DFNS legalizes abortion for all women. Barbara Anna, a member of the Turkish Communist Party, reflected more broadly on how limits to women's bodily autonomy relate to the imposition of capitalism and imperialism. She compared the situations in the Middle East where women's economic activity and sexual freedom is heavily restricted to the situation in the neoliberal capitalist centre, where women's sexual freedom comes at the expense of constant objectification and commodification.

=== Revolutionary Armed Forces of Colombia ===
The Revolutionary Armed Forces of Colombia supported abortion, despite the laws of Colombia only allowing it in cases of rape, fetal defects, or a need to preserve the mother's health.

=== Paris Commune ===
Article XII states that: "The submission of the children and the mother to the authority of the father, who prepares the submission of each one to the authority of the chief, is pronounced dead. The couple consents freely to seek common pleasure. The Commune proclaims freedom of birth: the right to sexual information from childhood, the right to abortion, the right to contraception. As the products cease to be the property of their parents. They live together in their home and run their own lives." This was in sharp contrast to the French law at the time, which prohibited abortion.
