= Abortion in Belarus =

Abortion in Belarus has been legal since November 23, 1955, when Belarus was a republic of the Soviet Union. The current abortion legislation dates from December 31, 1987, and is one of the most liberal abortion laws in Europe. Abortion is allowed on request up to 12 weeks, and in specific circumstances, on a variety of grounds, until 28 weeks.

Live births + abortions in Belarus

Percentage of conceptions aborted in Belarus over time

The 1987 law allows abortion for the traditional reasons of harm or death to the fetus and/or mother, rape and incest, as well as:

- the death of the husband during pregnancy,
- a prison sentence for either the mother or father,
- a court order stripping the pregnant woman of parental rights,
- if a household already exceeds five children,
- if the relationship between mother and father ends in divorce,
- or a family history which includes mental or physical disabilities.

Once a popular method of birth control, abortions exceeded live births two-to-one in 1995. The rate had fallen by over 75%, with abortions numbering 42,000 (or 39% of the live birth rate) in 2008.

As of 2010, the abortion rate was 14.7 abortions per 1000 women aged 15–44 years.

Like many countries in Eastern Europe, Belarus's population has been falling since the end of the Cold War. To combat this, the Belarus government passed legislation in 2014 allowing doctors to refuse to conduct abortions. and gives benefits to encourage people to have more children.

According to a 2021 Chatham House survey, "63% of Belarusians believe that abortion should be legal in most or all cases", however "this number has fallen from 75% in Belarus since November of 2020".
