= Abortion in Greece =

Abortion in Greece has been fully legalized since 1986, when Law 1609/1986 was passed effective from 3 July 1986. Partial legalization of abortion in Greece was passed in Law 821 in 1978 that provided for the legal termination of a pregnancy, with no time limitation, in the event of a threat to the health or life of the person carrying the fetus. This law also allowed for termination up to the 12th week of pregnancy due to psychiatric indications and to the 20th week due to fetal pathology. Following the passage of the 1986 law, abortions can be performed on-demand in hospitals for people whose pregnancies have not exceeded 12 weeks. In the case of rape or incest, an abortion can occur as late as 19 weeks, and as late as 24 weeks in the case of fetal abnormalities. In case of inevitable risk to the life of the pregnant person or a risk of serious and continuous damage to their physical or mental health, termination of pregnancy is legal any time before birth. Minors must get written permission from a parent or guardian before being allowed an abortion.

Law 1609 also specifies that the abortion must be performed by a medical practitioner with a specialty in gynecology or obstetrics and with the assistance of an anesthesiologist; that the pregnant person is informed of the consequences of terminating the pregnancy, including the state that the state can provide some protection for the parent and child, as well as other family planning topics; that the parent's health is examined prior to the abortion; and that the hospital or private clinic where the abortion is performed meets particular specifications.

As of 2007, the abortion rate was 7.2 abortions per 1000 people aged 15–44 years.

== History ==
The modern Greek state and its penal system were created in the 1830s based on Bavarian laws. The system was designed by Georg Ludwig von Maurer and came into effect in 1835. Articles 303-305 addressed abortion, either performed by a pregnant woman or a third party.

Article 303–304:

If the mother who gave birth to a premature or dead infant used prior to that, knowingly, alone or with someone else, internal or external means, [means that] can cause a premature delivery or the death of the fetus in the mother's abdomen, she is punished with imprisonment. The same penalty is imposed on the midwives or pharmacists or others in the medical service who cause abortion with the consent of the pregnant woman or by recommending or by providing the means for performing such a felony.

These sentences carried a maximum punishment of ten years for both the pregnant person committing the act themself, as well as for any third party assistants. This law, although amended in the 20th century, remained effectively unchanged and enforced for 90 years. Nikolaos Kostes, the first professor of obstetrics at Athens University, distinguished between a emvyro (fetus), a vrefos (infant), and a kyema (literally, 'that which is conceived'). Kostes stated the fetal body parts could be discerned around the sixth week of pregnancy, and referred to the first three months of fertilized ova as 'the egg'. Historian Violetta Hionidou notes that academics like Kostes as well as laypeople did not consider early pregnancy to be a fetus. Therefore, if a person was pregnant in the early months of gestation was not considered a fetus, any action taken to terminate a pregnancy could not be punishable by law. In a 1905 Supreme Court case, a judge ruled that a necessary element of article 303 was that 'the mother gave birth to a dead or premature fetus'. The judge, N. Momferatos, ruled that without this evidence, the law could not be applied.

However, in 1927, a court case ruled that it was 'not necessary for the court to have knowledge that the fetus was alive before the attempted abortion'. The judge specifically clarified that article 303 applied "even when the conception is recent and the fetus had not started giving signs of life yet". Contradictorily, article 106 of the penal code specified that 'a person who undertook an illegal act in order to urgently protect their own or someone else's life' should not be punished. This clause was applied in abortion-related arguments as early as 1872.

=== Prior to legalization ===
Women in Greece gained the right to vote in 1952. Family planning became a topic of public discussion in Greece in the 1960s, though the conversation more focused on eugenics. In the 1970s, women's organizations became highly vocal on issues such as abortion and access to oral contraception. It was estimated that 300,000 illegal abortions were performed annually in the 1970s, as access to and information about contraception was virtually nonexistent. The women's movement organized protests and marches throughout Greece to bring attention and awareness to contraception and published informational material.

In 1976, a number of volunteers established the Greek Family Planning Association, with the help of Greek congresswoman Virginia Tsouderou and an independent gynecologist. In 1980 the Minister of Health, Welfare and Social Insurance, Spiridon Doxiadis, established 10 family planning clinics within selected major urban hospitals. When the National Healthcare Service (Greek: Εθνικό Σύστημα Υγείας) was established in 1983, Article 15 incorporated language on family planning issues, education and information about family planning, and methods of family planning as part of its defined targets. The stated intention was to create a family planning center within every provincial hospital and, separately, for all health centers - 16 in urban and semi-urban areas - to provide family planning services.

== Demographics ==
In the 1990s, it was estimated that 150,000 to 400,000 abortions occurred annually. However, because no central registry of abortions exists, it is difficult to obtain valid statistics for the number of abortions performed or on the frequently in different sub-groups, i.e. teenagers, immigrants, etc. In 2007, the abortion rate in Greece was 7.2 abortions per 1,000 women among people between the ages of 15 and 44 years old.

=== Age ===
From 2007 to 2014, teenage pregnancies constituted between 3 and 5 percent of all abortions obtained in Greece. In 2014, an estimated 25% of teenagers terminated their pregnancies. A survey in 2019 reported that one in ten teenage girls aged 15 to 19 years old had had at least one abortion.

== Accessibility and methods ==
90% of abortions performed in Greece are surgical abortions, due to the requirements of the law that mandate abortions be performed by an obstetrician-gynecologist with the participation of an anesthesiologist.
