= Abortion in Denmark =

Abortion in Denmark was fully legalized on 1 October 1973. Contemporary abortion law allows the procedure to be done electively if a woman's pregnancy had not exceeded its 18th week. Parental consent is required for minors below the age of 15, except in special circumstances. An exception is permitted for abortions after 18 weeks if the woman's life or health were in danger, or if certain other circumstances were proven, such as poor socioeconomic condition of the woman; risk of birth defects in the baby; the pregnancy being the result of rape; or of mental health risk to the mother.

== History ==
Percentage of conceptions aborted in Denmark

The Danish Code of 1683 called for the execution of any unmarried who terminated her pregnancy, and at least 17 women were executed on these grounds in the preceding period 1624–1663.

The Midwife Regulation of 1714 (Jordemoderforordningen) extended the death penalty to midwives who induced abortions, though it is unclear how often the penalty was effectuated. A 1760 case involving the use of illegal abortion drugs was settled administratively with a fine; a 1772 court case over a woman who died following the illegal administering of drugs likewise led only to a fine; and towards the end of the century, death sentences were routinely commuted.

With the new penal code of 1866, the maximum penalty was reduced to eight years of penal labor. In 1930 it was further reduced to two years in prison, and an exemption was added for pregnancies threatening the life of the mother.

The issue of liberal reforms in abortion laws was raised in public and political debate during the 1920s and 1930s, in parallel with the debate around sexual education and birth control.

Abortion was first allowed in 1939 by application; if the doctors deemed the pregnancy fell into one of three categories (harmful or fatal to the mother, high risk for birth defects, or a pregnancy borne out of rape), a woman could legally have her pregnancy terminated. A little more than half of the applications received in 1954 and 1955 were accepted; the low acceptance rates were linked to a surge of illegal abortions performed outside the confines of hospitals. An addendum to the 1939 law was passed on 24 March 1970, allowing elective abortions only for women under the age of 18 who were deemed "ill-equipped for motherhood", and women over the age of 38.

Abortion in Denmark was fully legalized on 1 October 1973, allowing abortion to be done electively if a woman's pregnancy had not exceeded its 12th week. Parental consent was required for minors below the age of 18, except in special circumstances. Exceptions were permitted for abortions after 12 weeks if the woman's life or health were in danger, or if certain other circumstances were proven, such as poor socioeconomic condition of the woman; risk of birth defects in the baby; the pregnancy being the result of rape; or of mental health risk to the mother. This reform marked a crucial step towards recognizing women's right to make choices about their own bodies. Decriminalization not only ensured access to safe abortion procedures but also aligned Denmark with evolving international standards on reproductive rights.

As of 2013, the abortion rate was 12.1 abortions per 1000 women aged 15–49 years, which is below average for the Nordic countries (Denmark, Finland, Iceland, Norway and Sweden). The vast majority of Danes support access to legal abortions. In 2007, polls found that 95% supported the right.

On 1 June 2025 the elective period was expanded up to the 18th week of pregnancy, and the age at which parental consent was no longer required was adjusted from 18 down to 15. This change was agreed politically on 3 May 2024; formally proposed (as 3 related laws) on 30 January 2025; and passed its final parliament vote on 24 April 2025.

== Abortion rights of minors ==
Danish law generally permits children to consent to medical procedures from the age of 15. This was not the case for abortion however until June 2025, prior to which parental consent was required until the age of 18.

A minor may petition the government to grant an abortion without parental consent, or (in special cases) even without informing the parents. Such requests number about 20 to 40 per year and are usually granted, though in 2014, one child was refused both parental consent and government exemption and forced to carry her pregnancy to term.

Already in 2003, the Green Left party proposed lowering the age at which an abortion can be had without parental consent to 15, in line with the general Danish age of medical autonomy, but despite securing support from a parliamentary majority, the law remained unchanged at the time. In 2023, the Danish government announced new plans to finally change the law. Children under the age of 15 would still need parental consent.

== Access to abortion services ==
Access to abortion services in Denmark is characterised by both the legal availability of the procedure and efforts to ensure a thorough and comprehensive distribution across regions. Abortion is legally permitted within specified gestational limits and under defined circumstances, such as preserving the woman's health or in cases of socio-economic considerations. This legal framework supports women's autonomy in reproductive choices.

The Danish healthcare system prioritises comprehensive access to abortion services. In both public and private healthcare facilities, they offer different services, contributing to widespread availability. The Danish Health Authority compiles and publishes detailed statistics on abortion procedures performed annually, offering transparency on the utilisation of these services. The authority's reports include information on the number of abortions, gestational ages, and relevant demographic data. Women of age groups around 18-25, says UN Women, are the one who approach abortion the most.

Furthermore, Denmark emphasizes the provision of information and counselling for individuals considering abortions. Women are entitled to receive accurate information about the procedure, its implications, and available alternatives. These counselling sessions are designed to support informed decision-making and ensure that the individual's choice aligns with her circumstances and values, helping them to make a choice that is well-informed and reflective of their personal situation and ethical considerations.

== Abortion methods and techniques ==
Abortion methods and techniques practiced in Denmark encompass a range of options tailored to individual preferences, medical considerations, and gestational stages. Medical abortions, which involve the use of medication to induce termination, are available within the first trimester. This method typically involves a combination of mifepristone and misoprostol, administered under medical supervision.

Surgical abortions are conducted both through aspiration and dilation and evacuation (D&E) procedures. Aspiration, often referred to as vacuum aspiration, is performed in the first trimester. It involves the gentle removal of the pregnancy through suction, usually completed within a brief outpatient procedure. D&E, on the other hand, is employed for pregnancies at later gestational stages. This surgical method entails dilating the cervix and evacuating the uterine contents.

The choice of method depends on factors such as gestational age, medical considerations, and patient preferences. Danish healthcare providers prioritize patient safety and well-being, adhering to established medical guidelines and standards of care for abortion procedures. Medical professionals ensure that individuals seeking abortions are informed about the available methods, their implications, and any potential risks.

== Key figures in abortion reforms ==
Organisations like the Danish Family Planning Association (Sex & Samfund) and women's rights advocacy groups have also been crucial in propelling progressive abortion reforms. These organizations have played active roles in raising awareness about reproductive rights, disseminating accurate information, and advocating for policies that prioritize women's well-being and self-determination.

== Faroe Islands ==
Abortion on the Faroe Islands is still governed by the Danish law of 1956, which restricts abortions to the aforementioned three circumstances (pregnancy harmful or fatal to the mother, high risk for birth defects, or a pregnancy borne out of rape), as Danish politicians were historically unwilling to impose the Danish abortion law on the more conservative Faroese population.

Abortion policy was formally devolved to the Faroese Parliament in 2018.

As of 2020, the abortion rate in the Faroe Islands was 2.9 abortions per 1000 women aged 15–44 years, about one-fourth the rate in Denmark. Additionally, some Faroese women travel to Denmark to have the procedure done.

In December 2025, the Faroe Islands parliament voted 17 to 16 to legalise abortion up to the 12th week of pregnancy from 1 July 2026.

== Greenland ==
Abortion in Greenland was legalized on 12 June 1975, under legislation equivalent to the Danish law.

As of 2019, the abortion rate in Greenland was 79.7 abortions per 1000 women aged 15–44 years, which is among the highest in the world and about six times higher than in Denmark; the number of abortions have exceeded live births every year since 2013. Despite being treated as a public health concern, the rate remains high.
