= Abortion in Monaco =

Abortion in Monaco is illegal except in cases of rape, fetal deformity, illness, or fatal danger to the mother. The most recent abortion legislation was enacted on 8 April 2009; before then Monaco had one of the strictest abortion laws in Europe, only allowing the procedure if there was deemed to be a very high risk of fatality for the woman.

The previous abortion law, from 1967, outlawed abortion under any circumstance, but other previous criminal law cases agreed abortion was acceptable if it saved the life of the woman. Under the old law, women undergoing an illegal abortion were subject to a prison term up to three years, with the abortion provider subject to a prison term up to five years. If the abortion provider was in the medical profession, their right to practice medicine would be taken away.

In August 2019, abortion was decriminalised in Monaco, though it was not legalised.

While abortion is partially legal in Monaco, Monaco itself is surrounded on three sides by France, where elective abortion care is completely legal and available. There are no known restrictions for Monegasque residents on getting abortions outside Monaco, and the nearest clinic to Monaco is circa 120m northwest of the Avenue d'Alsace border crossing.
