= Abortion in Bulgaria =

Abortion in Bulgaria has been legal on request within the first 12 weeks of pregnancy since 1 February 1990. Between 12 and 20 weeks, abortion is only permitted for women who suffer from certain diseases that may endanger her life or that of the child, and after 20 weeks abortion is only permitted if the woman's life is in danger or the fetus is severely genetically harmed.

Abortions were legalized by a decree of the Ministry of Public Health on 27 April 1956, providing for abortions for all pregnancies within the first twelve weeks on any grounds, and only on therapeutic grounds thereafter. They were severely restricted by a Government decree of February 1968, issued to counter declining birth rates. Most abortions required approval by a special medical board, and they were banned entirely for childless women, with only medical exceptions. Only women over 45 or with three or more children could obtain an abortion on request, except if the pregnancy was past 10 weeks or the woman had obtained an abortion in the previous six months. The restrictions were extended in April 1973 to cover women with no children or only one child; abortions could only be obtained in case of rape or incest, for unmarried childless women under 18, for women over 45 with one living child, or in cases of disease endangering the woman's life or the viability of the fetus. The restrictions were slightly relaxed in 1974, but most restrictions remained until the decree of 1 February 1990. Despite the restrictions, abortion rates remained very high, with more abortions than live births in every year between 1976 and 1990.

The abortion rate in Bulgaria, which was 21.3 abortions per 1000 women aged 15–44 in 2003, has been declining. As of 2010, it is 14.7 abortions per 1,000 women aged 15-44 years. The high abortion rate in Bulgaria has posed concerns for public health.

Mifepristone (medical abortion) was registered in 2013.
