= Vo v France =

European Court of Human Rights case

Vo v France is a 2004 court case heard by the European Court of Human Rights that is notable for raising the question of whether or not an unborn child is considered to have a right to life under Article 2 of the European Convention on Human Rights.

== Background ==
The case was brought by Mrs Vo, a French woman with Vietnamese heritage. During her pregnancy, Vo received substandard medical care—due in part to a mixup with another woman with a similar name, and Vo's lack of ability to speak French. This confusion led to her doctors attempting to remove a non-existent coil from her uterus, but in the process damaging her foetus. This led to her needing emergency hospital admission and the death of the foetus, which was between 20 and 21 weeks old at the time.

Mrs Vo attempted to have the doctor prosecuted for unintentionally killing her unborn child. On 3 June 1996, the French criminal court found the doctor innocent as the foetus was not considered viable, and thus was not a "human person" under the French Criminal Code (then Article 319, now Articles 221—226).

The Lyons Court of Appeal reversed the decision made by the court of first instance on 3 March 1997. This appellate decision was reversed again by the Court of Cassation on 30 June 1999.

Mrs Vo brought the case to the European Court of Human Rights, charging that the French government's failure to provide criminal penalties for accidentally destroying a foetus was incompatible with the state's duty to protect the right to life of the unborn child under Article 2. The case was heard by the Grand Chamber of the Strasbourg court.

== Decision ==
The European Court of Human Rights broke the issue into two components:

1. Does Article 2 apply to unborn children?
2. Does Article 2 require that criminal penalties must apply to unintentional homicides?

The court decided that the first of these questions can be sidestepped by means of the second question. The French government had not breached their duties under the Convention by not applying criminal penalties to the unintentional destruction of a foetus. The court then decided that the first question could thus be ignored, noting that the Convention and its subsequent jurisprudence had not "ruled out the possibility that in certain circumstances safeguards may be extended to the unborn child".
