= Abortion in Austria =

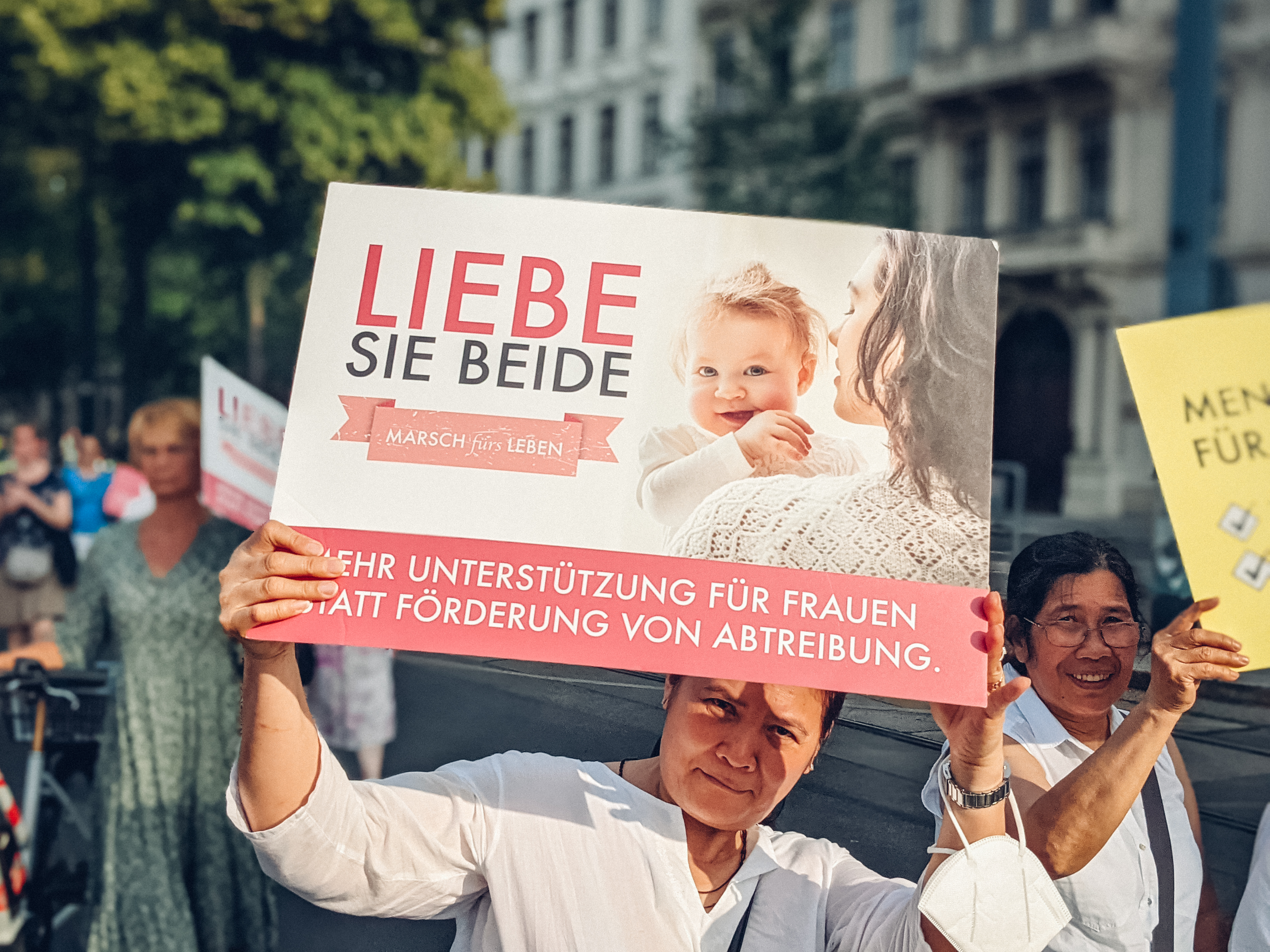
Anti-abortion protestor in Vienna.

Abortion in Austria has not been punishable by law during the first three months of pregnancy since 1 January 1975. Abortions can be performed later if there is a physical or mental health threat to the pregnant person, if there is an incurable problem with the development of the fetus, or if the patient is under the age of 14. Generally, performing or receiving an abortion is still officially considered a criminal offence.

There is no punishment for healthcare providers who choose not to perform abortions based on personal or religious convictions, except if the life of the woman is at stake and a lack of abortion causes the pregnant woman's death. The 1975 law protects both healthcare providers who choose to perform legally indicated abortions and also those who choose not to perform abortions. There are very few abortion clinics or hospitals with abortion capability outside major cities, making it next to impossible to have an abortion in rural areas. Abortions are not paid for by the government health system, unless they are medically indicated (e.g., to save the life of the pregnant woman).

In 2000, the abortion rate was 1.4 abortions per 1000 women aged 15-44 years.

Performing an abortion in Liechtenstein, which borders Austria, remains illegal in all but a few narrow circumstances. Some women who choose to terminate an unwanted pregnancy cross the border into Austria to undergo the procedure.

== History ==
For more than a century, the Austrian abortion policy was largely governed by the 1852 legislation that criminalized abortion. Both the woman willingly attempting to end her pregnancy and the individual conducting the abortion faced up to five years in jail. However, there were a few legal exceptions. If the pregnant woman's life were in urgent danger or her bodily and mental health would be significantly harmed by prolonging the pregnancy, there was no penalty if the pregnancy was the result of rape and use of force. Only the medical practitioner was permitted to conduct the abortion in these rare situations.

The Austrian Social Democratic Party, a party with a long history of women's movement activity, led the charge to relax nineteenth-century abortion laws. Female social democratic MPs proposed legalizing abortion during the first trimester of pregnancy in 1920. Party officials brought forth a fresh proposal in 1924 to allow abortion for medical, social, or eugenic grounds and recommendations for more excellent sex education and the construction of information centers. The abortion issue received a whole paragraph in the 1926 party platform.

In 1975, Austria became the second European country, and the first Catholic-majority country, to adopt a decriminalization approach to elective (i.e., not for medical reasons) abortions during early pregnancy.

== Timing ==
During the first three months, abortion is officially considered an offense but is never prosecuted.

Later in the pregnancy, there are only three legally acceptable reasons to perform an abortion:

- if there are "severe" or "serious" fetal defects,
- if the pregnant woman's life or health is "severely endangered" by continuing the pregnancy and no other alternative is possible; or
- the conception happened before the age of 14.

== Cost ==
As of 2023, the cost of a first-trimester abortion is estimated to be around 300–1,000 € plus the standard value-added tax. Elective abortions are generally not covered by the state-run health insurance. However, in Vienna and Tyrol, low-income women can apply in advance for funding.
