= Abortion in the Netherlands =

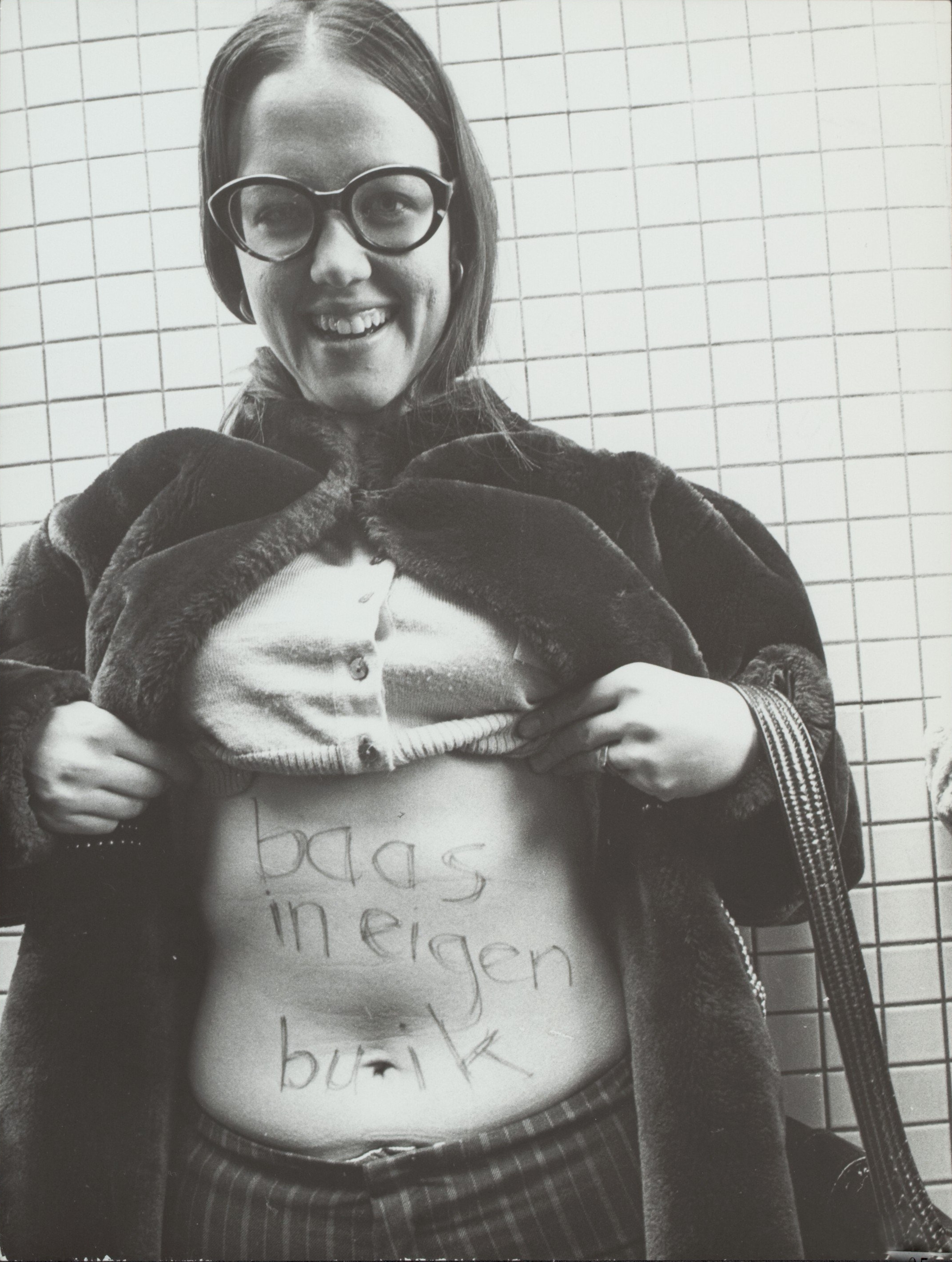
Pro-abortion rights demonstration in the Netherlands in 1971. The text written on her stomach reads: "baas in eigen buik" which translates in English loosely as "boss in your own belly"

Abortion in the Netherlands was fully legalized on 1 November 1984, allowing elective abortion up to the 24th week of the pregnancy. Abortion for "serious medical reasons" can be performed after 24 weeks. There used to be a mandatory five-day waiting period for abortions done after one's menstrual period is 17 days overdue. However, on 21 June 2022, Dutch parliament approved a law to scrap the mandatory five-day reflection period before undergoing an abortion, saying women with a joint consultation with the doctor, should be able to determine the time before making a decision. The law went into effect in January 2023.

== History ==
Abortion was deemed illegal under the Penal Code of 1886. Convictions were all but precluded, however, by a requirement that the prosecution prove that the fetus had been alive until the abortion. The Morality Acts of 1911 closed this loophole, and strictly barred all abortions, except those performed to save the life of the pregnant woman.

Legalization reached the forefront of public debate in the Netherlands during the 1970s as many other Western European countries liberalized their laws. The Staten-Generaal, however, was unable to reach a consensus between those opposing legalization, those in favor of allowing abortion, and those favoring a compromise measure. A controversial abortion law was passed in 1981 with single swing votes: 76 for and 74 against in the House of Representatives, and 38 for and 37 against in the Senate. The law left abortion a crime, unless performed at a clinic or hospital that is issued an official abortion certificate by the Dutch government, and the woman who is asking for the abortion declares she considers it to be an emergency. The law came into effect on 1 November 1984.

Currently, there are just over 100 Dutch general hospitals certified to perform abortions, and 17 specialized abortion clinics. More than 90% of abortions take place in the specialized clinics.

== Available procedures ==
In the Netherlands, abortion performed by a certified clinic or hospital is effectually allowed at any point between conception and viability, till 2022 subject to a five-day waiting period. The waiting period does not apply if the menstrual period is less than 17 days overdue (very early stage pregnancy). After the first trimester, the procedure becomes stricter, as two doctors must consent to treatment. In practice, abortions are performed until approximately 24 weeks into pregnancy, although this limit is the topic of ongoing discussion among physicians in the Netherlands, since, due to recent medical advancements, a fetus can sometimes be considered viable prior to 24 weeks. As a result of this debate, abortions are only rarely performed after 22 weeks of pregnancy. Abortions must be performed in a hospital.

Abortion in the Netherlands can completed with the use of different procedures including use of an abortion pill, vacuum aspiration, or dilation and evacuation.

=== The abortion pill ===
Since February 2000, the use of the abortion pill was legalized in the Netherlands. The pills are permitted to be taken up to 49 days after the first day of the last menstrual bleed. For most people, this is a timeframe of approximately three weeks. For this procedure, you get prescribed three pills. The pills need to be taken during an in-clinic appointments. With your last appointment you are required to stay for 4–6 hours for observation.

=== Vacuum aspiration ===
This is a procedure that uses a vacuum or suction device as a source to remove an embryo or fetus from the womb. This procedure is only available in certified medical clinics or hospitals.

=== Dilation and evacuation ===
This is a surgical procedure that is offered after the first trimester of pregnancy. This procedure completely removes the fetus and all placental tissue in the uterus. An other name for this procedure are surgical abortion. Sometimes this procedure is also used in case of an incomplete miscarriage.

== Number of abortions ==
The number of abortions has been relatively stable in the 21st century, around 28,000 per year. As of 2010, the abortion rate was 9.7 abortions per 1000 women aged 15–44 years (0.97%), one of the lowest in the world.

1 in 5 women in the Netherlands has experience with an unwanted pregnancy, however, only 13.5% of those unwanted pregnancies end with an abortion (as of 2015). However, since scrapping the mandatory 5-days wait period (rule went into effect in January 2023), abortion number has raised.

== See also ==
- Abortion in Belgium
- Abortion in the United Kingdom
- Abortion law
- Abortion debate
- Religion and abortion
