= Abortion in Azerbaijan =

Abortion in Azerbaijan is legal on request up to 12 weeks of pregnancy, and in specific circumstances between 12 and 28 weeks. The current abortion law of Azerbaijan is based on the abortion law of the Soviet Union of 1955 when Azerbaijan was a Republic of the Soviet Union (as the Azerbaijan Soviet Socialist Republic), and no changes were made after Azerbaijan became independent in 1991. Between 1965 and 1987 the abortion rate used to be very high (between 20 and 28%). Since independence, the abortion rate has almost halved and relatively stabilized after 2000 (between 12 and 14%). In the 2014, 13.8% of pregnancies in Azerbaijan ended in abortion, a slight rise from the all-time low recorded in 2005 (12.1%).

== History ==
As in all of the former USSR, Azerbaijan, known prior to 1992 as the Azerbaijan Soviet Socialist Republic, was subject to the abortion legislation and regulations of the former Union of Soviet Socialist Republics. As a result, abortion practices in Azerbaijan were similar to those throughout the former USSR.

The description given below pertains to the situation in Azerbaijan prior to independence. Since independence no changes have been made in the abortion law.

The Soviet Decree of 27 June 1936 prohibited the performance of abortions except in the case of a danger to life, a serious threat to health, or the existence of a serious disease that could be inherited from the parents. The abortion had to be performed in a hospital or maternity home. Physicians who performed unsafe abortions outside a hospital or without the presence of one of these indications were subject to one to two years' imprisonment. If the abortion was performed under unsanitary conditions or by a person with no special medical education, the penalty was no less than three years' imprisonment. A person who induced a woman to have an abortion was subject to two years' imprisonment. A pregnant woman who underwent an abortion was subject to a reprimand and the payment of a fine of up to 300 rubles in the case of a repeat offence.

In an edict of 23 November 1955, the government of the former USSR repealed the general prohibition on the performance of abortions contained in the 1936 Decree. Other regulations, also issued in 1955, specified that abortions could be performed freely during the first twelve weeks of pregnancy, if no contraindication existed, and after that point, when the continuance of the pregnancy and the birth would harm the mother (interpreted to include foetal handicap). The abortion had to be performed in a hospital by a physician and, unless the mother's health was threatened, a fee was charged. Persons who performed an abortion illegally were subject to criminal penalties established by criminal laws such as the Soviet Criminal Code. For example, if the abortion was not performed in a hospital, a penalty of up to one year's imprisonment could be imposed, and if it was performed by a person without an advanced medical degree, a penalty of up to two years' imprisonment was possible. In the case of repeat offences or the death or serious injury of the pregnant woman, a higher penalty of up to eight years' imprisonment could be imposed. A woman who underwent an illegal abortion was not penalized.

Despite the approval of the 1955 edict and regulations, the problem of illegal abortions did not entirely disappear in the former USSR. This situation resulted in part from the government's conflicted attitude towards contraception. Although at times it manifested support for contraception, it did little to make contraception available and in 1974 effectively banned the widespread use of oral contraceptives. The situation was also due in part to a revived pronatalist approach to childbearing adopted at times by the government, which looked unfavourably on abortion. The result was a reliance on abortion as the primary method of family planning.

Concerned with the high rate of illegal abortions, in 1982 the government issued a decree allowing abortions for health reasons to be performed through the twenty-eighth week of pregnancy. The government continued to extend the circumstances under which legal abortions were available, and on 31 December 1987 it issued another decree setting out a broad range of non-medical indications for abortions performed on request through the twenty-eighth week of pregnancy. These were: the death of the husband during pregnancy; imprisonment of the pregnant woman or her husband; deprivation of maternity rights; multiparity (the number of children exceeds five); divorce during pregnancy; pregnancy following rape; and child disability in the family. Moreover, the order provided that, with the approval of a commission, an abortion could performed on any other ground.

This extension of the grounds for abortion after the first twelve weeks of pregnancy, combined with the ambivalent attitude of the government towards contraception, led to a dramatic increase in the number of officially reported abortions. Other factors resulting in a high incidence of abortion have included shortages of high-quality modern contraceptives and reliance upon less dependable traditional methods; a lack of knowledge among couples of contraception and of the detrimental health consequences of frequent abortions; and the absence of adequate training for physicians, nurses, teachers and other specialists. In 1989, the availability of condoms in the entire former USSR amounted to only 11 per cent of demand; intrauterine devices (IUDs), 30 per cent; and pills, 2 per cent. Data from the 1990 all-union sample survey of contraceptive use indicate that, in Azerbaijan, 6.5 per cent of all women aged 15–49 years regularly used contraception, 10.1 per cent sometimes used contraception, 41.9 per cent did not use any contraceptive method and 35.3 per cent knew nothing about contraception.
