= National Supervisory Authority for Welfare and Health (Finland) =

- Native name: Sosiaali- ja terveysalan lupa- ja valvontavirasto Tillstånds- och tillsynsverket för social- och hälsovården
- Company type: Government agency
- Industry: Improving the management of health risks in the environment as well as legal protection and the quality of services in social welfare and health care
- Founded: 2009
- Defunct: 31 December 2025
- Headquarters: Helsinki, Finland
- Key people: Marja-Liisa Partanen, Director General
- Owner: Government of Finland
- Number of employees: ~150
- Website: www.valvira.fi/web/en

The National Supervisory Authority for Welfare and Health (Valvira; Finnish: Sosiaali- ja terveysalan lupa- ja valvontavirasto, Swedish: Tillstånds- och tillsynsverket för social- och hälsovården) is a centralised body operating under the Ministry of Social Affairs and Health in Finland. Its statutory purpose is to supervise and provide guidance to healthcare and social services providers, alcohol administration authorities and environmental health bodies and to manage related licensing activities.

Valvira was created through a merger of the National Authority for Medicolegal Affairs (Finnish: Terveydenhuollon oikeusturvakeskus; TEO) and the National Product Control Agency for Welfare and Health (Finnish: Sosiaali- ja terveydenhuollon tuotevalvontakeskus; STTV).
