= Mental disability =

Mental disability may refer to:

- Developmental disability, a chronic condition due to mental or physical impairments arising before adulthood
- Disabilities affecting intellectual abilities, medical conditions affecting cognitive ability including:
  - Intellectual disability, also known as general learning disability, a generalized neurodevelopmental disorder
  - Learning disability, where a person has difficulty learning in a typical manner
- Mental disorder, also called mental illness or psychiatric disorder, a behavioral or mental pattern that causes impairment of personal functioning
  - Neurodevelopmental disorder, a disorder of brain function
- Emotional and behavioral disorders, a disability classification used in educational settings

== See also ==
- Mental health
- Physical disability
