= Abortion in Turkey =

Abortion in Turkey has been legal on request since May 27, 1983. Abortion is legal up to 10 weeks of pregnancy, and in special circumstances the time threshold can be extended if there is danger to the woman's life or the life of the fetus. During the ten weeks, an abortion is allowed for the following reasons: the pregnancy threatens the woman's mental and/or physical health, the fetus would be physically or mentally impaired, if the conception occurred through rape or incest, and economic or social reasons. The woman's consent is required. If the woman is under the age of 18, then parental consent is required. If the woman is married, the consent of the husband is also required. Single women over the age of 18 can choose to have an abortion on their own.

Despite issues, the understanding and education about abortion has improved, and the procedure has become safer since its legalization in 1983. The legalization followed a period of high mortality rates among pregnant women seeking unsafe abortions due to the lack of access to the legal, professional procedure.

== History ==
In 1983, abortion was legalized in Turkey (it was passed in 1982 during the military government). In the past, abortions would happen in secret and were usually done in harmful and unsafe ways. Finally, in 1983 Turkey decided to legalize abortions, as they do in Tunisia, during the first trimester no matter what circumstances the mother faces. Out of all the countries in the MENA region, Turkey and Tunisia are the only two countries in this region that allow abortions under any circumstances during the first trimester. The rest of the Middle East only allows abortions if it affects the health of the woman. Because abortions were done in secret, they were done in harmful ways. It was one of the major reasons for the death of women at this time. Statistics show that deaths of women caused by harmful abortion methods stood at 50% in the 1950s. Also, in 1974, there were "208 maternal deaths for every 100,000 births."

== Protest ==
In 2012, thousands of people went out to protest against the anti-abortion law plan that the then-prime minister, Recep Tayyip Erdoğan, had in mind. A total of around 3,000-4,000 protesters went out to voice their opinions and speak against Erdoğan's decision. His decision, and two speeches he gave against abortion and cesarean births, caused the protest. The protest included women of all ages and they held banners including phrases such as "My body, my choice" and "I am a woman not a mother, don't touch my body."

== Issues with public hospitals ==
Due to the legalization of abortion, the percentage of maternal deaths caused by unsafe abortions is only 2% as opposed to the 50% in the 1950s. Also, in 2013, the number of maternal deaths was reduced to "20 maternal deaths for every 100,000 births" as opposed to the 208 in 1974. Although this holds true and abortions are legal, being able to get non-emergency terminations at public hospitals is difficult. It's shown that "only three out of thirty-seven public hospitals in the country" are allowing non-emergency terminations. A proposed law in 2012 stated doctors had the right to refuse to perform abortions for conscientious reasons, and could make waiting periods that would be mandatory. The law did not pass, but the influence and idea of it has caused health professionals to enact it on their own anyway. They are making it difficult for women to get abortions. Some hospitals have created a policy to inform fathers of the pregnancy of their daughters. There are also some that do not permit abortion services for women who are not married or are more than six weeks pregnant, although the law allows for abortions no matter the circumstance up until the tenth week of pregnancy.

== See also ==
- Abortion by country
- Abortion law
