= Abortion law =

Laws that allow, prohibit, or regulate abortion

Legality of abortion by country, state or territory Legal on request: No gestational limit; Gestational limit greater than 17 weeks from the last menstrual period (LMP); Gestational limit between 7 and 17 weeks from LMP; Gestational limit less than 7 weeks from LMP; Unclear gestational limit; Legally restricted to cases of: Risk to woman's life, to her health*, rape*, fetal impairment*, socioeconomic factors, or failure of contraception*; Risk to woman's life, to her health*, rape, or fetal impairment; Risk to woman's life, to her health*, or fetal impairment; Risk to woman's life*, to her health*, or rape; Risk to woman's life or to her health; Risk to woman's life; Illegal with no exceptions; No information; * Does not apply to some countries or territories in that category Note: In some countries or territories, abortion laws are modified by other laws, regulations, legal principles or judicial decisions. This map shows their combined effect as implemented by the authorities.

Abortion laws vary widely among countries and territories, and have changed over time. Such laws range from abortion being freely available on request, to regulation or restrictions of various kinds, to outright prohibition in all circumstances. Many countries and territories that allow abortion have gestational limits for the procedure depending on the reason; with the majority being up to 12 weeks for abortion on request, up to 24 weeks for rape, incest, or socioeconomic reasons, and more for fetal impairment or risk to the woman's health or life. As of 2025, countries that legally allow abortion on request or for socioeconomic reasons comprise about 60% of the world's population. In 2024, France became the first country to explicitly protect abortion rights in its constitution, while Yugoslavia implicitly inscribed abortion rights in its constitution in 1974.

Abortion continues to be a controversial subject in many societies on religious, moral, ethical, practical, and political grounds. Though it has been banned and otherwise limited by law in many jurisdictions, abortions continue to be common in many areas, even where they are illegal. According to a 2007 study conducted by the Guttmacher Institute and the World Health Organization, abortion rates are similar in countries where the procedure is legal and in countries where it is not, due to unavailability of modern contraceptives in areas where abortion is illegal. Also according to the study, the number of abortions worldwide is declining due to increased access to contraception.

== History ==
Abortion has existed since ancient times, with natural abortifacients being found amongst a wide variety of tribal people and in most written sources. The earliest known records of abortion techniques and general reproductive regulation date as far back as 2700 BC in China, and 1550 BC in Egypt. Early texts contain little mention of abortion or abortion law. When it does appear, it is entailed in concerns about male property rights, preservation of social order, and the duty to produce fit citizens for the state or community. The harshest penalties were generally reserved for a woman who procured an abortion against her husband's wishes, and for slaves who produced abortion in a woman of high status. Religious texts often contained severe condemnations of abortion, recommending penance but seldom enforcing secular punishment. As a matter of common law in England and the United States, abortion was illegal anytime after quickening—when the movements of the fetus could first be felt by the woman. Under the born alive rule, the fetus was not considered a "reasonable being" in rerum natura; and abortion was not treated as murder in English law.

In the 19th century, many Western countries began to codify abortion laws or place further restrictions on the practice. Anti-abortion movements were led by a combination of groups opposed to abortion on moral grounds, and by medical professionals who were concerned about the danger presented by the procedure and the regular involvement of non-medical personnel in performing abortions. Nevertheless, it became clear that illegal abortions continued to take place in large numbers even where abortions were rigorously restricted. It was difficult to obtain sufficient evidence to prosecute the women and abortion doctors, and judges and juries were often reluctant to convict. For example, Henry Morgentaler, a Canadian pro-choice advocate, was never convicted by a jury. He was acquitted by a jury in the 1973 court case, but the acquittal was overturned by five judges on the Quebec Court of Appeal in 1974. He went to prison, appealed, and was again acquitted. In total, he served 10 months, suffering a heart attack while in solitary confinement. Many were also outraged at the invasion of privacy and the medical problems resulting from abortions taking place illegally in medically dangerous circumstances. Political movements soon coalesced around the legalization of abortion and liberalization of existing laws.

By the first half of the 20th century, many countries had begun to liberalize abortion laws, at least when performed to protect the woman's life and in some cases on the woman's request. Under Vladimir Lenin, the Soviet Union became the first modern state in legalizing abortions on request—the law was first introduced in the Russian SFSR in 1920, in the Ukrainian SSR in July 1921, and then in the whole country. The Bolsheviks saw abortion as a social evil created by the capitalist system, which left women without the economic means to raise children, forcing them to perform abortions. The Soviet state initially preserved the tsarist ban on abortion, which treated the practice as premeditated murder. However, abortion had been practiced by Russian women for decades and its incidence skyrocketed further as a result of the Russian Civil War, which had left the country economically devastated and made it extremely difficult for many people to have children. The Soviet state recognized that banning abortion would not stop the practice because women would continue using the services of private abortionists. In rural areas, these were often old women who had no medical training, which made their services very dangerous to women's health. In November 1920, the Soviet government legalized abortion in state hospitals. The state considered abortion as a temporary necessary evil, which would disappear in the future communist society, which would be able to provide for all the children conceived. In 1936, Joseph Stalin placed prohibitions on abortions, which restricted them to medically recommended cases only, in order to increase population growth after the enormous loss of life in World War I and the Russian Civil War. In the 1930s, several countries (Poland, Turkey, Denmark, Sweden, Iceland, Mexico) legalized abortion in some special cases (pregnancy from rape, threat to mother's health, fetal malformation). In Japan, abortion was legalized in 1948 by the Eugenic Protection Law, amended in May 1949 to allow abortions for economic reasons. Abortion was legalized in 1952 in Yugoslavia (on a limited basis), and again in 1955 in the Soviet Union on request. Some Soviet allies (Poland, Hungary, Bulgaria, Czechoslovakia, Romania) legalized abortion in the late 1950s under pressure from the Soviets.

In the United Kingdom, the Abortion Act of 1967 clarified and prescribed abortions as legal up to 28 weeks (later reduced to 24 weeks). Other countries soon followed, including Canada (1969), the United States (1973 in most states, pursuant to Roe v. Wade—the U.S. Supreme Court decision which legalized abortion nationwide until 2022), Tunisia and Denmark (1973), Austria (1974), France and Sweden (1975), New Zealand (1977), Italy (1978), the Netherlands (1984), and Belgium (1990). However, these countries vary greatly in the circumstances under which abortion was to be permitted.

In 1975, the West German Supreme Court struck down a law legalizing abortion, holding that it contradicted the constitution's human rights guarantees. In 1976, a law was adopted which enabled abortions up to 12 weeks. After Germany's reunification, despite the legal status of abortion in former East Germany, a compromise was reached which deemed most abortions up to 12 weeks legal, but this law was struck down by the Federal Constitutional Court and amended only to remove the punishment in such cases, without any statement to legality.

In jurisdictions governed under sharia law, abortion after the 120th day from conception (19 weeks from LMP) is illegal, especially for those who follow the recommendations of the Hanafi legal school, while most jurists of the Maliki legal school "believe that ensoulment occurs at the moment of conception, and they tend to forbid abortion at any point [similar to the Roman Catholic Church]. The other schools hold intermediate positions. ... The penalty prescribed for an illegal abortion varies according to particular circumstances involved. According to sharia, it should be limited to a fine that is paid to the father or heirs of the fetus."

== Timeline of abortion on request ==
The table below lists in chronological order the United Nations member states that have legalized abortion on request in at least some initial part of the pregnancy, or that have fully decriminalized abortion. As of 2025, 67 countries have legalized or decriminalized abortion on request.

Where a country has legalized abortion on request, prohibited it, and legalized it again (e.g., former Soviet Union, Romania), only the later year is included. Countries that result from the merger of states where abortion on request was legal at the moment of unification show the year when it became legal across the whole national territory (e.g., Germany, Vietnam). Similarly, countries where not all subnational jurisdictions have legalized abortion on request are not included, leading to the exclusion of Australia, Mexico, and the United Kingdom. Countries where abortion on request was once legalized nationwide but has since been prohibited in at least part of the country, such as the United States and Poland, are also excluded. Countries are counted even if they were not yet independent at the time. The year refers to when the relevant law or judicial decision came into force, which may be different from the year when it was approved.

Year legalized	Countries	CpY	CC
1955	Armenia (Note: The former Soviet republics legalized abortion as part of the Soviet Union in 1955.); Azerbaijan; Belarus; Estonia; Georgia; Kazakhstan; Kyrgyzstan; Latvia; Lithuania; Moldova; Russia; Tajikistan; Turkmenistan; Ukraine; Uzbekistan	15	15
1957	China (Note: In 2021, the Chinese government issued guidelines reducing "non-medically necessary" abortions as a "step toward women's development". The guidelines do not provide detail on what a "non-medically necessary" abortion is, nor what specific policies the government has planned to achieve this goal.); Czech Republic (Note: The Czech Republic and Slovakia legalized abortion as part of the Czechoslovakia in 1957. The law from 1957 legalizing the abortion on request was limited in 1962 when additional approval for each abortion had to be obtained from so called Abort Commission (which rejected about 15% of the requests). The Abort Commissions were abolished by law in 1986. Until 1993 each approved abortion was paid by state.); Slovakia	3	18
1965	Cuba	1	19
1973	Denmark; Tunisia	2	21
1974	Singapore; Sweden	2	23
1975	Austria; France (Note: In some parts of Overseas France, abortion on request became legal in 2001.); Vietnam (Note: Year when all subnational jurisdictions legalized abortion on request.)	3	26
1977	Bosnia and Herzegovina (Note: The former Yugoslav republics legalized abortion as part of Yugoslavia in 1977.); Croatia; Montenegro; North Macedonia; Serbia; Slovenia	6	32
1978	Italy; Luxembourg	2	34
1979	Norway (Note: Including Svalbard. The law legalizing abortion on request was approved in 1978 and came into force in 1979.)	1	35
1983	Turkey	1	36
1984	Netherlands (Note: In the Caribbean Netherlands, abortion on request became legal in 2011.)	1	37
1986	Cape Verde; Greece	2	39
1988	Canada	1	40
1989	Mongolia	1	41
1990	Belgium; Bulgaria; Romania	3	44
1992	Germany (Note: After explicit legalization struck down by supreme court decision, the law only removes punishment for abortion on request but with no statement about its legality.)	1	45
1993	Guinea-Bissau	1	46
1995	Guyana	1	47
1996	Albania (Note: The law legalizing abortion on request was approved in 1995 and came into force in 1996.)	1	48
1997	Cambodia; South Africa	2	50
2002	Nepal; Switzerland	2	52
2007	Portugal	1	53
2010	Spain	1	54
2012	São Tomé and Príncipe; Uruguay	2	56
2015	Mozambique (Note: The law legalizing abortion on request was approved in 2014 and came into force in 2015.)	1	57
2018	Cyprus	1	58
2019	Iceland; Ireland (Note: The law legalizing abortion on request was approved in 2018 and came into force in 2019.)	2	60
2020	New Zealand	1	61
2021	Argentina (Note: The law legalizing abortion on request was approved in 2020 and came into force in 2021.); South Korea; Thailand	3	64
2022	Colombia; San Marino	2	66
2023	Finland (Note: Including Åland.)	1	67

Abortion-rights constitutional amendments
	Country	Date of passage
1	France	4 March 2024
2	Luxembourg	3 March 2026

== International law ==
There are no international or multinational treaties that deal directly with abortion but human rights law and international criminal law touch on the issues.

The Nuremberg Military Tribunal decided the case of United States v Greifelt and Others (1948) on the basis that abortion was a crime within its jurisdiction according to the law defining crimes against humanity and thus within its definition of murder and extermination.

The Catholic Church remains highly influential in Latin America, and opposes the legalisation of abortion. The American Convention on Human Rights, which in 2013 had 23 Latin American parties, declares human life as commencing with conception. In Latin America, abortion on request is only legal in Cuba (1965), Uruguay (2012), Argentina (2021), Colombia (2022) and in parts of Mexico. Abortions are completely banned in the Dominican Republic, El Salvador, Honduras and Nicaragua, and only allowed in certain restricted circumstances in most other Latin American nations.

In the 2010 case of A, B and C v Ireland, the European Court of Human Rights found that the European Convention on Human Rights did not include a right to an abortion.

In 2005, the United Nations Human Rights Committee (UN HRC) ordered Peru to compensate a woman (known as K.L.) for denying her a medically indicated abortion; this was the first time a United Nations Committee had held any country accountable for not ensuring access to safe, legal abortion, and the first time the committee affirmed that abortion is a human right. K.L. received the compensation in 2016. In the 2016 case of Mellet v Ireland, the UN HRC found Ireland's abortion laws violated the International Covenant on Civil and Political Rights because Irish law banned abortion in cases of fatal fetal abnormalities.

== National laws ==
While abortions are legal at least under certain conditions in almost all countries, these conditions vary widely. According to a United Nations (UN) report with data gathered up to 2019, abortion is allowed in 98% of countries in order to save a woman's life. Other commonly accepted reasons are preserving physical (72%) or mental health (69%), in cases of rape or incest (61%), and in cases of fetal impairment (61%). Performing an abortion because of economic or social reasons is accepted in 37% of countries. Performing abortion only on the basis of a woman's request is allowed in 34% of countries, including in Canada, most European countries and China.

The exact scope of each legal ground also varies. For example, the laws of some countries cite health risks and fetal impairment as general grounds for abortion and allow a broad interpretation of such terms in practice, while other countries restrict them to a specific list of medical conditions or subcategories. Many countries that allow abortion have gestational limits for the procedure depending on the reason; with the majority being up to 12 weeks for abortion on request, up to 24 weeks for social, economic, rape, or incest reasons, and more for fetal impairment or threats to the woman's health or life.

In some countries, additional procedures must be followed before the abortion can be carried out even if the basic grounds for it are met. How strictly all of the procedures dictated in the legislation are followed in practice is another matter. For example, in the United Kingdom, a Care Quality Commission's report in 2012 found that several NHS clinics were circumventing the law, using forms pre-signed by one doctor, thus allowing abortions to patients who only met with one doctor.

=== Summary tables ===
Legend
Permitted
Permitted, with complex legality or practice
Varies by subdivision
Prohibited, with complex legality or practice
Prohibited
Unknown or unclear

==== Countries ====
The table below summarizes the legal grounds for abortion in all United Nations member states and United Nations General Assembly observer states and some countries with limited recognition. This table is mostly based on data compiled by the United Nations up to 2019, with some updates, additions and clarifications citing other sources.

Legal grounds on which abortion is permitted in independent countries
Country	Risk to life	Risk to health	Rape	Fetal impairment	Economic or social	On request
Abkhazia	Prohibited	Prohibited	Prohibited	Prohibited	Prohibited	Prohibited
Afghanistan	Permitted (Note: The law of the Islamic Republic of Afghanistan consisted primarily of statutory law and a limited use of Islamic jurisprudence. The Afghan penal code criminalized abortion and only removed the penalty if the abortion was prescribed by a doctor to save the woman's life, but other sources said that Afghanistan also allowed abortion in case of fetal impairment, and rarely for economic reasons if accepted by a religious council. After the 2021 Taliban offensive, the new government announced its intention to implement Islamic law exclusively, and it is unclear which legal grounds for abortion it accepts.)	Prohibited	Prohibited	Prohibited	Prohibited	Prohibited
Albania	22 weeks	22 weeks	22 weeks	No limit	22 weeks	12 weeks
Algeria	Permitted	Permitted	Prohibited	Prohibited	Prohibited	Prohibited
Andorra	Prohibited (Note: The UN source says that this ground is not explicitly mentioned in the law but it is accepted as a general legal principle. However, other sources say that abortion is not legally allowed under any circumstance in Andorra.)	Prohibited	Prohibited	Prohibited	Prohibited	Prohibited
Angola (Note: The UN source incorrectly shows Angola as allowing abortion on request, citing a penal code draft from 2014 that did not become law. The version of the penal code enacted in 2020 and entered into force in 2021 allows abortion only in certain circumstances.)	Permitted	Permitted	16 weeks	Permitted	Prohibited	Prohibited
Antigua and Barbuda	Permitted (Note: A 2001 UN source says that abortion must be performed within the first 16 weeks and that it may be permitted after this period under very exceptional circumstances.)	Prohibited (Note: Before independence, a judicial decision in the parent country allowed abortion for this ground, but the decision has not been explicitly recognized by Antigua and Barbuda.)	Prohibited	Prohibited	Prohibited	Prohibited
Argentina	Permitted	Permitted	Permitted	14 weeks	Permitted	14 weeks
Armenia	Permitted	Permitted	Permitted	Permitted	22 weeks	12 weeks
Australia [subdivisions]	No limit	No limit	No limit	No limit	No limit	Varies (Note: Abortion for this ground is permitted in all subdivisions except the Northern Territory.)
Australian Capital Territory (Note: Also applies to Jervis Bay Territory.)	No limit	No limit	No limit	No limit	No limit	No limit
New South Wales (Note: Most laws of New South Wales and Queensland, including their abortion laws, are set to apply to Norfolk Island after 2026. The Criminal Code of Norfolk Island, which remains in force in the territory, does not prohibit abortion.)	No limit	No limit	No limit	No limit	No limit	22 weeks
Northern Territory	No limit	No limit	No limit	No limit	No limit	Prohibited (Note: Abortion up to 24 weeks may be performed if the medical practitioner considers the abortion is appropriate in all the circumstances, having regard to all relevant medical circumstances, the woman's current and future physical, psychological and social circumstances, and professional standards and guidelines. Later abortion may be performed, if two medical practitioners consider the abortion is appropriate in all the circumstances, having regard to the mentioned matters. These criteria are not considered as allowing abortion on request.)
Queensland	No limit	No limit	No limit	No limit	No limit	22 weeks
South Australia	No limit	No limit	No limit	No limit	No limit	22 weeks and 6 days
Tasmania	No limit	No limit	No limit	No limit	No limit	16 weeks
Victoria	No limit	No limit	No limit	No limit	No limit	24 weeks
Western Australia (Note: Also applies to Christmas Island and the Cocos (Keeling) Islands.)	No limit	No limit	No limit	No limit	No limit	23 weeks
Austria	No limit	No limit	3 months (Note: If the woman was under age 14 when getting pregnant, no limit is specified.)	No limit	3 months	3 months
Azerbaijan	No limit	No limit	Permitted	Permitted	22 weeks	12 weeks
Bahamas	Permitted	Permitted (Note: The penal code says that abortion is permitted for therapeutic purposes but is unclear whether it means only to save the woman's life or also to preserve her health. The UN source marks it as a permitted ground.)	Prohibited	Prohibited	Prohibited	Prohibited
Bahrain	Permitted	Prohibited (Note: The UN source marks it as a legal ground because the Penal Code explicitly prohibits abortion only if performed without the consent of the woman and of a medical practitioner. However, the decree regulating medical practice prohibits abortion unless the pregnancy threatens the woman's life.)	Prohibited	Prohibited	Prohibited	Prohibited
Bangladesh	No limit	Prohibited (Note: The UN source does not explicitly mark this legal ground for abortion but says that "Menstrual regulation is available on request for women with a last menstrual period of 10 weeks or less.")	Prohibited	Prohibited	Prohibited	Prohibited
Barbados	No limit	No limit	12 weeks	No limit	12 weeks	Prohibited
Belarus (Note: The law permits abortion for medical reasons without gestational limit, for social reasons up to 22 weeks of gestation, and on request up to 12 weeks of gestation. By regulation, fetal impairment is included as a medical reason, and rape is included as a social reason.)	No limit	No limit	22 weeks	No limit	22 weeks	12 weeks
Belgium	No limit	No limit	14 weeks (Note: Defined as 12 weeks from conception, considered as 14 weeks from the last menstrual period.)	No limit	14 weeks	14 weeks
Belize	No limit	No limit	Prohibited	No limit	Permitted	Prohibited
Benin	Permitted	Permitted	Permitted	Permitted	12 weeks	Prohibited
Bhutan (Note: The penal code prohibits abortion except to save the woman's life, when the pregnancy is a result of rape or incest, or when the woman is of unsound mental condition. Guidelines for health workers mention grounds of risk to the woman's health and fetal impairment, and define a gestational limit of 180 days.)	180 days	180 days (Note: This ground is only cited in guidelines for health workers, not by law.)	180 days	180 days	Prohibited	Prohibited
Bolivia	22 weeks	22 weeks	22 weeks	22 weeks (Note: This ground is established by a regulation implementing a judicial decision, although it is not mentioned in the decision itself or in the law.)	Prohibited	Prohibited
Bosnia and Herzegovina [subdivisions]	No limit	No limit	Permitted	Permitted	Permitted	10 weeks
Brčko District (Note: Continues to apply the abortion law of the Socialist Republic of Bosnia and Herzegovina.)	No limit	No limit	20 weeks	20 weeks	10 weeks	10 weeks
Federation of Bosnia and Herzegovina	No limit	No limit	20 weeks	20 weeks	10 weeks	10 weeks
Republika Srpska	No limit	No limit	No limit	No limit	No limit	10 weeks
Botswana	16 weeks	16 weeks	16 weeks	16 weeks	Prohibited	Prohibited
Brazil	No limit	Prohibited	No limit	Prohibited (Note: The penal code criminalizes abortion except if done to save the woman's life or if the pregnancy is the result of rape. Due to a decision by the Supreme Federal Court, abortion is also permitted in case of anencephaly, and it may also be authorized by court order in other fatal cases of fetal impairment.)	Prohibited	Prohibited
Brunei	Permitted	Prohibited	Prohibited	Prohibited	Prohibited	Prohibited
Bulgaria	No limit	20 weeks	Permitted	No limit	12 weeks	12 weeks
Burkina Faso	No limit	No limit	14 weeks	No limit	Prohibited	Prohibited
Burundi	Permitted	Permitted	Prohibited	Prohibited	Prohibited (Note: The penal code says that social demands are taken into account in a conviction for abortion. It is unclear if this circumstance reduces the penalty or may remove it.)	Prohibited
Cambodia	No limit	12 weeks	No limit	No limit	12 weeks	12 weeks
Cameroon	Permitted	28 weeks	28 weeks	Prohibited	Prohibited	Prohibited
Canada (Note: There is no criminal law in Canada relating to abortion, but provincial medical regulations may limit the availability of abortion services, depending on gestational age and medical reasons.)	No limit	No limit	No limit	No limit	No limit	No limit
Cape Verde	No limit	No limit	12 weeks	Permitted	12 weeks	12 weeks
Central African Republic	8 weeks	Prohibited (Note: The penal code says that abortion may be permitted to an underage woman in a state of grave distress up to 8 weeks.)	8 weeks	8 weeks	Prohibited	Prohibited
Chad	Permitted	Permitted	Permitted	Permitted	Prohibited	Prohibited
Chile	No limit	Prohibited	12 weeks (Note: If the woman is under age 14, the gestational limit is 14 weeks.)	Permitted	Prohibited	Prohibited
China [subdivisions]	Permitted	Permitted	Permitted	Permitted	Varies (Note: Abortion for this ground is permitted in mainland China and Hong Kong, but not in Macau.)	Varies (Note: Abortion for this ground is permitted in mainland China, but not in Hong Kong or Macau.)
Mainland China	Permitted	Permitted	Permitted	Permitted	Permitted	Permitted
Hong Kong	No limit	24 weeks	24 weeks	24 weeks	24 weeks	Prohibited
Macau	No limit	No limit	24 weeks	24 weeks	Prohibited	Prohibited
Colombia	No limit (Note: This ground is not explicitly mentioned in the law but it is established by judicial decision.)	No limit	No limit	No limit	24 weeks	24 weeks
Comoros	Permitted	Permitted	Prohibited	Prohibited	Prohibited	Prohibited
Congo	Permitted (Note: This ground is not explicitly mentioned in the law. The Charter of Rights and Freedoms, which is declared to be an integral part of the constitution, says that "Abortion, other than therapeutic, is prohibited and punishable by law." It is unclear whether the therapeutic ground means only to save the woman's life or also to preserve her health. The UN source says that only the ground to save the woman's life is accepted as a general legal principle.)	Prohibited	Prohibited	Prohibited	Prohibited	Prohibited
Costa Rica	Permitted	Permitted	Prohibited (Note: A judicial pardon may be granted to the woman for an abortion on this ground.)	Prohibited	Prohibited	Prohibited
Croatia	No limit	No limit	No limit	No limit	10 weeks	10 weeks
Cuba	No limit	22 weeks	No limit	35 weeks	22 weeks	12 weeks
Cyprus	Permitted	Permitted	19 weeks	Permitted	12 weeks	12 weeks
Czech Republic	No limit	Permitted (Note: In some cases, the gestational limit is 12 or 24 weeks.)	12 weeks	No limit	12 weeks	12 weeks
Democratic Republic of the Congo	Permitted (Note: This ground is not explicitly mentioned in the law but it is accepted as a general legal principle, allowed by regulation and established by treaty.)	Permitted (Note: This ground is not explicitly mentioned in the law but it is established by treaty, whose application is requested by the Constitutional Court.)	Permitted	Permitted	Prohibited	Prohibited
Denmark	No limit	No limit	Viability	No limit	Viability	18 weeks (Note: If the woman is of young age or immature and so unable to care for the child in a proper way, abortion may be allowed up to fetal viability.)
Djibouti	Permitted	Permitted	Prohibited	Prohibited	Prohibited	Prohibited
Dominica	Permitted	Prohibited (Note: Before independence, a judicial decision in the parent country allowed abortion for this ground, but the decision has not been explicitly recognized by Dominica.)	Prohibited	Prohibited	Prohibited	Prohibited
Dominican Republic	Permitted	Prohibited	Prohibited	Prohibited	Prohibited	Prohibited
East Timor (Note: The UN source shows East Timor as allowing abortion also in case of risk to the woman's health or fetal impairment, citing the penal code enacted in March 2009 and entered into force in June 2009. However, the penal code was amended in July 2009 to restrict abortion only to save the woman's life.)	No limit	Prohibited	Prohibited	Prohibited	Prohibited	Prohibited
Ecuador	Permitted	Permitted	Permitted (Note: This ground is explicitly mentioned in the law only in case of rape of a woman with a mental disability, but it is also established by judicial decision in case of rape of any woman.)	Prohibited	Prohibited	Prohibited
Egypt	Permitted	Permitted	Prohibited	Prohibited	Prohibited	Prohibited
El Salvador	Prohibited	Prohibited	Prohibited	Prohibited	Prohibited	Prohibited
Equatorial Guinea	12 weeks	12 weeks	12 weeks	12 weeks	Prohibited	Prohibited
Eritrea	Permitted	Permitted	Permitted	Prohibited (Note: Abortion is permitted if the woman is under age 18.)	Prohibited	Prohibited
Estonia	22 weeks	22 weeks	12 weeks (Note: If the woman is under age 15 or over age 45, the gestational limit is 22 weeks.)	22 weeks	12 weeks	12 weeks
Eswatini	Permitted	Permitted	Permitted	Permitted	Prohibited	Prohibited
Ethiopia	28 weeks	28 weeks	28 weeks	28 weeks	Prohibited (Note: Permitted up to 28 weeks of gestation if the woman is unfit to raise the child due to a physical or mental disability or for being under age 18. The penalty for abortion may be mitigated in case of extreme poverty.)	Prohibited
Fiji	No limit	No limit	20 weeks	No limit	Prohibited	Prohibited
Finland	No limit	No limit	20 weeks	24 weeks	20 weeks	12 weeks
France (Note: Including Overseas France.)	No limit	No limit	16 weeks (Note: Defined as 14 weeks of pregnancy, considered as 16 weeks from the last menstrual period.)	No limit	16 weeks	16 weeks
Gabon	10 weeks	Prohibited (Note: The penal code says that abortion may be permitted to an underage woman in a state of grave distress up to 10 weeks.)	10 weeks	10 weeks	Prohibited	Prohibited
Gambia	Permitted	Prohibited	Prohibited	Permitted	Prohibited	Prohibited
Georgia	22 weeks	22 weeks	22 weeks	22 weeks	12 weeks	12 weeks
Germany	No limit	No limit	12 weeks	12 weeks (Note: The criminal code specifies that abortion is not deemed an offence if the woman requests it, she has obtained counselling, and it is done by a physician within 12 weeks from conception. (Also, the woman is not punished for an abortion within 22 weeks if the other conditions are fulfilled.) The woman's living conditions are also taken into account in the indication of a serious risk to her health.)	12 weeks	12 weeks
Ghana	28 weeks	28 weeks	28 weeks	28 weeks	Prohibited	Prohibited
Greece	No limit	No limit	19 weeks	24 weeks	12 weeks (Note: If the woman is a minor or incapable of resisting, the gestational limit is 19 weeks.)	12 weeks
Grenada	Permitted	Permitted	Prohibited	Prohibited	Prohibited	Prohibited
Guatemala	Permitted	Prohibited	Prohibited	Prohibited	Prohibited	Prohibited
Guinea	Permitted	Permitted	Permitted	Permitted	Prohibited	Prohibited
Guinea-Bissau	Permitted (Note: The penal code prohibits abortion only if done without the woman's consent, outside health care facilities or without professional qualification. The law on reproductive health and family planning says that voluntary interruption of pregnancy is authorized according to the law on abortion, but no specific law on abortion exists as of 2022. A report by the Ministry of Public Health mentioned a gestational limit of 12 weeks.)	Permitted	Permitted	Permitted	Permitted	Permitted
Guyana	No limit	No limit	16 weeks	16 weeks	8 weeks (Note: If the woman is HIV-positive or contraception failure, the gestational limit is 16 weeks.)	8 weeks
Haiti (Note: A new penal code, published by presidential decree on 24 June 2020 and amended by the Council of Ministers on 24 June 2025, would allow abortion on request in the first 12 weeks of pregnancy, and in case of risk to the woman's physical or mental health, rape or incest. In July 2026, it was expected to entry into force on 1 January 2027.)	Permitted (Note: This ground is not explicitly mentioned in the law but it is accepted as a general legal principle.)	Prohibited	Prohibited	Prohibited	Prohibited	Prohibited
Honduras	Prohibited	Prohibited	Prohibited	Prohibited	Prohibited	Prohibited
Hungary	No limit	12 weeks (Note: Up to 18 weeks if the woman is incapacitated or did not recognize the pregnancy due to illness or medical error, or in case of failure of a health institution.)	12 weeks	20 weeks (Note: Up to 24 weeks in case of prolongation of the diagnostic procedure, or no limit in case of fetal abnormality incompatible with life after birth.)	12 weeks	Prohibited
Iceland	No limit	22 weeks	22 weeks	No limit	22 weeks	22 weeks
India	No limit	24 weeks	24 weeks	24 weeks (Note: No limit in case of "substantial foetal abnormalities".)	24 weeks (Note: Including the failure of contraception.)	Prohibited
Indonesia	No limit	No limit	14 weeks	No limit	Prohibited	Prohibited
Iran	4 months	4 months	Prohibited (Note: This ground is not explicitly mentioned in the law, but it may be included in other legal grounds if the pregnancy causes unbearable hardship, such as significant harm to mental health or risk of suicide.)	4 months	Prohibited	Prohibited
Iraq	Permitted (Note: This ground is not explicitly mentioned in the law but it is accepted as a general legal principle.)	Prohibited (Note: This ground is only cited in instructions to health committees, not by law.)	Prohibited	Prohibited	Prohibited	Prohibited
Ireland	Viability (Note: If the risk to life or health is immediate, no gestational limit is specified.)	Viability	12 weeks	Permitted	12 weeks	12 weeks
Israel	Permitted	Permitted	Permitted	Permitted	Permitted (Note: Abortion is permitted if the woman is under age 18 or over age 40, or if she is not married or the pregnancy is not from marriage.)	Prohibited
Italy	No limit	Viability	90 days	90 days	90 days	90 days
Ivory Coast	Permitted	Permitted	Permitted	Prohibited (Note: The UN source marks it as a legal ground but it is only mentioned by treaty, not implemented in the law.)	Prohibited	Prohibited
Jamaica	Permitted (Note: This ground is not explicitly mentioned in the law but it is accepted as a general legal principle and established by judicial decision.)	Permitted (Note: This ground is not explicitly mentioned in the law but it is established by judicial decision.)	Prohibited	Prohibited	Prohibited	Prohibited
Japan	22 weeks	22 weeks	22 weeks	Prohibited	22 weeks	Prohibited
Jordan	Permitted	Permitted	Prohibited	Prohibited	Prohibited	Prohibited
Kazakhstan	No limit	No limit	22 weeks	No limit	22 weeks	12 weeks
Kenya	Permitted	Permitted	Permitted (Note: This ground is not explicitly mentioned in the law but it is established by judicial decision. It is also mentioned in the National Guidelines on Management of Sexual Violence.)	Prohibited	Prohibited	Prohibited
Kiribati	Permitted	Prohibited	Prohibited	Prohibited	Prohibited	Prohibited
Kosovo	No limit	No limit	22 weeks	No limit	10 weeks	10 weeks
Kuwait	Permitted	4 months	Prohibited	4 months	Prohibited	Prohibited
Kyrgyzstan	No limit	No limit	22 weeks	22 weeks	22 weeks	12 weeks
Laos	Permitted (Note: The penal code prohibits "unlawful abortion", defined as "abortion not authorized by medical doctor commission". The penal code also lists the principles of legitimate defense and necessity to save one's life, which lead to exemption from penal liability. A decision by the Ministry of Health states that abortion is medically authorized, up to 28 weeks of gestation, due to certain medical conditions of the woman or fetus, rape, contraception failure, and certain socioeconomic conditions of the woman or her family. A WHO source also shows Laos as allowing abortion on request up to 12 weeks of gestation, citing guidelines for health workers from 2016, but they were issued before the penal code of 2017 defined "unlawful abortion" and are not mentioned in the decision by the Ministry of Health of 2021.)	28 weeks	28 weeks	28 weeks	28 weeks	Prohibited
Latvia	Permitted	24 weeks	12 weeks	12 weeks	12 weeks	12 weeks
Lebanon	Permitted	Prohibited	Prohibited	Prohibited	Prohibited	Prohibited
Lesotho	Permitted	Permitted	Permitted	Permitted	Prohibited	Prohibited
Liberia	24 weeks	24 weeks	24 weeks	24 weeks	Prohibited	Prohibited
Libya	Permitted	Prohibited	Prohibited	Prohibited	Prohibited	Prohibited
Liechtenstein	Permitted	Permitted	Permitted	Prohibited	Prohibited	Prohibited
Lithuania	No limit	No limit	12 weeks (Note: If the woman is under age 13 or over age 49, no limit is specified.)	No limit	12 weeks	12 weeks
Luxembourg	No limit	No limit	14 weeks	No limit	14 weeks	14 weeks
Madagascar	Prohibited (Note: This ground is not explicitly mentioned in the law. The UN source says that it is accepted as a general legal principle, but other sources say that abortion is not legally allowed under any circumstance in Madagascar.)	Prohibited	Prohibited	Prohibited	Prohibited	Prohibited
Malawi	Permitted	Prohibited	Prohibited	Prohibited	Prohibited	Prohibited
Malaysia	22 weeks	22 weeks	Prohibited	Prohibited	Prohibited	Prohibited
Maldives (Note: The law of Maldives is a combination of statutory and Islamic law. The Maldivian penal code criminalizes abortion after 120 days of gestation, except for risk to the woman's life. The Maldivian Islamic jurisprudence allows abortion only for risk to the woman's life, without gestational limit, or in cases of rape, incest, or certain medical conditions of a fetus conceived in marriage, up to 120 days of gestation.)	No limit	Prohibited	120 days	120 days (Note: Only for certain medical conditions of a fetus conceived in marriage.)	Prohibited	Prohibited
Mali	Permitted	Permitted	Permitted	Prohibited	Prohibited	Prohibited
Malta	Viability	Prohibited	Prohibited	Prohibited	Prohibited	Prohibited
Marshall Islands	Permitted	Prohibited	Prohibited	Prohibited	Prohibited	Prohibited
Mauritania	Permitted (Note: The penal code prohibits abortion without any explicit exception, but the UN source says that abortion to save the woman's life is permitted as a general legal principle. The law on child protection prohibits abortion except for a "proven medical need", and the law on reproductive health prohibits abortion except in case of risk to the woman's life. The government has stated that the law of the country permits abortion on therapeutic grounds.)	Prohibited	Prohibited	Prohibited	Prohibited	Prohibited
Mauritius	No limit	No limit	14 weeks	No limit	Prohibited	Prohibited
Mexico [subdivisions]	Varies (Note: Abortion for this ground is permitted by law in all subdivisions except Guanajuato and Querétaro. In these two states, people who violate it may be prosecuted but not imprisoned, and they may request judicial relief by amparo.)	Varies (Note: Abortion for this ground is permitted by law in some states and Mexico City. In other states, people who violate it may be prosecuted but not imprisoned, and they may request judicial relief by amparo.)	Permitted (Note: The penal codes of some states specify a gestational limit for abortion in case of rape. In July 2021, the Supreme Court ruled that it was unconstitutional to set a limit for abortion on this ground, but the ruling only granted relief to the plaintiff and did not automatically invalidate the limit in the penal code.)	Varies	Varies	Varies
Aguascalientes	6 weeks	6 weeks	No limit	No limit	6 weeks	6 weeks
Baja California	No limit	No limit	No limit	No limit	12 weeks	12 weeks
Baja California Sur	No limit	No limit	No limit	No limit	12 weeks	12 weeks
Campeche	No limit	No limit	No limit	No limit	No limit	12 weeks
Chiapas	No limit	12 weeks	No limit	No limit	12 weeks	12 weeks
Chihuahua	No limit	No limit	90 days	Permitted (Note: This ground is not explicitly mentioned in the law but it is established by judicial decision.)	Permitted	Permitted
Coahuila	No limit	No limit	12 weeks	No limit	Permitted (Note: This ground is not explicitly mentioned in the law but it is established by judicial decision.)	Permitted
Colima	No limit	No limit	No limit	No limit	12 weeks	12 weeks
Durango	No limit	Prohibited	No limit	Prohibited	Prohibited	Prohibited
Guanajuato	Prohibited	Prohibited	No limit	Prohibited	Prohibited	Prohibited
Guerrero	No limit	No limit	No limit	No limit	12 weeks	12 weeks
Hidalgo	No limit	No limit	No limit	No limit	12 weeks	12 weeks
Jalisco	No limit	No limit	No limit	No limit	12 weeks	12 weeks
Mexico City	No limit	No limit	No limit	No limit	12 weeks	12 weeks
Mexico State	No limit	No limit	No limit	No limit	12 weeks	12 weeks
Michoacán	No limit	Permitted	No limit	Permitted	No limit	12 weeks
Morelos	No limit	Prohibited	No limit	No limit	Prohibited	Prohibited
Nayarit	No limit	No limit	No limit	No limit	12 weeks	12 weeks
Nuevo León	No limit	No limit	No limit	Prohibited	Prohibited	Prohibited
Oaxaca	No limit	No limit	No limit	No limit	12 weeks	12 weeks
Puebla	No limit	12 weeks	No limit	No limit	12 weeks	12 weeks
Querétaro	Prohibited	Prohibited	No limit	Prohibited	Prohibited	Prohibited
Quintana Roo	No limit	No limit	No limit	No limit	12 weeks	12 weeks
San Luis Potosí	12 weeks	12 weeks	No limit	12 weeks	12 weeks	12 weeks
Sinaloa	No limit	No limit	No limit	No limit	13 weeks	13 weeks
Sonora	No limit	Prohibited	No limit	Prohibited	Prohibited	Prohibited
Tabasco	No limit	12 weeks	No limit	12 weeks	12 weeks	12 weeks
Tamaulipas	No limit	No limit	No limit	Prohibited	Prohibited	Prohibited
Tlaxcala	No limit	No limit	No limit	No limit	Permitted (Note: This ground is not explicitly mentioned in the law but it is established by judicial decision.)	Permitted
Veracruz	No limit	No limit	No limit	No limit	12 weeks	12 weeks
Yucatán	No limit	12 weeks	No limit	No limit	No limit	12 weeks
Zacatecas	No limit	No limit	No limit	No limit	12 weeks	12 weeks
Micronesia	Permitted	Prohibited	Prohibited	Prohibited	Prohibited	Prohibited
Moldova	21 weeks	21 weeks	21 weeks	21 weeks	21 weeks	12 weeks (Note: If the woman is under age 15 or over age 40, the gestational limit is 21 weeks.)
Monaco	No limit	No limit	12 weeks	No limit	Prohibited	Prohibited
Mongolia	23 weeks	23 weeks	Permitted	Permitted	14 weeks	14 weeks
Montenegro	32 weeks	32 weeks	20 weeks	20 weeks	10 weeks	10 weeks
Morocco (Note: In 2016, the government of Morocco proposed allowing abortion in cases of rape, incest, mental disability and fetal impairment. However, the parliament did not approve the proposal, and as of 2021 the abortion articles in the penal code remain unchanged.)	No limit	Permitted	Prohibited	Prohibited	Prohibited	Prohibited
Mozambique	No limit	No limit	16 weeks	24 weeks (Note: May be permitted with no gestational limit in case the fetus is not viable.)	12 weeks	12 weeks
Myanmar	No limit	Prohibited	Prohibited	Prohibited	Prohibited	Prohibited
Namibia	Permitted	Permitted	Permitted	Permitted	Prohibited	Prohibited
Nauru	No limit	No limit	20 weeks	20 weeks	Prohibited	Prohibited
Nepal	28 weeks	28 weeks	18 weeks	28 weeks	12 weeks (Note: Up to 28 weeks if the woman has HIV or a similar incurable disease.)	12 weeks
Netherlands (Note: Including the Caribbean Netherlands.)	No limit	No limit	24 weeks	No limit	24 weeks	24 weeks
New Zealand	No limit	No limit	Permitted	Permitted	Permitted	20 weeks
Nicaragua	Prohibited	Prohibited	Prohibited	Prohibited	Prohibited	Prohibited
Niger	Permitted	Permitted	Prohibited	Permitted	Prohibited	Prohibited
Nigeria [subdivisions]	Permitted	Prohibited (Note: The Criminal Code of the predecessor of Nigeria prohibited abortion except to save the woman's life. A judicial decision on a similar law in the parent country allowed abortion also to preserve the woman's health, but the West African Court of Appeal, despite applying the reasoning of the parent country's decision, affirmed only the ground to save the woman's life in Nigerian law. The Criminal Code and its judicial precedent remain in force in the southern states of Nigeria. In the states corresponding to the former Northern Region, the Penal Code replaced the Criminal Code and its judicial precedent, and it also prohibits abortion except to save the woman's life.)	Prohibited	Prohibited	Prohibited	Prohibited
Abia	Permitted	Prohibited	Prohibited	Prohibited	Prohibited	Prohibited
Adamawa	Permitted	Prohibited	Prohibited	Prohibited	Prohibited	Prohibited
Akwa Ibom	Permitted	Prohibited	Prohibited	Prohibited	Prohibited	Prohibited
Anambra	Permitted	Prohibited	Prohibited	Prohibited	Prohibited	Prohibited
Bauchi	Permitted	Prohibited	Prohibited	Prohibited	Prohibited	Prohibited
Bayelsa	Permitted	Prohibited	Prohibited	Prohibited	Prohibited	Prohibited
Benue	Permitted	Prohibited	Prohibited	Prohibited	Prohibited	Prohibited
Borno	Permitted	Prohibited	Prohibited	Prohibited	Prohibited	Prohibited
Cross River	Permitted	Prohibited	Prohibited	Prohibited	Prohibited	Prohibited
Delta	Permitted	Prohibited	Prohibited	Prohibited	Prohibited	Prohibited
Ebonyi	Permitted	Prohibited	Prohibited	Prohibited	Prohibited	Prohibited
Edo	Permitted	Prohibited	Prohibited	Prohibited	Prohibited	Prohibited
Ekiti	Permitted	Prohibited	Prohibited	Prohibited	Prohibited	Prohibited
Enugu	Permitted	Prohibited	Prohibited	Prohibited	Prohibited	Prohibited
Federal Capital Territory	Permitted	Prohibited	Prohibited	Prohibited	Prohibited	Prohibited
Gombe	Permitted	Prohibited	Prohibited	Prohibited	Prohibited	Prohibited
Imo	Permitted	Prohibited	Prohibited	Prohibited	Prohibited	Prohibited
Jigawa	Permitted	Prohibited	Prohibited	Prohibited	Prohibited	Prohibited
Kaduna	Permitted	Prohibited	Prohibited	Prohibited	Prohibited	Prohibited
Kano	Permitted	Prohibited	Prohibited	Prohibited	Prohibited	Prohibited
Katsina	Permitted	Prohibited	Prohibited	Prohibited	Prohibited	Prohibited
Kebbi	Permitted	Prohibited	Prohibited	Prohibited	Prohibited	Prohibited
Kogi	Permitted	Prohibited	Prohibited	Prohibited	Prohibited	Prohibited
Kwara	Permitted	Prohibited	Prohibited	Prohibited	Prohibited	Prohibited
Lagos	Permitted	Prohibited	Prohibited	Prohibited	Prohibited	Prohibited
Nasarawa	Permitted	Prohibited	Prohibited	Prohibited	Prohibited	Prohibited
Niger	Permitted	Prohibited	Prohibited	Prohibited	Prohibited	Prohibited
Ogun	Permitted	Prohibited	Prohibited	Prohibited	Prohibited	Prohibited
Ondo	Permitted	Prohibited	Prohibited	Prohibited	Prohibited	Prohibited
Osun	Permitted	Prohibited	Prohibited	Prohibited	Prohibited	Prohibited
Oyo	Permitted	Prohibited	Prohibited	Prohibited	Prohibited	Prohibited
Plateau	Permitted	Prohibited	Prohibited	Prohibited	Prohibited	Prohibited
Rivers	Permitted	Prohibited	Prohibited	Prohibited	Prohibited	Prohibited
Sokoto	Permitted	Prohibited	Prohibited	Prohibited	Prohibited	Prohibited
Taraba	Permitted	Prohibited	Prohibited	Prohibited	Prohibited	Prohibited
Yobe	Permitted	Prohibited	Prohibited	Prohibited	Prohibited	Prohibited
Zamfara	Permitted	Prohibited	Prohibited	Prohibited	Prohibited	Prohibited
Northern Cyprus	Permitted	Permitted	Permitted	Permitted	Permitted	10 weeks
North Korea	Permitted (Note: The criminal law of North Korea, as amended up to 2015, does not mention abortion. In 2015 the North Korean government issued a directive prohibiting medical professionals from performing abortions but did not indicate a penalty for doing so. In 2016, the government stated that abortion was "legal" and "provided upon request by the woman concerned for reasons of risks to her life, physical and mental health and fetal malformation", but it is unclear whether these were the only permitted reasons. It has also been reported that repatriated pregnant women are forced to have abortions to prevent children of mixed ethnicity.)	Permitted	Unclear	Permitted	Unclear	Unclear
North Macedonia	No limit	No limit	22 weeks (Note: May be permitted with no gestational limit in some cases.)	22 weeks	22 weeks	12 weeks
Norway	No limit	No limit	22 weeks	22 weeks (Note: No limit if it is clear that the fetus will die during pregnancy or shortly after birth.)	22 weeks	18 weeks
Oman	Permitted (Note: The penal law prohibits abortion without any explicit exception, but it exempts from penal liability actions done by necessity to protect oneself or others from a severe and imminent danger, and in the practice of agreed medical activities or urgent medical intervention. The law regulating medical practice prohibits abortion except for risk to the woman's life or of unbearable illness, and in case of fetal impairment up to 120 days of gestation.)	Permitted	Prohibited	120 days	Prohibited	Prohibited
Pakistan	No limit	Organ formation (Note: Different sources specify this limit as 120 days or four months of gestation.)	Prohibited	Prohibited	Prohibited	Prohibited
Palau	Permitted (Note: This ground is not explicitly mentioned in the law but it is accepted as a general legal principle.)	Prohibited	Prohibited	Prohibited	Prohibited	Prohibited
Palestine	Permitted (Note: The law prohibits abortion except to save the woman's life. However, some sources say that abortion may also be permitted for health reasons and in cases of rape and fetal impairment, while other sources say that it is not possible to obtain an abortion in any circumstance.)	Prohibited	Prohibited	Prohibited	Prohibited	Prohibited
Panama	No limit	Prohibited	2 months	24 weeks	Prohibited	Prohibited
Papua New Guinea	Permitted	Prohibited (Note: The law prohibits abortion done "unlawfully" without defining it, and it explicitly permits abortion to preserve the woman's life. An opinion of the State Solicitor in 1982, based on court decisions on identical laws in the former parent country, considered that preservation of the woman's health was also a legal ground for abortion. However, in 2018, in the case of a woman who had aborted at four months of pregnancy due to risk to health, the Supreme Court acquitted her because she had been wrongly charged for the crime of killing an unborn child, which only applies shortly before birth (section 312), but ruled that she should have still been charged for the crime of abortion (section 225).)	Prohibited	Prohibited	Prohibited	Prohibited
Paraguay	Permitted	Prohibited	Prohibited	Prohibited	Prohibited	Prohibited
Peru	22 weeks	22 weeks	Prohibited	Prohibited	Prohibited	Prohibited
Philippines	Prohibited (Note: The law prohibits abortion without explicitly mentioning any exception, but in 2014 the Supreme Court ruled that indirect abortion done to save the woman's life was permitted under the principle of double effect.)	Prohibited	Prohibited	Prohibited	Prohibited	Prohibited
Poland	No limit	No limit	13 weeks	Prohibited (Note: This ground was mentioned in the law but it was invalidated by a judicial decision in 2020.)	Prohibited (Note: This ground was mentioned in the law but it was invalidated by a judicial decision in 1997.)	Prohibited
Portugal	No limit	No limit	16 weeks	24 weeks	10 weeks	10 weeks
Qatar	No limit	4 months	Prohibited	4 months	Prohibited	Prohibited
Romania	No limit	Permitted	Permitted	Permitted	Permitted	14 weeks
Russia	Permitted	Permitted	22 weeks	No limit	12 weeks	12 weeks
Rwanda	No limit	No limit	22 weeks	No limit	Prohibited	Prohibited
Saint Kitts and Nevis	Permitted	Permitted (Note: This ground is not explicitly mentioned in the law but it is established by judicial decision.)	Prohibited	Prohibited	Prohibited	Prohibited
Saint Lucia	No limit	No limit	12 weeks	Prohibited	Prohibited	Prohibited
Saint Vincent and the Grenadines	Permitted	Permitted	Permitted	Permitted	Permitted	Prohibited
Samoa	20 weeks	20 weeks	Prohibited	Prohibited	Prohibited	Prohibited
San Marino	Viability (Note: In case of risk to the woman's life after fetal viability, the pregnancy may also be interrupted by attempting a live birth.)	Viability	Viability	12 weeks (Note: Permitted until fetal viability in case of a fetal anomaly that poses a risk to the woman's health.)	12 weeks	12 weeks
São Tomé and Príncipe	No limit	No limit	No limit	16 weeks	12 weeks	12 weeks
Saudi Arabia	No limit	4 months	40 days (Note: Abortion may also permitted up to 40 days of gestation for other reasons that are not economic or social concerns.)	40 days	Prohibited	Prohibited
Senegal	Permitted (Note: The penal code prohibits abortion without any explicit exception, but the code of medical ethics permits abortion to save the woman's life. The government has stated that abortion is authorized in case of risk to the woman's health.)	Prohibited	Prohibited	Prohibited	Prohibited	Prohibited
Serbia	No limit	No limit	No limit	No limit	10 weeks	10 weeks
Seychelles	12 weeks (Note: In some cases, abortion may be allowed up to fetal viability or 26 weeks of gestation.)	12 weeks	12 weeks	12 weeks	Prohibited	Prohibited
Sierra Leone	Permitted (Note: Sierra Leone established that the laws in force in England in 1880 would be in force in Sierra Leone from 1965. One of these laws prohibited abortion done "unlawfully" without defining it. A judicial decision in England in 1938 clarified that this law always implicitly allowed abortion at least to save the woman's life, and the decision allowed it also to preserve her health. It is unclear whether Sierra Leone applies only the original legal principle or also the judicial decision. In 2015 the parliament of Sierra Leone passed a law allowing abortion on request but it was not signed by the president so it did not come into force.)	Permitted	Prohibited	Prohibited	Prohibited	Prohibited
Singapore	No limit	No limit	24 weeks	24 weeks	24 weeks	24 weeks
Slovakia	No limit	Permitted (Note: In some cases, the gestational limit is 12 weeks.)	12 weeks	No limit	12 weeks	12 weeks
Slovenia	No limit	No limit	10 weeks	10 weeks	10 weeks	10 weeks
Solomon Islands	Permitted	Prohibited	Prohibited	Prohibited	Prohibited	Prohibited
Somalia (Note: Including Somaliland.)	Permitted (Note: This ground is not explicitly mentioned in the law but it is accepted as a general legal principle.)	Prohibited	Prohibited	Prohibited	Prohibited	Prohibited
South Africa	No limit	20 weeks	20 weeks	No limit	20 weeks	12 weeks
South Korea (Note: The laws of South Korea prohibited abortion except for risk to the woman's health, rape, incest, or certain medical conditions, up to 24 weeks of gestation. On 11 April 2019, the Constitutional Court ruled that the abortion restrictions were unconstitutional, giving the legislature until the end of 2020 to amend the laws to allow abortion on request with some gestational limit. In October 2020 the government proposed a limit of 14 weeks for abortion on request and 24 weeks for certain other cases, but the legislature did not approve this or any other proposal on the subject before the end of the year, so the abortion laws became automatically invalid on 1 January 2021. As of 2025, the legislature had still not approved any of the proposals, leaving abortion decriminalized without a clear gestational limit.)	Permitted	Permitted	Permitted	Permitted	Permitted (Note: This ground is not explicitly mentioned in the law but it is established by judicial decision.)	Permitted
South Ossetia	Permitted	Permitted	Permitted	Permitted	22 weeks	12 weeks
South Sudan	Permitted	Prohibited	Prohibited	Prohibited	Prohibited	Prohibited
Spain	22 weeks	22 weeks	14 weeks	22 weeks (Note: In case of a fatal anomaly, no limit is specified.)	14 weeks	14 weeks
Sri Lanka	Permitted	Prohibited	Prohibited	Prohibited	Prohibited	Prohibited
Sudan	No limit	Prohibited	90 days (Note: From conception.)	Prohibited	Prohibited	Prohibited
Suriname	Permitted (Note: This ground is not explicitly mentioned in the law but it is accepted as a general legal principle.)	Prohibited	Prohibited	Prohibited	Prohibited	Prohibited
Sweden	No limit	No limit	18 weeks	18 weeks	18 weeks	18 weeks
Switzerland	No limit	No limit	12 weeks	12 weeks	12 weeks	12 weeks
Syria	Permitted	Prohibited	Prohibited	Prohibited	Prohibited	Prohibited
Taiwan	No limit	No limit	24 weeks	No limit	24 weeks	Prohibited
Tajikistan	Permitted	22 weeks	22 weeks	22 weeks	22 weeks	12 weeks
Tanzania (Note: In mainland Tanzania, articles 150 to 152 of the penal code prohibit abortion done "unlawfully", and article 230 of the same law permits abortion to preserve the woman's life. Article 219 additionally prohibits "child destruction", meaning abortion after fetal viability, presumed at 28 weeks of pregnancy, but still permits it to preserve the woman's life. In Zanzibar, the penal act has equivalent articles 129 to 131, 213 and 200.)	No limit	Permitted (Note: This ground is not explicitly mentioned in the law. A judicial decision by the East African Court of Appeal, with jurisdiction over the predecessors of Tanzania, allowed abortion also to preserve the woman's health, and sources state that this decision remains binding after independence.)	Prohibited	Prohibited	Prohibited	Prohibited
Thailand	No limit	No limit	No limit	No limit	20 weeks	20 weeks
Togo	Permitted	Permitted	Permitted	Permitted	Prohibited	Prohibited
Tonga	Permitted (Note: This ground is not explicitly mentioned in the law but it is accepted as a general legal principle.)	Prohibited	Prohibited	Prohibited	Prohibited	Prohibited
Transnistria	No limit	No limit	22 weeks	No limit	22 weeks	12 weeks
Trinidad and Tobago	Permitted (Note: This ground is not explicitly mentioned in the law but it is accepted as a general legal principle and established by judicial decision.)	Permitted	Prohibited	Prohibited	Prohibited	Prohibited
Tunisia	No limit	No limit	3 months	No limit	3 months	3 months
Turkey	No limit	10 weeks	20 weeks	No limit	10 weeks	10 weeks
Turkmenistan	No limit	No limit	Permitted	Permitted	22 weeks	5 weeks
Tuvalu	Permitted	Prohibited	Prohibited	Prohibited	Prohibited	Prohibited
Uganda	28 weeks	28 weeks	28 weeks	28 weeks	Prohibited	Prohibited
Ukraine	22 weeks	22 weeks	22 weeks	22 weeks	12 weeks (Note: If the woman is under age 15 or over age 45, the gestational limit is 22 weeks.)	12 weeks
United Arab Emirates	No limit	120 days (Note: A Cabinet resolution on abortion, issued under the law on medical liability, permits abortion "based on the request of the spouses, after the approval of the committee", "and with the approval of the treating physician for the medical condition justifying the abortion", in the first 120 days of pregnancy. These provisions are considered to permit abortion in case of risk to the woman's physical or mental health, and may also include other cases.)	120 days	No limit	Prohibited	Prohibited
United Kingdom [subdivisions]	No limit	No limit	Permitted (Note: This ground is not explicitly mentioned in the law but it is considered to be included in a ground for preserving physical or mental health.)	No limit	24 weeks	Varies (Note: Abortion for this ground is permitted only in Northern Ireland, up to 12 weeks of gestation.)
England	No limit	No limit	Permitted	No limit	24 weeks	Prohibited
Northern Ireland	No limit	No limit	Permitted	No limit	24 weeks	12 weeks
Scotland	No limit	No limit	Permitted	No limit	24 weeks	Prohibited
Wales	No limit	No limit	Permitted	No limit	24 weeks	Prohibited
United States [subdivisions]	No limit	Varies (Note: Abortion for this ground is not permitted in some states.)	Varies	Varies	Varies	Varies
Alabama	No limit	No limit	Prohibited	Prohibited (Note: Permitted in case of a lethal anomaly up to 20 weeks from fertilization, considered as 22 weeks from the last menstrual period.)	Prohibited	Prohibited
Alaska	No limit	No limit	No limit	No limit	No limit	No limit
Arizona (Note: This U.S. state has explicitly amended its constitution to guarantee the right to an abortion to its residents.)	No limit	No limit	Viability (Note: The law sets a gestational limit of 15 weeks for abortion on this ground, but the constitution invalidates its enforcement before fetal viability.)	Viability	Viability	Viability
Arkansas	No limit	Prohibited	Prohibited	Prohibited	Prohibited	Prohibited
California	No limit	No limit	Viability	Viability	Viability	Viability
Colorado	No limit	No limit	No limit	No limit	No limit	No limit
Connecticut	No limit	No limit	Viability	Viability	Viability	Viability
Delaware	No limit	No limit	Viability	No limit	Viability	Viability
District of Columbia	No limit	No limit	No limit	No limit	No limit	No limit
Florida	No limit	No limit	15 weeks	6 weeks (Note: Permitted in the first 23 weeks of gestation if the fetus has a fatal abnormality.)	6 weeks	6 weeks
Georgia	No limit	No limit	22 weeks (Note: Defined as 20 weeks from fertilization, considered as 22 weeks from the last menstrual period.)	No limit	Heartbeat (Note: Prohibited after embryonic or fetal cardiac activity is detected, which is possible after approximately 6 weeks of gestation.)	Heartbeat
Hawaii	No limit	No limit	Viability	Viability	Viability	Viability
Idaho	No limit	No limit (Note: This ground is not mentioned in the state law but it is established by judicial decision based on federal law.)	15 weeks (Note: Defined as 13 weeks from fertilization, considered as 15 weeks from the last menstrual period.)	Prohibited	Prohibited	Prohibited
Illinois	No limit	No limit	Viability	Viability	Viability	Viability
Indiana	No limit	No limit	12 weeks (Note: Defined as 10 weeks from fertilization, considered as 12 weeks from the last menstrual period.)	Prohibited (Note: Permitted in case of a lethal anomaly up to 20 weeks from fertilization, considered as 22 weeks from the last menstrual period.)	Prohibited	Prohibited
Iowa	No limit	No limit	22 weeks	Heartbeat (Note: Permitted in case of a fetal abnormality incompatible with life up to 20 weeks from fertilization, considered as 22 weeks from the last menstrual period.)	Heartbeat	Heartbeat
Kansas	No limit	No limit	22 weeks	22 weeks	22 weeks	22 weeks
Kentucky	No limit	No limit	Prohibited	Prohibited	Prohibited	Prohibited
Louisiana	No limit	No limit	Prohibited	Prohibited (Note: Permitted in certain cases of fatal anomalies.)	Prohibited	Prohibited
Maine	No limit	No limit	Viability (Note: Abortion after viability is allowed if a physician judges it "necessary" under the "applicable standard of care".)	Viability	Viability	Viability
Maryland	No limit	No limit	Viability (Note: Criminal law prohibits abortion after fetal viability except as stated in health law, and health law states that "the State may not interfere" with abortion on this ground before viability. Sources disagree whether it is actually prohibited after viability.)	No limit	Viability	Viability
Massachusetts	No limit	No limit	24 weeks	No limit	24 weeks	24 weeks
Michigan	No limit	No limit	No limit	No limit	No limit	No limit
Minnesota	No limit	No limit	No limit	No limit	No limit	No limit
Mississippi	No limit	Prohibited	20 weeks	Prohibited	Prohibited	Prohibited
Missouri	No limit	No limit	viability (Note: The law prohibits abortion on this ground, but the constitution invalidates its enforcement before fetal viability.)	viability	viability	viability
Montana	No limit	No limit	Viability	Viability	Viability	Viability
Nebraska	No limit	No limit	22 weeks	12 weeks	12 weeks	12 weeks
Nevada	No limit	No limit	24 weeks	24 weeks	24 weeks	24 weeks
New Hampshire	No limit	No limit	24 weeks	No limit	24 weeks	24 weeks
New Jersey	No limit	No limit	No limit	No limit	No limit	No limit
New Mexico	No limit	No limit	No limit	No limit	No limit	No limit
New York	No limit	No limit	24 weeks (Note: Also allowed after this period if there is an absence of fetal viability.)	24 weeks	24 weeks	24 weeks
North Carolina	No limit	No limit	20 weeks	12 weeks (Note: Permitted up to 24 weeks of gestation in case of a life-limiting anomaly.)	12 weeks	12 weeks
North Dakota	No limit	No limit	6 weeks	Prohibited	Prohibited	Prohibited
Ohio	No limit	No limit	Viability (Note: The law prohibits abortion on this ground after embryonic or fetal cardiac activity is detected, which is possible after approximately 6 weeks of gestation, but the constitution invalidates its enforcement before fetal viability.)	Viability	Viability	Viability
Oklahoma	No limit	Prohibited	Prohibited	Prohibited	Prohibited	Prohibited
Oregon	No limit	No limit	No limit	No limit	No limit	No limit
Pennsylvania	No limit	No limit	24 weeks	24 weeks	24 weeks	24 weeks
Rhode Island	No limit	No limit	Viability	Viability	Viability	Viability
South Carolina	No limit	No limit	12 weeks	No limit	Heartbeat	Heartbeat
South Dakota	No limit	Prohibited	Prohibited	Prohibited	Prohibited	Prohibited
Tennessee	No limit	No limit	Prohibited	Prohibited	Prohibited	Prohibited
Texas	No limit	Prohibited	Prohibited	Prohibited	Prohibited	Prohibited
Utah	No limit	No limit	No limit	18 weeks (Note: In case of a lethal anomaly or a severe brain abnormality, no limit is specified.) (Note: A law prohibits abortion on this ground or sets a lower gestational limit but it is suspended by judicial decision.)	18 weeks	18 weeks
Vermont	No limit	No limit	No limit	No limit	No limit	No limit
Virginia	No limit	No limit	6 months	6 months	6 months	6 months
Washington	No limit	No limit	Viability	Viability	Viability	Viability
West Virginia	No limit	No limit	11 weeks (Note: Defined as 8 weeks from implantation, approximately 11 weeks from the last menstrual period. If the patient is a minor or an incompetent or incapacitated adult, abortion in case of rape is permitted in the first 14 weeks from implantation, approximately 17 weeks from the last menstrual period.)	Prohibited (Note: Permitted with no gestational limit if the fetus has a lethal anomaly.)	Prohibited	Prohibited
Wisconsin	No limit	No limit	22 weeks	22 weeks	22 weeks	22 weeks
Wyoming	No limit	No limit	Viability	Viability	viability	viability
Uruguay	No limit	No limit	14 weeks (Note: A judge may also remove the penalty for abortion on this ground in the first 3 months from conception.)	No limit	12 weeks	12 weeks
Uzbekistan	Permitted	22 weeks	22 weeks	22 weeks	22 weeks	12 weeks
Vanuatu	Permitted	Permitted (Note: The penal code says that abortion is permitted for "good medical reasons" but is unclear whether it means only to save the woman's life or also to preserve her health. The UN source marks it as a permitted ground.)	Prohibited	Prohibited	Prohibited	Prohibited
Vatican City	Prohibited (Note: The law of Vatican City is primarily based on the canon law of the Catholic Church and applies the Italian penal code in force in 1929 with local modifications. Both sources of law prohibit abortion without explicitly mentioning any exception. Article 49 of the penal code lists the principle of necessity to save one's life, which removes punishment for any action that would otherwise be a crime, but the Church's official interpretation of canon 1398 is more restrictive, allowing in such cases only indirect abortion under the principle of double effect.)	Prohibited	Prohibited	Prohibited	Prohibited	Prohibited
Venezuela	22 weeks	Prohibited	Prohibited	Prohibited	Prohibited	Prohibited
Vietnam	Permitted	Permitted	Permitted	Permitted	Permitted	22 weeks (Note: Depending on the capacity at each level of hospital.)
Yemen	Permitted	Prohibited	Prohibited	Prohibited	Prohibited	Prohibited
Zambia	Permitted	Permitted	Permitted	Permitted	Permitted	Prohibited
Zimbabwe	22 weeks	22 weeks	22 weeks (Note: The law prohibits abortion in case of rape within marriage or under age 18, but it is invalidated by judicial decision.)	22 weeks	Prohibited (Note: The 2014 Guidelines for Comprehensive Abortion Care says "In Zimbabwe termination of pregnancy may be permitted for HIV-positive women if they choose to do so.")	Prohibited

==== Autonomous jurisdictions ====
The table below summarizes the legal grounds for abortion in autonomous jurisdictions not included in the previous table.

Legal grounds on which abortion is permitted in other autonomous jurisdictions
Jurisdiction	Risk to life	Risk to health	Rape	Fetal impairment	Economic or social	On request
Akrotiri and Dhekelia	Permitted	Permitted	Permitted (Note: This ground is not explicitly mentioned in the law, but the identical text in the law of the parent country is considered to include this ground in a ground for preserving physical or mental health.)	Permitted	Permitted	Prohibited
American Samoa	Permitted	Permitted	Prohibited	Prohibited	Prohibited	Prohibited
Anguilla	No limit	28 weeks	Prohibited	28 weeks	Prohibited	Prohibited
Aruba	Permitted (Note: This ground is not explicitly mentioned in the law but it is accepted as a general legal principle.)	Prohibited	Prohibited	Prohibited	Prohibited	Prohibited
Bermuda	Permitted	Permitted	Permitted	Permitted	Prohibited	Prohibited
British Virgin Islands	No limit	28 weeks	Prohibited	28 weeks	Prohibited	Prohibited
Cayman Islands	Permitted	Prohibited	Prohibited	Prohibited	Prohibited	Prohibited
Cook Islands (Note: The parliament has proposed a law allowing abortion also in case of risk to health, rape and fetal impairment, but it has not yet been approved.)	Permitted	Permitted (Note: This ground is not explicitly mentioned in the law, but it is established by a judicial decision in the parent country. A UN source states this it in unclear whether this judicial precedent also applies to the Cook Islands, but it lists this ground as permitted there.)	Prohibited	Prohibited	Prohibited	Prohibited
Curaçao	Permitted	Prohibited (Note: Although illegal, the government does not prosecute abortions performed under rules similar to other countries, including on request.)	Prohibited	Prohibited	Prohibited	Prohibited
Falkland Islands	No limit	No limit	Permitted	No limit	24 weeks	Prohibited
Faroe Islands	No limit	No limit	Viability	No limit	Viability	12 weeks
Gibraltar	No limit	No limit	12 weeks (Note: This ground is not explicitly mentioned in the law but it is considered to be included in the ground for preserving physical or mental health.)	No limit	Prohibited	Prohibited
Greenland	No limit	No limit	No limit	No limit	No limit	12 weeks
Guam	No limit	No limit (Note: Although the law permits abortions on request, no medical providers in the territory perform them except to save the woman's life.)	26 weeks	26 weeks	13 weeks	13 weeks
Guernsey [subdivisions]	Permitted (Note: In Alderney and Sark, this ground is not explicitly mentioned in the law. A judicial decision on an identical law in the parent country clarified that the law always implicitly allowed abortion at least to save the woman's life, and the decision allowed it also to preserve her health. It is unclear whether Alderney and Sark apply only the original legal principle or also the judicial decision.)	Permitted	Varies (Note: Abortion for this ground is permitted in the jurisdiction of Guernsey, but not in Alderney or Sark.)	Varies	Varies	Prohibited
Alderney (Note: Although not allowed by Alderney law, abortions are provided in Alderney under the same conditions as in Guernsey, as health services in Alderney operate under Guernsey law. To resolve the legal contradiction, in 2022 the States of Alderney passed an abortion law identical to the one in Guernsey, and it awaits a regulation to establish the effective date.)	Permitted	Permitted	Prohibited	Prohibited	Prohibited	Prohibited
Guernsey	No limit	No limit	Permitted	No limit	24 weeks	Prohibited
Sark	Permitted	Permitted	Prohibited	Prohibited	Prohibited	Prohibited
Isle of Man	No limit	No limit	23 weeks	No limit	23 weeks	14 weeks
Jersey	No limit	No limit	12 weeks	24 weeks	12 weeks	12 weeks
Montserrat	No limit	viability	Prohibited	viability	Prohibited	Prohibited
Niue	Permitted (Note: A law enacted by New Zealand for Niue in 1966 prohibited abortion done "unlawfully", without defining it, but a judicial decision applicable in New Zealand allowed abortion in case of risk to the woman's life or health, and a UN source states this judicial precedent probably applies to Niue as well. In 2007, New Zealand repealed the sections of law that prohibited abortion in Niue, but they remain in force in Niue as legislation enacted by New Zealand after 1974 does not apply to Niue without its consent.)	Permitted	Prohibited	Prohibited	Prohibited	Prohibited
Northern Mariana Islands	Prohibited (Note: The territory's constitution prohibits abortion "except as provided by law", and the territory has no law about the subject. A law from the predecessor of the territory prohibited abortion done "unlawfully" without defining it, and although predecessor laws remain in force in the territory unless modified, a judicial decision ruled this abortion law invalid for being too vague. As a result, although abortion remains prohibited in principle by the constitution, abortion providers cannot be prosecuted for it as there is no law specifying a penalty. Still, in practice, authorized medical providers in the territory perform abortions only to save the woman's life and possibly in case of rape. In 1995, an opinion issued by the territory's attorney general concluded that U.S. judicial decisions allowing abortion on request also applied to the territory, but these decisions were overturned in 2022.)	Prohibited	Prohibited	Prohibited	Prohibited	Prohibited
Pitcairn Islands (Note: Applies English law in force in 2010 unless locally modified.)	No limit	No limit	Permitted	No limit	24 weeks	Prohibited
Puerto Rico	No limit	No limit	No limit (Note: The penal code prohibits abortion except in case of risk to the woman's life or health. In 1980, a decision by the Supreme Court of Puerto Rico expanded the health criteria to also include mental health, including emotional, psychological, family and age aspects, with no gestational limit. However, the decision still maintained the prohibition on abortion if done without any therapeutic consideration.)	No limit	No limit	Prohibited
Saint Helena, Ascension and Tristan da Cunha (Note: Applies English law in force on 1 January 2006 unless locally modified, in each part of the territory. Tristan da Cunha explicitly applies the abortion law of the United Kingdom with minor modifications.)	No limit	No limit	Permitted	No limit	24 weeks	Prohibited
Sint Maarten	Permitted	Prohibited (Note: Although illegal, the government does not prosecute abortions performed under rules similar to other countries, including on request.)	Prohibited	Prohibited	Prohibited	Prohibited
Tokelau	Permitted (Note: This ground is not explicitly mentioned in the law. The judicial handbook says that abortion is permitted for medical reasons but is unclear whether it means only to save the woman's life or also to preserve her health.)	Permitted	Prohibited	Prohibited	Prohibited	Prohibited
Turks and Caicos Islands	Permitted (Note: This ground is not explicitly mentioned in the law. A judicial decision on an identical law in the parent country clarified that the law always implicitly allowed abortion at least to save the woman's life, and the decision allowed it also to preserve her health. It is unclear whether the territory applies only the original legal principle or also the judicial decision.)	Permitted	Prohibited	Prohibited	Prohibited	Prohibited
United States Virgin Islands	No limit	No limit	24 weeks	24 weeks	24 weeks	24 weeks

=== Comparative limits for countries with elective abortions ===
Legal limits may not be directly comparable. Limits may be expressed in trimesters, months, weeks of pregnancy (implantation), weeks from fertilization, or weeks from last menstrual period (LMP).

Color-coded map illustrating the term limits of elective abortion in Europe (in weeks from last menstrual period, fertilization or implantation) Illegal Legal but generally unavailable (Northern Ireland) Legal first 5 weeks (Turkmenistan) Legal first 10 weeks Legal first 11 weeks (Estonia) Legal first 12 weeks Legal first 13 weeks (3 months, Austria, Tunisia) Legal first 14 weeks Legal first 18 weeks Legal first 22 weeks (Iceland) Legal first 24 weeks Technically illegal, but generally available through 12 weeks (Finland) Technically illegal, but generally available through 24 weeks (Great Britain) Technically 12 weeks, but generally available through 22 weeks (ex-USSR) Technically 12 weeks, but generally available through 28 weeks (ex-USSR) Legal if the pregnancy is not from marriage; generally available under exemptions (Israel)

Status of elective abortion in the United States Illegal, limited exceptions (Note: All states and territories, apart from the Northern Mariana Islands, allow abortion to prevent the woman's imminent death (with various definitions of "imminent"), and some for other reasons. Northern Mariana Islands allows exceptions per law, but no law has been passed. • Additional allowance for risk to the woman's physical health: Alabama, Arizona, Florida, Georgia, Indiana, Iowa, Kansas, Kentucky, Louisiana, Missouri, Montana, Nebraska, New Hampshire, North Carolina, North Dakota, Ohio, Pennsylvania, South Carolina, Tennessee, Utah, West Virginia, Wisconsin, and Wyoming. • Allowance for risk to the woman's general health: California, Connecticut, Delaware, Hawaii, Indiana, Illinois, Maine, Maryland, Massachusetts, Michigan, Minnesota, Nevada, New York, Rhode Island, Virginia, Washington. • Allowance for pregnancy due to rape or incest: Georgia, Idaho, Indiana, Iowa, Mississippi, North Dakota, South Carolina, West Virginia, Utah, and Wyoming. • Allowance for lethal fetal abnormality: Alabama, Delaware, Florida, Georgia, Indiana, Iowa, Louisiana, Maryland, Massachusetts, South Carolina, West Virginia, Wyoming, and Utah. Note that these allowances may have a time limit, which may be as early as cardiac-cell activity (approximately 6 weeks LMP); others may have no limit. Different allowances may have different limits in the same state.) Legal, but no providers Legal before cardiac-cell activity (Note: Cardiac-cell activity is generally detectable in the 6th week LMP. Allowance beyond this limit is made, at minimum, for an immediate threat to the woman's life. In general, states that permit limited elective abortion may allow abortion beyond that limit for some or all of the reasons listed above.) Legal through 12th week LMP* Legal through 18th week LMP* Legal through 22nd week LMP* (5 months) Legal before fetal viability (Note: Typically, fetal viability begins in the 23rd or 24th week LMP.) Legal through 24th week LMP* (5½ months) Legal through second trimester (Note: The second trimester is variously defined as through 27th or 28th week LMP.) Legal at any stage *LMP is the time elapsed since the last menstruation began. This color-coded map illustrates the current legal status of elective-specific abortion procedures in each of the individual states, U.S. territories, and federal district. State supreme courts and other high courts may mandate that abortions either are able or are not able to be performed, even if law allows or does not allow it. A colored border indicates a more stringent restriction or ban that is blocked by legal injunction.

Color-coded map illustrating availability of abortion in Canada, in weeks of embryonic age (from fertilization). Abortion is legal at all stages in Canada, but availability is subject to medical guidelines. Available first 12 weeks (PEI) Available first 13 weeks Available first 16 weeks Available first 19 weeks Available first 20 weeks Available first 24 weeks Available first 25 weeks

Colour-coded map illustrating accessibility of abortion in Australia, in weeks of embryonic age (from fertilization). Beyond the limits it is legal with two doctors' approval. Available first 16 weeks (4 months) Available first 22 weeks (5 months) Available first 23 weeks (5.5 months) Available first 24 weeks (5.5 months) Legal at any stage if provided by medical doctor.

=== Countries with more restrictive laws ===
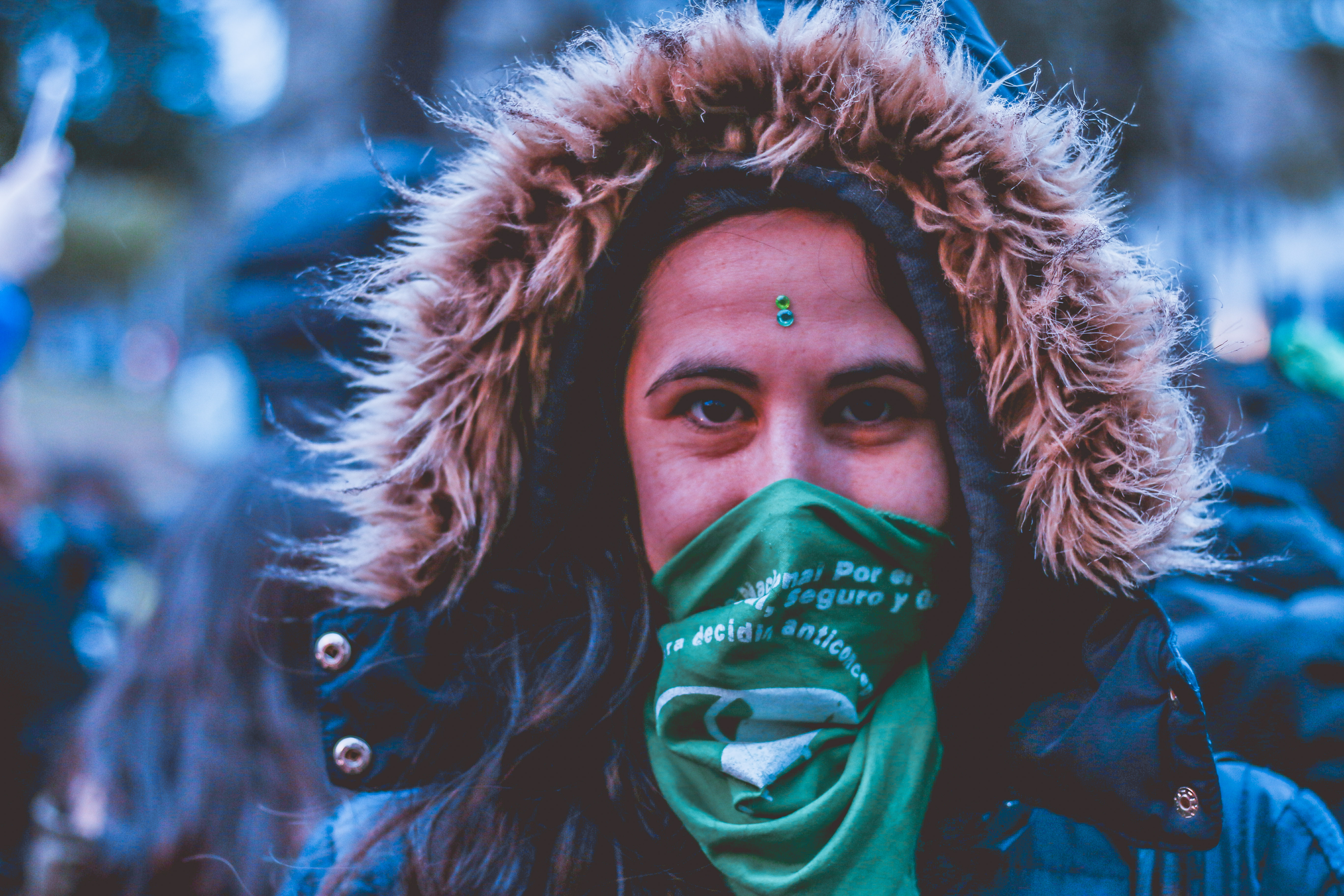
Supporter of legalized abortion at a rally in Paraná, Argentina. Argentina had restrictive laws until 2021.

According to a report by Women on Waves, approximately 25% of the world's population lives in countries with "highly restrictive abortion laws"—that is, laws which either completely ban abortion, or allow it only to save the mother's life. This category includes several countries in Latin America, Africa, Asia and Oceania, as well as Andorra and Malta in Europe. The Center for Reproductive Rights report that "[t]he inability to access safe and legal abortion care impacts 700 million women of reproductive age."

Some of the countries of Central America, notably El Salvador, have also come to international attention due to very forceful enforcement of the laws, including the incarceration of a gang-rape victim for homicide when she gave birth to a stillborn son and was accused of attempting an illegal abortion.

El Salvador has some of the strictest abortion laws of any country. Abortion under all circumstances, including rape, incest, and risk to the mother's health, is illegal. Women can be criminalized and penalized to up to 40 years in prison after being found guilty of an abortion. El Salvador's abortion laws are so severe that miscarriages and stillbirths can sometimes be enough for conviction. The Inter-American Court has already ruled that El Salvador was responsible for the death of Manuela, who was sentenced to 30 years in prison in 2008 for aggravated homicide after suffering an obstetric emergency that resulted in her losing her pregnancy.

=== Beginning of pregnancy controversy ===
Controversy over the beginning of pregnancy occurs in different contexts, particularly in a legal context, and is particularly discussed within the abortion debate from the point of measuring the gestational age of the pregnancy. Pregnancy can be measured from a number of convenient points, including the day of last menstruation, ovulation, fertilization, implantation and chemical detection. A common medical way to calculate gestational age is to measure pregnancy from the first day of the last menstrual cycle. (Note: Some examples of gestational age calculated from the first day of the last menstrual cycle:) However, not all legal systems use this measure for the purpose of abortion law; for example countries such as Belgium, France, and Luxembourg use the term "pregnancy" in the abortion law to refer to the time elapsed from the sexual act that led to conception, which is presumed to be 2 weeks after the end of the last menstrual period. (Note: For example Luxembourg abortion law states: "Avant la fin de la 12e semaine de grossesse ou avant la fin de la 14e semaine d'aménorrhée ...", which translates to "Before the end of the 12th week of pregnancy or before the end of the 14th week of amenorrhea".)

== Exceptions in abortion law ==
Exceptions in abortion laws occur either in countries where abortion is as a general rule illegal or in countries that have abortion on request with gestational limits. For example, if a country allows abortion on request until 12 weeks, it may create exceptions to this general gestation limit for later abortions in specific circumstances.

There are a few exceptions commonly found in abortion laws. Legal domains which do not have abortion on demand will often allow it when the health of the mother is at stake. "Health of the mother" may mean something different in different areas: for example, prior to December 2018, Ireland allowed abortion only to save the mother's life, whereas abortion opponents in the United States argue health exceptions are used so broadly as to render a ban essentially meaningless.

Laws allowing abortion in cases of rape or incest often differ. For example, before Roe v. Wade, thirteen U.S. states allowed abortion in the case of either rape or incest, but only Mississippi permitted abortion of pregnancies due to rape, and no state permitted it for just incest.

Many countries allow abortion only through the first or second trimester, and some may allow abortion in cases of fetal defects, e.g., Down syndrome, or where the pregnancy is the result of a sexual crime.

== Other related laws ==
Laws in some countries with liberal abortion laws protect access to abortion services. Such legislation often seeks to guard abortion clinics against obstruction, vandalism, picketing, and other actions, or to protect patients and employees of such facilities from threats and harassment. Other laws create a perimeter around a facility, known variously as a "buffer zone", "bubble zone", or "access zone", where demonstrations opposing abortion are not permitted. Protests and other displays are restricted to a certain distance from the building, which varies depending on the law. Similar zones have also been created to protect the homes of abortion providers and clinic staff. Bubble zone laws are divided into "fixed" and "floating" categories. Fixed bubble zone laws apply to the static area around the facility itself, and floating laws to objects in transit, such as people or cars. Because of conflicts between anti-abortion activists on one side and women seeking abortion and medical staff who provides abortion on the other side, some laws are quite strict: in South Africa for instance, any person who prevents the lawful termination of a pregnancy or obstructs access to a facility for the termination of a pregnancy faces up to 10 years in prison (section 10.1 (c) of the Choice on Termination of Pregnancy Act).

On 3 November 2020, an association of 20 Kenyan charities urged the government of Kenya to withdraw from the Geneva Consensus Declaration (GCD), a US-led international accord that sought to limit access to abortion for girls and women around the world. GCD was signed by 33 nations, on 22 October 2020.

== Judicial decisions ==
Year	Jurisdiction	Description	Abortion access affirmed or expanded?
1879	Canada	Abortion trial of Emily Stowe	
1938	United Kingdom	Rex v Bourne; Abortion in case of risk to physical or mental health included in risk to life. The decision was also implemented by some British territories and their successors.	Yes
1952	Canada	Azoulay v The Queen	
1969	Victoria (Australia)	R v Davidson (Note: Also known as the "Menhennitt ruling".); Abortion allowed in case of risk to life, and physical or mental health.	Yes
1971	United States	United States v. Vuitch	Restrictions upheld
1971	New South Wales (Australia)	R v Wald; Abortion in case of socioeconomic reasons included in risk to physical or mental health.	Yes
1973	United States	Doe v. Bolton; Abortion allowed after viability if necessary to protect her health.	Yes
1973	United States	Roe v. Wade; Abortion allowed on demand in the entire country.	Yes
1975	Germany	German Federal Constitutional Court abortion decision	Law restricted
1976	Canada	Morgentaler v The Queen	Restrictions upheld
1976	United States	Planned Parenthood v. Danforth	Legalization upheld
1979	United States	Maher v. Roe	
1979	United States	Colautti v. Franklin	
1980	Puerto Rico	Pueblo v. Duarte; Application of Roe v. Wade to Puerto Rico.	Yes
1980	United States	Harris v. McRae	
1981	United States	H. L. v. Matheson	Restrictions upheld
1981	Israel	A. v. B. Paternal consent not required.	Yes
1983	United States	City of Akron v. Akron Center for Reproductive Health	Yes
1986	United States	Thornburgh v. American College of Obstetricians and Gynecologists	
1988	Canada	R v Morgentaler	Yes
1989	Canada	Borowski v Canada (AG)	
1989	United States	Webster v. Reproductive Health Services	Restrictions upheld
1989	Canada	Tremblay v Daigle	Yes
1990	United States	Hodgson v. Minnesota	Yes
1991	United States	Rust v. Sullivan	
1992	Ireland	Attorney General v X Abortion allowed in case of risk to life, including risk of suicide.	Yes
1992	United States	Planned Parenthood v. Casey	Yes
1993	United States	Bray v. Alexandria Women's Health Clinic	
1993	Germany	2 BvF 2/90	
1993	Canada	R v Morgentaler	Yes
1995	New South Wales (Australia)	CES v. Superclinics; Physical or mental health should be considered not only during the pregnancy but also after the birth.	Yes
1997	Poland	K 26/96; Abortion for economic or social reasons ruled unconstitutional.	Law restricted
1997	United States	Thornburgh v. American College of Obstetricians and Gynecologists	
1998	South Africa	Christian Lawyers Association v Minister of Health; Law allowing abortion on demand ruled constitutional.	Legalization upheld
2000	United States	Hill v. Colorado	
2000	United States	Stenberg v. Carhart; Supreme Court struck down Nebraska's partial-birth abortion ban.	Yes
2001	Argentina	T., S. v. Government of Buenos Aires City	Yes
2003	United States	Scheidler v. National Organization for Women	
2006	United States	Ayotte v. Planned Parenthood of Northern New England	
2006	United States	Scheidler v. National Organization for Women	
2006	United States	Gonzales v. Carhart; Supreme Court upheld the Partial-Birth Abortion Ban Act of 2003.	Restrictions upheld
2006	Colombia	Constitutional Court allowed abortion in case of danger to woman's life or health, rape, and fetal deformation.	Yes
2006	Council of Europe	D v Ireland	
2006	New South Wales (Australia)	R v Sood	
2007	Council of Europe	Tysiąc v Poland	
2007	Slovakia	Constitutional Court ruled law allowing abortion on demand constitutional.	Legalization upheld
2008	Nepal	Achyut Kharel v. Government of Nepal	
2009	Council of Europe	A, B and C v Ireland; The court rejected the argument that article 8 conferred a right to abortion, but found that Ireland had violated the European Convention on Human Rights by failing to provide an accessible and effective procedure by which a woman can have established whether she qualifies for a legal abortion.	Yes
2009	Nepal	Lakshmi v. Government of Nepal; Supreme Court upheld and expanded legal abortion.	Yes
2011	United Kingdom	British Pregnancy Advisory Service v Secretary of State for Health	
2012	Argentina	F., A. L. Abortion allowed in case of rape of any woman, regardless of her mental health.	Yes
2012	Brazil	ADPF 54; Abortion allowed in case of anencephaly.	Yes
2012	Council of Europe	P. and S. v. Poland	
2013	El Salvador	Case of "Beatriz"	
2014	Bolivia	Ruling 0206/2014	
2014	Ireland	P.P. v. Health Service Executive	
2015	Dominican Republic	Constitutional Court ruled law allowing abortion in certain cases unconstitutional.	Law restricted
2015	Rwanda	RPA 0787/15/HC/KIG	
2016	United States	Whole Woman's Health v. Hellerstedt	Yes
2016	United Nations	Mellet v Ireland	
2017	Chile	Constitutional Court ruled law allowing abortion in certain cases constitutional.	Yes
2017	Croatia	Constitutional Court ruled law allowing abortion on demand constitutional.	Legalization upheld
2018	United Kingdom	Northern Ireland Human Rights Commission v Department of Justice	
2019	South Korea	Abortion allowed on request. Decision took effect in 2021.	Yes
2019	Australia	Clubb v Edwards	
2019	Kenya	FIDA-Kenya and Others v. Attorney General and Others; Abortion allowed in case of rape.	Yes
2020	Poland	K 1/20; Abortion in case of fetal deformity ruled unconstitutional. The decision was implemented on 27 January 2021.	Law restricted
2020	Thailand	Ruling No. 4/2563	
2020	Colombia	Constitutional Court ruled law allowing abortion in certain cases constitutional rejecting both total ban and legalization.	Law upheld
2021	Ecuador	Abortion allowed in case of rape of any woman, regardless of her mental health.	Yes
2021	Mexico	Gestational limit for abortion in case of rape ruled unconstitutional. Ruling only granted relief to plaintiff, did not automatically invalidate law.	Yes
2021	Mexico	Criminalization of abortion in early part of pregnancy ruled unconstitutional. Ruling only invalidated law of Coahuila.	Yes
2021	Mexico	Right to life from conception ruled unconstitutional. Ruling only invalidated article in constitution of Sinaloa.	Yes
2021	Mexico	Conscientious objection to abortion without guaranteeing rights of others ruled unconstitutional. Ruling invalidated articles of federal law.	Yes
2021	Inter-American Court of Human Rights	Manuela and Others v. El Salvador	
2021	United States	United States v. Texas	Restrictions upheld
2021	United States	Whole Woman's Health v. Jackson	Restrictions upheld
2022	Colombia	Constitutional Court decriminalized abortion up to 24 weeks of gestation.	Yes
2022	United States	Dobbs v. Jackson Women's Health Organization States may now ban or restrict abortion before viability, Roe v. Wade and Planned Parenthood v. Casey overturned.	Law restricted
2022	India	Abortion allowed under the same criteria regardless of marital status.	Yes
2023	Mexico	Criminalization of abortion in federal law ruled unconstitutional. Ruling only granted relief to plaintiff, did not automatically invalidate law.	Yes

== See also ==
- Category:Abortion by country
- Medical law
- Waiting period
