= S99 =

S99 may refer to:

- Avia S-99, a Czechoslovak fighter aircraft
- SAS Assegaai (S99), formerly SAS Joanna van der Merwe, a submarine of the South African Navy
- Sintura S99, a racing car
- Soviet submarine S-99, a submarine of the Soviet Navy
- S99, a refugee in Nauru
- S99, a line of the Lucerne S-Bahn
