= Abortion in Georgia =

Abortion in Georgia may refer to:

- Abortion in Georgia (country)
- Abortion in Georgia (U.S. state)
