= Planned Parenthood v. Alaska =

Planned Parenthood of the Great Northwest and the Hawaiian Islands (PPGNHI) filed a lawsuit on the State of Alaska over an abortion law on December 12, 2019. The law stipulates that only state board certified physicians can provide abortions. Planned Parenthood asserts that the law restricts women's access to gynecological care, such as miscarriage care and early medication abortions, by preventing advanced practice clinicians from providing services for which they are qualified. They assert that these clinicians have, for years, been safely providing these services in Hawaii and Washington where they are trained.
