= Abortion in Vietnam =

Abortion in Vietnam is legal until 22 weeks of pregnancy and provided free of charge by the state through Article 44 of the 1989 Public Health Protection Law. Vietnam also has one of the highest rates of abortion that has been surveyed in the world and its abortion laws are among the most liberal in Southeast Asia and the world.

== Legality of abortion in Vietnam ==
Abortion has been available on request in Vietnam since 1989. There are a number of laws that codify abortion rights in various ways. Due to its emphasis on family planning, abortion in Vietnam has been legalised without any restrictions on the reason for seeking the abortion. Family planning was made a national priority upon the unification of Vietnam, leading to the incentivization of contraception and abortion acceptance.

The Constitution of Vietnam ensures that men and women enjoy equal rights in all circumstances such as reproductive health: "The State, society, families and citizens have the responsibility to provide health care and protection to mother and children; and carry out the population and family planning program."

The Vietnamese National Assembly adopted the Law on Marriage and Family in 1960, which is based on four major principles – freedom of marriage; monogamy; gender equality; and the protection of women's and children's rights. The Law on the Protection of Public Health was passed on 30 June 1989, affirming people's right to make reproductive decisions over their body and choose their own contraceptive methods. It states that: "Women have the rights to have abortion; to receive gynecological diagnosis and treatment, and health check-up during pregnancy; and medical service when giving birth at health facilities."

By 1989, the Law on Protection of People's Health was approved, affirming the people's right to choose contraceptive methods.

In Article 6 of Decision No. 162 of the Council of Ministers in January 1989 obligated that the State was to provide, for free, birth control devices and public-health services for abortions to eligible persons: "The state will supply, free of charge, birth control devices, such as intrauterine loops and condoms, birth control pills and public health services for the insertion of intrauterine loops and abortions to eligible persons who are cadres, manual workers, civil servants or members of the armed forces, persons to whom priority is given under policy and poor persons who register to practice family planning." Also, Decree No. 12/CP on the promulgation of Social Insurance Regulations authorizes sick leave for abortions.

Significantly, the Criminal Code of Vietnam does not contain any provisions that criminalise abortion practices, pointing to its unrestricted legality in the country. Sex-selective abortion, a result of the country's son preference, is illegal but remained rampant and largely unpunished.

Family planning in Vietnam is helmed by the Ministry of Health (MOH) and National Committee for Population (NCPFP). Family planning and abortion services are provided through a network of MOH-approved healthcare centres, including central and provincial hospitals, provincial family planning centres, district hospitals and health centres, intercommunal polyclinics, and commune health centres. MOH-approved physicians, assistant physicians and trained midwives are legally allowed to perform abortions.

As defined in the current National Abortion Standards and Guidelines (NASGs), abortion services are made accessible at three administrative levels of the health system: (1) abortion from 6 to 18 weeks from the last menstrual period (LMP) is available at central and provincial hospitals; (2) abortion from 6 to 12 weeks of LMP is also available at district health stations; and (3) communal health clinics may only offer abortion to women who are not more than six weeks pregnant.

== Abortion rates ==
Vietnam has one of the highest abortion rates in the world. A study conducted by the Hanoi Central Obstetrics Hospital [vi] found that 40% of all pregnancies in Vietnam are terminated each year.
