= Abortion in Latvia =

Abortion in Latvia is legal and is available on request within the first 12 weeks of pregnancy, and available for medical reasons until 22 weeks. While Latvia was a republic of the Soviet Union, abortions were regulated by the Government of the Soviet Union. The Government of Latvia has a "surveillance system" which allows it to collect information on the numbers of abortions performed.

== History ==
Percentage of conceptions which led to abortion in Latvia

From 21 July 1940, Latvia was known as the Latvian Soviet Socialist Republic and followed the abortion laws of the Soviet Union (USSR). On 27 June 1936, the USSR banned abortions unless there was a danger to the life of the mother or the child would inherit a serious disease from the parents. Under this law, abortions were meant to be performed in maternity homes and hospitals, and physicians who disregarded this risked one to two years' imprisonment.

On 23 November 1955, the Government of the Soviet Union issued a decree which allowed abortions to be available on request. Later that year, abortion was restricted so that it could only be performed in the first three months of pregnancy, unless the birth would endanger the mother. Physicians had to perform abortions in hospitals, and unless the mother was in danger, a fee was charged. If the abortion was not performed in a hospital, the physician would be imprisoned for one year. If the person who performed the abortion did not have a medical degree, then they would be imprisoned for two years. If serious injuries or death were caused to a pregnant woman, there would be up to eight years of imprisonment.

The Government of the USSR was concerned about the rate of illegal abortions, and attempted to decrease their occurrence. On 31 December 1987, the Soviet Union announced that it would permit many medical institutions to perform abortions until the twenty-eighth week of pregnancy. Abortions occurred more frequently and in 1996, 44.1 abortions per 1,000 births occurred in Latvia.

The Fertility and Family Survey in 1995 found that 30% of women at age 25 had had an abortion. Due to the high abortion rate, Latvia's government is encouraging more births. As of 2013, an abortion can be performed without request up to the twelfth week of pregnancy, and can be requested up to the twenty-eighth.

A campaign named "For Life" ("Par dzīvību" in Latvian) has been set up to reduce the number of abortions in Latvia. In 1991, there were 34,633 births and 44,886 abortions, but this number has been falling since 1999. In 2011, around 7,000 abortions were performed.

As of 2010, the abortion rate was 15.6 abortions per 1,000 women aged 15 to 44 years.

Mifepristone (medical abortion) was registered in 2002.

== See also ==
- Abortion debate
