= Abortion in Algeria =

Algeria is the most restrictive country in the region regarding abortion. There are many laws and punishments regarding abortion. If there are posters, publicity, public meetings, or group meetings that have to do with abortion, anyone involved can be punished.

== Grounds for legal abortion ==
A government bill on health issues proposed to make abortions legal on three grounds:

1. The woman is psychologically and or mentally at risk.
2. Non-viable or severe fetal abnormality or disease.
3. The health or the life of the woman will be at risk if the pregnancy were to continue. When the woman is to see the doctor, the doctor must get the consent of that woman and inform her of the whole situation.

This is the text that was published when the bill was passed, "Therapeutic termination of pregnancy is intended to preserve the health of the mother and when her life or psychological and mental balance is seriously threatened by pregnancy. The detailed rules for the application of this article are laid down by regulation."

== Before August 14, 2018 ==
A new law for abortion was debated in the National Assembly. Before this, Algerians only option for abortion was to go to clinics or Tunisia. These clinics did not have any safety or good hygiene environments. The clinics did not meet any of the standards therefore would be risking the woman's life.

There have been many cases of death of a pregnant woman and where there have been fetuses' and newborns found in dumpsters and trash cans. This shows that there has been a huge distress of a woman seeking an abortion.

== Secret abortion clinics ==
There have been secret abortion clinics in Algeria. Many of the clients were young girls who made a mistake and wanted it to go away. Other clients were women who were housewives and when the husband found out about the babies, the mothers were forced to give them up. One common reason why these women go to the secret abortion clinics is because they do not want to be pushed away from their families. Another reason is they are truly not ready to care to a child. To pay for these illegal abortions, women commonly save money for long periods of time or sell jewelry.

== Abortion and rape ==
In 1998, there was an uproar about abortion in Algeria's laws because of women being raped by terrorists. There were obvious ground rules, but women wanted a change. Women wanted to have the right to get an abortion if they had been raped.

== International Campaign for Women's Right to Safe Abortion ==
This is a campaign that supports women's rights and protections so they can live in a safe environment. On the website they talk about many problems that are going on all over the world that involve women. One of the important topics they talk about on this website and campaign is abortion in Algeria. This campaign works with many people and protest with the women to get women the support they need with abortion. The campaign keeps people up to date and gives money to make a difference in theses women's lives.
