= Abortion in Albania =

Abortion in Albania was fully legalized on December 7, 1995. Abortion can be provided on demand until the twelfth week of pregnancy. Women must undergo counseling for a week prior to the procedure, and hospitals which perform abortions are not allowed to release information to the public regarding which women they have treated.

During the government of Enver Hoxha, Albania had a natalist policy, leading women to have abortions performed illegally or inducing them on their own. Women found guilty of aborting their pregnancies would either be shamed socially by the Party of Labour of Albania or sent to work in a reeducation program.

As with many other developing countries, sex-selective abortion is a common practice in the region, with author Marjola Rukaj commenting, "If it's a male, all is well. If it's a female, there's a dilemma. In Albania selective abortion is a widespread practice. According to the Council of Europe, in Albania for every 100 females 112 males are born..."

In 1989, abortion was legalized in the case of rape and incest or if the patient was under the age of 16. In 1991 abortion-by-application was introduced, allowing women to terminate their pregnancies for a variety of reasons if a board of medical practitioners agreed it was the best decision. The 1995 law nullifies all previous laws.

As of 2019, the abortion rate was 9 abortions per 1000 women aged 15–49 years.
