= Abortion in Bosnia and Herzegovina =

Abortion in Bosnia and Herzegovina is legal on request during the first ten weeks of pregnancy. Between ten and twenty weeks, an abortion must be approved by a committee and is permitted when the woman's life or health is threatened, when the fetus is severely impaired, when the pregnancy results from a crime, or for psychosocial reasons. In all cases, women must undergo counseling first. After 20 weeks, abortion is only permitted to save the woman's life or health. Only persons who perform illegal abortions are criminally punishable, never the women who undergo them.

The legal status of abortion is governed by a 2008 law; previously, it was governed by the Law of 7 October 1977, made when Bosnia and Herzegovina was part of Yugoslavia.

As of 2001, the abortion rate was 1.4 abortions per 1000 women aged 15–44 years, one of the lowest in Europe. The government has expressed concern about the higher rate among adolescents.

== Public opinion ==
In a Pew Research poll from 2017, the respondents from Bosnia and Herzegovina were evenly split between those who believed abortion should be legal in most cases (47%) and those who think it should be illegal in most cases (47%). However, there was a considerable divide between different ethnic and religious groups, with Catholics overwhelmingly against legal abortion (71%).
