= Abortion in Yemen =

In Yemen, abortions are only “permitted to save the life of a pregnant woman”, making it one of the strictest abortion laws in the Middle East and the world. Abortion is not widely accepted in Yemeni society. However, because of the recent conflict in Yemen, rape, honor killings, and unsafe abortions have increased in Yemen. According to a study conducted by Canadian Studies in Population, the number of unsafe and illegal abortions are high in Yemen, which can lead to fatal health risks for women.

== Background ==
Yemen is one of the lowest ranked countries on the Human Development Index. Because of the current crisis in Yemen's economy, much of the population is also unemployed, which has led the country to have a lack of basic necessities including health and educational services. The lack of proper healthcare resources in Yemen has affected women's reproductive health, including the safety of abortions as well.

== Legislation ==
=== History ===
Yemen is one of the oldest centers of civilizations in the Near East and in the world. In terms of abortion in the ancient Near East, “attitudes … varied” because “[b]oth the oldest medical literature on performing abortions and the first known law against abortion come from the Near East”. While there is not much information on the views and practices of abortion in ancient Yemen and the Near East, some historians say that fetuses were not considered separate entities with legal rights. Historians also say that procedures aimed to end pregnancies were not considered to be abortions most of the time. In ancient times, women had fewer rights than men in the Near East, so abortion was often not viewed “through the lens of women’s rights”.

=== Current legislation ===
Yemen's constitution states does not have a consistent view of whether or not a life starts at conception or at birth. Because of this, “ the Constitution of the Republic of Yemen of 2001 doesn't specify the moment when human rights take their legal effect”. Legislations made by the Yemeni government about the rights of children can be applicable to both an “embryo” and a “child after birth”. While this is the case, Article 4 — in a legislation called “On the Rights of the Child” (known as “the Law of the Republic of Yemen”) that was released on 22 September 2002 — states that “the right to life is absolute and cannot be diminished”.

The aforementioned legislation, “On the Rights of the Child,” states that Yemen is responsible for providing medical assistance to children “during pregnancy, delivery and after birth”. Legislations made by the Yemeni government about the rights of children can be applicable to both an “embryo” and a “child after birth”. Moreover, according to Articles 14, 15, 20, and 21 of the aforementioned law, “ the fetus has a right to be in family relations with its lawful father and mother after the birth”, and “it is prohibited to perform any actions that could provoke doubts on account of blood ties between a child and its parents”.

According to Article 239 of Yemen's Criminal Code (or Penal Code) published in 1994, having an abortion without the consent of the pregnant woman results in a punishment of “blood money of the embryo at first with half tenth of the blood money if her embryo is aborted while creation or dies inside her abdomen”. Additionally, according to Article 240 of Yemen's Criminal Code, having an abortion with the consent of the pregnant woman results in a punishment of “blood money of the embryo or full blood money according to the circumstances and the woman in this case is not entitled to anything of that or blood money”. According to Article 240 as well, a doctor will not be punished for giving a consensual abortion to a pregnant woman but only if it is to save her life; any other reason, including rape, is prohibited.

=== Islam’s role in abortion ===
Islam plays an important role in the views and laws made about abortion in Yemen. In fact, “abortion is considered a violation of religious moral codes”. Islamic law deeply values children, saying that “children are the divine mercy and a natural human need,” and according to Islamic Sharia law, children (whether naturalized legitimately or not) are necessary “to preserve the human race”. In fact, experts in the field of Islam and Islamic fundamentalism view the preservation of the human race as one of the prominent goals of Sharia. Because of this, abortions and “any methods that can terminate reproduction of humankind” are not allowed. In Yemen, Islam is a factor in whether doctors choose to perform abortions: in fact, some doctors will refuse to perform abortions on certain pregnant women after 12 weeks, “even if the woman's health is at risk, unless there is a fatwa from a religious sheikh”.

== Factors affecting abortions in Yemen ==
=== 1990s ===
One study, called “Age at Marriage, Contraceptive Use and Abortion in Yemen” by the Canadian Studies in Population, researched the status of abortion in Yemen from 1991 to 1997. The study found that pregnant women were less likely to receive illegal and unsafe abortions the more education they receive. The study also found that, in Yemen, jobs in professional fields make abortions less desirable. People that work in professional fields are less likely to obtain illegal and unsafe abortions because the potential health risks could interfere with their career and economic mobility. Moreover, the study found that pregnant women's decision on whether or not to obtain an abortion is dependent on their husband's view of contraception and family planning. The desire to have children decreases the likelihood that a pregnant woman will obtain an abortion.

=== 2014-present ===
Ever since the start of the Yemeni civil war in 2014, more pregnant women have requested abortions. Furthermore, because of the recent conflict, the majority of the Yemeni population, including approximately 11 million women and girls urgently need aid and humanitarian relief. As of 2019, only one third to a half of Yemen's medical facilities are still operating, which has further exacerbated the lack of reproductive health services for Yemeni women.

== Post-abortion care ==
Post-abortion care is crucial in countries that have strict abortion laws. In Yemen, there are post-abortion care programs that help assist women who obtain abortions. According to the Population Reference Bureau, post-abortion care in Yemen includes:

- “Emergency treatment for complications of abortion or miscarriage.
- Counseling to identify and respond to a woman’s emotional and physical health needs and other concerns.
- Family planning services to help prevent another unintended pregnancy.
- Reproductive or other health services provided on site or through referral to other facilities”.

Furthermore, Save the Children, an international humanitarian organization, also established a post-abortion care approach in Yemen since 2013. The post-abortion care program, also known as PAC, focuses “on capacity building; assurance of supplies and infrastructure; community collaboration and mobilization; and monitoring and evaluation”. Since 2013, the PAC program has been established in Yemen through 16 medical facilities by the government.

== Statistics ==
According to the World Health Organization, approximately 1.5 million abortions in the Middle East and North Africa region (MENA) in 2003 were performed under unsafe conditions by people that were not medical professionals. Additionally, about “11 percent of maternal deaths” were caused by complications from unsafe abortions in the MENA region.

In Yemen particularly, women have very few social and legal rights compared to men. In fact, Yemen ranked last in the Global Gender Gap Index rankings from the inception of the index in 2006 to 2020; in 2021, they ranked second to last. As of 2017, the maternal mortality rate in Yemen was 164 deaths per 100,000 live births, making it one of the highest in the regions of the Middle East and North Africa. While the maternal mortality rate has decreased since 1990, it is expected to increase because of the alterations to Yemeni society caused by the civil war.

From 2003 to 2009, there has been an increasing number of married women in Yemen that are using a method of contraception (from 13.4% in 2003 to 19% in 2009), which indicates a growing need for family planning services. However, family planning services are still lacking, and medical needs are still not being met. Additionally, the use of voluntary contraception has increased from 17% in 2013 to 38% in 2017 for women who have utilized post-abortion women who have gone through post-abortion care.

One study—called “Attitudes Toward Restricting the Sexual and Reproductive Rights of Women Living With HIV Infection in Yemen”—“surveyed 613 young adults from Yemen about their attitudes toward the sexual and reproductive rights of women living with HIV”. Among those that were surveyed, 62% believed that women living with HIV should be forced to get abortions if they became pregnant.

== See also ==
- Women in Yemen
