= Abortion in Vanuatu =

Abortion in Vanuatu is severely restricted by criminal law. Abortion is illegal under the provisions of section 117 of the Vanuatu Penal Code, Act No. 17 or 7 August 1981. The code states that any woman who intentionally induces a miscarriage is subject to up to two years' imprisonment. Abortion is illegal in cases of rape, incest, and threats to fetal health. The only allocations for abortion are "for good medical reasons", which a United Nations report interprets as to save the life of the pregnant woman and to preserve her physical and mental health. Section 113 of the code states that "No person shall, when a woman is about to be delivered of the child, prevent the child from being born alive by any act or omission of such a nature that, if the child had been born alive and had, then died..." although the italicized statement is vague about its meaning.

== Self-induced abortions ==
The Vanuatu Family Health Association reports various methods women use for self-induced abortions, including the use of local leaves or bark from a tree. Abortions like this that are outside of the medical system endanger the lives of women, as even an immediate visit to a nearby hospital or clinic may be futile if that medical facility does not have the equipment to repair any damage.
