= Abortion in Kyrgyzstan =

Abortion in Kyrgyzstan is legal up to 12 weeks in normal cases. This can be extended to 22 weeks for "social reasons" as agreed upon by a health professional. In cases of medical necessity, abortion is legal at any time. However, a majority of Kyrgyzstan's population is opposed to abortion due to it being considered Haram under Islamic law.

== History ==
=== Kirghiz SSR ===
As a member state of the Soviet Union, Stalin's law criminalizing abortion was repealed in 1955 and was replaced with a new law that was designed "to encourage motherhood and protect infancy." The decree implied that a majority of women would still seek to have children, and the Soviet government still sought to prevent abortion as much as possible.

There is no exact data on how the re-legalization of abortion in the Soviet Union directly affected the Kirghiz SSR, it is fair to assume that it was similar to the rest of the central Asian republics: most of them denouncing abortion due to it being incomparable with Islamic belief. The Kirghiz SSR was predominantly Muslim, which considers abortion as Haram.

=== Independent Kyrgyzstan ===
Since the dissolution of the Soviet Union, the rate of abortion in Kyrgyzstan has declined 66%, decreasing from 90 abortions per 1,000 women in 1990 to just 31 as of 2021. The country is a member of the Organization of Islamic Conferences, and is one of the few members to allow unrestricted abortion. 2015 research by the Ministry of Health of the Kyrgyz Republic put the figure of abortions per 1,000 births at 140.6.

While abortion is legal in Kyrgyzstan, due to the prevalence of Muslims in the country, many doctors have expressed concern about performing such operations. One female doctor in Osh told a researcher with the University of Minnesota said that she no longer counsels women about abortion options, nor does she perform them as "she now feels afraid to do so." Most women face social pressure to not get an abortion, due to the rising influence of Islam in the country.

== Laws ==
Abortion is not mentioned in Kyrgyzstan's constitution, although it does state that women and men will have "equal rights and freedoms and equal opportunities for their realization."

The official law on abortion, called the Law on Reproductive Rights of Citizens, legalizes abortion on a number of cases. It states in part that technology must be developed to help protect reproductive rights, and that abortion should be provided in the event that a woman wishes to terminate her pregnancy.

According to the United Nations, abortion is legal in Kyrgyzstan in cases of saving a women's life, saving her physical health, and saving her mental health. The same report states that the rate of abortion in Kyrgyzstan per 1,000 women is 12.4 as of 2011. A majority of the population, however, views abortion as immoral. Kyrgyzstan is a Muslim-majority country, and thus the social ideas of the population are shaped by the religion.
