= Abortion in Maine =

Abortion in Maine is legal throughout pregnancy, although terminations after fetal viability can only be performed if a physician determines it to be medically necessary. According to a poll by the Pew Research Center, 64% of adults said that abortion should be legal, with 33% stating that it should be illegal in all or most cases.

== History ==
=== Legislative history ===
The first abortion-related legislation was passed in the state in 1821. The second law was passed 19 years later, in 1840. In 1857, RS 1857, c. 124, §§7, 8, was passed related to the concealment of birth and procuring of abortions. It would be another 14 years before a law on this same theme was passed. In 1883, another law on concealment of birth and procuring of abortions was passed. Twenty more years would pass, and then a new law on concealment of birth and procuring of abortions passed in 1903. By the end of the 1800s, all states in the Union, except Louisiana, had therapeutic exceptions in their legislative bans on abortions.

Abortion-related legislation would again pass the Maine legislature in 1907, 1909, 1916, 1921, 1930, 1935, 1943, 1944, 1954, 1964, 1967, and 1969. Two abortion-related bills were passed 1971: one, LD 1373, "An Act Relating to Termination of Human Pregnancy by Therapeutic Abortion"; and the other, LD 1406, "An Act Relating to Termination of Human Pregnancy by Medical Decision".

In 1973, the year of the US Supreme Court Roe v. Wade ruling, seven pieces of legislation related to abortion were passed. These included HP 857, "Joint Resolution Memorializing Congress to Call A Convention for the Purpose of Amending the United States Constitution Relative to Abortion"; LD 887, "An Act Relating to Reporting of Data of Abortions Performed by an Attending Physician"; LD 888, "An Act Prohibiting the Use and Sale of Human Fetus for Experimentation"; LD 952, "An Act Relating to Discrimination Against Persons Who Refuse to Perform or Assist Abortions"; LD 953, "An Act Relating to Immunity of Persons or Hospitals Refusing to Perform or Assist in Abortions"; LD 1529, "An Act Regulating Abortion Procedures"; and LD 1824, "An Act to Prevent Criminal Abortion Practices". In 1974, HP 1897, a "Joint Order Commending the Pro-Life Education Association", was passed.

Maine passed abortion-related legislation in 1993 that said women have the right to "terminate a pregnancy before viability". Abortions need to be performed by a licensed physician. After the point where a fetus is viable, a pregnancy can only be terminated if the life or health of the mother is at risk. The state was one of 10 states in 2007 to have a customary informed-consent provision for abortions. In August 2018, the state had a law to protect the right to have an abortion. As of May 14, 2019, the state prohibited abortions after the fetus was viable, generally some point between week 24 and 28. This period uses a standard defined by the US Supreme Court in 1973 with the Roe v. Wade ruling.

In April 2024, the Maine Senate failed to pass an abortion rights amendment to the Maine Constitution by the necessary 2/3 vote required to send the issue to voters. The vote, 20–13, was along party lines, with Democrats in favor and Republicans opposed.

=== Judicial history ===
The U.S. Supreme Court's decision in 1973's Roe v. Wade meant the state could no longer regulate abortion in the first trimester. However, the Supreme Court overturned Roe v. Wade in Dobbs v. Jackson Women's Health Organization, No. 19-1392, 597 U.S. ___ (2022) later in 2022.

=== Clinic history ===
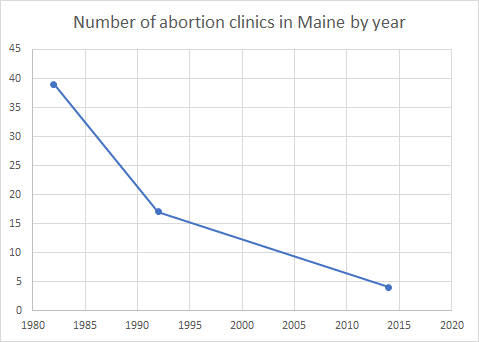
Number of abortion clinics in Maine by year

Between 1982 and 1992, the number of abortion clinics in the state decreased by 33, going from 39 in 1982 to 17 in 1992. In 2014, there were 4 abortion clinics in the state. In 2014, 81% of the counties in the state did not have an abortion clinic. That year, 55% of women in the state aged 15–44 lived in a county without an abortion clinic. In 2017, there were 4 Planned Parenthood clinics, 1 of which offered abortion services in a state with a population of 278,104 women aged 15–49.

== Statistics ==
In the period between 1972 and 1974, there were no recorded illegal abortion deaths in the state. In 1990, 143,000 women in the state faced the risk of an unintended pregnancy. In 2010, the state had 15 publicly funded abortions, all of which were federally funded. In 2013, among white women aged 15–19, there were 280 abortions, for black women aged 15–19, there were 10 abortions, for Hispanic women aged 15–19, there were 0 abortions, and there were 10 abortions for women of all other races. In 2014, 64% of adults said in a poll by the Pew Research Center that abortion should be legal with 33% stating it should be illegal in all or most cases. In 2017, the state had an infant mortality rate of 5.7 deaths per 1,000 live births.

Number of reported abortions, abortion rate, and percentage change in rate by geographic region and state in 1992, 1995 and 1996
Census division and state	Number			Rate			% change 1992–1996
Census division and state	1992	1995	1996	1992	1995	1996	% change 1992–1996
Total	1,528,930	1,363,690	1,365,730	25.9	22.9	22.9	–12
New England	78,360	71,940	71,280	25.2	23.6	23.5	–7
Connecticut	19,720	16,680	16,230	26.2	23	22.5	–14
Maine	4,200	2,690	2,700	14.7	9.6	9.7	–34
Massachusetts	40,660	41,190	41,160	28.4	29.2	29.3	3
New Hampshire	3,890	3,240	3,470	14.6	12	12.7	–13
Rhode Island	6,990	5,720	5,420	30	25.5	24.4	–19

Number, rate, and ratio of reported abortions, by reporting area of residence and occurrence and by percentage of abortions obtained by out-of-state residents, US CDC estimates
Location	Residence			Occurrence			% obtained by out-of-state residents	Year	Ref
Location	No.	Rate^	Ratio^^	No.	Rate^	Ratio^^	% obtained by out-of-state residents	Year	Ref
Maine	1,939	8.3	153	2,021	8.6	159	3.6	2014	
Maine	1,743	7.5	138	1,836	7.9	146	3.1	2015	
Maine	1,937	8.4	152	2,021	8.7	159	3.5	2016	
^number of abortions per 1,000 women aged 15–44; ^^number of abortions per 1,000 live births

== Abortion rights views and activities ==
=== Protests ===
Women from the state participated in marches supporting abortion rights as part of a #StoptheBans movement in May 2019.

Following the overturn of Roe v. Wade on June 24, 2022, Bangor Daily News counted over a thousand abortion rights protesters gathered in Portland in front of Portland City Hall. On June 30, hundreds of abortion rights protestors gathered in Lewiston.
