= Abortion in Laos =

Abortion in Laos is governed by legislation that permits the procedure under specific circumstances. A legislative draft prepared in 2021 outlines the conditions under which abortion is allowed, including cases involving the health of the pregnant individual, socioeconomic factors, fetal conditions, pregnancy loss, rape, and contraceptive failure. Public awareness of induced abortion among Laotian adolescents remains limited, though available survey data suggests majority support for individual reproductive choice among those who are aware of it.

== Legislation ==
In 2021, authorities drafted legislation to allow abortion in certain circumstances.

Under the legislative draft, abortion is permitted in the following cases:

- The pregnant individual has significant health conditions including heart disease, blood diseases, mental health issues, cancer, kidney disease, among others named in the legislation.
- The pregnant individual is a member of a low-income family, has more than four children already, or is below the age of majority.
- The foetus has an intellectual disability, or has been exposed to poison or over 15 rads of radiation.
- The foetus was otherwise lost.
- The pregnancy was a result of rape or birth control failure.

== Public opinion ==
A study published in 2020 suggested that 1 in 3 Laotian adolescents were aware of induced abortion. Of those, 71% believed that the decision to have an abortion should be the woman's personal choice.

== See also ==
- Health in Laos
