= Abortion in Serbia =

Abortion in Serbia was legalized in its current form (in Serbia and the other former Yugoslav republics) on October 7, 1977. Abortion on demand is available for women whose pregnancies have not exceeded the tenth week, and in the case of risk to life or health of woman (no limit specified), or when the pregnancy has resulted from a sex offence (including rape or incest), or in case of fetal impairment up to twenty weeks. Minors under 16 require parental consent before undergoing an abortion.

The 2006 constitution of Serbia states that "everyone has the right to decide on childbirth", which is effectively an implicit right to abortion.

Some estimates suggest that Serbia has the highest abortion rate in Europe. Official data from the Belgrade Institute of Public Health claims that 23,000 abortions are performed in Serbia annually, but unofficial data suggests a number as high as 150,000. Although abortions performed after ten weeks must be done only if there is a specific approved reason, in practice, elective abortions are provided later than the legal limit – women often obtain fake medical documentation, such as a note from a psychiatrist stating that they are mentally unstable. Furthermore, doctors who want to perform abortions have to obtain a license; because the process of obtaining this license can be strict and complicated many doctors work illegally without a license, and do not report the abortions that they perform. Until recently, abortion was a leading method of birth control in what is now the country of Serbia. Lack of sex education, coupled with little to no knowledge of contraception methods led to many unwanted pregnancies, and with them, a high number of terminations. In the 1970s and 1980s, approximately 12 percent of sexually active women in Serbia used modern contraception such as condoms.

In 2009, 23.2% of pregnancies in Serbia ended in abortion. The highest year on record was 1989, when 68% of pregnancies were terminated. As recently as 2006, Serbia continued to have the highest rate of abortions out of the former Yugoslav republics.

Mifepristone (medical abortion) was registered in 2002.

== Public opinion ==
A Pew Research poll from 2017 showed that 63% of Serbians believe abortion should be legal in all/most cases, while 31% think it should be illegal in all/most cases.
