= Abortion in the United States Virgin Islands =

Abortion in the United States Virgin Islands is legal on request up to 24 weeks of pregnancy, and afterwards only in cases that endanger the life or health of the mother. There are five clinics providing abortion in the territory. Women travel from the British Virgin Islands for abortions because it is illegal there.

== Legal status ==
Abortion is allowed in the United States Virgin Islands on request up to 24 weeks of pregnancy, and afterwards only in cases that endanger the life or health of the mother. Abortion may only be performed by a licensed physician, and after 12 weeks of pregnancy only by a surgeon or gynecologist at a hospital.

== Abortion clinics ==
As of 2019, there are five clinics providing abortion in the U.S. Virgin Islands. One is in St. Thomas, one is in St. Croix, and three are in St. John.

== History ==
Women from the British Virgin Islands who want an abortion were traveling to St. Thomas in the U.S. Virgin Islands in 2016 to get an abortion because abortion is illegal in the British Virgin Islands. Pregnant women in the U.S. Virgin Islands were at risk of getting the Zika virus, which causes major fetal defects. These defects can be so severe that health care professionals recommend termination of the pregnancy.

== Contraceptives ==
As of 1994, the U.S. Virgin Islands included family planning services as part of their Medicaid program. These services included contraceptive services and supplies, and sterilizations.
