= Abortion in Tuvalu =

Abortion in Tuvalu is only legal if the abortion will save the mother's life. If an abortion is performed on a woman for any other reason, the violator is subject to ten years in prison. A woman who performs a self-induced abortion may be imprisoned for life.
