= Abortion in Timor-Leste =

Abortion in Timor-Leste is only legal if the abortion will save the woman's life, overall health, and if her pregnancy was caused by rape, an exception made by Parliament in 2009. Women's groups and NGOs have been advocating for abortion laws to include instances of incest and child endangerment.

In Timor-Leste, any abortion approved to preserve the woman's health requires consent from three physicians. All other abortions are criminal offenses, and the person who performs the abortion as well as the pregnant woman face up to three years of imprisonment.

== History ==
Abortion law in Timor-Leste is based on the abortion law of Indonesia which ruled East Timor between 1976 and 1999 and which has been updated since independence in 2002.
