= Abortion in Montenegro =

Abortion in Montenegro is legal on request during the first ten weeks of pregnancy. Between 10 and 20 weeks, abortions must be approved a committee, and may only be performed for medical reasons, if the child is expected to be born with serious disabilities, if the pregnancy is the result of a crime, or if the woman could face serious family circumstances during pregnancy or after birth. Between 20 and 32 weeks, abortions must be approved by an ethics committee, and are only granted for medical reasons or in the case of serious fetal defects; after 32 weeks, abortions can only be permitted to save the pregnant woman's life. The current abortion law, which dates from 2009, repealed the previous 1977 law enacted by Yugoslavia.

The woman must pay for an abortion performed on request, and abortions can only be performed in medical institutions that meet certain minimum standards. Sex-selective abortion is specifically prohibited, as are tests of the fetus's sex during the first ten weeks of pregnancy. However, the ratio of males to females at birth was 109.8 over 2009-2011, an abnormally high number that, according to a report by the United Nations Population Fund, suggests sex selection is occurring.

As of 2010, the abortion rate was 6.3 abortions per 1000 women aged 15–44.
