= Abortion in Estonia =

Abortion in Estonia has been legal since 23 November 1955, when Estonia was part of the Soviet Union. Estonia fine-tuned their legislation after the restoration of independence.

Percentage of conceptions which led to abortion in Estonia.

Estonia allows abortion on-demand for any purpose, before the end the 11th week of pregnancy. Later abortions are permitted up to the 21st week (included) if the woman is younger than 15 years old or older than 45 years old, if the pregnancy endangers the woman's health, if the child may have a serious physical or mental defect, or if the woman's illness or other medical problem hinders the child's development.

Women who want to have an abortion for personal reasons not specified in the abortion legislation will be expected to pay a fee according to the abortion provider's price list. Abortion performed for medical reasons is covered for insured persons by the Estonian Health Insurance Fund.

38.7% of pregnancies ended in abortion in Estonia in 2006, a decline from 49.4% just six years before.

In 2010, there were 9087 abortions in Estonia, which meant 57.4 abortions for every hundred live births. As of 2010, the abortion rate was 25.5 abortions per 1000 women aged 15–44 years.

== Medication ==
Mifepristone (medical abortion) was registered in 2003.
