= Abortion in the Marshall Islands =

Abortion in the Marshall Islands is only legal if the abortion will save the pregnant woman's life. In the Marshall Islands, even if physicians determine an abortion is life-saving for the woman, she must receive consent from her spouse, undergo counseling, and she must sign a form consenting to use family planning services after the medical procedure. Before any treatment related to reproductive health, minors need consent from a parent or guardian.

Out of the 24 inhabited atolls, only 2 (Majuro and Kwajalein) have facilities providing information about pre and postnatal care, contraception, and skilled delivery assistance. Because abortions are not readily available as an elective procedure, some women attempt to carry out a self-induced abortion (through local or traditional methods) or have someone punch them in the stomach.
