= Abortion in Slovakia =

Abortion in Slovakia is legal on request until 12 weeks of pregnancy, and for medical reasons at later stages. Abortion was fully legalized on 23 October 1986. Abortions were provided with restrictions in Slovakia and what is now the Czech Republic as early as 19 December 1957, but it was the 1986 law which removed the requirement of medical approval for abortions before the twelfth week of pregnancy. Girls under 16 require parental consent for an abortion, while girls aged 16 and 17 can have the procedure performed without consent but the parents still have to be notified.

To procure an elective abortion, a woman must have not exceeded the twelfth week of her pregnancy, and she must make her request for an abortion known in writing to her gynaecologist, and counseling and birth control information is given to the woman, and she is referred to a hospital to terminate her pregnancy. After twelve weeks, a group of physicians must approve the abortion, which in practice only occurs if there is a chance of irreparable harm for either the fetus or the mother.

In October 2020, a bill that would have tightened abortion law was defeated by the Parliament of Slovakia, with 59 votes against and 58 votes in favor.

The abortion rate peaked in the late 1980s after the liberalization of the old abortion law, with nearly 40 abortions per 100 births. In 2004, the figure fell below 15 abortions per 100 births, its lowest rate since the government started tracking abortion figures in 1958.

As of 2010, the abortion rate was 13.9 abortions per 1000 women aged 15-44 years.
