= Abortion in Sri Lanka =

Abortion is illegal in Sri Lanka except when it is needed to save the life of the pregnant mother. It is punishable by up to three years imprisonment.

Attempts to liberalize abortion law in 1995, 2011, and 2013 were unsuccessful.

One 1998 UN report estimated an abortion rate of 45 for every 1,000 women of reproductive age.

Despite the law, mifepristone and misoprostol can be purchased under the table at many pharmacies.
