= Abortion in Washington =

Abortion in Washington may refer to:

- Abortion in Washington (state)
- Abortion in Washington, D.C.
