= Abortion in Barbados =

Abortion in Barbados is legal when performed to save the life of the woman, to preserve her physical or mental health, in cases of foetal impairment, when the pregnancy was caused by rape or incest, and for economic or social reasons. In 1983, Barbados passed the Medical Termination of Pregnancy Act, and abortion was made legal, other than upon request without a physician's oversight. Prior to 12 weeks gestation, the woman must get approval from a physician to obtain an abortion. Between 12 and 20 weeks, two physicians must approve, and three are required after 20 weeks. Before getting the medical procedure, the woman is required to receive counseling. A medical practitioner must perform the abortion services, and after 12 weeks, they must do so in a government-approved hospital.

== Medical Termination of Pregnancy Act ==
In 1983, the Barbados parliament passed the Medical Termination of Pregnancy Act, decriminalizing abortion. Billie Miller, the first woman to serve as minister of health in Barbados, campaigned for seven years to encourage her colleagues to decriminalize medical care for women. Passage of this new law made Barbados the first English-speaking country in the Caribbean to decriminalize abortion.
