= Abortion in Nepal =

Nepal legalised abortion in March 2002, under the 11th Amendment to the Civil Code. The legal services were successfully implemented on December 25, 2003. The high maternal mortality rates in Nepal led to the government legalising it. More than 500,000 women sought abortion between 2004 and 2014. In 2014, 323,100 women in Nepal had abortions; of these, only 42% of abortions were legal and 19% were treated for abortion complications. A similar study found a 50% rate of unintended pregnancy.

== Methods for abortion ==
According to the services provided by the government, women are allowed to choose between manual vacuum aspiration (MVA) and medical abortion (MA) abortion procedures.

Manual vacuum aspiration: It is a moderately invasive procedure where cervical dilators are used and suction is applied to remove the pregnancy from the uterus.

Medical abortion: Medical abortion is a method most often combining a series of two types of oral pills taken to terminate the pregnancy. The experience is similar to a miscarriage and many patients feel it is a less invasive option.

== Abortion law in Nepal ==
Prior to 2002, Nepal had strict anti-abortion laws which ensured not only the imprisonment of the pregnant women who seek abortion but also their family members. In fact about 20% of women prisoners were imprisoned for abortion-related choices.

According Safe Motherhood and Reproductive Health Rights Act (2018), A pregnant woman shall have the right to get safe abortion performed in any of the following circumstances:

(a) Fetus (gestation) up to twelve weeks, with the consent of the pregnant woman,

(b) Fetus (gestation) up to twenty-eight weeks, as per the consent of such woman, after the opinion of the licensed doctor that there may be danger upon the life of the pregnant woman or her physical or mental health may deteriorate or disabled infant may be born in case the abortion is not performed,

(c) Fetus (gestation) remained due to rape or incest, fetus (gestation) up to twenty-eight weeks with the consent of the pregnant woman,

(d)Fetus (gestation) up to twenty-eight weeks with the consent of the woman who is suffering from H.I.V. or other incurable disease of such nature,

(e) Fetus (gestation) up to twenty eight weeks with the consent of the woman, as per the opinion of the health worker involved in the treatment that damage may occur in the womb due to defects occurred in the fetus (gestation), or that there is such defect in the fetus of the womb that it cannot live even after the birth, that there is condition of disability in the fetus (gestation) due to genetic defect or any other cause.
