= Abortion in Nauru =

Abortion in Nauru is only legal if the abortion will save the woman's life. In Nauru, if an abortion is induced for any other reason, the violator is subject to fourteen years' imprisonment. A woman who consents to her abortion or performs her own may be imprisoned for up to seven years.

== Abortion care for refugees and asylum seekers ==
=== African refugee S99 ===
In 2016, a young African refugee in Nauru, identified in the courts only as "S99," was raped while semi-conscious during an epileptic seizure. S99 became pregnant from the rape and sought an abortion to terminate the pregnancy. Since the procedure is illegal in Nauru, even in cases of rape, S99 requested medical services in Australia. Instead, Australian authorities sent S99 to Papua New Guinea, even though abortion in Papua New Guinea is also illegal unless the mother's physical or mental health is determined to be at risk. S99 was concerned about the legal implications and the safety of receiving abortions in Papua New Guinea because of her complications from epilepsy, so she asked her lawyer for a transfer to Australian soil. The court eventually found a responsibility in caring for the woman and ordered she be allowed to get an abortion.

=== Proposed abortion laws ===
In November 2016, Nauru's Border Protection Minister David Adeang introduced a bill to allow abortion services for refugees and asylum seekers, rather than sending them to Papua New Guinea or Australia. The bill was opposed by members of Parliament on both sides of the aisle. Critics of the bill cite the Nauruan community's staunch Christianity as one reason for opposition.
