= Abortion in Bahrain =

Abortion in Bahrain is legal only when the mother's life is in danger or when the pregnancy puts the mother's physical or mental health at risk. It is not available by request. Article 19 of Legislative Decree No. 7 of 1989 states that the procedure can only be done upon authorization by a panel of three physicians licensed to operate in Bahrain and with consent from the pregnant woman's guardian.

== Legal consequences ==
By the Penal Code of 1976, self-induced abortion results in up to six months imprisonment for the pregnant woman, or up to ten years of imprisonment when it is performed without the woman's consent. If the woman dies during a nonconsensual abortion, the penalty can be raised to up to 15 years of imprisonment.

Under Bahraini law, abortion is only legally punishable if successful; there are no defined legal consequences for attempting to abort. Additionally, consequences for a successful abortion do not become more severe in the event of aggravating factors (e.g., sterility or disability).

Under Article 70 of the Penal Code of 1976, extenuating circumstances can result in a lesser sentence. This includes if the individual committing the crime is a minor, or if the crime is committed for honorable reasons. In certain cases, this can be applied to instances where an abortion is performed due to rape and/or incest.

== Exceptions ==
An abortion can legally be performed in Bahrain only if the pregnancy jeopardizes the mother's life, or if the pregnancy risks the mother's mental or physical health. The procedure requires both a guardian's consent and authorization from at least three physicians who are licensed to operate in Bahrain. The abortion must be performed by a gynecologist in a public or private hospital once consent is received from the mother's guardian.
