= Abortion in the Solomon Islands =

Abortion in Solomon Islands is only legal if the abortion will save the mother's life. In Solomon Islands, if an abortion is performed on a woman for any other reason, the violator is subject to a life sentence in prison. A woman who performs a self-induced abortion may also be imprisoned for life.

Any approved abortion requires consent from two physicians as well as the woman's husband or next of kin.
