= Abortion in Sint Maarten =

In Sint Maarten, a Dutch Caribbean constituent country of the Kingdom of the Netherlands, foreign policy is set by the Netherlands but all other laws including those related to abortion are self-determined. Abortion in Sint Maarten is illegal, although it may be permissible in circumstances where a pregnancy threatens the woman's life. Despite its illegality, abortions are routinely performed by some medical practitioners and are ignored by authorities.

== Legislation ==
Sint Maarten's abortion law is modelled after Dutch common law which was adopted by the Netherlands' foreign colonies in 1918. This law, covered in Articles 308 to 311, prohibits the act of abortion with no exceptional circumstances. For a woman who procures her own abortion or a health practitioner who intentionally assists, the penalties range from three to 15 years of imprisonment, depending on whether the woman consents to the procedure, whether the woman dies as a result, and whether a qualified health professional is involved. Any woman "who intentionally causes the expulsion or the death of her fruit" can be imprisoned for up to three years, while assistants to abortion can be imprisoned for up to four years and six months if the woman consents to the procedure (increasing to six years if the woman dies) or up to 12 years if the woman does not give her permission (increasing to 15 years if the woman dies). The maximum sentences may be raised by a third if a health professional is involved—including doctors, midwives and pharmacists—and they may be banned from their profession. Although not explicitly stated in the articles relating to abortion law, the principle of necessity may be used as a justification for breaking criminal law if an abortion is required to save a pregnant woman's life.

Although the Netherlands legalised abortion in 1981, the reform was not adopted by any of the former colonies in the Dutch Caribbean, including Sint Maarten, Aruba and Curaçao, which instead retain the old Dutch common law. These three territories became autonomous countries in 2010, but there remains public apprehension about whether the Netherlands will continue to attempt to "impose its liberal values and legislation" on the Dutch Caribbean, with abortion law being a chief concern.

== Access to abortion services ==
Although abortion is illegal in Sint Maarten, it is fairly commonplace as part of a system of "institutionalised tolerance". Since the 1981 Dutch law allowed abortion, Sint Maarten physicians and officials have become more tolerant of abortion despite the fact that Sint Maarten's own law did not change. The Ministry of Health in the nearby island country of Curaçao has had an ongoing agreement with abortion providers in Sint Maarten, providing inspections of the facilities for quality of care.

Abortion is more accessible in the neighbouring country of the Collectivity of Saint Martin—which forms the other half of the island Saint Martin—where medical abortion using misoprostol is legal until 14 weeks' gestation and is universally available to those without health insurance. It is therefore common for women in Sint Maarten seeking abortions to travel to Saint Martin, "just a walk away across the border".

Overall, the abortion rate in the Dutch Antilles is similar to that of Dutch Antillean women living in the Netherlands; this is around eight times higher than the abortion rate amongst native Dutch women.
