= Abortion in Oman =

Abortion in Oman is prohibited, except where there are risks to the mother's life or fatal fetal abnormalities.

Medical practitioners have reported that unmarried women are sometimes pressured to have abortions.
