= Abortion in Iraq =

Abortion in Iraq is illegal.

It is difficult to obtain sociological information about abortions in Iraq because women may be likely to lie about or misrepresent their history with the topic, due to its sensitive nature.

== Legality ==
Administering or receiving abortions in Iraq is illegal. The legal penalty for either action is no more than a year of imprisonment and a fine. If a woman has an abortion due to shame this is a legally mitigating circumstance that may lessen the penalty.

== Reasons for abortions ==
One doctor describes that some Iraqi women desire abortions because they believe their child would not live long, due to malnutrition or disease.

Instances of abortions increase due to lack of access to birth control. IUDs are a common method of birth control in Iraq, but increased in price following economic sanctions applied after the Gulf War.

== Attitudes towards abortion ==
One study of 1302 women in Mosul found that 13.5% had induced an abortion in themselves. Another study, of Iraqi Kurdistan found that 27.7% of women surveyed had had an abortion.

A majority of the surveyed women in Mosul had done so through physical exertion. Women who were more likely to induce abortions included those who were Christian rather than Muslim; Arab rather than Kurdish or Turkmen; urban rather than rural or suburban, women with unemployed rather than employed husbands; living in a nuclear family rather than an extended family; younger; educated; or not on contraceptives.

The survey in Iraqi Kurdistan found that women were more likely to have had an abortion if they were older, had more children, and less educated.

A majority of gynecologists in Iraqi Kurdistan in one study felt that women should not have the right to choose to induce an abortion; that induced abortion is murder; and that induced abortion should not be legal. 41% of the surveyed gynecologists believed that induced abortion is amoral. 97% reported that they willingly provide care to patients seeking medical assistance after an abortion, including those performed illegally.

== Epidemiology ==
Some of the reported complications from unsafe abortions in Iraq include sepsis, incomplete abortion, and bleeding.
