= Abortion in Fiji =

Abortion in Fiji is legal in cases of rape, incest, fetal impairment, to preserve a woman's physical health, mental health, or save her life. However, the law generally does not allow voluntary abortion as it is against religious beliefs, since Fiji is a stronghold of Christianity with other religious beliefs that prohibit abortion. Abortion in Fiji is a taboo; however, according to statistics, teenage pregnancy has become a prevalent issue and young mothers end up having abortions. In Fiji, any approved abortion requires authorisation from a physician.

== History ==
In 2010, abortions to end pregnancies that are a result of rape or incest became legally available to women.
