= Abortion in North Macedonia =

Abortion in North Macedonia is legal on request during the first 12 weeks of pregnancy, and in special circumstances between 12 and 22 weeks. Abortion in the Republic of North Macedonia is regulated by a 2019 law.

The 1977 law regulating abortion, enacted while still part of Yugoslavia as the Socialist Republic of Macedonia, was not significantly altered until 2013. Between 2013 and 2019 abortion access was restricted due to a law passed by a conservative government in 2013. A new law was passed in 2019 liberalizing access.

At its peak in 1986, the abortion rate in the Republic of Macedonia was 70.6 abortions per 1,000 women aged 15–44; the rate fell after independence, to 28.5 by 1996. As of 2010, the abortion rate was 11.1 abortions per 1000 women aged 15–44.

== The 2013 Law on Termination of Pregnancy (in force 2013-2019) ==
Between 2005 and 2016, conservatives held the majority in Macedonian politics, promoting traditional values. An anti-abortion movement developed, which culminated with a new anti-abortion law in 2013. The government of Macedonia, backed by the Macedonian Orthodox Church, has also conducted advertising campaigns against abortion, aimed at increasing the country's birth rate. Although abortion was still permitted, access had been restricted. In 2013, the Parliament passed the law, just 20 days after it had received the first draft. Although some changes from the original draft of the law were made, due to opposition from the public and NGOs, several restrictions remained. The new law enacted included: mandatory filing of a written request for the termination of unwanted pregnancy by the woman to the appropriate health institution, mandatory counseling about the potential advantages of continuing the pregnancy, as well as about the health risks for the woman from undergoing an abortion, and a mandatory waiting period of three days after counseling before medical intervention is conducted to terminate the pregnancy. The original form of the law also stipulated that the woman's partner had to be informed about the abortion – a provision which was withdrawn. The International Planned Parenthood Federation criticized the law, as well as the anti-abortion campaigns, saying that they stigmatize women and abridge their rights.

== The 2019 Law on Termination of Pregnancy ==
A new law was enacted in 2019, broadening access to abortion.
