= Abortion in Lithuania =

Abortion in Lithuania is legal and available on request until the ninth week of pregnancy using special medication, up to 12th week using surgery and up to 22 weeks for medical reasons using surgery. While Lithuania was a Republic of the Soviet Union (as the Lithuanian Soviet Socialist Republic), abortions were regulated by the Government of the Soviet Union.

== History ==
Percentage of conceptions aborted in Lithuania

After becoming the Lithuanian Soviet Socialist Republic on 21 July 1940, Lithuania followed the abortions laws of the Soviet Union. On 27 June 1936, the Soviet Union banned abortions unless there was a danger to the life of the mother or the child would inherit a serious disease from the parents. Under this law abortions were meant to be performed in maternity homes and hospitals, and physicians who disregarded this risked one to two years' imprisonment.

On 23 November 1955, the Soviet Union issued a decree which allowed abortions to be available on request. Later that year abortion was restricted so that it could only be performed in the first three months of pregnancy unless the birth would endanger the mother. Physicians had to perform abortions in hospitals and, unless the mother was in danger, a fee was charged. If the abortion was not performed in a hospital, the physician could be imprisoned for one year, while a person not in possession of a medical degree could be imprisoned for two years. The serious injury or death of a pregnant woman could result in the sentence being extended up to eight years.

The Government of the Soviet Union was concerned about the rate of illegal abortions and attempted to decrease their occurrence. On 31 December 1987, the Soviet Union announced that it would allow many medical institutions to perform abortions until the twenty-eighth week of pregnancy. In 1989, there were 50,100 abortions and 55,782 live births in Lithuania. By 2010, the number of abortions decreased to 6,989 abortions and 35,626 live births. As of 2010, the abortion rate was 9.8 abortions per 1000 women aged 15–44 years.

From 1995 to 2000, the total fertility rate in Lithuania was 1.4 children/per woman, which the government officially wants to increase. Lithuania's low fertility rate, and its Catholic traditions make abortion a controversial political issue, and regular attempts to restrict it occur. There have been several attempts in recent years to adopt a more restrictive law on abortion, especially after 2005. Such attempts are particularly associated with the Polish minority.

In May 2025, the a law passed Lithuanian parliament to enshrine abortion rights.
