= Abortion in Moldova =

Abortion in Moldova is legal on request within the first 12 weeks of pregnancy, and generally permitted until 28 weeks for a broad variety of reasons determined by the Ministry of Health. The Ministry of Health orders permit abortions until 22 weeks in the event of a threat to health, a pregnancy that results from a crime, a fetus with genetic defects or for social reasons, and abortions are permitted until 28 weeks if the fetus has severe malformations or congenital syphilis. Abortions must be carried out in authorized medical facilities by obstetricians and gynecologists.

Percentage of conceptions aborted in Moldova

Prior to independence, abortion in Moldova was governed by the abortion laws of the Soviet Union. Abortion laws have not changed significantly since then.

The abortion rate in Moldova has declined sharply since independence. In 1989, the Moldavian Soviet Socialist Republic reported a rate of 93.0 abortions per 1,000 women aged 15 to 44 years, which was among the highest reported rates in the Soviet Union; the actual rate was much higher. The abortion rate fell to 50 in 1994, 38.8 in 1996, 30.8 in 1998 and 17.6 in 2004. As of 2010, the abortion rate was 18.0 abortions per 1,000 women aged 15–44 years.

Maternal mortality due to unsafe abortions remains a problem in Moldova.

In 2006, a young woman was arrested for an illegal abortion, convicted of intentional murder and sentenced to 20 years imprisonment. She was freed in 2012 after international pressure.
