= Abortion in Luxembourg =

Abortion in Luxembourg was liberalized on 15 November 1978. Before the end of 12 weeks after conception (14 weeks after the last menstrual period), a woman who determines herself to be "in distress" can obtain an abortion after two consultations with a doctor, one medical and one psycho-social, and a waiting period of at least three days. An abortion at later stages can only be obtained when two doctors certify there is a danger to the mother or fetus. Under-age patients must be accompanied by a trusted adult to the meetings and the procedure itself. Abortions may be performed in hospitals, clinics, and a doctor's surgery.

Before reforms passed in 2012, only a doctor could determine if a woman was "in distress". Abortions in the first twelve weeks were only permitted in the event of a physical or mental health threat to the mother, a serious risk that the child would be born with a serious disease or serious defects, or a pregnancy resulting from rape. Under-age patients needed to obtain parental consent for an abortion, and abortions could only be performed in hospitals and clinics.

Many doctors in Luxembourg opt out of providing abortion services as conscientious objectors. Doctors who choose not to conduct an abortion, or are incapable of doing so, are required to refer the patient to another medical practitioner under the 2012 law.

== 21st century liberalization ==
In March 2026, the Chamber of Deputies passed a constitutional amendment enshrining the right to abortion in Luxembourg's national law. This made Luxembourg the second country in the world to legalise abortion at a constitutional level; after France in 2024.
