= Abortion in Kiribati =

Abortion in Kiribati is only legal if the abortion will save the mother's life. In Kiribati, if an abortion is performed on a woman for any other reason, the violator is subject to ten years in prison. If a woman performs a self-induced abortion, she may be imprisoned for life.
