= Abortion in the Federated States of Micronesia =

Abortion in the Federated States of Micronesia is only legal if the abortion will save the woman's life.

== History ==
Before the Federated States of Micronesia gained sovereignty in 1986, its laws followed the codes set in place by the Trust Territory of the Pacific Islands, meaning the territory legally observed abortion laws in the United States. With independence, the nation was authorized to set its own laws regarding abortion, and government officials priotized local customs in court cases that charged abortion as a criminal act.

=== Local abortion practice ===
In the Federated States of Micronesia, women have traditionally induced abortion with local herbs, by inserting foreign bodies into the womb, or through ritual bathing and massages. The rate of local remedies for abortion is difficult to determine because cases are only reported when the abortion leads to severe injury, hospitalization, or death.
