= Abortion in the Bahamas =

Abortion in the Bahamas is illegal in most cases.

In 2022, Prime Minister Philip Davis’ Press Secretary Clint Watson confirmed that abortion would remain illegal for the foreseeable future, according to Caribbean news site Loop. However, Watson said that this could change in future if people's views change.

According to the Bahamas Penal Code article 315, "Whoever intentionally and unlawfully causes abortion or miscarriage shall be liable to imprisonment for ten years".

Abortions can only be performed in cases of foetal deformity, rape or incest, and on health grounds. However, in response to a periodic review by the UN's CEDAW committee, the Bahamian government said that “Abortions are usually performed within the first trimester, although they are often allowed up to 20 weeks of gestation. The abortion must be performed in a hospital by a licensed physician. Government hospitals bear the cost for non-paying patients.”

According to The Tribune, "A respected medical doctor, who works in the public system, told The Tribune, there are no statistics on abortion because the market for abortions in the Bahamas is underground." The doctor added that there is a culture of “Don’t ask, don’t tell.”

In February 2022, Bahamian Health Minister Dr Michael Darville refused to answer when asked what the government's position was on abortion.

In 2022, presenters of the US chat show The View were criticised for vacationing on the Bahamas following the overturning of Roe v. Wade, because of the restrictive abortion laws in the country.
