= Abortion in Mongolia =

Abortion is legal up to 22 weeks in Mongolia. Abortion was legalized in 1989.
