= Abortion in Tonga =

Abortion in Tonga is severely restricted by criminal law, as nearly all abortions are illegal. Abortions are illegal in Tonga, unless medical authorities cite preservation of maternal health.

== Tongan law ==
Abortion in Tonga is restricted by sections 103 to 105 of the Criminal Offences Act.

- Section 103 makes administering a drug or noxious thing or unlawfully using an instrument or using any other means with the intent to procure the miscarriage of any woman or girl an offence with a sentence of up to seven years imprisonment.
- Section 104 makes it an offence with imprisonment of up to three years for a woman or girl to take or permit to be administered to her any drug or other noxious thing or to use or permit to be used on herself any instrument or other means with intent to procure a miscarriage.
- Section 105 creates an offence with imprisonment of up to four years for anyone supplying or procuring any drug or other noxious thing or any instrument knowing they are to be used for the purpose of procuring a miscarriage.

In addition, the Tonga Extradition Act allows persons to be extradited to specified countries when they are charged in those countries with an offence relating to abortion.
