= Abortion in Brunei =

Abortion in Brunei is legal when performed to save a woman's life. A woman who induces her abortion faces up to seven years in prison. The penalty for someone who performs an abortion was 10–15 years.

In 2014, Brunei's government introduced Sharia criminal law, which punishes abortion with execution by stoning. This provision was initially set to take effect in 2016.

In 2016, a 22-year-old woman was sentenced to six months in prison for obtaining an abortion using the abortion pill, despite facing a maximum sentence of seven years.
