= Abortion in Papua New Guinea =

Abortion in Papua New Guinea is only legal if the abortion will save the mother's life. In Papua New Guinea, if an abortion is performed on a woman for any other reason, the violator is subject to fourteen years in prison. A woman who performs a self-induced abortion may be imprisoned for seven years.

Papua New Guinea law allows courts to take local customs and traditions into consideration in cases of abortion, so some medical practitioners in regions where local traditions allow abortion in cases of rape or incest may not face charges.
