= Abortion in Georgia (country) =

Abortion in Georgia is legal on request within the first 12 weeks of pregnancy. Between 12 and 22 weeks, abortions may be performed on medical grounds under conditions established by the Ministry of Health, Labour and Social Affairs. After 22 weeks, abortions additionally require approval of a three-member medical committee. The law governing abortion was instituted in 2000.

The abortion rate in Georgia dropped sharply during the 1990s, from 41.1 abortions per 1,000 women aged 15 to 44 in 1992 to 21.9 in 1996 and 19.1 in 2005. This decline has been attributed to increased use of modern contraceptives.

As of 2010, the abortion rate was 26.5 abortions per 1,000 women aged 15 to 44, among the highest rates in the world. By an alternate measure, however, abortion fell between 2005 and 2010: a 2005 study found that women in Georgia had on average 3.1 abortions in their lifetimes, then the highest rate in the world; by 2010, that statistic had fallen to 1.6 abortions.

A majority of Georgians oppose legal abortion. The 2013 Caucasus Barometer poll found that 69% of Georgians believe that abortion can never be justified. Public opinion polling by the Pew Research Center, released in May 2017, found that only 10% supported legal abortion in most or all cases.

A study of 2005–2009 data found a sex ratio at birth of 121 males for every 100 females, suggesting that sex-selective abortion may be occurring.

== See also ==
- Healthcare in Georgia (country)
- Secularism and irreligion in Georgia (country)
