= Abortion in Africa =

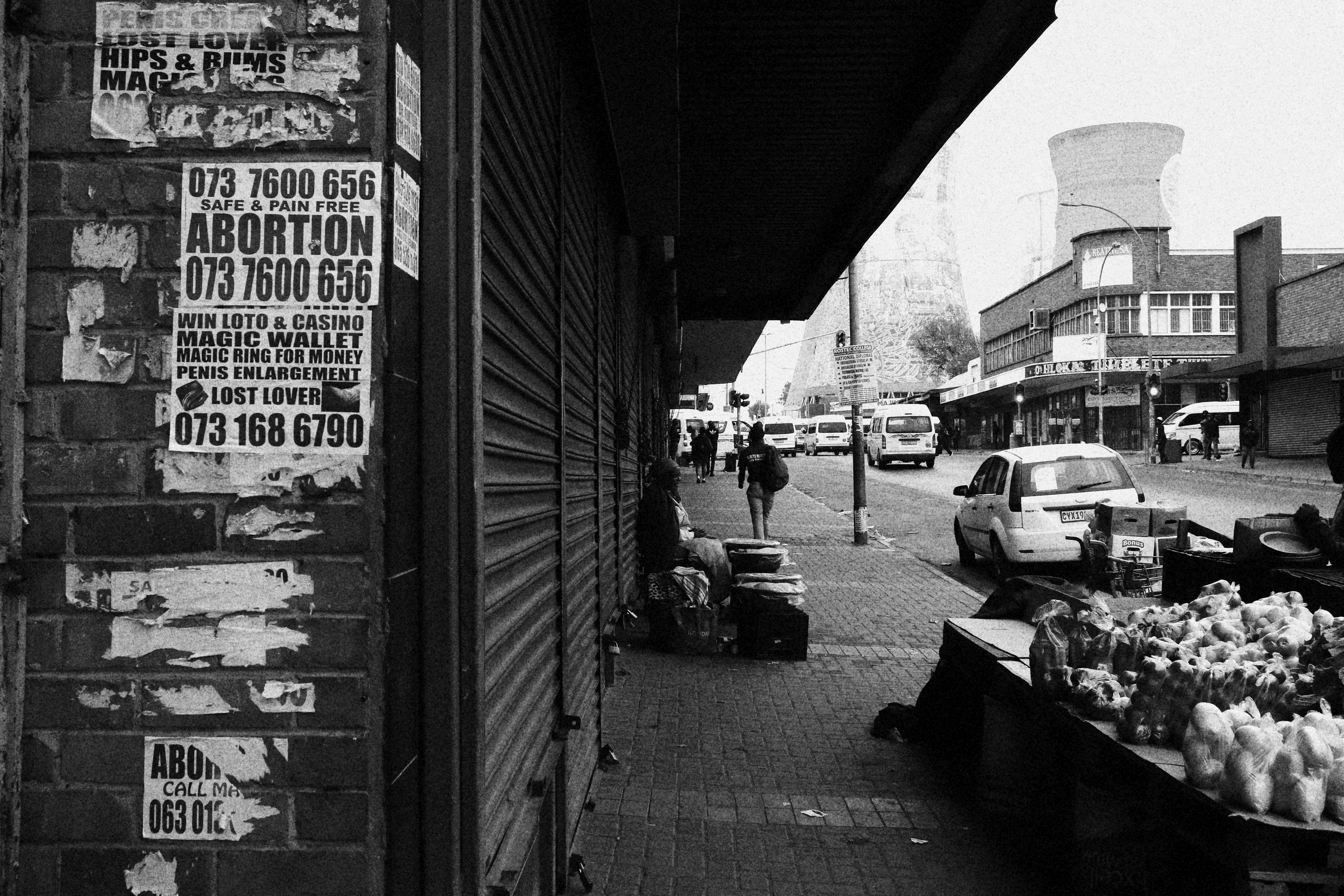
Flyers advertising illegal abortion clinics in Bloemfontein, South Africa

In Africa, abortion is subject to various national abortion laws. Most women in Africa live in countries with restrictive laws. Most countries in Africa are parties to the African Union's Maputo Protocol, the only international treaty that defines a right to abortion. Sub-Saharan Africa is the world region with the highest rates of unsafe abortions and abortion mortality. Most abortions in the region are unsafe. The region has the highest rate of unintended pregnancy, the primary motive for abortion. The most likely women to have abortions are young, unmarried, or urban. Post-abortion care is widely available.

Abortion-rights movements emphasize public health arguments about the maternal mortality rate. Anti-abortion movements argue that the practice of abortion was imposed upon Africa by foreign powers.

Many women keep abortions secret due to stigma. Medical abortion using misoprostol is available from health providers and pharmacies, and is usually safe. Surgical abortion is regulated by national guidelines in countries with legal abortion. Self-induced abortion is often unsafe. Traditional methods are common.

Abortion has existed in Africa since ancient times. Many bans on abortions were implemented during the colonial era. Since then, reproductive health laws, constitutional amendments, and judicial decisions have been passed to permit abortion under varying grounds. International treaties have influenced reform. United States policy has influenced the abortion debate.

== Legal status ==
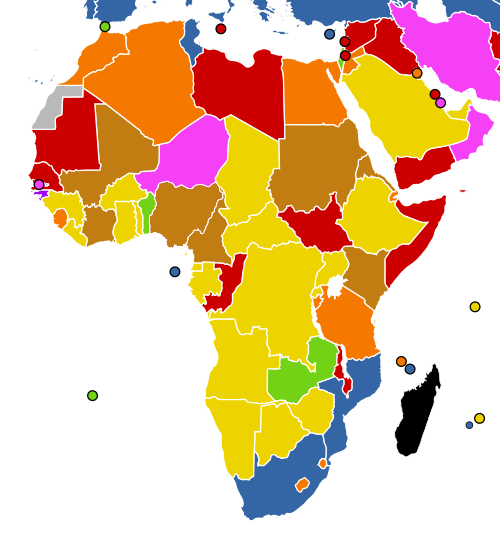
Legality of abortion by country or territory Legal on request: No gestational limit; Gestational limit after the first 17 weeks; Gestational limit in the first 17 weeks; Unclear gestational limit; Legally restricted to cases of: Risk to woman's life, to her health*, rape*, fetal impairment*, or socioeconomic factors; Risk to woman's life, to her health*, rape, or fetal impairment; Risk to woman's life, to her health*, or fetal impairment; Risk to woman's life*, to her health*, or rape; Risk to woman's life or to her health; Risk to woman's life; Illegal with no exceptions; No information; * Does not apply to some countries or territories in that category

Constitutions, judicial decisions, health codes, and laws may mention abortion. Many countries' reproductive health laws specify legal grounds for abortion, often following the terms of international laws. Guidelines and codes of medical ethics may describe implementation of the law or may be contradicted by the law. Most African countries where abortion is legal do not implement them in a way that makes abortion broadly available.

Abortion is unconditionally legal in Benin, Guinea-Bissau, Cape Verde, São Tomé and Príncipe, South Africa, and Tunisia. Zambia allows abortion for any health or socioeconomic reason. As of 2019, 45% of women of reproductive age in Sub-Saharan Africa live in countries with highly restrictive laws, 47% are under moderately restrictive laws, and 8% in countries where abortion is broadly legal. Some countries with restrictive laws apply them inclusively. Ethiopia uses a broad interpretation of its law. Ghana states that no evidence is needed to prove grounds for legal abortion.

In countries where abortion is conditionally legal, abortion is not accessible in practice due to complicated legal processes. Many women think abortion is illegal, regardless of whether it is. Those who think abortion is illegal are more likely to undergo unsafe treatments, fearing legal issues of seeking professional care. In Ghana, Zambia, and Kenya, most women do not know the laws legalising abortion. Medical providers may be uncomfortable providing abortions out of fear of anti-abortion backlash. In some countries, unclear laws deter them from providing abortion.

=== International law ===
The African Union's Maputo Protocol secures the right to abortion in the cases of rape, incest, or threat to the life or health of the pregnant woman. As of 2022, 42 out of 55 countries in Africa have signed it. Most countries in Africa have ratified the United Nations Convention on the Rights of the Child and African Charter on the Rights and Welfare of the Child, which provide a right to sexual and reproductive healthcare for minors. The Southern African Development Community has written policy frameworks to decriminalise abortion. Article 5 of its SADC Sexual and Reproductive Health Rights Strategy (2019–2030) aims to reduce unsafe abortion and teenage pregnancy rates.

== History ==
=== Pre-colonial era ===
From Ancient Egypt until the 15th century, women would consult a pharmacopoeia about herbs that worked as contraceptives or abortifacients. Abortion was practiced by over 400 cultures in pre-colonial Africa. The Malagasy people used it to limit the sizes of families. The Maasai people used it when women were impregnated by men who could not provide for the child. The Maasai and the Owambo people used it in cases of teenage pregnancy. The Efik people used it if they predicted birth defects. In South Africa, Cape Malays used red geraniums, Khoekhoe people used thorn bushes, and Zulu people used a shrub called uhlungughlungu.

=== Colonial era ===
Laws banning abortion are inherited from colonial powers. All of the countries that colonised Africa have since decriminalised abortion. Colonial abortion laws were based on laws developed by European governments in the 18th century—civil law of France, Belgium, and Portugal, common law of England, and, in the case of South Africa's law, the Roman-Dutch law system. Laws were influenced by Christian and Islamic law. Islamic societies often practiced abortion. Islamic schools had differing opinions of it.

=== Post-independence era ===
In 1985, Ghana legalised abortion under certain grounds. It reviewed the law in 2003 to develop a plan for implementation. In the 1990s, nearly three-quarters of emergency gynecological admissions in Africa were due to unsafe abortion. The rate of abortions resulting in hospitalisation was over two-thirds in Egypt and nearly one-quarter in Nigeria. Parties to the 1994 International Conference on Population and Development pledged to increase access to family planning services, safe and legal abortion, and post-abortion care, which influenced reforms in Africa. Before the conference, African governments had avoided the stigmatised topic of unsafe abortion.

In the late 1990s and early 2000s, post-abortion care (PAC) services were introduced in Egypt, Ethiopia, Ghana, Kenya, Malawi, Nigeria, Senegal, South Africa, Tanzania, Uganda, Zambia, and Zimbabwe. Ipas led the Woman-Centred Abortion Care program, which addressed the use of MVA and the availability of providers. South Africa decriminalised abortion in 1996 through a political coalition. The African National Congress noted that unsafe abortion had a disproportionate impact on Black South Africans. Between 1996 and 2003, Burkina Faso, Mali, Guinea, Niger, Chad, and Benin revised their strict abortion bans from the Napoleonic Code to allow abortion in the cases of rape, incest, and fetal impairment. In 2004, lawmakers debated abortion in Kenya. Senegal and Madagascar are the only Sub-Saharan countries that have passed reproductive health laws without specifying legal grounds for abortion, as of 2020.

=== Maputo Protocol ===
Participation in the Maputo Protocol Signed and ratified Acceded or succeeded Only signed Not signed Territories of non-AU states

The African Union's 2003 Maputo Protocol is the only human rights treaty that provides criteria for abortion. Article 14(2)(c) of the Protocol says:

2. States Parties shall take all appropriate measures to...
c) protect the reproductive rights of women by authorising medical abortion in cases of sexual assault, rape, incest, and where the continued pregnancy endangers the mental and physical health of the mother or the life of the mother or the foetus.

— Article 14 of the Protocol to the African Charter on Human and Peoples' Rights on the Rights of Women in Africa

The Maputo Plan of Action calls to "compile and disseminate data on the magnitude and consequences of unsafe abortion." Since the Maputo Protocol, 21 African countries have expanded their legal grounds for abortion. As of 2023, 44 member states have ratified the it, 8 have signed but not ratified it, and 3 have not signed it. Of those that have ratified it, 12 exceed its provisions, 11 fully comply with the provisions, 16 partially comply, and 4 do not comply. Few countries in North Africa signed the protocol until the 2010s.

Some legal scholars have criticized the Maputo Protocol for listing specific grounds to allow abortion. Others have argued that the continent's human rights guidelines provide for the complete legalisation of abortion. The African Commission on Human and Peoples' Rights (ACHPR) has said, "Women must not be subjected to criminal proceedings and should not incur any legal sanctions for having benefited from health services reserved to them, such as abortion and post-abortion care," and has called for countries to "immediately place a moratorium on the prosecution and detention of women who have illegal abortions." The ACHPR interprets that Articles 3 and 4 of the Protocol, which guarantee rights to respect and dignity, includes the right to make personal decisions without government involvement.

In the Democratic Republic of the Congo, Article 14 was enacted after a 2018 ruling by the Constitutional Court invoked an article saying national treaties take precedence over national law. It was the first country in Francophone Africa to expand legal abortion. In 2019, Rwanda, which had removed its reservation to the Maputo Protocol in 2012, implemented the WHO's definition of health, which provides for the terms of Article 14.

=== 21st century ===
Abortion laws were liberalised in Ethiopia in 2006 and Ghana in 2006 and 2012. In 2008, the ACHPR decided in Institute for Human Rights and Development in Africa v. Angola that the ban on cruel punishment extends to "lack of access to medicine or medical care." The following year, Nigeria became the first country in the world to include misoprostol for PAC in its essential medicines list.

In the Gambia, the Women's Act 2010 provides for safe abortion if there is a risk to the life of the mother or fetus. Kenya's 2010 constitution, passed by a referendum, permits abortion if there is risk to life or health. In 2012, São Tomé and Príncipe changed its penal code from completely banning abortion to allowing it without restriction, and Somalia authorised abortion in emergencies in its new constitution. The same year, Mauritius reformed its law, influenced by a Mauritian member of the Convention on the Elimination of All Forms of Discrimination against Women.

Planned Parenthood created legal networks to advocate for safe abortion in East Africa. The program began in 2011; in the following decade, it trained 75 lawyers and brought seven cases to court, all of which succeeded. The International Federation of Gynaecology and Obstetrics's Advocacy for Safe Abortion project, launched in 2019, has partnered with OB/GYN societies of African countries. The MAMA network has worked to expand access to self-managed abortion. Malawi proposed the Termination of Pregnancy Bill in July 2015, but legislators have not yet debated it, as of 2020. Sierra Leone's Safe Abortion Act was passed by its parliament in 2015 and 2016, but the president refused to sign it. In a 2015 joint statement, the United Nations, the Inter-American Commission on Human Rights, and the ACHPR said that criminalizing abortion is a form of gender discrimination. The ACHPR began a campaign for African governments to decriminalize abortion in 2016 and reiterated this goal in 2021.

The COVID-19 pandemic led to disruption in the supply chains of medical abortion and contraceptives. DKT International, a major provider of such products, ran low on its stock after manufacturing disruptions in Asia. MSI Reproductive Choices suspended its programs in Kenya and Uganda. Health workers predicted a rise in unsafe abortion cases.

==== Influence of United States policy ====
Several Presidents of the United States have instated the Mexico City policy, which bans federal funding for NGOs operating abroad from performing or advocating for abortion as family planning. It was introduced in 1984 by the administration of Ronald Reagan. Since then, Democratic presidents have rescinded the policy and Republican presidents have reinstated it. Organisations such as Planned Parenthood and Marie Stopes International have chosen to lose federal funding when it is in effect. The instatement of the policy by George W. Bush was strongly correlated with higher abortion rates in Sub-Saharan African countries affected by it. Countries that had lost more aid funding had higher pregnancy rates and lower contraceptive use than those less affected.

The United States overturned its right to abortion in the 2022 case Dobbs v. Jackson Women's Health Organization, which impacted the abortion debate in Africa. Abortion providers faced an increase in threats. American groups provided funding for anti-abortion activists. Anti-abortion groups in Kenya challenged the country's recent ruling that abortion is a constitutional right, which had cited Roe v. Wade. The governor of Lagos State, Nigeria, suspended guidelines for therapeutic abortion. Ethiopian groups such as the U.S.-based Family Watch International challenged its law legalizing abortion, and protestors gathered in Hawassa and Addis Ababa. Family Watch International held a meeting at Uganda's presidential office with delegates from 20 African countries. Its leader said in a speech in Malawi that it was combatting a "sexual social recolonization of Africa". Days after the ruling, Sierra Leone's president Julius Maada Bio announced his plan to protect abortion. Benin implemented one of Africa's most permissive abortion laws.

In 2023, Republican members of the United States House of Representatives defunded PEPFAR, a foreign aid plan that lowered rates of HIV/AIDS in Africa. It had previously had bipartisan support despite concerns about abortion. African aid recipients who lost funding included many abortion opponents. In September, 350 African religious leaders wrote that PEPFAR should be re-implemented and denied that it led to abortions.

According to reporting by the Center for Countering Digital Hate and MSI Reproductive Choices in March 2024, Meta and Google restricted abortion information in Africa, Latin America and Asia. MSI said that Google flagged the term "pregnancy options" and Facebook deleted its advertisements while allowing advertisements including misinformation related to abortion. Meta said it would review the claims and Google said it did not restrict the subject. Online barriers to information contributed to women in Africa not knowing about the legality of abortion.

== Prevalence ==
As of 2010–2014, Africa has an annual average of 8.2 million abortions, a rate of 34 per 1,000 women of reproductive age equating to a total of 41 million. The rate varies from 31 per 1,000 in Western Africa to 34 per 1,000 in Northern Africa. The ratio of pregnancies resulting in abortion is 15%. This percentage varies from 12% in Western Africa to 24% in Southern Africa. The abortion rate is the same in places where abortion is or is not permitted. Sub-Saharan Africa is the region with the most unsafe abortions. As of 2024, 77% of abortions are unsafe and nearly half are least safe, as classified by the World Health Organization (WHO). Doctors Without Borders estimated in 2023 that abortions in hospitals in poor or conflict-affected places are five to seven times more likely to lead to serious complications.

As of 2014, 9% of maternal deaths in Africa (16,000 deaths) were caused by abortions. Sub-Saharan Africa has the highest rate of abortions resulting in deaths, at 185 per 100,000, as of 2019. The rate has gone down from 315 per 100,000 in 2010. The highest fatality rate is in Middle Africa and the lowest is in Southern Africa, where most abortions are legal. The most commonly treated complication of abortion is haemorrhage. About 10% of women treated for abortion complications have infections. The abortion mortality rate is higher among women who have infections.

=== Societal factors ===
Unintended pregnancies cause the overwhelming majority of abortions. Sub-Saharan Africa has the world's highest unintended pregnancy rate. As of 2017, the continent's unintended pregnancy rate is 89 per 1,000 women of reproductive age. Of the 21.6 million unintended pregnancies annually, 38% result in abortion. About 58 million women have an unmet need for contraception. As of 2019, the rate of use of modern contraceptives is 29% among married women, which has tripled since 1990. Though Sub-Saharan Africa has the highest average desired fertility, the desire for large families is declining. Sexually active unmarried women have higher-than-average rates of modern contraceptive use than married women, but are more likely to not want to be pregnant, so they have more unmet need for contraception.

Demographics of women who are more likely to receive abortions are those who are young, are unmarried, are in school, do not have children, live in cities, are better educated, and are wealthier. Reasons for seeking abortions include wanting to delay being a mother, being unmarried, family honor, financial pressure, and wanting to continue education. Women who have experienced intimate partner violence are more likely to have abortions.

The abortion rate is 26 per 1,000 for married women and 36 per 1,000 for unmarried women. Premarital pregnancy is stigmatised, so unmarried women often want to terminate their pregnancies. Sexually active adolescents have much higher rates of abortion than the average. Unmet need for contraception causes 86% of unintended pregnancies among Sub-Saharan adolescents. Some adolescents cannot afford birth control or fear stigma from providers. Adolescents have higher rates of abortion in all African regions. Adolescents, especially students, have knowledge of abortion services but do not use them due to the cost and stigma. Though international treaties guarantee the medical autonomy of minors, many African countries' laws do not guarantee access to abortion for minors.

Abortion rates are higher in cities, where services and providers are concentrated. Urban women have lower rates of unintended pregnancy, due to higher contraceptive use; however, they are more want fewer children or to have higher agency. Sub-Saharan Africa has few trained medical professionals, especially in rural areas, where 60% of the population lives. Laws requiring abortion to be authorised by medical professionals are difficult to adhere to. The option for conscientious objection limits the number of doctors who can perform abortions. Male partners of women who have abortions may be involved through financial or emotional support. Some men avoid involvement due to denial of responsibility or suspicion of promiscuity, and some women do not tell their partners as they fear lack of support. Those who are involved may decide the method of abortion.

== Debate ==
=== Pro-abortion ===
Feminist activists advocate for more permissive abortion laws. Public health frameworks, emphasising the rates of morbidity and mortality from unsafe abortion, are effective. These frameworks often do not address psychological effects of unsafe abortion. The "pro-choice" argument is popular in the Western world, but less effective in Africa. African feminists criticise this stance for focusing on choice regarding abortion rather than other factors of women's sexual and reproductive experiences. The framework of reproductive justice has been proposed to be relevant to African experiences. International organisations such as the Center for Reproductive Rights work to establish safe, legal abortion in Africa.

=== Anti-abortion ===
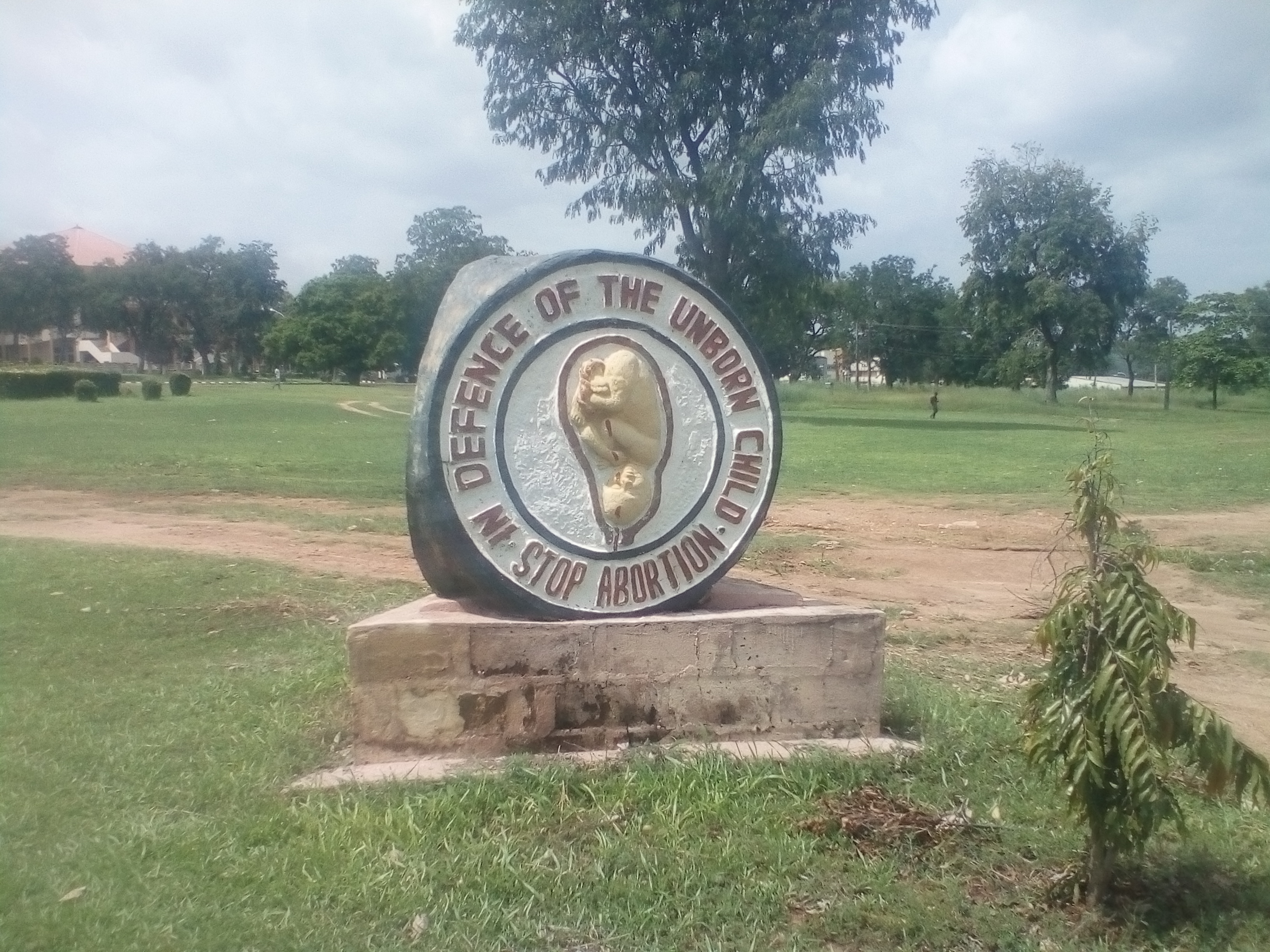
An anti-abortion sculpture in Nigeria

A 2024 survey found that over half of people in South Africa and about 90% in Kenya and Nigeria oppose legal abortion. People in rural South Africa view abortion as a form of killing that violated traditional values. Men in Kenya view abortion as a way for women to hide culturally deviant behavior. A decolonisation framework is common, which argues that abortion has been imposed on Africa by colonial powers. The argument is based on the fact that American organisations lead advocacy efforts for legal abortion in Africa. Postcolonial theorists have criticised this philosophy for presenting a homogenous view of African culture.

== Methods ==
Little data exists on methods of abortion. Some abortion patients do not know what methods they use. Lack of knowledge causes women to obtain unsafe abortions or face delays that limit their options. Women who are older, less educated, in rural areas, or do not know health workers are less likely to have adequate knowledge of abortion. Social networks influence women's decisions about abortion. Many women make multiple attempts at abortions, as they seek out professional services after inexpensive methods often fail. This delays the final procedure, which leads to higher risk. Women often keep abortions secret. They may opt for folk remedies over formal services. Women and girls in rural areas are more likely to use traditional methods. Abortions outside of the formal health system are more likely to cause complications. Though women wish for safe abortions, fears of legal and social repercussions may lead to more unsafe abortions. Some women who know about safe methods cannot afford them.

Countries with legal abortion have implemented guidelines from international medical standards and offer abortions in public facilities. Post-abortion care is always legal and obligated by medical ethics. Abortion providers use coded language in their advertising to avoid objections. Religious NGOs are a major source of abortion care but are more likely to choose conscientious objection. Many surgical abortions use dilation and curettage, a method that is not recommended by the WHO.

Legal restrictions and social stigma lead to women getting clandestine abortions or self-induced abortions. Methods of ineffective abortions include ingesting herbal remedies, caustics, or store-bought products falsely believed to induce abortions; using over-the-counter drugs in large quantities; or inserting cassava sticks, metal objects, or branches into the vagina. Safe self-managed abortion is considered a possible safe option by the WHO. In Africa, people who receive or provide self-managed abortions may face prosecution or stigma.

=== Medical abortion ===
The widespread use of misoprostol for medical abortions has made abortions safer. It has been available in the region since 2005, when the WHO added it to its list of its list of essential medicines, off of which many African countries base their guidelines. The WHO recommends a procedure of mifepristone followed by misoprostol, or use of only the latter if the former is unavailable. Mifepristone is more expensive and has fewer uses than misoprostol, so it is not widely available.

Many women purchase misoprostol without prescriptions. Pharmacies are a preferred source for healthcare as they are accessible and affordable. Some providers clandestinely offer misoprostol pills which may be expired or adulterated or not contain enough of the active ingredient to be effective. Many women lack information about how to use misoprostol. Knowledge of mifepristone and misoprostol is higher in younger women. Providers and clients in several countries widely approve of medical abortion as it can be done privately, is more accessible and affordable than other methods, and is considered safe and painless. Access to medical abortion may lessen the stigma of abortion. Implementing misoprostol at lower-level health centers has been shown to be effective. It may lead to lower rates of unsafe abortion with a lower need for physicians and resources.

== Post-abortion care ==
In Sub-Saharan Africa, an average of 1.7 million women per year receive post-abortion care (PAC). National average annual rates range from 4–7 per 1,000 women in Nigeria to about 15 per 1,000 women in Uganda. PAC patients may be treated as inpatients or outpatients depending on the severity of their cases and national guidelines. PAC is provided by varied professionals at public and private providers. In some countries, nurses and clinical officers have been shown to treat abortion as well as physicians. PAC services are concentrated in urban facilities owned by the government or NGOs and referral hospitals. In countries where abortion is illegal, many patients have their abortions recorded as miscarriages.

About 44% of abortions require care for complications or incompleteness. Of women who require treatment, 43% do not receive it. These rates are highest among poor rural women and lowest among non-poor urban women. Severe complications are more likely to occur in later stages of pregnancy. In Southern Africa, where abortion is widely legal, there are fewer cases of treatment of abortion complications. Young and unmarried women comprise large proportions of PAC patients in Sub-Saharan Africa. Statistics vary by country. PAC patients comprise large proportions of adolescents receiving gynecological care.

Delayed or deficient PAC is a major factor in abortion mortality. Many women delay PAC because they expect the problem to be go away, lack the money or transportation, or fear social consequences or arrest. Most arrests for abortion are initiated by healthcare providers. Some PAC providers refuse care or demand bribes. Delays occur after women seek treatment, as local health centers lack the training or equipment and must make referrals to higher-level facilities. Patients in rural areas face delays since services are more available in cities. Many providers lack adequate training in PAC methods, violate standards, and perform unsafe procedures. Some national abortion laws are unclear about PAC.

WHO standards recommend manual vacuum aspiration (MVA) or misoprostol for PAC. Use of misoprostol leads to higher safety, as misoprostol can be easily purchased, stored, and used, and it can be stocked in primary care facilities. Many places continue to use dilation and curettage (D&C), a surgical method not recommended by WHO. Sublingual administration of misoprostol is effective and accepted in many African countries. Post-abortion family planning services effectively inform patients of options such as long-acting reversible contraceptives. These services increase the use of effective contraception. The most common contraceptives offered are injectables, oral contraceptive pills, condoms, and intrauterine devices. Many PAC providers do not offer family planning services.

The annual spending on PAC in Sub-Saharan Africa is $228 million, as of 2019. Costs to national health systems vary based on population, unsafe abortion rate, and provisions for care in primary and secondary facilities. Less expensive abortions result in more expensive PAC. The costs to the healthcare systems of PAC are greater than the costs of safe abortion. Stigma about abortion and unawareness of PAC among medical workers contribute to low availability. As of 2018, PAC is offered by fewer than 10% of primary care facilities in Kenya, Namibia, Rwanda, Tanzania and Uganda. Training and intervention programs are effective in expanding access, reducing delays, and improving midwives' and nurses' willingness and ability to provide PAC. Rollout of misoprostol, community health education, and community partnerships have been shown to increase access to PAC in many countries. PAC is less available in countries where abortion is illegal. Scholars have criticized metrics of PAC use for overlooking the harm caused by illegal abortion.

== Abortion laws by jurisdiction ==
Legend
permitted	In many cases, abortion is permitted only up to a certain gestational age. If this limit is known and does not vary by subdivision, it is shown instead of "permitted".
permitted, with complex legality or practice	In many cases, abortion is permitted only up to a certain gestational age. If this limit is known and does not vary by subdivision, it is shown instead of "permitted".
varies by subdivision
prohibited, with complex legality or practice
prohibited
unknown or unclear

=== Countries ===
The table below summarises the legal grounds for abortion in all African Member states of the United Nations. This table is mostly based on data compiled by the United Nations up to 2019, with some updates, additions and clarifications citing other sources.

Legal grounds on which abortion is permitted in independent countries
Country	Risk to life	Risk to health	Rape	Fetal impairment	Economic or social	On request
Algeria	permitted	permitted	prohibited	prohibited	prohibited	prohibited
Angola (Note: The UN source incorrectly shows Angola as allowing abortion on request, citing a penal code draft from 2014 that did not become law. The version of the penal code enacted in 2020 and entered into force in 2021 allows abortion only in certain circumstances.)	permitted	permitted	16 weeks	permitted	prohibited	prohibited
Benin	permitted	permitted	permitted	permitted	12 weeks	prohibited
Botswana	16 weeks	16 weeks	16 weeks	16 weeks	prohibited	prohibited
Burkina Faso	no limit	no limit	14 weeks	no limit	prohibited	prohibited
Burundi	permitted	permitted	prohibited	prohibited	prohibited (Note: The penal code says that social demands are taken into account in a conviction for abortion. It is unclear if this circumstance reduces the penalty or may remove it.)	prohibited
Cameroon	permitted	28 weeks	28 weeks	prohibited	prohibited	prohibited
Cape Verde	no limit	no limit	12 weeks	permitted	12 weeks	12 weeks
Central African Republic	8 weeks	prohibited (Note: The penal code says that abortion may be permitted to an underage woman in a state of grave distress up to 8 weeks.)	8 weeks	8 weeks	prohibited	prohibited
Chad	permitted	permitted	permitted	permitted	prohibited	prohibited
Comoros	permitted	permitted	prohibited	prohibited	prohibited	prohibited
Republic of the Congo	permitted (Note: This ground is not explicitly mentioned in the law. The Charter of Rights and Freedoms, which is declared to be an integral part of the constitution, says that "Abortion, other than therapeutic, is prohibited and punishable by law." It is unclear whether the therapeutic ground means only to save the woman's life or also to preserve her health. The UN source says that only the ground to save the woman's life is accepted as a general legal principle.)	prohibited	prohibited	prohibited	prohibited	prohibited
Democratic Republic of the Congo	permitted (Note: This ground is not explicitly mentioned in the law but it is accepted as a general legal principle, allowed by regulation and established by treaty.)	permitted (Note: This ground is not explicitly mentioned in the law but it is established by treaty, whose application is requested by the Constitutional Court.)	permitted	permitted	prohibited	prohibited
Djibouti	permitted	permitted (Note: The penal code says that abortion is permitted for therapeutic purposes but is unclear whether it means only to save the woman's life or also to preserve her health. The UN source marks it as a permitted ground.)	prohibited	prohibited	prohibited	prohibited
Egypt	permitted	permitted	prohibited	prohibited	prohibited	prohibited
Equatorial Guinea	12 weeks	12 weeks	12 weeks	12 weeks	prohibited	prohibited
Eritrea	permitted	permitted	permitted	prohibited (Note: Abortion is permitted if the woman is under age 18.)	prohibited	prohibited
Eswatini	permitted	permitted	permitted	permitted	prohibited	prohibited
Country	Risk to life	Risk to health	Rape	Fetal impairment	Economic or social	On request
Ethiopia	28 weeks	28 weeks	28 weeks	28 weeks	prohibited (Note: Permitted up to 28 weeks of gestation if the woman is unfit to raise the child due to a physical or mental disability or for being under age 18. The penalty for abortion may be mitigated in case of extreme poverty.)	prohibited
Gabon	10 weeks	prohibited (Note: The penal code says that abortion may be permitted to an underage woman in a state of grave distress up to 10 weeks.)	10 weeks	10 weeks	prohibited	prohibited
Gambia	permitted	prohibited	prohibited	permitted	prohibited	prohibited
Ghana	28 weeks	28 weeks	28 weeks	28 weeks	prohibited	prohibited
Guinea	permitted	permitted	permitted	permitted	prohibited	prohibited
Guinea-Bissau	permitted	permitted	permitted	permitted	permitted	permitted
Ivory Coast	permitted	permitted	permitted	prohibited (Note: The UN source marks it as a legal ground but it is only established by treaty, not by law and not implemented as of 2020.)	prohibited	prohibited
Kenya	permitted	permitted	permitted (Note: This ground is not explicitly mentioned in the law but it is established by judicial decision. It is also mentioned in the National Guidelines on Management of Sexual Violence.)	prohibited	prohibited	prohibited
Lesotho	permitted	permitted	permitted	permitted	prohibited	prohibited
Liberia	24 weeks	24 weeks	24 weeks	24 weeks	prohibited	prohibited
Libya	permitted	prohibited	prohibited	prohibited	prohibited	prohibited
Madagascar	prohibited (Note: This ground is not explicitly mentioned in the law. The UN source says that it is accepted as a general legal principle, but other sources say that abortion is not legally allowed under any circumstance in Madagascar.)	prohibited	prohibited	prohibited	prohibited	prohibited
Malawi	permitted	prohibited	prohibited	prohibited	prohibited	prohibited
Mali	permitted	permitted	permitted	prohibited	prohibited	prohibited
Mauritania	permitted (Note: The penal code prohibits abortion without any explicit exception, but the UN source says that abortion to save the woman's life is permitted as a general legal principle. The law on child protection prohibits abortion except for a "proven medical need", and the law on reproductive health prohibits abortion except in case of risk to the woman's life. The government has stated that the law of the country permits abortion on therapeutic grounds.)	prohibited	prohibited	prohibited	prohibited	prohibited
Mauritius	no limit	no limit	14 weeks	no limit	prohibited	prohibited
Morocco (Note: In 2016, the government of Morocco proposed allowing abortion in cases of rape, incest, mental disability and fetal impairment. However, the parliament did not approve the proposal, and as of 2021 the abortion articles in the penal code remain unchanged.)	no limit	permitted	prohibited	prohibited	prohibited	prohibited
Mozambique	no limit	no limit	16 weeks	24 weeks (Note: May be permitted with no gestational limit in case the fetus is not viable.)	12 weeks	12 weeks
Country	Risk to life	Risk to health	Rape	Fetal impairment	Economic or social	On request
Namibia	permitted	permitted	permitted	permitted	prohibited	prohibited
Niger	permitted	permitted	prohibited	permitted	prohibited	prohibited
Nigeria	permitted	prohibited (Note: The Criminal Code of the predecessor of Nigeria prohibited abortion except to save the woman's life. A judicial decision on a similar law in the parent country allowed abortion also to preserve the woman's health, but the West African Court of Appeal, despite applying the reasoning of the parent country's decision, affirmed only the ground to save the woman's life in Nigerian law. The Criminal Code and its judicial precedent remain in force in the southern states of Nigeria. In the states corresponding to the former Northern Region, the Penal Code replaced the Criminal Code and its judicial precedent, and it also prohibits abortion except to save the woman's life.)	prohibited	prohibited	prohibited	prohibited
Rwanda	no limit	no limit	22 weeks	no limit	prohibited	prohibited
São Tomé and Príncipe	no limit	no limit	no limit	16 weeks	12 weeks	12 weeks
Senegal	permitted (Note: The penal code prohibits abortion without any explicit exception, but the code of medical ethics permits abortion to save the woman's life. The government has stated that abortion is authorised in case of risk to the woman's health.)	prohibited	prohibited	prohibited	prohibited	prohibited
Seychelles	12 weeks (Note: In some cases, abortion may be allowed up to fetal viability or 26 weeks of gestation.)	12 weeks	12 weeks	12 weeks	prohibited	prohibited
Sierra Leone	permitted (Note: Sierra Leone established that the laws in force in England in 1880 would be in force in Sierra Leone from 1965. One of these laws prohibited abortion done "unlawfully" without defining it. A judicial decision in England in 1938 clarified that this law always implicitly allowed abortion at least to save the woman's life, and the decision allowed it also to preserve her health. It is unclear whether Sierra Leone applies only the original legal principle or also the judicial decision. In 2015 the parliament of Sierra Leone passed a law allowing abortion on request but it was not signed by the president so it did not come into force.)	permitted	prohibited	prohibited	prohibited	prohibited
Somalia	permitted (Note: This ground is not explicitly mentioned in the law but it is accepted as a general legal principle.)	prohibited	prohibited	prohibited	prohibited	prohibited
South Africa	no limit	20 weeks	20 weeks	no limit	20 weeks	12 weeks
South Sudan	permitted	prohibited	prohibited	prohibited	prohibited	prohibited
Sudan	no limit	prohibited	90 days (Note: From conception.)	prohibited	prohibited	prohibited
Tanzania (Note: In mainland Tanzania, articles 150 to 152 of the penal code prohibit abortion done "unlawfully", and article 230 of the same law permits abortion to preserve the woman's life. Article 219 additionally prohibits "child destruction", meaning abortion after fetal viability, presumed at 28 weeks of pregnancy, but still permits it to preserve the woman's life. In Zanzibar, the penal act has equivalent articles 129 to 131, 213 and 200.)	no limit	permitted (Note: This ground is not explicitly mentioned in the law. A judicial decision by the East African Court of Appeal, with jurisdiction over the predecessors of Tanzania, allowed abortion also to preserve the woman's health, and sources state that this decision remains binding after independence.)	prohibited	prohibited	prohibited	prohibited
Togo	permitted	permitted	permitted	permitted	prohibited	prohibited
Tunisia	no limit	no limit	3 months	no limit	3 months	3 months
Uganda	28 weeks	28 weeks	28 weeks	28 weeks	prohibited	prohibited
Zambia	permitted	permitted	permitted	permitted	permitted	prohibited
Zimbabwe	22 weeks	22 weeks	22 weeks (Note: Abortion is not permitted for rape within marriage.)	22 weeks	prohibited (Note: The 2014 Guidelines for Comprehensive Abortion Care says "In Zimbabwe termination of pregnancy may be permitted for HIV-positive women if they choose to do so.")	prohibited

=== Partially recognised states ===
The table below summarises the legal grounds for abortion in African states with limited recognition.

Legal grounds on which abortion is permitted in partially recognised states
Country	Risk to life	Risk to health	Rape	Fetal impairment	Economic or social	On request
Western Sahara	Unknown	Unknown	Unknown	Unknown	Unknown	Unknown
Somaliland	permitted	prohibited	prohibited	prohibited	prohibited	prohibited

=== Autonomous jurisdictions ===
The table below summarizes the legal grounds for abortion in African dependent territories of countries outside of Africa.

Legal grounds on which abortion is permitted in other autonomous jurisdictions
Jurisdiction	Risk to life	Risk to health	Rape	Fetal impairment	Economic or social	On request
Mayotte / Réunion	no limit	no limit	16 weeks (Note: Defined as 14 weeks of pregnancy, considered as 16 weeks from the last menstrual period.)	no limit	16 weeks	16 weeks
Saint Helena, Ascension and Tristan da Cunha (Note: Applies English law in force on 1 January 2006 unless locally modified, in each part of the territory. Tristan da Cunha explicitly applies the abortion law of the United Kingdom with minor modifications.)	no limit	no limit	permitted (Note: This ground is not explicitly mentioned in the law but it is considered to be included in a ground for preserving physical or mental health.)	no limit	24 weeks	prohibited

== See also ==
- Abortion debate
- Abortion in Europe
- Human rights in Africa
