= Abortion in Eritrea =

In Eritrea, abortion is banned except on the grounds of pregnancy from rape or incest, pregnancy of a minor, or risk to physical or mental health. Legal abortions require medical or judicial approval. Prior to Eritrea's independence, it applied Ethiopia's abortion law of the 1950s, which banned abortion unless life-saving. After independence, the 1991 penal code adapted this law to lift punishments on abortions on the grounds of rape, incest, or risk to life or health, but legal abortions did not exist in effect. The penal codes of 2001 and 2015 required physicians to prove health grounds for abortion. Unsafe abortion is common and contributes to maternal mortality in Eritrea. Post-abortion care is unavailable in some regions.

== Legislation ==
Article 283 of the 2015 penal code of Eritrea states that abortion is only legal if done to preserve the physical or mental health of the mother, if the pregnancy resulted from rape or incest, or if a minor is pregnant. The approval of a physician is required if done to preserve health, and a judicial ruling is required in the case of rape.

Article 282 of the penal code sets a prison sentence of 1 to 3 years for self-inducing an abortion, or 3 to 5 years for performing an abortion. Article 281 also criminalizes forced abortion, with a prison sentence of 7 to 10 years. Prosecution of abortion cases requires proof of pregnancy, though, as of 2005, the definition of pregnancy is not specified in law and thus relies on the opinions of judges.

== History ==
Traditionally, the Kunama and Nara people did not punish women for abortion or infanticide as, under their matrilineal legal systems, the punishment of a crime against a baby was a right reserved by the mother. The patrilineal systems of the Eritrean Highlands similarly enabled the father of a fetus to conduct an abortion, unless it was done by poisoning, which was a crime against the mother.

Upon the establishment of the Federation of Ethiopia and Eritrea in the 1950s, the Ethiopian Penal Code was modeled after the Swiss Criminal Code, so Ethiopia's abortion law was based on Swiss abortion law, which had been influenced by that of France. This banned abortion unless done to save a life. The Eritrean People's Liberation Front also banned abortion despite its support of premarital sex and contraception.

After independence in 1991, the transitional penal code of Eritrea retained much of the previous code but Article 534 was amended to say, "termination of pregnancy is not punishable where it is done to save the pregnant woman from grave and permanent damage to life or health, or on account of a grave state of physical or mental distress, or if the pregnancy is a result of rape or incest". The wording of "not punishable" (Tigrinya: "ayeQitsiEn iyu") led to ambiguity as to whether the law decriminalized certain abortions or merely removed criminal sentences. As Eritrean law distinguished between acts that were lawful, justifiable, or excusable, the ambiguous wording caused health workers and law enforcement to consider such abortions excusable, whereas scholar Philippe Graven considered them lawful. The code also retained two subarticles whose phrasing only permitted life-saving abortions. Furthermore, unlike the previous penal code, it did not have guidelines on the implementation of legal grounds for abortion and did not enable the Ministry of Health to create such guidelines. Legal abortions did not occur in practice as medical providers had no experience intervening in such cases and lacked the necessary technology.

During the drafting of a new penal code, which took place from 1997 to 2001, the abortion law was controversial, with the representative of the Women's Union arguing for legal abortion in all cases. After a first draft that would have provided for the establishment of health regulations for legal abortions, the finalized penal code permitted abortions if approved by a physician and performed at a licensed facility. Abortion guidelines had not been established by 2015.

== Prevalence ==
In 2015–2019, the estimated annual incidence of abortion was 16,500, equating to 40% of unintended pregnancies or 11% of all pregnancies. The abortion rate had stayed stagnant since 1990–1994, during which time the unintended pregnancy rate had decreased by 34%. According to the national Demographic and Health Surveys—which did not distinguish between abortion and miscarriage—termination of pregnancy was reported by 13% of women in 1995 and 10% of women in 2002. Abortion is stigmatized in the country, which may result in underreporting. According to Ann K. Blanc in 2004, up to half of all reported miscarriages may actually be abortions from non-medical providers.

Unsafe abortion is common in Eritrea. A 2002 report by the Ministry of Health found it to be the second-most common cause of treatment in medical facilities; it ranked as the second- or third-most common cause every year between 1999 and 2004. A 2008 health survey found that abortion caused 45.6% of obstetric complications treated in Eritrean health facilities, as well as 19.5% of maternal deaths. The country had a low use of family planning, contributing to the abortion rate. Post-abortion care (PAC) is often unavailable in the country due to scarcity of health workers and of lower-level facilities. Some women have to travel to different provinces for PAC services.

== See also ==
- Abortion in Africa
- Health in Eritrea
- Human rights in Eritrea
