= Abortion in Togo =

In Togo, abortion is only legal in cases of pregnancy from rape or incest, risk to the mother's health or life, or risk of birth defects. The law requires abortion to be performed by a doctor. Unsafe abortion is a major cause of maternal mortality in the country.

Togo inherited France's abortion law in 1920, banning abortion. The country's 1981 criminal code did not include the abortion ban, but access did not increase. Reproductive rights organizations have worked to raise awareness of abortion. After ratifying the Maputo Protocol in 2005, Togo passed a law legalizing abortion in December 2006. It was the first country in Francophone Africa to do so.

Access to abortion is low due to stigma, lack of knowledge, and lack of doctors. Some women travel to receive legal abortions in Benin. Abortion is particularly frequent in Lomé, where it is more common among younger women, and it is also frequent among sex workers. Illegal vendors provide abortion drugs. Post-abortion care has been available in hospitals since the 2000s, though barriers to access exist.

== Legislation ==
A 2006 reproductive health law says, "The voluntary interruption of pregnancy is only authorised when prescribed by a doctor and on request of the woman in cases where the pregnancy is the result of rape or of an incestuous relationship [or] if there is a strong risk that the unborn child will by affected by a particularly serious medical condition." The reproductive health law requires that abortions be performed at approved facilities with the approval of three physicians. The penal code of Togo otherwise criminalizes abortion. Abortions without medical prescriptions are punishable up to ten years in prison or fines between 500,000 and 3 million CFA francs, which apply to both the provider and the patient.

== History ==
When Togo gained independence, it inherited the French Penal Code of 1810, which banned abortion. A French law from 31 July 1920 banned abortion unless it threatened the life of the mother and banned the promotion of birth control. When Togo re-enacted its criminal code in 1981, it omitted mentions of abortion with the intent to remove the ban. By 1990, lifting abortion restrictions had not increased the availability of services. On 16 May 1984, a law banned providing an abortion to a girl enrolled in school.

In October 2005, Togo ratified the Maputo Protocol, which provides for a right to abortion under certain grounds. On 22 December 2006, the National Assembly accepted the law legalizing abortion. The law had 46 articles, including legalization of medical assistance in contraception. Togo was one of the first countries in Africa to legalize abortion in the case of rape and the first Sub-Saharan Francophone to reform its abortion law. Women's rights organizations influenced the law reform. The Episcopal Conference of Togo opposed the law, saying "It punishes the innocent: the unborn child."

In countries including Togo, U.S.–linked anti-abortion groups have set up centers disseminating misinformation related to abortion in the 2020s. In 2024, the non-governmental organization L'Association Togolaise pour le Bien-être Familial (ATBFE, transl. Togolese Association for Family Well-Being), which has worked in sexual and reproductive health since 1975, worked with journalists to raise awareness of abortion.

== Prevalence ==
In 2015–2019, Togo had 60,300 abortions per year. Between 1990–1994 and 2015–2019, Togo's rate of unintended pregnancy decreased 26%, while the abortion rate remained level. Legal issues and social taboos lead to low access to abortion. Abortions must legally be prescribed by a doctor, which is a limitation as the country has few doctors. Knowledge of the abortion law is low. Women who cannot access abortion in Togo may travel to Benin, where it is legal.

Medical abortion is commonly available from unsafe providers, who sell on the street. Drugs such as paracetamol, acetylsalicylic acid, quinine, chloroquine, and indomethacin are used. Usage is high among women who are young or unmarried. Illegal abortions may also be performed surgically in unsanitary conditions. Unsafe abortions are the largest cause of maternal mortality in the country.

Lomé has undergone an increase in abortion, similar to other African cities. As of 2016, 32.4% of women in the city who have ever been pregnant reported having abortions, and 43.2% of people know someone who has had an abortion. Almost 40% of abortions are performed in hospitals, 14.9% are by doctors, 36% are performed at home, and 17.9% are induced with drugs. Abortion rates are highest among Kabye people and Catholics. Abortion is a factor in the reduction of birth rates in the city. From 1988 to 1998, the city's abortion rates rose from about 12.2 to 62.2 per 1,000 women, with younger women being more likely to have abortions. A 2024 study of sex workers in Lomé and Kara found that 40% had ever had abortions and that Lomé had a higher rate. Sex workers in Lomé are more likely to experience stigma if they have had abortions.

=== Post-abortion care ===
The cost of post-abortion care (PAC) is between US$18 and $20, as of 2016. Though manual vacuum aspiration (MVA) is the recommended treatment method, many facilities lack equipment and training for it and instead use manual removal. Facilities offer post-abortion contraceptives for an additional fee. Most patients opt for oral contraceptive pills. Some facilities face shortages of supplies. Many PAC patients are young. Barriers to PAC for adolescents include lack of provisions for young patients, high cost, and poor organization leading to low privacy.

In 2004, ATBFE began an experiment providing free post-abortion care kits to poor women in two hospitals. Decentralized PAC services were introduced in 2006. The United States Agency for International Development (USAID) launched the Virtual Fostering Change Program in 2008 to assess and improve PAC services in Togo, Burkina Faso, Guinea, and Senegal. In 2014, the USAID-funded Evidence to Action project began working with the Division of Family Health to increase access to post-abortion family planning. After the program trained health providers, clinics widely began distributing free contraceptives, and the country incorporated the program's recommendations into its PAC guidelines. PAC providers involved in the program had higher knowledge and more positive attitudes about providing PAC for young people. In 2017, Togo updated its national family planning policies based on the recommendations.

== See also ==
- Human rights in Togo
