= Abortion in Somalia =

In Somalia, abortion is illegal except in cases permitted by sharia law, such as risk to life. The 2012 Constitution of Somalia is one of three constitutions to include an abortion ban. The colonial-era Italian abortion law, as well as the 1962 penal code of Somalia, also permitted only life-saving abortions. Abortions in the country are typically unsafe, which contributes to the country's maternal mortality rate, which is one of the highest in the world. Abortions are commonly self-induced or performed by illegal providers known as xaqitaan, which are active in Mogadishu. Post-abortion care in the country is inadequate, though it is protected by the government of Somalia and the semi-autonomous government of Puntland. Societal views on abortion commonly view it as forbidden or say that it should be dealt with by families rather than health providers.

== Legislation ==
Abortion laws in the 2012 Constitution of Somalia are based on the 1962 penal code. The constitution bans abortion but says abortions are not punishable if the pregnancy threatens the life of the mother or in other unspecified "cases of necessity". As the sharia is one of the three bases of Somalia's legal system, the interpretation of sharia law is the basis of the abortion law. While the sharia law applied in the country permits abortions up to three days after a rape, there is no universal sharia stance on abortion, leading to inconsistent interpretation.

Article 419 of the penal code of Somalia says receiving or performing an illegal abortion is punishable by a prison sentence of 1 to 5 years. Under Article 421, this sentence is increased to 3 to 8 years if the abortion causes harm, or 10 to 15 years if it causes death. Forced abortion is punishable by 3 to 7 years under Article 418. Article 420 also prohibits "instigating" an abortion, with a sentence of 6 months to 2 years.

Somalia is one of three countries with a constitutional provision banning abortion, as of 2017, together with Kenya and Eswatini. Unlike the other two, whose constitutional bans are based on the right to life, Somalia's constitution includes abortion in its section on "Liberty and Security of the Person". Somalia had not ratified the Maputo Protocol or the Convention on the Elimination of All Forms of Discrimination Against Women, as of 2021.

== History ==
Somalia's initially inherited Italy's abortion law, which only allowed life-saving abortions. Before the abolition of slavery in Somalia, abortion was practiced among enslaved women. According to the locally applied interpretation of the sharia, an enslaved woman who had carried or aborted at least one of her master's children could no longer be sold, although her other obligations toward the master remained intact.

Somalia's 1962 penal code had the same provision on abortion as the Italian law. The 2012 Constitution of Somalia permitted life-saving abortions, amid other liberal provisions. According to the Guttmacher Institute, the country had a total abortion ban before this. This constitution, as drafted in July 2012, said that Somali law must adhere to sharia law and that abortions in "cases of necessity" were the only ones thus permitted. During the COVID-19 pandemic in Somalia, restrictions on healthcare and an increased rate of rape contributed to an increase in unsafe abortion.

== Prevalence ==
In 2015–2019, the annual incidence of abortion in Somalia was 93,200, equating to 29% of unintended pregnancies or 11% of all pregnancies. The abortion rate had risen by 46% since 1990–1994, with the proportion of unintended pregnancies resulting in abortion increasing from 19% to 29%.

The overwhelming majority of the country's abortions are unsafe. Unsafe abortion is a major cause of maternal mortality in the country. Self-induced abortions are common, with methods including excessive consumption of medicines such as aspirin, antimalarials, antibiotics, or allergy medication, as well as the use of douches with honey or animal fat, with sheep fat being a traditional abortion method. Abortions are often performed by medical professionals and are typically not performed by traditional birth attendants. In Mogadishu, abortions are performed by illegal providers known as xaqitaan (lit. 'sweepers').

Somalia has among the world's highest rates of fertility and of maternal mortality, as well one of the lowest rates of contraceptive use. The country's predominantly Muslim population largely adheres to pronatalist beliefs that view children as having social and economic value. Many Somali women consider abortion to violate cultural norms. Although the dominant view of abortion in Sunni Islam permits early-stage abortions, many Somalis differ from this view. In Somalia, abortion is commonly viewed as a matter of family or society rather than the medical system. The subject receives almost no coverage in medical education, besides some coverage of post-abortion care. Education of midwives includes some coverage of abortion but addresses referral rather than performing the procedure.

Access to post-abortion care (PAC) in Somalia is inadequate, like other aspects of the country's health system. The government of Somalia listed PAC as an essential procedure in its Essential Package of Health Services, published in 2009. The country introduced PAC guidelines in 2023. The Ministry of Health of the semi-autonomous state of Puntland provided for family planning and PAC in its 2010 Reproductive Health Strategy. The ministry and Save the Children International then led an initiative that introduced PAC to health centers in the state, including rural areas, and introduced the manual vacuum aspiration method, which had previously been rare due to a lack of supplies and personnel.

== See also ==
- Abortion in Africa
- Women's rights in Somalia
