= Abortion in Gabon =

In Gabon, abortion is only legal in the cases of risk to the mother's life, risk of birth defects, pregnancy from rape or incest, or if the mother is a minor in distress, up to ten weeks of pregnancy. Illegal abortions are punishable by prison or fines. Gabon has one of the highest rates of abortion in Sub-Saharan Africa.

Abortion was banned in Gabon under French colonial law, and later by a total ban in 1969. In the 1990s and 2000s, public concerns arose about unsafe abortions and teenage pregnancy, and certain therapeutic abortions were made legal. The current abortion law is from the penal code of 2019. The parliament of Gabon made the abortion law more permissive in 2021, but did not add legal grounds. In 2023, the government proposed easing restrictions further. The majority of people in Gabon believe abortion should be illegal. Research groups have advocated for legalization.

Gabon's high abortion rate is associated with its high rate of teenage pregnancy and low rate of birth control usage. Abortion complications are a common cause of maternal mortality, though the rate has decreased in the 21st century. Many people self-induce abortions using plants or using misoprostol, which is available over-the-counter. Post-abortion care patients often face stigma from providers. In the 21st century, initiatives have made post-abortion care safer in Libreville and educated midwives about procedures.

== Legislation ==
Article 376 of the penal code of Gabon says abortion may be punished by up to five years of prison or a fine of 2 million CFA francs. Article 377 says:

Est punie d'un emprisonnement de deux ans au plus et d'une amende de 1.000 000 plus, ou de l'une de ces deux peines, la femme qui s'est procurée l'avortement à elle-même qui a tenté de se le procurer ou qui a consenti à faire usage des moyens à elle indiqués ou administrés à cet effet.
It is punishable by a prison sentence of up to two years and a fine of 1,000,000, or one of these two penalties, for a woman who has procured or attempted to procure an abortion for herself or who has consented to the use of these means administered to her to this effect.

The second paragraph sets the following exceptions:

lorsqu'il a été prouvé que l'enfant conçu naîtra avec des malformations physiques graves ou incurables;
lorsque cette grossesse compromet gravement la vie de la mère;
lorsque la conception a eu lieu par suite de viol, inceste ou lorsque la mineure se trouve dans un état de détresse grave
when it has been proven that the conceived baby will be born with serious or incurable physical deformities;
when the pregnancy seriously compromises the life of the woman;
when the conception has occurred as a result of rape or incest, or when the minor is in a state of serious distress.

Article 378 sets a gestational limit of ten weeks and requires that an abortion be performed at a hospital by a physician.

Gabon has a law limiting the dissemination of information about abortion, though there is an exception for medical professionals publishing information about legal abortion in journals. Gabon has ratified the Maputo Protocol, which includes a right to safe abortion.

== History ==
Gabon's abortion ban was influenced by France's abortion ban from the French Penal Code of 1810. Gabon was under the jurisdiction of a 1939 law specifying that all means of abortion were banned and that the only ground for therapeutic abortion was a "grave risk to life". A 1969 law completely banned abortion and birth control.

In 1995, the government launched a sexual and reproductive health education program, funded by UNESCO. It came in response to demands for legal contraception and a rise in unsafe abortions and teenage pregnancies. The program conducted studies confirming high rates of teenage pregnancy. It distributed information on abortion, a taboo subject. In 1999, the parliament debated lifting the abortion ban. Birth control was legalized by a women's health measure in 2000 that enacted a right to contraception. A law from 2000 said physicians could permit abortions if they determined there was a risk of maternal death or fetal abnormality. In 2001, the Health Ministry found that illegal abortions resulted in 28.8% of maternal deaths. In the 2000s, there were many reports of fetuses being dumped as garbage. The Gabonese Midwives Association attributed this to the high rate of unsafe sex among teenagers.

Réseau d'Afrique centrale pour la santé reproductive des femmes (Réseau GCG; transl. Central African Network for Women's Reproductive Health) is a group that has advocated for the decriminalization of abortion. It was founded in 2009 by Aimée Patricia Ndembi Ndembi, Gail Pheterson, Justine Mekuí, and Marijke Alblas. It influenced the government's decision to ease abortion restrictions in 2019. Since 2019, the Social Sciences Research Institute of Omar Bongo University has held an annual conference about the prevalence of unsafe abortion.

In March 2021, a law was proposed to the Parliament of Gabon that would increase the gestational limit, remove the requirement of approval from a physician, and expand the grounds to include distress that is not "serious". The law did not add legal grounds; Prime Minister Rose Christiane Raponda said, "It is not yet the right time." It was proposed alongside gender equality bills, which gave women the equal right to initiate divorce and removed the legal requirement that women obey husbands. Raponda said, "The legal changes aim to tackle the issues of violence and discrimination that women face in our society." The law was adopted on 14 May.

In June 2023, under the administration of Ali Bongo Ondimba, the Council of Ministers of Gabon approved a draft law that would permit abortion if the pregnancy caused distress to the woman, had a risk of fetal deformities, or resulted from rape or incest. The law would amend Law 006/2020 and Law 042/2018 of the penal code. The director of the NGO Sensibilisation-Santé-Sexualité called it a "sigh or relief". The law faced opposition from religious leaders. A 2024 survey by Afrobarometer found that 56% of Gabonese believe women who receive abortions should be imprisoned.

Many Facebook pages advertise illegal abortions. Gabon Media Time wrote in 2024 that these pages offer abortions up to eight months of pregnancy, some of which use unspecified abortifacients, for prices between 28,500 and 138,500 francs. The publication said there was an "alarming silence from authorities" on the subject.

== Prevalence ==
In 2015–2019, 57% of pregnancies in Gabon were unintended, and 37% of unintended pregnancies resulted in abortion, equaling 21,100 abortions. Between 1990–1994 and 2015–2019, the unintended pregnancy rate went down by 23% and the share of unintended pregnancies resulting in abortion increased. Gabon's rate of termination of pregnancy is one of the highest in Sub-Saharan Africa, compared to the regional average of about 16%, as of the early 2020s. Abortion is stigmatized, and women who receive abortions face ostracism from society.

Gabon's high rates of unwanted pregnancies and abortions are affected by its low rate of birth control usage. The rate increased from 14% in 2000 to 19% in 2012. Although birth control has been legal since 2000, it is not widespread. In 2010, only 11.5% of contraception used modern methods.

Gabon's maternal death rate is one in eighty-five reproductive-aged women, as of 2019. People in Gabon anecdotally report abortion complications to be a frequent cause of death. Between 2000 and 2012, the Demographic and Health Survey reported decreases in both overall maternal mortality and abortion mortality.

As of 2017, women in their twenties have the highest abortion rate, and abortion rates are not correlated with marital status or whether the woman lives in an urban area. Unlike in most countries, women who have given birth have a higher abortion rate. A 1995 study focused on Libreville found that 19% of women have ever had abortions, of which 46% made the decision to abort on their own. A 2002 qualitative study in the rural Ngounié Province found that motives for abortion include lack of support from the father, lack of financial support, contraceptive failure, and fear of parents' reactions. Women in the study got information about abortion from social groups.

Plants are traditionally and commonly used for self-induced abortions. This method is used by adolescents, who view it as a discreet and low-cost strategy, and by older women who wish to limit their births. Abortions are induced by vaginally inserting objects such as papaya roots, cassava leaves, or ndolé, or by ingesting lemon, ginger, grass, salt, bleach, permanganate or quinine. A self-report study found that 40% of self-induced abortions in Gabon result in complications of varying degrees. Reports of self-induced abortions without complications influence women's decisions to do the same.

Misoprostol (under the brand name Cytotec) is an approved over-the-counter drug for stomach conditions. Women wishing to perform medical abortions can buy the drug at low costs from market vendors, pharmacists, and physicians. It is usually self-administered without the use of mifepristone.

== Post-abortion care ==
Access to post-abortion care (PAC) is limited by stigma. Out of fear of legal repercussions, women who terminate pregnancies often avoid medical treatment unless complications occur. Women seeking PAC for may face mistreatment from providers who suspect them of illegal induced abortion.

Libreville Hospital is the largest maternal hospital in Gabon. It treats 650 PAC patients annually, as of 2014. A 2009 study found that PAC patients at the hospital faced wait times of up to 24 hours and that abortion complications caused 25% of maternal deaths at the hospital. A subsequent initiative introduced manual vacuum aspiration (MVA) to the hospital, replacing dilation and curettage (D&C), in line with WHO guidelines. By 2012, PAC procedures had lower wait times and complication rates. In 2013, it introduced long-acting reversible contraceptives (LARC) and DMPA injections, which were taken up by 25% of patients. Women with children were more likely to choose LARC methods. In 2014, a program introduced misoprostol regimens.

Réseau GCG was founded with the goal of educating the public about PAC in Gabon, Cameroon, and Equatorial Guinea. In the following ten years, GCG trained 500 providers in MVA, misoprostol regimens, and post-abortion IUD insertion, leading to a reduction in maternal mortality. It has collaborated with the Gabon Association of Midwives.
