= Abortion in Ivory Coast =

In Ivory Coast, abortion is illegal except in the cases of pregnancy from rape or incest or if the pregnancy threatens life or health. The country's ratification of the Maputo Protocol commits it to the additional ground of fetal defects. Legal abortions require approval from a physician and from a judge. Initially inheriting France's abortion law, Ivory Coast included a ban on non-life-saving abortions in its 1981 penal code, with exceptions added in 2019 and 2024. Illegal abortions are common and punishments are not enforced.

Ivory Coast's low rate of contraception and high rate of unintended pregnancy contribute to its abortion rate, which is highest among young, unmarried women. Abortion is commonly used as a method for fertility control or birth spacing. Many illegal abortions are performed by medical professionals who use surgical abortion, sometimes at dedicated clinics. Self-induced abortions are also common, which may use traditional methods or imported, unregulated medications. Most of the country's abortions, especially self-induced abortions, are unsafe, contributing to maternal mortality. The law provides for post-abortion care, but it is often not provided. The country has some pro-abortion groups, but religious opposition to abortion is more widespread.

== Legislation ==
The penal code of Ivory Coast bans abortion, with exceptions in cases of pregnancy from rape or incest; risk to the life or physical or mental health of the mother. Through the country's ratification of the Maputo Protocol it permits abortion on these grounds as well as in the case of fetal defects, but its legal code is not in line with the treaty. An abortion requires the approval of two physicians, with judicial approval, besides the one performing the procedure. The requirement is waived if only two doctors are available. The physician must keep a copy of this approval and give another copy to the patient. For minors to receive abortion, parental consent is required, unless the physician determines that it is urgent. In the case of rape, a police report and a judicial ruling are required as proof. Conscientious objection to abortion is permitted by the country's medical code of ethics. The country does not have a reproductive health law or guidelines for abortion services, leading many medical professionals to avoid the procedure.

Under Article 425, providing an illegal abortion is punishable by a prison sentence of one to five years and a fine of 150 thousand to 1.5 million francs, or five to ten years and a fine of 1 to 10 million francs for repeat offenses; the sentence is two to five years and 200 thousand to 2 million francs if the pregnancy causes harm, which is increased to ten to twenty years if it causes death. Article 426 says that receiving an abortion is punishable by six months to two years in prison and a fine of 50 to 500 thousand francs. Those who assist in an abortion may also be punished. Promoting or advertising abortion, whether or not it directly assists in an abortion, is punishable by six months to three years in prison. However, abortion is legal in practice as prosecution is not enforced.

== History ==
France's abortion law of 1920 was inherited by Ivory Coast. The abortion law in the country's penal code partly retains the wording of Article 317 of the French Penal Code of 1810, including the 1939 addition of the word "maneuvers" to encompass all methods of abortion. In the country's 1981 penal code, Article 366 banned abortion except to save the life of the mother. The country introduced a fertility policy in 1997, aiming to introduce contraceptive use, but access remained low, contributing to abortions. By 2000, advocacy for legalizing abortion in Ivory Coast focused on class inequality, as those who could afford abortions were able to receive the procedure safely from providers who were known to authorities.

Ivory Coast ratified the Maputo Protocol on 9 March 2012. Law No. 2019-574, passed on 26 June 2019, amended the penal code to permit abortion in the case of rape, in addition to the existing ground of risk to life. This occurred after the country's 2015 commitment to bringing the penal code in line with international law and advocacy by the United Nations Committee on the Elimination of All Forms of Discrimination Against Women. OpenDemocracy reported in 2022 that a crisis pregnancy center in Abidjan, Étoile du Matin, had engaged in misinformation about the abortion law, such as falsely stating that abortion was legally murder, with support from anti-abortion groups such as the US-based Heartbeat International and the Zambia-based Association for Life of Africa. Senator Mamadou Kano proposed an investigation into the activities. Law No. 2024-358, passed on 19 June 2024, introduced Article 427 of the penal code, which added incest and risk to health as grounds for abortion.

== Prevalence ==
The estimated abortion rate in Ivory Coast in 2015–2019 was 207,000, equating to 37% of unintended pregnancies or 16% of all pregnancies. This increased from 26% of unintended pregnancies in 1990–1994, while the rate of unintended pregnancy decreased by 17%. According to Performance Monitoring for Action (PMA) in 2017, the abortion rate was 40.7 per 1,000 women of reproductive age. A 2012 national survey found that 42.5% of women who have ever been pregnant have had abortions. Abortion rates vary regionally; urban areas have higher rates than rural areas, in part due to higher social independence and access to medical providers. The restrictive abortion law contributes to a lack of official data.

=== Methods ===
Medical professionals perform 47.9% of abortions, while 50.1% are performed at home, as of 2012. In the capital, Abidjan, illegal abortion is widely available from private medical facilities, including some that are dedicated to the procedure. The most common surgical abortion method among illegal medical providers is manual vacuum aspiration. Dilation and curettage is also performed by medical professionals. Surgical abortions are available at hospitals for 50,000 to 150,000 francs (76 to 229 euros), As of 2022. Most people in the country cannot afford this, and some are refused the procedure due to being young or unmarried.

Many women who cannot afford abortions from medical professionals instead receive abortions from non-physician medical providers with inadequate sanitation and services. A common method among such providers involves damaging the gestational sac by inserting a catheter. As of 2012, 49.4% of abortions are either self-induced or performed by traditional healers. Common methods in such cases include ingesting plants such as cotton or coffea; vaginally inserting branches, chemicals, glass, or a mixture of plants and kaolin; consuming excessive amounts of alcohol, sour, or sweet foods (such as cola). Methods vary widely between villages and social strata. These are often unsafe; methods that use toxic herbal products, self-administered drugs, or sharp objects have high risks of mortality. Other self-induced abortions use imported abortion medications, known as "Chinese medications". Costing about 60,000 francs (100 US dollars), the market for these products is unregulated and relies on people's belief in their effectiveness. Pharmacies sell the abortion pill misoprostol for 5,000 to 8,000 francs (10 US dollars), but it is rarely available, so Chinese medications are more common. Many women attempt multiple abortion methods, usually beginning with a traditional provider.

Most abortions in Ivory Coast conducted by untrained providers who use unsafe methods; unsafe abortion comprises six in ten abortions in the country as of 2018. A 2017 survey by PMA categorized 62.4% of abortions as least safe. Unsafe abortion contributes to the country's maternal mortality rate, which is one of the highest in the region, increasing from 330 per 100,000 in 1986 to 597 per 100,000 in 1996, amid an increase in abortion. As of 2018, abortion causes 18% of maternal mortality. In the city, unsafe and fatal abortions are common even in hospitals. A 1995 survey found that one-third of abortions had complications and that one-third of women in the country knew someone who had had a fatal abortion. Self-induced abortions are more likely to result in complications than those performed by medical professionals.

=== Societal factors ===
The country has a high rate of unintended pregnancy and a low rate of contraception, contributing to abortions. Most women who receive abortions are younger than 25 and unmarried; many are also students. Abortion rates are higher among women with more education. The proportion of women under 25 who have had abortions has increased from 6% among those born before 1962 to 26% among those born from 1973 to 1977; a shift occurred from using abortions for birth spacing to using them at the first pregnancy, with an increased preference for small family size. Those who are poor or low-educated are more likely to have unsafe abortions. Young women often self-induce abortions as they cannot afford medical services.

Factors that motivate abortions include inability to afford a baby, inability for the family to help raise a baby, desire to complete education, or avoiding social repercussions of premarital pregnancy. While women themselves generally make the decision to abort, their partners often the ones to pay for the procedure. Parents often influence their decisions and sometimes pressure them into aborting. Since the 1990s, many Ivorian women have used abortion as a method of fertility regulation, particularly in Abidjan, where it has contributed to declines in birth rate around the 1990s.

Abortion is a taboo subject in Ivory Coast, violating religious views as well as gender norms that expect women to have children. The stigma leads to a lack of knowledge about abortion in the country. Social or religious attitudes toward abortion often lead women to regret receiving the procedure. Most women in the country are unfamiliar with the abortion law. As abortion is illegal, women who want abortions rely on social networks with others who have received the procedure for information. As women generally keep abortions secret, the quality of care they receive depends on the knowledge of those with whom they discuss it.

=== Post-abortion care ===
National health guidelines require that abortion patients have access to post-abortion care (PAC). Public and private facilities provide PAC, but illegal abortion providers typically do not. Many PAC providers have incomplete services. Though most of the population lives near a PAC provider, poor or rural women have lower access. The illegality of abortion leads women to delay receiving PAC, which contributes to fatalities. Other reasons women avoid PAC include lack of coverage, lack of information, and lack of confidentiality in public hospitals. Among PAC patients, 43.7% receive post-abortion contraception, and 4.5% receive long-acting reversible contraception, as of 2022.

== Debate and advocacy ==
Pro-abortion activists argue that the requirements for legal proof of rape or incest are too high for women to receive legal abortions. Groups that advocate for legalizing abortion in Ivory Coast include the Collectif des Activistes de Côte d'Ivoire and the Organization for Dialog for Safe Abortion. International organizations such as the United Nations Population Fund and Care International have promoted abortion education within the existing law; others, such as EngenderHealth, have called for the country to bring its law in line with international law. Pro-abortion groups in Ivory Coast have less influence than religious opposition to abortion. Both Christian views and Islamic views against abortion are widespread, and religious authorities such as the Alliance des Religieux pour la Santé Intégrale et la Promotion de la Personne Humaine view that abortion violates the fetal right to life. Among medical professionals, opinions on the abortion law vary between those who support the existing law, believing it works to reduce the risk of unsafe abortions, and those who support reform, believing safe abortions would be more accessible if they were legal.

== See also ==
- Abortion in Africa
- Health in Ivory Coast
- Human rights in Ivory Coast
