= Abortion in the Gambia =

In the Gambia, abortion is illegal except to save the life of the mother or to prevent birth defects. Abortions in the Gambia have high rates of mortality and complications. Abortions are common among adolescents. The Gambia has a stigma surrounding extramarital pregnancy and abortion, and most women's rights groups in the country oppose it. Government facilities provide medically necessary abortions using misoprostol.

Abortions were rarely prosecuted in the 20th century. The country's abortion law, written in 1933 under the colonial government, was based on a British law that banned abortion with no legal grounds. Following the Gambia's ratification of the Maputo Protocol and the Convention on the Elimination of All Forms of Discrimination Against Women, the Women's Act of 2010 legalised abortion in the case of risk to life of the mother or fetus. The country has had little public debate about abortion, especially under the authoritarian presidency of Yahya Jammeh. The Sexual and Reproductive Rights Network, founded in 2019, has advocated for the legalisation of abortion. International organizations have urged the country to bring its law in line with treaties.

== Legislation ==
Section 140 of the Criminal Code of the Gambia makes procuring an abortion a crime punishable by fourteen years of prison. Section 141 criminalises self-induced abortion with a prison sentence of seven years. Section 142 punishes supplying materials for an abortion with three years of prison. Section 198 says abortion is not a crime if it is done to preserve the life of the mother. The law does not specify criteria for legal abortion.

Section 30 of the Women's Act of 2010 legalises abortion if life of the mother is at risk or the baby might have multiple deformities:

1. Every woman has the right to enjoy reproductive rights including the right to medical abortion, where the continued pregnancy endangers the life of the mother or the life of the foetus.
2. The medical abortion permitted under sub-section (1) shall not be carried out without the confirmation of the state of health of the woman in question by a registered medical practitioner who possesses the necessary expertise in the field.
3. Where the woman in question is in an environment where the necessary medical facilities are not available, appropriate referral shall be made in accordance with systems of medical referrals established in the health system.
4. Where the woman in question is unable to afford the medical expenses involved, Government shall bear the cost of the medical expenses.

— Section 30 of the Women's Act 2010

== History ==
Little is known about the attitudes of pre-colonial customary law toward abortion. In the first documented abortion case, in 1873, a British merchant accused the colonial secretary of providing an abortion to a woman named Anna Evans; the case was dropped. In the late 19th century, abortions were common and prosecution was rare. In the 1930s, fears about excessive sexuality led to restrictive laws.

Gambia's abortion law, a version of the Offences Against the Person Act 1861, was introduced by the colonial government in 1933. Section 198 is based on the British Infant Life Preservation Act 1929. The colony's penal code was inherited from that of the United Kingdom as the government felt that a small colony with low crime did not need its own code. The British judicial case of Rex v Bourne (1938) permitted abortion on the grounds of preserving physical or mental health. This ground has never been tested in a Gambian court, and Gambia's laws do not mention this ground.

=== Post-independence ===
The Gambia ratified the Convention on the Elimination of All Forms of Discrimination Against Women (CEDAW) on 16 April 1993 and the Maputo Protocol on 25 May 2005. The Gambia made reservations on four articles of the Maputo Protocol, including Article 14, which affirms rights to reproductive health services including abortion. The government, led by Yahya Jammeh, did not state a reason for its reservations.

In March 2006, the African Center for Democracy and Human Rights Studies, in collaboration with Solidarity for African Women's Rights and local women's rights groups, spoke with the Office of the Vice President, the Minister of Women's Affairs, and the Women's Bureau. They established a mechanism for the National Assembly to revisit the abortion law through meetings with representatives of the government and civil society. The Gambia withdrew its reservations to the Maputo Protocol days before hosting the 2006 African Union Head of States Summit.

The government passed the Women's Act in 2010. It resulted from Section 28 of the 1997 Constitution of the Gambia, about women's rights. It was influenced by CEDAW and the Maputo Protocol. It does not meet the terms of the Maputo Protocol that provide for abortion in the cases of rape, incest, and risk to health of the mother.

The dictatorship of Yahya Jammeh persecuted human rights activists, which may have led activists to avoid discussing abortion. The government did not submit mandatory reports to the African Commission on Human and Peoples' Rights until the transition to democracy under Adama Barrow. In August 2018, the government submitted a report on the African Charter on Human and Peoples' Rights and the Maputo Protocol, which noted the abortion ban and the lack of abortion data. It was reviewed in May 2019, and the Special Rapporteur on Women's Rights in Africa requested further information on next steps. The National Reproductive, Maternal, Neonatal, Child and Adolescent Health Strategic Plan (2017–2021) suggested implementing a strategy to improve post-abortion care.

International bodies such as the Human Rights Committee and the Committee on the Rights of the Child have urged the Gambia to legalise abortion. A 2014 report by the Association of Non-Governmental Organizations, Women's Rights Organizations, and Civil Society Organizations said the law should be brought in line with international law. The Sexual and Reproductive Rights Network, a network of Gambian organisations, was launched in 2019. It hosted the first National Coalition Building Meeting on Sexual and Reproductive Health and Rights, sponsored by the International Campaign for Women's Right to Safe Abortion, on 4 May 2019. The Minister of Women's Affairs, Children, and Social Welfare attended. Participants noted the need for a coalition to advocate for the legalization of abortion in the cases of rape, incest, and risk to health. They proposed an amendment to the constitution guaranteeing a right to health care, including reproductive health.

== Prevalence ==
In 2015–2019, 25% of pregnancies were unintended, and 31% of unintended pregnancies resulted in abortion. In the Mandinka language, abortion is called kónoo bóndoo ([konooː˦ boⁿdoː˦]), which means stomach removing/withdrawal. According to a 1996 study by the Gambia Family Planning Association, the highest abortion rates are in women aged 14 to 24 and in urban or peri-urban areas. Few studies have been conducted on abortion in the Gambia.

The Gambia has a high maternal mortality ratio of 443 per 100,000, significantly impacted by the lack of safe abortion. Unsafe abortions are a major risk factor for infertility and ectopic pregnancy. Government facilities can provide abortion services only to save the life of the woman. Procedures use only misoprostol, following the guidelines of the International Federation of Gynaecology and Obstetrics. There are no national guidelines. Many doctors do not provide abortions due to misunderstanding of the law and fear of prosecution. The Ministry of Health found that, in 2018, there were 1,985 cases of post-abortion care. Most women with post-abortion complications do not seek medical care.

As of 2021, 2.9% of adolescent girls and young women report having abortions. Most teenagers who get abortions get them from untrained, unsafe providers. This often leads to hemorrhage, sepsis, or death. Teenage pregnancies result in 13% of maternal mortality in the Gambia. In 2011, the country had 19 cases of child abandonment. The Comprehensive Health Education curriculum addresses illegal abortion. Though teachers are trained on the sex education curriculum, they have difficulties discussing sensitive topics like abortion, and students consider them unqualified, leading to a lack of knowledge among adolescents.

Unlike other countries, the Gambia does not have significant advocacy or public debate about abortion. Most women's rights activists oppose abortion on religious or moral grounds. Some do not mention abortion out of fear of losing support for other issues. Both pregnancy outside of marriage and abortion are stigmatised by the country's predominantly Muslim society. Unmarried women who get pregnant keep it a secret until they get abortions, to avoid gossip. Many women avoid discussing reproductive health issues unless asked. Traditional birth attendants handle discussions of typically taboo subjects such as abortion. There is a common belief that evil spirits can be summoned to force abortions, so many women keep pregnancies secret in the early stage.

== See also ==
- Health in the Gambia
- Human rights in the Gambia
