= Abortion in Mali =

In Mali, abortion is illegal except in the cases of risk to health or life or pregnancy from rape or incest. The gestational limit is thirteen weeks. Most abortions in the country are illegal and unsafe. Most abortions are received by unmarried women, often motivated by the stigma against pregnancy outside of marriage. Legal providers perform both surgical and medical abortion, and post-abortion care has been available since 2006.

Mali's abortion law was originally based on that of France, with a 1920 French abortion ban being included in Mali's penal code. This was replaced by a 2002 reproductive health law, permitting abortions on the grounds of rape, incest, or risk to life. The country ratified the Maputo Protocol in 2004 and published abortion guidelines in 2012. The 2024 penal code permitted abortion on the existing legal grounds as well as risk to physical or mental health.

== Legislation ==
The 2024 penal code of Mali prohibits abortions except if the pregnancy risks the mother's life or physical or mental health or it resulted from rape or incest. The country's medical code of ethics says abortion is permitted if three physicians say that it is necessary to save the mother's life. Medical abortion is approved up to a gestational age of thirteen weeks.

Article 321-20 of the penal code says illegal abortion is punishable by a prison sentence of five years, a fine of 1,000,000 francs, and a residence ban of ten years. The prison sentence is increased to ten years for forced abortions or up to twenty years for abortions resulting in death. Article 321-21 says a medical professional who performs an illegal abortion may lose their license and be imprisoned for up to five years.

== History ==
During the colonial era, Mali inherited France's abortion law, with a 1920 law banning abortion. Mali modified this law in 1972. The country's penal code specified that abortions are punishable using any methods and at any stage of pregnancy. The legal defense of necessity excused abortions done if the pregnancy poses a serious threat, although the cases in which this applied were unspecified.

The 1920 law existed until 2002, when a reproductive health bill, Law No. 02-044 of 24 June 2002, legalized abortion if a pregnancy is life-threatening or if it resulted from rape or incest. Abortions in other cases remained punishable under the penal code. This law was in line with the recommendations of the International Conference on Population and Development. Mali ratified the Maputo Protocol, which provides for a right to safe abortion, on 26 October 2004. The abortion law and other laws on women's rights in Mali are not in line with this treaty. The National Standards and Protocols for Abortion Care were published in 2012. The same year, Mali's plan for implementation of United Nations Security Council Resolution 1325, an agreement surrounding women's rights, provided for "medical assistance for women with non-desired pregnancies".

In 2017, US President Donald Trump enacted the Mexico City policy, which withheld government funding from organizations that provide abortion services. Family planning organizations in Mali lost 600,000 US dollars upon its enactment, and the group Association Malienne pour la Protection et la Promotion de la Famille lost its source of funding from Planned Parenthood until the policy was rescinded. The Strengthening Abortion Research Capacity in Sub-Saharan Africa Program (STARS)—a group aiming to increase abortion research from African researchers—was launched in 2019 in Mali by the Mali Center for Vaccine Development and the International Center for Research on Women. The program, which published studies and held discussions with the Ministry of Health, academics, and medical professionals, increased interest in research on abortion in Mali. The COVID-19 pandemic in Mali, which occurred amid a national crisis, led to the unavailability of health facilities and reproductive healthcare, and community groups worked to provide safe abortion access. The penal code enacted in December 2024 continued to criminalize abortions, with exceptions for therapeutic abortions.

== Prevalence ==
In 2015–2019, the estimated annual incidence of abortion in Mali was 92,600, equating to 33% of unintended pregnancies or 9% of all pregnancies. The abortion rate had remained stagnant since 1990–1994, during which time the unintended pregnancy rate had decreased by 18%. There is little research on abortion in Mali, and the country has no organizations dedicated to abortion research.

About four-fifths of abortions in Mali are performed outside of health facilities, and most are unsafe. Abortions are often provided by illegal providers with unsanitary conditions; women seeking abortions find these providers through social networks. Unsafe abortion is the fifth-most common cause of maternal mortality in the country, as of 2022. Many abortions are performed by untrained providers. Self-induced abortion is commonly performed by inserting objects into the uterus, consuming excessive doses of medication, or consuming poisons such as soap, dye, or methylene blue. Traditional medicine workers believe abortions can be induced with bitter plants such as Khaya senegalensis and Opilia amentacea. Many sexual slavery camps in Mali have clinics for traditional abortion providers, according to the National Agency for the Prohibition of Trafficking in Persons in 2010. As of 2020, illegal abortion services cost between 40,000 and 110,000 francs, depending on the gestational age.

Legal abortions are available with both medical and surgical abortion. Abortion care is more available at private facilities, according to the 2013 HeRAMS survey by the World Health Organization and the Ministry of Health.

Women with unintended pregnancies often have abortions to avoid negative reactions from family members or society. Abortions are typically the result of premarital sex, as pregnancy outside of marriage is viewed as dishonorable for a family, whereas high birth rates are encouraged for married women. In 1981–1982, 82.1% of pregnancy terminations were among unmarried women. According to some estimates, abortion is common among young women and adolescents.

== Post-abortion care ==
Since it first became available in Mali in 2006, post-abortion care (PAC) has been managed through decentralized local authorities with local funding. Many women with abortion complications only receive PAC through informal providers or self-medication, as revealing abortions risks legal punishment and stigmatization. The NGO Population Services International has trained public and private facilities to provide PAC using manual vacuum aspiration and misoprostol.
