= Abortion in Ghana =

Abortion in Ghana is banned except when there is a valid exemption. Ghanaian law requires that an abortion may be conducted only at a government hospital, registered private hospital, clinics registered under the Private Hospitals and Maternity Homes Act, 1958 (No. 8) or a place approved by the Minister of Health by a Legislative Instrument. Illegal abortions are criminal offenses subject to at most five years in prison for the pregnant woman who induced said abortion, as well as for any doctor or other person who assisted a pregnant woman in accessing, or carrying out, an abortion. Attempts to cause abortions are also criminal, as are the purveyance, supply, or procurement of chemicals and instruments intended to induce abortion.

== Terminology ==
The definition of abortion is quite wide. According to Act 29, section 58, article 3, of the Criminal code of 1960, "Abortion or miscarriage means premature expulsion or removal of conception from the uterus or womb before the period of gestation is completed." Thus, both words, abortion and miscarriage, can be used interchangeably to refer to the same phenomenon. The law would seem to cover induced abortions, where the pregnant woman willfully expels a viable fetus, and also spontaneous abortions, or miscarriages, which may be encouraged by the pregnant woman through various means. Medically, there have been attempts to clearly distinguish between the two, but the laws in Ghana concerning this matter do not make this distinction.

== Exceptions ==
In some situations, abortions are legal. The laws of Ghana allow abortions where (1) the pregnancy was as a result of rape, defilement, or incest, which are themselves all crimes in Ghana, and (2) where the pregnant woman requests the abortion. The pregnant woman's next of kin may request the abortion if the woman lacks the capacity to request it. For instance, if she is unconscious and in need of immediate medical attention that may entail abortion; if she is mentally incapable of making medical decisions (for example has an Intellectual disability); or if she is a minor according to the law. In Ghana, the age of minority is below eighteen years, although the legal age for consent is 16 years of age.

== Law ==
Abortion is a criminal offence pursuant to Act 29, section 58 of the Criminal code of 1960, amended by PNDCL 102 of 1985, which states that:

1. Subject to the provisions of subsection (2) of this section
  1. any woman who with intent to cause abortion or miscarriage administers to herself or consent to be administered to her any poison, drug or other noxious thing or uses any instrument or other means whatsoever; or
  2. any person who—
    1. administers to a woman any poison, drug or other noxious thing or uses any instrument or other means whatsoever with intent to cause abortion or miscarriage, whether or not the woman is pregnant or has given her consent
    2. induces a woman to cause or consent to causing abortion or miscarriage;
    3. aids and abets a woman to cause abortion or miscarriage;
    4. attempts to cause abortion or miscarriage; or
    5. supplies or procures any poison, drug, instrument or other thing knowing that it is intended to be used or employed to cause abortion or miscarriage; shall be guilty of an offence and liable on conviction to imprisonment for a term not exceeding five years.
2. It is not an offense under section (1) if an abortion or miscarriage is caused in any of the following circumstances by a registered medical practitioner specializing in Gynaecology or any other registered medical practitioner in a government hospital or a private hospital or clinic registered under the Private Hospital and Maternity Home Act, 1958 (No. 9) or in a place approved for the purpose by legislative instrument made by the Secretary:
  1. where pregnancy is the result of rape or defilement of a woman or incest and the abortion or miscarriage is requested by the victim or her next of kin or the person in loco parentis, if she lacks the capacity to make such request;
  2. where the continuance of the pregnancy would involve risk to the life of the pregnant woman or injury to her physical or mental health and such a woman consents to it or if she lacks the capacity to give such consent it is given on her behalf by her next of kin or the person in loco parentis;
  3. where there is substantial risk that if the child were born it may suffer from or later develop a serious physical abnormality or disease.
3. For the purposes of this section, abortion or miscarriage means premature expulsion or removal of conception from the uterus or womb before the period of gestation is completed.

== Statistics ==
According to national statistical data from 2009, 7% of all pregnancies are aborted. Within the population of women between 15 and 49, 15% have had abortions. For every 1,000 women in Ghana of childbearing age of 15 to 44, 15 abortions are performed. Another study carried out in the 1990s suggested that in southern Ghana, the number is marginally higher, at 17 abortions for every 1,000 women. This number is lower than the statistics available for West Africa as a whole: abortions rates are at 28 per 1,000 women

Ghanaian women of the following demographics are more likely to have abortions: women who have never been married; women in their twenties; women with no children; wealthy women; and women from urban areas. Never-married women are twice as likely to seek the procedure as those who are married. The tendency to seek abortion decreases with number of children: women with no children are seven times more likely to seek an abortion than women with three or more children. For these women, the most prominent reason for seeking the abortion was the stigma associated with having a child out of wedlock. Women who have had previous abortions are far more likely to seek the procedure. Researchers peg this to the possibility that these women may have more knowledge, both of the legal status of abortions, and more likely, where to obtain the procedure. Women in the top 40% of the wealth distribution in the country are 67%–80% more likely to have abortions that their poorer counterparts. Younger women are more likely to seek abortions, with women between 20 and 24 years being most likely, at 25 abortions per 1,000 women, and the frequency decreasing with every successive age group. Urban women are far more likely to have abortions, with 34 abortions per 1,000 women. Overall, urbanites are 110% more likely to seek abortions than their rural counterparts, at 21 abortions per 1,000 women versus 10 abortions per 1,000 women.

The reasons that Ghanaian women give for seeking abortions include: the financial inability to care for a child, the pregnancy interfering with their occupation or schooling, and wanting to space out their childbearing or to limit family size. Due to limited number of legal practitioners who perform safe abortion, it is expensive; therefore many women cannot afford it and they turn to unsafe abortion by unskilled practitioners.

Approximately 45% of abortions in Ghana are unsafe. 11% of Ghanaian maternal deaths are due to unsafe abortions, and maternal mortality is the second leading cause of death among Ghanaian women. Some women experience complications from these experiences. Because so few women know that abortions are legal on many grounds in Ghana, they do not seek, or demand post abortion care, even when they have legitimate reasons to obtain legal abortions. According to a 2007 survey, only 3% of pregnant women, and 6% of women actively seeking abortions, knew the laws surrounding the procedure.

These numbers are relatively unreliable, because of how stigmatized abortions are in Ghana. Much of this data was collected based on face-to-face interviews, rendering it unlikely that they will reveal an accurate estimate of the occurrence of abortions. According to a paper, the number of abortions in Ghana is more likely to be closer to the West African rate of 28 per 1,000 women.

== Abortion and Contraceptives ==
The low rate of contraceptive use is part of the driver for abortions. According to national statistical data, contraceptive use has increased over the decades, but from 13% use by married women in 1988, to just 25% by this demographic in 2003 followed by a slight decline to 24% in 2008. A much higher proportion of sexually active unmarried women use modern contraceptives, but in 2008, this number was just 28% of the population. As such, 35% of married women, and 20% of sexually active unmarried married fall in the pool of people who are not seeking children, and yet are not using any modern contraceptive methods.

As a consequence of this dearth, upwards of 37% of pregnancies in Ghana are unintended. A further 23% are mistimed, that is to say, do not occur at a time preferred by the individuals. 14% of all pregnancies are not wanted by the individuals pregnant. This translates to more than 300,000 children being products of unwanted pregnancies.

Overall, the average number of children Ghanaian women have has decreased from 6.4 to 4.0 between 1988 and 2008. Nonetheless, this does not match the recorded desire of women, who wish to have fewer than four children. For more than a third of these women who are not looking for children nor are on contraceptives, the reason they give for not doing so are often health related, or a fear of the side effects and the risks associated with the use of contraceptives. The proportion of women in this pool rises with education and urbanity. Poorer women are overall more likely to have unplanned births, and less likely to use modern contraceptives, than their wealthier counterparts.
