= Abortion in Tanzania =

Overview of the legality and prevalence of abortions in Tanzania

Abortion is illegal in Tanzania except to preserve the life of the mother. Under the Tanzanian penal code, health practitioners who perform illegal abortions may receive sentences of up to 14 years in prison, while those who procure abortions for themselves may be sentenced to up to seven years in prison.

It is estimated that there were 405,000 induced abortions in Tanzania in 2013. Due to fears of prosecution, women procure abortions clandestinely, often in conditions that are unsafe. Tanzania has one of the highest maternal mortality ratios in the world, with unsafe abortions being one of the leading causes of maternal death. The availability of the medication misoprostol has led to increased access to safe abortion.

While Tanzania is a signatory to the Maputo Protocol, it has not adopted legislation that would allow abortion in cases of pregnancy from rape, incest, or risk of harm to the mental and physical health of the mother. A Safe Motherhood Bill that would have aligned Tanzanian law with the Maputo Protocol was rejected by the National Assembly in 2012.

== Legality ==
Tanzania has one of the most restrictive abortion laws in the world, with abortion only allowed to save the life of the mother. People convicted of performing abortions can be imprisoned for up to 14 years, while women convicted of procuring an abortion can be imprisoned for up to seven years. Other parties involved in an illegal abortion, such as those who supply medications or instruments, may be imprisoned for up to three years.

=== Penal code ===
Tanzania's abortion laws originated with legal codes imposed during British colonial rule. In mainland Tanzania, Articles 150 to 152 of the penal code prohibit unlawful abortion, while Article 230 permits abortion to preserve the life of the mother. Chapter XV of the country's penal code regards abortion as an "offense against morality" and Article 219 additionally prohibits "child destruction", meaning abortion after fetal viability, presumed at 28 weeks of pregnancy, unless it is done to preserve the life of the mother. In Zanzibar, the penal act has equivalent articles 129 to 131, 213 and 200.

The right to abortion due to risk to the health of the mother is not explicitly mentioned in Tanzanian law. The judicial decision in the 1938 British court case Rex v Bourne was affirmed by the East African Court of Appeal, which had jurisdiction over Tanganyika Territory, Tanzania's colonial predecessor. The decision interpreted preserving a woman's life as preserving both her physical and mental health. Sources state that the affirmation of this decision remains binding after independence.

The penal code does not specify the type of healthcare provider who determines eligibility for abortions or require consultation with other healthcare professionals. Therefore, mid-level workers such as midwives may perform abortions without being required to consult others.

=== International treaties and instruments ===
Tanzania is a signatory to the Convention on the Elimination of All Forms of Discrimination Against Women and the African Charter on Human and Peoples' Rights. In 2007, Tanzania ratified the Maputo Protocol, which requires the government to "protect the reproductive rights of women by authorising medical abortion in cases of sexual assault, rape, [and] incest, and where the continued pregnancy endangers the mental and physical health of the [pregnant woman] or the life of the [pregnant woman] or the foetus." Despite ratification, provisions beyond those for preserving the life of the mother have not been incorporated into national law.

== Prevalence ==
Despite the illegality of abortion in Tanzania, clandestine abortion services are often accessible to those who can afford them, especially in urban areas such as Dar es Salaam. Abortion-related prosecutions are not unheard of, but are rare. In 2013, it is estimated that there were 405,000 induced abortions in Tanzania.

As of 2017, the total fertility rate in Tanzania was 5.0 percent and contraceptive use stood at around 25 percent. As of 2010, 26 percent of births in the country were from unintended pregnancies.

According to statistics from Tanzanian hospitals, there are 36 induced abortions per 1000 women. Self-induced abortions in Tanzania have reportedly involved the insertion of sharp objects into the uterus, high doses of anti-microbial drugs, detergents, concentrated teas, cassava stems, or wood ashes. Some women later experience infections, bleeding, complications during their later pregnancies, or death. Studies have suggested that nearly 60% of women who are admitted to hospitals for miscarriages have actually undergone abortions.

=== Maternal deaths ===
Tanzania has one of the highest rates of maternal death in the world. The maternal mortality ratio was 398 per 100,000 live births in 2017. Due to fears of prosecution, women seek to procure abortions clandestinely, often in conditions that are unsafe. Unsafe abortions are estimated to be the second leading cause of maternal death in Tanzania. A 2012 study by the Muhimbili University of Health and Allied Sciences found that one in three women who had abortions between the ages of 15 and 24 had the procedure done by a non-professional. As of 2014, complications from abortions were responsible for around 16% of maternal deaths.

The Ministry of Health and Social Welfare started a training program for post-abortion care in 2000. The ministry has also made efforts to address maternal death through its initiative, the National Road Map Strategic Plan to Accelerate Reduction of Maternal, Newborn and Child Deaths.

=== Availability of abortifacient medications ===
In 2007, the Tanzanian Food and Drugs Authority approved the medication misoprostol as a treatment for postpartum bleeding. The medication was further approved for treating incomplete abortions in 2011. While misoprostol is not approved for use as an abortifacient in Tanzania, it is commonly used to induce medical abortions. These usually occur outside of medical facilities and without medical supervision.

== Sentiment and advocacy ==
Politically and culturally, the people of Tanzania are largely anti-abortion. As of 2018, the majority of the population practices Christianity (60%) or Islam (35%). Public discourse in the country tends to frame abortion as a moral transgression or sin.

A bill for a Safe Motherhood Act was introduced in the National Assembly in 2012. The bill proposed to align the country's laws with the Maputo Protocol by expanding abortion access to pregnancies resulting from rape or incest, where continuing the pregnancy would pose a substantial risk of the fetus having mental or physical abnormalities, or where a woman's mental or physical health would be threatened. The bill failed to pass. During the mid-2010s Constitutional review process, the Women and the Constitution Coalition, a coalition of 50 Tanzanian women's rights groups, lobbied for the inclusion of sexual and reproductive health and rights in the Constitution.

Efforts to liberalize the country's abortion laws have been supported by the Tanzania Women Lawyers Association (TAWLA), the East African Community, Care International, and the White Ribbon Alliance. The organization Pro-Life Tanzania, operating under the auspices of the Catholic Church, was established in 1994. It receives funding from the U.S.-based Human Life International and actively counters initiatives that would allow for more permissive abortion policies in the country.
