= Abortion in Equatorial Guinea =

In Equatorial Guinea, abortion is only legal if the pregnancy poses a risk to health or life of the mother or fetus, or in the case of pregnancy from rape or incest, up to twelve weeks of gestational age. Equatorial Guinea mandates spousal consent for abortions. People who receive or assist with illegal abortions may face fines or prison. A 1991 abortion law banned abortions except to save the life or health of the mother. A 2020 law expanded legal grounds. Abortion is considered forbidden in Fang culture and is widely opposed by Catholics, the main religious group in the country.

== Legislation ==
The Law on Regulation of Abortion, passed in 1991, says that abortion is legal only in the cases of risk to health or life. This law states that an abortion must be performed at a health center with approval of a health professional. It says that the spouse or guardian of the pregnant woman may object to an abortion, though courts may overrule this objection. Illegal abortions may be punished by six months to twelve years in prison for people who receive or provide abortions, as well as for parents who cooperate with the abortion.

Law 4/2020 on Sexual and Reproductive Rights was approved in June 2020. It established a right to family planning and regulated contraception and therapeutic abortion. Article 23 of the law permits abortion if a medical professional determines the pregnancy risks the life of the woman or fetal defects, or in the case of rape or incest. Article 24 sets a gestational limit of twelve weeks.

The penal code of Equatorial Guinea lists abortion as a criminal offense, though the government has stated that this law is not in effect, according to the Office of the United Nations High Commissioner for Human Rights. As of June 2022, Equatorial Guinea is one of eleven countries that requires spousal consent for abortion. Equatorial Guinea has ratified the Maputo Protocol, which includes a right to safe abortion.

== Prevalence ==
The Global Abortion Policies Database does not have data on the abortion rate in Equatorial Guinea. According to the Guttmacher Institute, 64% of reproductive-aged women in Equatorial Guinea have an unmet need for contraception, which contributes to abortions.

The country's population is predominantly Catholic and adheres to Catholic opposition to abortion. Traditionally, Fang people have rarely used contraception or abortion, which are culturally forbidden as large family sizes are valued. In 1994, the only hospital in the rural Nsork district reported an abortion rate of 0.48 per woman, which was not correlated with age. Rumors claim that Chinese medical providers, which are poorly regulated in the country, perform illegal and deadly abortions. The Gabon-based Middle African Network for Women’s Reproductive Health aims to increase access to post-abortion care in Gabon, Cameroon, and Equatorial Guinea. It has conducted workshops with midwives in Equatorial Guinea.
