= Abortion in Guinea =

In Guinea, abortion is illegal unless the pregnancy poses a threat to the life or health of the pregnant woman or fetus, if it resulted from rape, or if the pregnant woman is a minor. Illegal abortions are punishable by fines and prison. Legal abortions require approval from doctors in the case of therapeutic abortion or ethics committees in the case of abortion from rape. Initially inheriting France's abortion law, fully banning abortion, a 2000 reproductive health law added exceptions. Women's rights activists and journalists have advocated for reform, while Islamic opposition to abortion is common.

Guinea has a high rate of unsafe abortion. The country's use of contraceptives is low, which contributes to unwanted pregnancies and abortions, especially among adolescents. Lack of access to emergency contraception in cases of sexual violence is a frequent cause of abortion. Post-abortion care has been available in Guinea since the 1990s. It is available at public facilities across the country, but fewer providers exist than required by law. Nearly all of these facilities use the manual vacuum aspiration method, and most offer post-abortion family planning.

== Legislation ==
Articles 262 and 263 of the penal code of Guinea prohibit abortion without a legal defense. Legal therapeutic abortions require a diagnosis from a group of doctors that the woman cannot carry the pregnancy or the fetus would have defects. In the case of pregnancy from rape, an ethics committee may approve that the abortion is acceptable. Abortions for minors are always legal. Abortions must be performed by physicians.

The sentence for an illegal abortion is one to two years of prison and a fine of 500,000 to 5 million Guinean francs for first-time offenders. Repeat offenders may face 2 to 5 years in prison or a fine of 10 million francs. Some lawyers say a woman can be imprisoned for receiving a non-therapeutic abortion even in the case of rape. Others believe that the ethical risks of pregnancy from rape are a ground for abortion under the penal code. One legal interpretation says that the law does not penalize a woman who receives an abortion, but only the provider.

== History ==
Guinea inherited had a French total abortion ban based on the Napoleonic Code. The 1994 International Conference on Population and Development led the government of Guinea to improve post-abortion care (PAC) services. PAC was introduced to Guinea in 1998, following successful initiatives in Senegal and Burkina Faso. The program debuted at Donka Hospital and Ignace Deen Hospital. The program was later introduced in 38 other public hospitals.

A reproductive health law passed on 10 July 2000 eased the abortion ban, permitting abortions in cases of risk to life or health, pregnancy from rape, or risk of fetal defects. The Ministry of Health's 2008–2012 Family Planning Repositioning Strategic Plan aimed to strengthen contraceptive use and PAC. In 2013, post-abortion contraceptive use was the highest in West Africa. The frequency of PAC procedures went down during the COVID-19 pandemic.

Today's Women International Network, a women's rights group founded in Guinea, advocates for sexual and reproductive healthcare, including family planning and post-abortion care. On 18–19 March, 2020, twenty journalists met in Conakry for a discussion on sexual and reproductive rights and abortion. They recommended that the government revise the 2000 law and introduce sexual education programs. On 25 March 2021, le Réseau des Médias Africains pour la Promotion de la Santé et l’Environnement (transl. African Media Network for the Promotion of Health and Environment) held a forum to inform journalists about illegal abortions. Its coordinator urged the government to bring its abortion law in line with the Maputo Protocol.

== Prevalence ==
In 2015–2019, the annual number of pregnancies was 631,000, of which 204,000 were unwanted and 77,000 resulted in abortion. Between 1990–1994 and 2015–2019, the abortion rate increased by 48% while the unintended pregnancy rate remained steady. Guinea's rates of unsafe abortion and maternal mortality are among the highest in the world. Safe abortion is only available in cases of fetal deformity or life-threatening pregnancy. Guinea has a strong stigma about abortion. Opposition to abortion is widespread due to the law and Islamic views.

The low rate of contraceptive use contributes to unwanted pregnancies and unsafe abortions. As of 1995, most girls aged 15-24 do not use birth control, and 25% have been pregnant, of which 22% resulted in abortion. As of 2018, in Matoto sub-prefecture, 32.1% of sexually active secondary school girls have been pregnant, of which 30.8% had abortions. Frequent rapes in the country lead to unwanted pregnancies and abortions. Victims of sexual violence often face difficulty accessing emergency contraception, which may lead to unsafe abortions.

== Post-abortion care ==
In 2014, 38 of the 456 public facilities in Guinea provided post-abortion care (PAC). National policy required 122 of them to provide PAC. PAC was available at two of the three national hospitals, all regional hospitals, three-quarters of prefectural and municipal hospitals, and 3.8% of urban health centers. The price of PAC is legally fixed. As of 2015, 34.5% of PAC patients have severe complications.

As of 2014, 31 of the 38 prefectures of Guinea have PAC facilities. There are 416 trained PAC providers, of which the most are in Conakry and Boké Prefecture and the fewest are in Labé Prefecture and Faranah Prefecture. Only 16% of providers are in rural areas, where 62% of Guineans live, according to the Guinea Costed Implementation Plan in 2013. As of 2015, all regions have comprehensive PAC, with the highest coverage in Nzérékoré Region and the best performance in Boké Region.

As of 2014, 94.7% of PAC facilities offer 24/7 care. Manual vacuum aspiration (MVA) is used at 99% of providers and long-acting reversible contraceptives (LARC) are available at 95%. As of 2013, 95.2% of patients receive post-abortion counseling and 73.0% get post-abortion family planning, of which 29.6% were LARC. The use of modern contraception is significantly higher among PAC patients than the general population. In two hospitals in Conakry from April to August 2014, there were 426 PAC patients, all of which were treated with MVA. Of these patients, 92.5% were satisfied with their care. They reported low waiting times, satisfactory pain management, confidentiality, and access to their desired birth control.

== See also ==
- Health in Guinea
- Human rights in Guinea
- Women's rights in Guinea
