= Abortion in the Republic of the Congo =

In the Republic of the Congo, abortion is illegal in all cases. The law, based on that of France, sets fines and prison sentences for abortions, but these are rarely enforced. Abortion is common, particularly among young women, with the highest rates in Niari and Pointe-Noire. Illegal providers in Brazzaville, known as manganguistes, sell abortion pills and perform abortions. Unsafe abortion contributes to maternal mortality. Activists and doctors have advocated for legalizing abortion, while other activists have led anti-abortion campaigns.

== Legislation ==
Article 317 of the penal code of the Republic of the Congo bans abortion on all grounds. Providing an abortion is punishable by a prison sentence of 120 thousand to 2.4 million francs, or 1.2 to 4.8 million francs for repeat offenses. Receiving or assisting in an abortion is punishable by six months to two years in prison and a fine of 24 to 480 thousand francs. Health workers who provide materials or recommendations for abortion may be punished by six months to two years in prison and a fine of 240 thousand to 2.4 million francs. An abortion may be legal if authorized by a committee. As a colony of France, Congo inherited France's abortion law, and it retains Article 317 of the French Penal Code of 1810. Abortion is also prohibited by Article 2 of the family code and Article 8 of the code of ethics for social affairs professions. The country is a party to the Maputo Protocol, which includes a right to abortion on certain grounds, but its law is not in line with the treaty.

== Prevalence ==
The estimated annual abortion rate in Congo in 2015–2019 was 54,700, equating to 43% of unintended pregnancies or 21% of all pregnancies. This rate had decreased by 15% since 1995–1999 after having increased by 11% since 1990–1994, equating to an unchanging proportion of unintended pregnancies. Unsafe abortion contributes to the country's high maternal mortality rate. The country does not have official abortion statistics.

In Brazzaville, abortions are commonly provided by illegal vendors of abortion pills or herbal products, known as manganguistes. As of 2020, they provide nearly 80% of the city's abortions, with many conducting the procedure themselves in their homes or offices. Illegal abortions in the city cost 10,000 to 50,000 francs (15 to 76 euros), as of 2024. Abortion products sold by mangaguistes cost 100 to 10,000 francs as of 2020, lower than the cost in licensed pharmacies. Illegal abortion products are often unsafe.

A 2012 Ministry of Health report said that, of 10,000 women surveyed, 23% had had abortions. A survey published in 2020 in PLOS One estimated that 39% of women of reproductive age in the country had had abortions. Abortion rates are highest in the departments of Niari and Pointe-Noire, as of 2017. The most likely women to have abortions are under 30, married, urban, upper-class, or educated. A 2015 survey found that 31.3% of young women had had abortions. The most common motives for abortions are desire to space births and inability to afford a child; other motives include influence of partners and desire to continue work or education.

Illegal abortions in the country are almost never prosecuted. The activist group Avenir-Nepad-Congo aims to educate the public about abortion and increase availability of medical abortion. Some doctors have also advocated for abortion reform. In 2018, it was reported that certain anti-abortion movements in Congo had engaged in fake news campaigns targeting youth on social media.

== See also ==
- Abortion in Africa
- Health in the Republic of the Congo
- Human rights in the Republic of the Congo
