= Abortion in Botswana =

Abortion in Botswana is only legal if the abortion will save the woman's life, if the pregnancy gravely endangers the woman's physical or mental health, or if it is a result of rape or incest. In Botswana, abortions that meet these requirements must be performed within the first 16 weeks of pregnancy in a government hospital and must be approved by two physicians.

== Impact of restrictive abortion laws ==
Though women in Botswana are recognized as having some of the best access to abortions in Sub-Saharan Africa because of these exceptions, many women are still resorting to unsafe abortions and self-induced abortions, commonly leading to maternal death.

== Socio-cultural impacts on abortion ==
In Botswana, many families still follow the lobola custom where men pay a woman's family in order to take her as a bride. This is a way of thanking the parents of the wife for building and molding such a young lady.
