= Ministry of Health (Eritrea) =

Government ministry of Eritrea

The Ministry of Health is an Eritrean government department that is responsible for overseeing healthcare in the country. Amna Nurhussien is the current minister. The ministry was established in 1991 following Eritrea became an independent nation from Ethiopia.
