= Abortion in Namibia =

Abortion in Namibia is restricted under the Abortion and Sterilisation Act of South Africa (1975), which Namibia inherited at the time of Independence from South Africa in March 1990. The act only allows for the termination of a pregnancy in cases of serious threat to the maternal or fetal health or when the pregnancy is a result of rape or incest. This law has not been updated since, and attempts to liberalise it have been met with fierce opposition from religious and women's groups.

== Legal position ==
Abortion is only allowed when continuing the pregnancy will:

endanger the woman’s life or constitute a serious threat to her physical or mental health or there must be a serious risk that the child to be born will suffer from a physical or mental defect so as to be irreparably seriously handicapped, when the foetus is alleged to have been conceived in consequence of unlawful carnal intercourse (rape or incest); or when the foetus has been conceived in consequence of illegitimate carnal intercourse and the woman is, owing to a permanent mental handicap or defect, unable to comprehend the implications of or bear the parental responsibility for the "fruit of coitus".

In addition to the woman’s doctor, two other doctors are required to certify the existence of grounds for an abortion, and the operation must be performed by a medical practitioner in a State hospital or an approved medical facility." In a statement at the 1994 International Conference on Population and Development in Cairo, then Minister of Health and Social Services Nickey Iyambo stated:

On the question of abortion, the position of Namibia is that it can only be performed under strict medical supervision within the confines of the laws, which state that consent to abortion can only be given in cases of rape, incest and when the life of the mother is in danger. Mr. President, ladies and gentlemen it must be clearly understood that Namibia does not promote abortion as a means of family planning but as a public health issue.

In 2011, under '24.7: HIV and Pregnancy' of the Namibia Standard Treatment Guidelines, it is noted that "A woman with HIV has the right to terminated the pregnancy as a medical indication".

In 2020 a petition to legalise access to abortion gained over 60,000 signatures. It not only aimed to amend laws on abortion, but it also demanded improved access to education on abortion and sexual health and reproductive rights, as well as the implementation of counselling and support services for women to make informed decisions regarding their bodies. The petition organisers quoted President Geingob who in 2019 recognised the high abortion-related death rates as a clear outcome of illegal abortions which will continue to occur if laws are not amended.

== Impact of abortion restrictions ==
Many Namibians believe that abortion is illegal under any circumstance and are unaware of the legal exceptions. The lack of knowledge, emergency contraceptive use and access to safe legal abortions are contributing factors to the problem of abandonment of newborns or 'baby dumping', which is acknowledged to be a serious problem in the country.

For abortion to be as safe as possible for a woman, the procedure needs to be performed as early in pregnancy as her decision about continuing the pregnancy permits. If the process is not done accordingly and by a professional, it might lead to infertility, death or permanent injury including paralysis.

Many women undergo illegal abortions carried out by backstreet abortionists, private clinics and themselves, however there is very little research on the scale of unsafe abortions, perceptions on abortion and the availability, quality of abortion/ post-abortion care in Namibia. However, there is little sympathy for women seeking or having illegal abortions and within the media, abortion is framed in a particularly negative light. The lack of reliance on abortion by young women has seen a rise in pregnancy for girls aged 15-19 from 15% in 2006 to 19% in 2013, with one region recording levels as high as 39%.

== Statistics ==
In 2021, medical doctor David Emvula told a parliamentary hearing that 14 Namibian women had died from unsafe abortions between April 2018 and March 2012. He estimated that 7,000 unsafe abortions had been performed in 2017.
