= Abortion in Eswatini =

In Eswatini, abortion is a criminal offence except on the grounds of pregnancy from rape or incest, risk to life or health, or fetal defects. Providing or receiving an illegal abortion is punishable by life imprisonment. This abortion law is from the 2005 Constitution of Eswatini, before which there was no written abortion law. In 2012, the Parliament of Eswatini debated the abortion law; some members supported legal abortion as a form of population control, while others opposed it as a form of killing. Advocates of legal abortion believe that illegality contributes to the maternal mortality rate. Illegal abortions are common in the country. Use of birth control is low. Unsafe abortions are a leading cause of death of women. Some women travel to South Africa for legal abortions. Post-abortion care is available but inadequate.

== Legislation ==
Section 15(5) of the Constitution of Eswatini says abortion is only legal if a physician certifies that the pregnancy would threaten the life or health of the woman or child, or if the pregnancy was the result of rape, incest, or "unlawful sexual intercourse with a mentally retarded female." It also provides for abortion "on such other ground as Parliament may prescribe", but such legislation has not been passed, as of 2022. Receiving, performing, or aiding in an illegal abortion is a crime punishable by life imprisonment. As of 2017, Eswatini is one of three countries with a constitutional provision banning abortion.

== History ==
The British colonial government did not create an abortion law in Swaziland (now Eswatini). Before having a written abortion law, Swaziland was subject to common law. It primarily followed Roman-Dutch law, as had been implemented in South Africa, which allowed abortion only to save the woman's life. An English law principle, in which the offence of abortion required the woman to be "quick with child", may also have applied. The constitutional abortion law was implemented in 2005 with the goal of protecting women's rights.

In 2011, Swaziland was one of several countries to object when the United Nations special rapporteur on the Right to Health, Anand Grover, called for every country to decriminalise abortion. The same year, three nurses were sentenced to fifteen years in prison for assisting in abortions. In October 2012, the Parliament of Eswatini debated legalising abortion. It was proposed by MP Johannes Ndlangamandla, who said that "abortion should be legalised to curb the population of unwanted babies who end up becoming a burden to government", and disagreed with the argument that it would be against Christianity. Other MPs said abortion was "equivalent to murder". A portion of the parliament considered abortion good for population control. The Times of Swaziland disagreed, saying that condom use would better control the population.

During the presidency of Donald Trump, the United States instated the Mexico City policy, which banned federal funding for foreign organisations that perform or advocate for abortion. This impacted programs for outreach and management of HIV/AIDS in Eswatini. As a result of the policy, the Family Life Association of Eswatini, a family planning group, lost its funding from the U.S. government initiative PEPFAR and ended its medical circumcision services. The association had advocated for the legalisation of abortion, citing the lower maternal mortality rate in South Africa, where abortion is legal. In 2020, a High Court judge, Qinisile Mabuza, voiced her support for legalising abortion. After hearing a case of infanticide, she said that a ban on abortion led to such measures and decreased women's autonomy. As of 2024, activists have mobilised against international anti-abortion groups in Eswatini and other countries in the region.

== Prevalence ==
In 2015–2019, Eswatini had an annual average of 46,600 pregnancies, of which 33,500 were unintended and 8,800 resulted in abortion. The abortion rate increased 58% between 1990–1994 and 2015–2019. As of 2007, the estimated abortion rate is 18.9 per 1,000 women.

Abortions are often unsafe due to being illegal. As of 2012, the ministry of health estimates that 19% of deaths of women were caused by abortions. Post-abortion care (PAC) in the country has poor standards for operation. In October 2012, a clinic in Manzini treated over 1,000 women for abortion complications. Though abortion is legal in the case of rape, it is difficult to access. Eswatini's health budget is below the global average and has no sexual and reproductive health budget. The country relies on funding from donors. Many Swazi women seeking abortion go to neighbouring South Africa, where it is legal. Many cannot afford the cost of travel and of care from private facilities there.

Unplanned pregnancies lead women to seek abortions. Children from unplanned pregnancies may be abandoned. A high unmet need for contraception contributes to the abortion rate. Women with more education have lower abortion rates and higher rates of contraceptive use. There is a high rate of unsafe abortions among adolescents. Sex workers have high rates of unwanted pregnancy, and 11.7% have had abortions, as of 2011. Women who cannot access abortion may commit infanticide. Cases of baby corpses abandoned in remote areas are commonly reported. Swazi society widely opposes abortion. A 1998 survey found that 86% of Swazis view abortion as murder. A 2005 survey of healthcare workers found that most did not wish for abortion training, though most wished for training in PAC. Many said they would be willing to refer patients to providers.

== See also ==
- Human rights in Eswatini
