= Abortion in Seychelles =

In Seychelles, abortion is legal in the cases of risk to life, risk to physical or mental health, birth defects, pregnancy from rape, or mental incapacity. Abortion must be approved by three doctors or by a judge. It is only permitted in the first twelve weeks of pregnancy, except in exceptional circumstances. There is only one legal abortion provider, Victoria Hospital. The rate of illegal abortion is believed to be high.

Abortion was banned under French and later British rule. After the independence of Seychelles, the United Kingdom's Abortion Act 1967 influenced the easing of restrictions. The country passed abortion legislation in 1981 and 1994. There have not been major movements to legalise abortion. The rates of unintended pregnancy have fallen in the 21st century. However, the rate of teenage pregnancy has remained high, motivating abortion among adolescents. In response, the government, gynaecologists, and activists have promoted sexual education about abortion for teenagers.

== Legislation ==
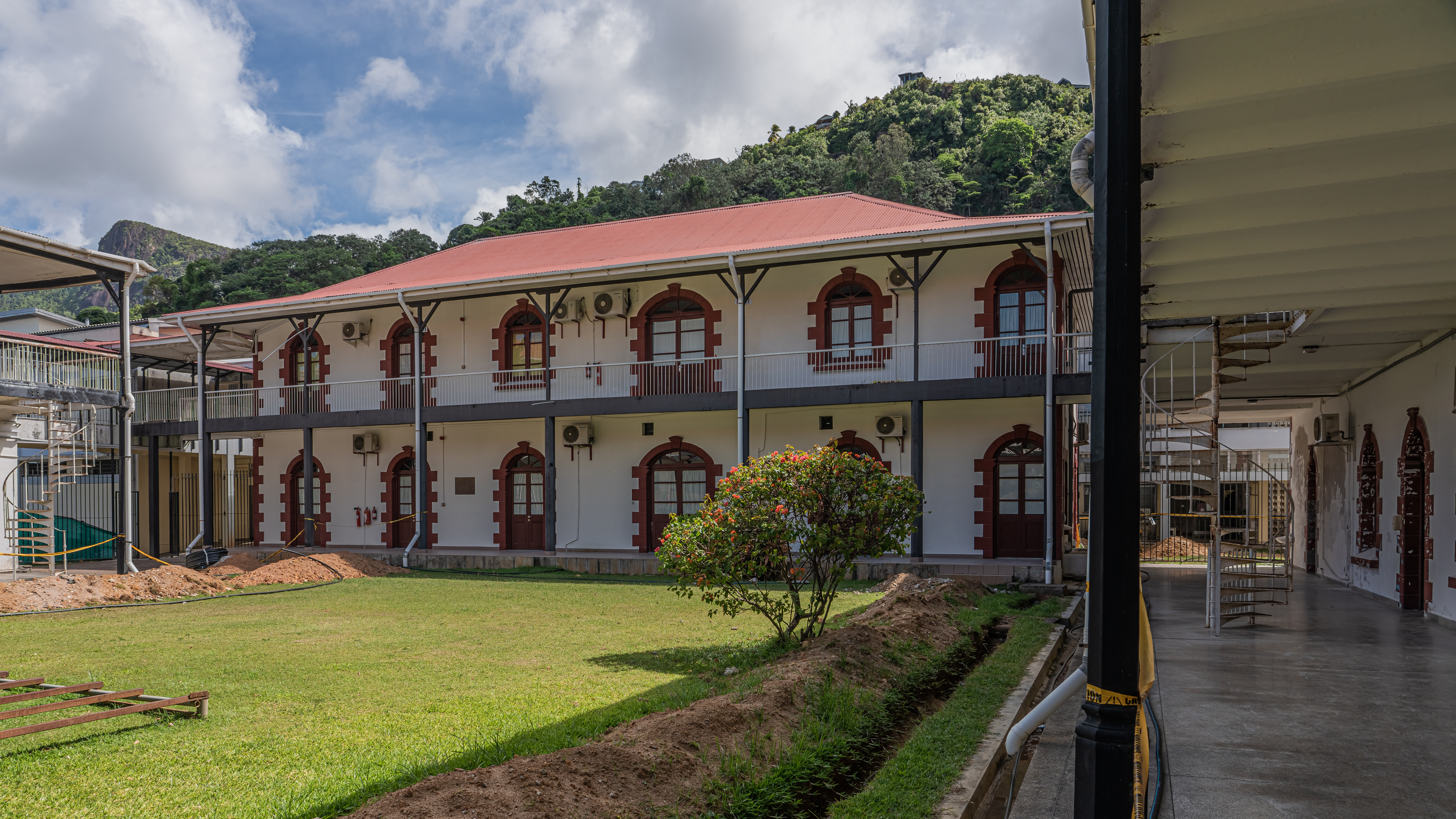
Victoria Hospital is the only legal abortion provider in the country.

The Termination of Pregnancy Act of 1994 defines the legal grounds for abortion. Abortion is legal if the pregnancy poses a risk to the life or physical or mental health of the mother, or if it may cause birth defects. A judge may authorise an abortion if the pregnancy was caused by rape or if the mother is psychologically unfit. The act sets a gestational limit of twelve weeks, unless the Director of Health Services determines that exceptional circumstances require late termination of pregnancy. An abortion must be authorised by three doctors, including a specialist. These doctors may include the doctor who proposes the procedure and the gynaecologist who performs it, and the national Director of Health Services. According to legal scholars Rebecca J. Cook and Bernard M. Dickens, the requirement for approval may violate the right to privacy in the African Charter on Human and Peoples' Rights. Minors must receive parental consent. The only legal abortion provider is Victoria Hospital on the island of Mahé.

== History ==
Under the French colonial government, Seychelles adopted the French Penal Code of 1810, banning abortion. A 1939 amendment permitted abortion only to save the mother's life. Seychelles was later a British colony, and it received a new penal code, inspired by that of the Colonial Office, in the 1930s, banning abortion in all cases. The Termination of Pregnancy Act of 1981, implemented in April 1981, defined the legal grounds for abortion. It specified that the procedure must be performed by a gynecologist at Victoria Hospital, with the approval of doctors. The country implemented a law almost identical to the British Abortion Act 1967, as Zambia had done earlier. The Termination of Pregnancy Act contained most of the grounds for abortion under the British law, including a clause allowing conscientious objection to abortion. However, it did not include socioeconomic grounds for abortion, unlike the British law, which had required the consideration of the mother's previous children. It set a gestational limit of sixteen weeks.

When the Constitution of Seychelles was rewritten in 1992, the ruling Seychelles People's Progressive Front included a statement permitting abortion. The opposition parties rejected this, backed by the Catholic Church. Abortion remained illegal under the existing grounds, but the Termination of Pregnancy Act of 1994 changed the gestational limit. Seychelles signed the Maputo Protocol, which includes a right to abortion, in 2006. Imaz Press Réunion wrote in 2022 that Seychelles was unlikely to legalise abortion on demand soon because the country is very religious and there are no major abortion rights movements. After the Seychelles Law Commission was established in 2023, it was authorised to conduct legal development projects about social issues such as abortion.

== Prevalence ==
Each year from 2008 to 2003, Seychelles had between 400 and 500 legal abortions and about 1500 live births. In 2023, 13% of abortion recipients were aged 10–19, 78% were aged 20–39, and 7% were aged 40–49. The National Bureau of Statistics only records legal abortions but estimates that there are many illegal abortions, which are often induced using prescription drugs. The estimated rate of illegal abortions increased in the 1990s and 2000s.

Many women in Seychelles choose to terminate pregnancies for reasons such as financial instability or relationship issues. Since the 1990s, the country's fertility and pregnancy rates have fallen. Despite this, teenage pregnancy rates remained high in the 2000s. As of 2022, most districts of the country have increasing rates of teenage pregnancy. Minors require parental consent to receive birth control, which may contribute to the rate. Gynecologists and activists have argued that sexual education for teenagers does not adequately explain birth control options to prevent unplanned pregnancies. The Elles Foundation works to support pregnant teenagers and to promote sexual education. In 2022, the Department of Social Affairs said it was working to address issues such as abortion and teenage pregnancy.

In August 2004, women paid about 7,000 Seychellois rupees for an abortion, though the cost to the Ministry of Health could be up to R30,000 and the procedures were often fatal, according to gynaecologist Robert Michel. Some providers of abortion pills purchased them overseas and sold them for R1,500. The native plant Ochrosia parviflora, known as bwa sousouri, is used to induce abortion.
