= Abortion in Burundi =

In Burundi, abortion is illegal except in cases of risk to life or health. Illegal abortions are punishable by prison or fines. The country's abortion law is based on that of France and was changed in 1981 to add a requirement that social factors be considered when prosecuting abortion cases. In the 2010s and 2020s, activists have supported abortion reform in response to high rates of illegal abortion and rape; other activists, as well as an ambassador, have supported the existing law. Most abortions in the country are illegal, either self-induced or provided by folk healers or unauthorized medical providers. Unsafe abortion is common.

== Legislation ==
The penal code of Burundi prohibits abortion. Article 511 removes criminal penalties if the pregnancy poses a threat to the life or health of the mother. Such an abortion must be performed by a physician and have the written approval of another physician. It does not specify a gestational limit. The law requires that prosecution of abortions account for the pregnant woman's social condition, which may classify it as permitting abortions on socioeconomic grounds. According to the Guttmacher Institute, this provision exists to account for particular cultural practices.

The penal code punishes providing, receiving, or inciting an illegal abortion with a prison sentence of one to two years and a fine of 20,000 to 50,000 francs. The sentence is increased to twenty years if the procedure is fatal. Medical professionals who illegally provide abortions face an increased sentence of two to five years and 50,000 to 500,000 francs. Burundi has not ratified the Maputo Protocol, which provides a right to abortion, as of 2016.

== History ==
Burundi's abortion law is based on that of France and contains some phrasing from the French Penal Code of 1810. In the nineteenth century, the abortions using quinine were documented in the region. Burundi's abortion law was enacted in 1981, adding the provision for the consideration of social conditions.

During the Burundian Civil War, United Nations aid workers began providing reproductive health services in 1996, but they did not provide abortions. Burundi's healthcare system deteriorated in the aftermath of the war. Many maternal health workers considered this to result in an increase in unsafe abortion and abortion death, according to a 2015 study. The Association of Women fighting against HIV/AIDS and Malaria (SFBSLP), a Burundian advocacy group, has campaigned for the legalization of abortion on certain grounds, noting the rate of illegal abortions. The country's high rate of rape in the 2010s also led women's rights groups to advocate for legal abortion for rape victims. Other activists—such as the president of the National Federation of Associations Defending Children's Rights, Jacques Nshimirimana—supported the existing ban, saying it defends fetal rights. At a meeting of the United Nations General Assembly in December 2024, the ambassador of Burundi, Zéphyrin Maniratanga, voiced support for the country's abortion ban and condemned the UN's promotion of sexual and reproductive health, saying, "We do not agree that abortion can be characterized as safe."

== Prevalence ==
In 2015–2019, Burundi had an estimated annual rate of 582,000 abortions, comprising 26% of unintended pregnancies or 11% of all pregnancies. The abortion rate had decreased by 39% since 1990–1994, when the proportion of unintended pregnancies that resulted in abortion had been 18%.

SFBSLP reported in 2015 that 93% of abortions in the country are illegal. According to SFBSLP's chair, Esperance Ntirampeba, the requirement for approval of two physicians is difficult to meet, motivating illegal abortions. The group reported in 2016 that illegal abortions were becoming increasingly common, based on data from health centers in the provinces of Bubanza, Bujumbura City, Bujumbura Rural, and Cibitoke. It reported that Bujumbura City had the highest incidence, with 286 cases in August 2016. A 2017 study at Kabezi Hospital found that 61% of emergency obstetric surgical procedures were caused by abortions, indicating a high rate of abortion complications.

According to SFBSLP's Joséphine Muhigirwa Ciza, legal abortions are provided at hospitals using abortion medications or vacuum aspiration, while illegal abortions are provided by folk healers, who charge 20,000 to 30,000 francs (11 to 17 euros), or by medical professionals, who charge over 200,000 francs (110 euros), as of 2015. Ciza also said that women commonly perform self-induced abortions by consuming unsafe medications, inserting sharp objects into the vagina, or inserting chemicals from chilis or cassava stems. A belief exists that benevolent folk healers, umupfumu, can induce "temporary" abortions to enable a pregnant woman to wait for acceptable social conditions to have a baby.
