= Abortion in Cameroon =

Abortion in Cameroon is only legal if the abortion will save the woman's life, the pregnancy gravely endangers the woman's physical or mental health, or the pregnancy is a result of rape.

== Statistics ==
In 1997, a survey in Yaoundé found 20 percent of women aged 20–29 had had at least one abortion. 80 percent of these procedures took place in a medical facility, but they were not always safe, and women often faced complications. The odds that a pregnant woman would seek an abortion were increased if they were educated or had children. Of women reporting past abortions, 40% had two or more. The survey found that 35% of all reported pregnancies in the capital city ended in abortion.

== Abortion access ==
Reports found that abortion and secretive reproductive health services were widespread and made up 40 percent of OB/GYN emergency admissions. However, most access to abortion clinics were limited to urban centers within the country.
