= Abortion in Chad =

Abortion in Chad was prohibited by law prior to December 2016, when the National Assembly of Chad passed an updated penal code decriminalising abortion under limited circumstances. Article 358 of that code states that abortion is allowed in case of pregnancy resulting from sexual assault, rape, or incest or when the pregnancy endangers the mental or physical health or the life of the mother or the fetus. On 8 May 2017, the new penal code was enacted by President Idriss Deby. It became law on 1 August 2017.
