= Abortion in Nigeria =

Abortion is a controversial topic in Nigeria. Abortion in Nigeria is governed by the two laws that differ greatly depending on geographical location. Northern Nigeria is governed by The Penal Code and Southern Nigeria is governed by The Criminal Code. The only legal way to have an abortion in Nigeria is if having the child is going to put the mother's life in danger. However, sex-selective abortion has long had acceptance in Nigeria.

== Nigerian Law ==
Nigeria's abortion laws make it one of the most restrictive countries regarding abortion. Nigeria's criminal law system is divided between the northern and southern states of Nigeria.

The Criminal Code is currently enforced in the southern states. The abortion laws of the Criminal Code are expressed within sections 228, 229, and 230. Section 228 states that any doctor who acts with the intention to cause a miscarriage to a woman is guilty of a felony, with conviction of the charge carrying up to 14 years of imprisonment. Section 229 states that any woman obtaining a miscarriage is guilty of a felony and may be sentenced to imprisonment for up to 7 years. Section 230 states that anyone supplying anything intended for a woman's miscarriage is also guilty of a felony and may be sentenced to up to 3 years of imprisonment.

The Penal Code operates in northern states, with abortion laws contained in sections 232, 233, and 234. The sections of the Penal Code parallel the Criminal Code, besides the exception for abortion with the purpose of saving the life of the mother. The Penal Code's punishments include imprisonment, fine, or both. The offenses of these codes are punishable regardless of whether the miscarriage was successful. No provisions in the Criminal Code provide exceptions for the preservations of the mother's life. However, the cases of Rex vs Edgar and Rex vs Bourne have made it generally acceptable that abortion performed to preserve the mother's life is not a transgression of the Criminal Code.

== Statistics ==
Many Nigerian women seek unsafe abortion methods to avoid criminal and social penalties, leading to abortion-related complications and increasing mortality and morbidity rates in the country. According to research done by the Guttmacher Institute, an estimated 456,000 unsafe abortions are done in Nigeria every year. In a joint study carried out by the Society of Gynecologists and Obstetricians of Nigeria and Nigeria's Ministry of Health, the number of women who engage in unsafe abortion was estimated at 20,000 each year. Research has revealed that only 40% of abortions are performed by physicians with improved health facilities while the remaining percentage are performed by non-physicians. A 2020 study of Nigerian abortion experiences found that most respondents were non-Catholic Christians.

== History ==
Throughout history, Nigeria's abortion laws have mobilized several groups and movements with opposing missions regarding the liberalization of abortion laws and the promotion of women's rights. In the 1972 conference of the Nigerian Medical Association (NMA), the first attempts were made to reform abortion laws in Nigeria. However, a lack of support caused no revisions to result from this attempt. In 1975, the National Population Council further advocated for women's access to safe and legal abortion on the basis of promoting the health and well-being of the mother. Defended by the NMA and the Society of Gynecologists and Obstetricians of Nigeria (SOGON), this sparked a controversy in 1976. At the yearly SOGON convention, the Prime Minister of Health gave a speech noting the possibility of national reform of abortion laws.

In 1981, the National Council of Women's Societies countered SOGON's proposed bill regarding the termination of pregnancy, preventing it from reaching the House of Representatives. The National Council of Women's Societies expressed that more efforts should be put towards family planning education and prevention of pregnancy outside of marriage. They expected the parents of the House to enforce strong moral values for the country. In 1998, the Women's Health Research Network of Nigeria emerged with the purpose of promoting research and encouraging other groups to advocate and unite around women's health issues.

The Campaign Against Unwanted Pregnancy (CAUP) was created in 1991 with the mission of defending women's sexual and reproductive rights and eliminating unsafe abortion. In 1992, CAUP organized a reform meeting in which the Minister of Health and NMA president reviewed legislation regarding abortion. However, this reform was met with much opposition and was not successful. An important goal of the CAUP is public health education. In 1997, they established the Action Group for Adolescent Health (AGAH), in which they trained medical students to become public educators on sexual and reproductive health. From 1999 to 2004, CAUP organized many workshops and lectures on sexual health and women's rights with the hope of empowering Nigerian citizens with the knowledge to lead a healthy lifestyle and advocate for change. The focus of CAUP since 2002 has been abortion bill reform. A group of experts collaborated to outline changes in 2003. As of 2004, the bill was in its eighth stage of revision.

In 2015 The Violence Against Persons Prohibition Act (VAPP) was passed into law. This act is meant to provide sexual assault and relationship violence survivors with aid. This act is helping women get the contraceptives they need to prevent unwanted pregnancy, the leading cause of abortions.

Despite the combined and continued efforts of various Nigerian and International advocacy groups, only a woman whose life is endangered can undergo a legally performed abortion today.

== Practices and Consequences ==
Many regions in Africa are known for their unsafe practices in health care and disease, specifically when it comes to young pregnant women and abortion. A major problem in these regions is that access to adequate health care is limited, meaning that options for safe healthcare practices are not easily accessible, and some turn to unsafe methods of handling their pregnancies. Abortion accounts for 40% of maternal deaths in Nigeria, making it the second leading cause of maternal mortality in the country.

Healthcare systems in African countries have failed to make the proper changes to ensure a better future for their citizens. The government has either failed to make these issues a priority or they have attempted to introduce policies that had the opposite result of what was desired. Specifically in Nigeria, religious and cultural factors are major reasons behind the failure to address certain abortion issues.

Many of the issues surrounding unsafe abortion focus on adolescents. Although unsafe abortion practices do affect most of the sexually active women in the country, it is believed that adolescents may require special circumstances and could be a reason for change in this area. Adolescents are the most in need of these services; if they adopt safe practices to avoid unplanned pregnancies, these problems could start to decline. In Nigeria, teens are the most likely not to use contraceptives to avoid pregnancy and the most likely to turn to unsafe abortion practices.

Contraceptive use is a common issue for teens in Nigeria and there are no services to support this. Contraceptives are an important resource in a community where abortion and high fertility is an issue.

The need for increased access to safe abortion practices in Nigeria is very apparent. There are several different methods used to try to ensure a healthy and safe approach to abortions, but Nigeria has not always been able to keep up with the costs of these medical advances. In Nigeria, there are three first-trimester safe practices that are utilized to compare costs and effectiveness. Hospital-based dilatation and curettage, hospital-and clinic-based manual vacuum aspiration, and medical abortion using misoprostol are all considered to be huge cost savings and ultimately in the mother's best interest.

Prior to women practicing these medically safer and more cost-effective methods, the rate of self-induced abortions was extremely high relative to other countries and regions. The side effects of using other methods have proved to be damaging to the mothers, resulting in high fevers, urinary tract infections, and genital trauma.

There are also issues where the women who did induce their own abortions did so incorrectly and could have caused other complications by overdosing on misoprostol – a method that is most commonly used safely and cost effectively. An important aspect to take into consideration is that Nigeria is a region where there are low health system requirements and where they strive to use non-surgical options.

=== Forced abortions by the Nigerian Army ===
In 2022, Reuters reported that the Nigerian military conducted a mass-abortion program at least since 2013 in Northeastern Nigeria, where women separated from Islamic insurgents who had impregnated them. Over 10,000 pregnancies have been terminated without the mothers' knowledge or consent. The women were forcibly administered abortion-inducing injections and pills without being told what the medications were for, and after the abortion was completed they were told not to tell anyone about it. Some women died in these forced abortions, despite the procedures being carried out by medical professionals. Some of the women stated they would not have chosen to have an abortion if given a choice. Forced abortions were illegal under both civilian and military laws in Nigeria.

== Causes for abortion ==
Unwanted pregnancies are the leading causes of abortions in Nigeria. Unwanted pregnancies have many causes. Nigeria's growing economy and increasing urbanisation are making the price of living higher. This is making it more necessary for women to be working, as well as men, to help support the family. When there are more children it becomes harder for the women to concentrate on their works because they are expected to take care of the family first, thus women would rather be working than being pregnant or taking care of their children.

Another reason for the high rates of unwanted pregnancies in Nigeria is lack of family planning which cause most women not to take contraceptives. This is as a result that most women lack the education on the use of contraceptives, as well as they lack access to health care units and the use of the contraceptive products in Nigeria.

For women live in rural areas, healthcare centres are spread out from one another and are hard to find. The government does not care to make campaigns to help educate the public on family planning and contraceptives.

On average, Nigeria has a birth rate of around 4.4 children per woman. They have 25 years from the ages of 20-45 where they are most likely to get pregnant. As such, they have a long span of their life where an unwanted pregnancy can take place.

== See also ==
- Women in Nigeria
- Health in Nigeria
