= Abortion in Ethiopia =

In 2005, the Ethiopian Parliament liberalised the abortion law to grant safe abortions to women in specific circumstances.

Currently, abortion is legal in Ethiopia in cases of rape, incest, or maternal problems relating to foetal impairment.

Since 2008, Ethiopia has witnessed a rapid increase in healthcare facilities which provide legal abortion services. Abortions services in Ethiopian facilities includes medical abortion (using misoprostol and Mifepristone), surgical abortion, manual vacuum aspiration and dilation and curettage.

In 2008, an estimated 382,500 induced abortions were performed in Ethiopia, for an annual rate of 23 abortions per 1,000 women aged 15–44. This doubled the proportion in 2014, with rate of 53% (some 326,000) of all health facilities. Most abortions occur in non-governmental organization and private hospitals within Ethiopia.

== History ==
Ethiopia is the second most populated country in Sub-Saharan Africa (SSA). A central issue concerning the safety of its population is the access to health care including abortion services.

Historically, access to abortion in Sub-Saharan Africa has created controversy amongst some members of the public and its healthcare professionals, due to existing religious practices and traditional beliefs. There exists a lack of medical knowledge and a cultural stigma surrounding the process of abortion.

From 1980 to 1999, the main cause of maternal mortality in Ethiopia, at 31%, was the unsafe nature or complications regarding abortion.

In 1994, the International Conference on Population and Development (ICPD), organised by the United Nations, remarked on the need to reduce unsafe abortions in order to tackle these maternal mortality rates. Following this conference, African nations began to encourage the liberalisation of abortion laws. African leaders put this in motion by updating national laws and policies, providing service-delivery rules and regulations, medical training programmes and community outreach programmes.

The journey to safe abortions gained relevance within Ethiopia's political agenda throughout the 1990s. However, various religious practices in Ethiopia soon expressed their resistance to these plans. The 2007 census demonstrates that 43.5% of citizens identified as Orthodox Christian, 33.9% identified as Muslim and 18.5% identified as Protestant Christian. A study conducted in the same year showed that 67% considered induced abortion as 'never justifiable'.

However, with Ethiopia's rapidly growing population, a Population Policy goal was implemented in 1993 to stabilise the rate of population alongside the economic growth. This Policy came to existence during a transition from the Imperial and Military regimes in Ethiopia, during which population and the reproductive health movement had largely been neglected as a national concern. The policy's crucial goals were to reduce the fertility rate from 7.7 to 4, and promote the use of modern contraception among married women who were of child-bearing age from less than 5% to 44%. Before 1993, the Ethiopian Government played a role in actively discouraging the administration and use of contraception. Hence, with this Population Policy, Ethiopia adopted the principle of providing safe abortions and seeking planned pregnancy.

Three years after the legalisation of abortion in Ethiopia, the WHO found that unsafe abortions contributed to 18% of maternal mortality in East Africa, a significant improvement from the previous 31%. By 2014, the maternal mortality caused by unsafe abortions in Ethiopia had declined to 10%.

== Legality ==
In 2005, Ethiopia legalized abortion in cases of rape, incest, or foetal impairment. Woman can legally terminate her pregnancy if the pregnancy or childbirth endanger her life. Although abortion is prohibited by Criminal Code, the Ethiopian Parliament approved it in the following circumstances:

- When the pregnancy results from rape or incest
- When continuance of the pregnancy endangers the health or life of the woman or the fetus
- In cases of fetal abnormalities
- For women with physical or mental disabilities
- For minors who are physically or psychologically unprepared to raise a child
- In the case of grave and imminent danger that can be averted only through immediate pregnancy termination

A woman can terminate the pregnancy upon a difficulty of giving birth owing to minor or physical disability. However, the law engendered almost six in ten unsafe abortions in Ethiopia. In 2006, the government started a national standard for safe abortion guideline that utilizes medications (such as misoprostol with or without mifepristone) to terminate pregnancies, in accordance with World Health Organization (WHO) clinical recommendations on safe abortion. Available abortion services are:

- Medical abortion (Cytotec, misoprostol, Mifepristone)
- Surgical abortion
- Manual vacuum aspiration (MVA)
- Dilation and curettage (D&C)

== Incidents ==
In 2008, an estimated 382,500 induced abortions were performed in Ethiopia, for annual rate of 23 abortions per 1,000 women aged 15–44. The abortion rate in Ethiopia was lower than in African and Eastern African countries which has 29% and 39% respectively according to WHO estimates. In urban areas, abortions rates are higher than the national average, such as Addis Ababa, Dire Dawa and Harar. Factors for these conditions include greater social and healthcare provision attracting women in these areas.

Some of 35% women tend to undergo induced abortion whereas 27% of those obtaining post-abortion care report having had a previous abortion. In 2014, about 620,300 abortions were performed in Ethiopia, corresponding to annual rate of 28 abortions per 1,000 women aged 15–49, an increase from 22 per 1,000 in 2008.

=== Provision of abortion and post-abortion care ===
In 2008, about 27% women induced abortions were safe performed by health facilities. However, 15% (58,000 abortions) reported safe despite lack of clear survey from private and public hospitals. Some of these practices were legal and mostly performed by private and small facilities; about half of all health facilities provided induced abortions in Ethiopia. The proportion is higher than for public hospitals (76%) and private or non-governmental facilities (63%) than for public health centers (41%).

This proportion is likely fluctuating, as there are abortion services in public facilities. Currently, private and NGO facilities mostly provide induced abortion aboard. Access to second trimester abortions is severely limited, in which 9–10% of all facilities only provide these services.

In 2014, legally performed induced abortions reached 53% (some 326,200) in all health facilities, nearly double the proportion in 2008 (27%). Between 2008 and 2014, shared abortion rate increased from zero to more than one-third.

=== Unintended pregnancy and contraception ===
Modern contraceptive adoption is much higher in Addis Ababa (57% among women aged 15–44) than in Ethiopia as whole (14%), while in rural areas it is below national average (3–16%). One of the root causes of abortion is the low level of contraceptive methods, which leads to unintended pregnancy. 13% of unintended pregnancy ended in 2014, up slightly from 10% in 2008.

== Public Opinion ==
Despite the legalisation of abortion in 2005, many women in Ethiopia demonstrate little knowledge when it comes to the abortion process. This is due to a combination of factors including religious practices, cultural barriers, public stigma and moral beliefs that inherently value the life of the foetus.

A survey of women between the ages of 15-49 from Bahir Dar in North-Eastern Ethiopia shows that two-thirds were aware of the 2005 law, but 57% remained under-educated as to its purposes.

A community-based cross-sectional survey from 2017 found that a woman's age can determine the level of knowledge held regarding the abortion law. Similarly, the woman's occupation can determine the attitude towards the abortion law. Overall, those with a lack of knowledge towards the abortion law are found likely to possess a conservative attitude towards abortion. This highlights the nation's need for further education across all ages to break down the stigma and conservative attitudes concerning abortion in Ethiopia.
