= Abortion in the Central African Republic =

Abortion in the Central African Republic is prohibited by law unless the pregnancy is the result of rape. According to general medical practice, the medical procedure is only legal if the abortion will save the woman's life, though this is not explicitly stated in any law. Anyone who performs an abortion faces up to five years in prison and a fine, and physicians risk losing their medical licenses for up to five years.

== History ==
Prior to 2006, law in the Central African Republic explicitly outlawed abortion. In 2006, the National Assembly legalized abortion in cases of rape, as women regularly faced sexual violence, rape, and gang rape in the war-ravaged country.

=== Women's health implications ===
Women with unwanted pregnancies in the Central African Republic do not have legal access to abortion. They still seek reproductive health care, but Doctors Without Borders says that the women often resort to conditions that are not sterile or medically safe.

According to the International Campaign for Women's Right to Safe Abortion, "unsafe abortions are the leading cause of maternal mortality" in CAR. The group added that "one-third of maternal mortality iscaused by unsafe abortions (MMR: 882 deaths per 100,000 live births). Each day, six women die as a result of their pregnancy or childbirth".
