= Abortion in Burkina Faso =

Abortion in Burkina Faso is only legal in the following circumstances;

1. If the abortion will save the woman's life
2. If the pregnancy gravely endangers the woman's physical or mental health
3. If the child will potentially be born with an incurable disease
4. In pregnancy cases resulting from rape or incest, so long as it is proven by a state prosecutor.

Even these abortions are limited to the first ten weeks of pregnancy.

In Burkina Faso, any abortion performed under other conditions subjects the person who performs the procedure subject to one to five years imprisonment and imposition of a fine of 300,000 to 1,500,000 CFA francs.

== Impact of restricted abortion laws ==
In the early 1990s, at least 5% of women admitted into healthcare facilities for maternal health concerns had life-threatening complications from unsafe abortions, and 70% of these women were between 16 and 24 years of age. During the same time period, 35% of women who sought medical treatment for infertility had previously been recipients of an illegal abortion.

The inability to receive treatment for abortion complications can have severe repercussions, as abortion complications contribute 10-18% of maternal mortality, which at 330 per 100,000 births remains well above SDG 2030 goals. Women’s abortion experiences are considerably shaped by structural inequities related to gender and wealth.
