= Post-abortion care =

Medical treatment and counseling after abortion

Post-abortion care (PAC) is treatment and counseling for post-abortion women. It includes curative care, such as treating abortion complications, as well as preventative care, such as providing birth control to prevent future unwanted pregnancies. Post-abortion care reduces morbidity and mortality associated with abortion.

== Prevalence ==
Approximately 75 million women require post-abortion care annually following induced and spontaneous abortion (miscarriage). All countries have committed to reducing pregnancy-related mortality by providing treatment for abortion complications, regardless if the abortion was illegally obtained. However, an analysis of ten countries (Bangladesh, Haiti, Kenya, Malawi, Namibia, Nepal, Rwanda, Senegal, Tanzania, and Uganda) found that in seven of ten, less than 10% of primary facilities could provide basic post-abortion care. No primary healthcare facilities in Namibia provided post-abortion care; Malawi, with greatest prevalence, offered post-abortion care at 29% of primary facilities.

== Elements ==
The curative care aspect of PAC includes treating incomplete abortions by removing any fetal or maternal tissues remaining in the uterus. This can include using vacuum aspiration (suction) or curettage (scraping). Aspiration results in shorter procedure times, less pain, and less blood loss than curettage. The drug misoprostol is an alternative to manual removal and is another option for treating incomplete abortion.

For preventative care, women are provided family planning counseling and services, as most women seeking PAC were not using modern contraceptives at the time of conception. A study in Zimbabwe found that family planning counseling was associated with a significant reduction in unwanted pregnancies and repeat abortions in the year after they received post-abortion care. Infrequently, sexual health screenings such as HIV testing are provided as part of post-abortion care, though sexually transmitted infection screening is low and has been identified as an unmet need of PAC.

== History ==
The term "post-abortion care" was first defined in the 1991 by the non-governmental organization (NGO) Ipas. In 1993, Ipas joined Jhpiego, EngenderHealth, Pathfinder International, and International Planned Parenthood Federation, in creating the Postabortion Care Consortium.

In 1994, a post-abortion care model was articulated by the Postabortion Care Consortium, with three key elements, regardless of the legality of abortion in a given country: 1) emergency treatment for abortion-related complications; 2) postabortion family planning counseling and services; and 3) linkage between emergency care and other reproductive health services, such as management of sexually transmitted diseases. The PAC model was adopted by United States Agency for International Development (USAID) in 1994. In 2002, two elements were added relating to counseling and community involvement. The first research compendium on post-abortion care was published in 2007 by USAID, What Works, A Policy and Program Guide to the Evidence on Postabortion Care.
