= Abortion in the Democratic Republic of the Congo =

In the Democratic Republic of the Congo (DRC), abortion is legal in cases of risk to life or fetal defects, as established by legislation, with additional grounds established by the Maputo Protocol, though abortion is completely criminalized by the country's penal code. As an international treaty incorporated as law, the Maputo Protocol takes precedence over domestic law, and the country's abortion guidelines reflect its legal grounds of rape, incest, and risk to physical or mental health (up to fetal viability). However, the medical code of ethics includes only the grounds established by legislation. Illegal providers continue to exist, and unsafe abortion is common.

As a Belgian colony, the DRC inherited Belgium's abortion ban, which was kept after independence. A 1970 presidential act of Mobutu Sese Seko permitted abortions in cases that risked death or fetal defects, with physician approval, though this did not overturn the legislation. The abortion debate became a prominent subject in the country around 2006, amid reports of unsafe abortion and of violence against women during the country's civil wars. The country ratified the Maputo Protocol by 2009. Supported by the Ministry of Gender, activists called for the treaty to be published within the country's government gazette to become law. This occurred in March 2018, followed by a government circular by the Superior Council of the Judiciary saying that the treaty should be enforced. The same year, a public health law legalized abortion on the grounds of risk to life and fetal defects, narrower than the Maputo Protocol. The Ministry of Public Health established abortion guidelines in 2020, following the Maputo Protocol.

The DRC, especially Kinshasa, has had a high abortion rate since before the procedure was legal. Factors include a high rate of unintended pregnancy—sometimes caused by sexual violence—and a stigma surrounding premarital pregnancy. Most surgical abortions at public facilities use the non-recommended dilation and curettage method, while medical abortions are allowed to be performed at home with pills available at pharmacies. Legal abortion access is limited and geographically unequal. Illegal abortions are performed using traditional methods, mostly in urban clinics. Post-abortion care is required to be available at public facilities, and a 2017 initiative led to its availability from midwives. Abortion is opposed by many Christians in the country, and several of the country's cultures view it as taboo.

== Legislation ==
The DRC has three conflicting abortion laws: the country's penal code completely criminalizes abortion, a public health law permits abortion only if the pregnancy threatens the life of the mother or risks birth defects, and the Maputo Protocol—a treaty incorporated as law in the DRC—permits abortion on additional grounds. As the Constitution of the Democratic Republic of the Congo declares the primacy of international law, the Maputo Protocol takes precedence. Contradictions between the public health law and the Maputo Protocol lead to confusion about the legal status of abortion. As of 2019, the dominant legal interpretation remains that abortion is illegal. Article 32 of the country's medical code of ethics includes the same grounds as the public health law; this is followed by most medical providers, as of 2021.

The Maputo Protocol and the Comprehensive Abortion Care Standards and Guidelines permit abortion in cases of a pregnancy from incest or rape (Note: Sex with a minor is classified as statutory rape, so all minors can legally have abortions.) or if there is a risk to health. The guidelines use the World Health Organization's definition of "a state of complete physical, mental and social well-being and not merely absence of disease or infirmity", thus allowing abortions on mental health or socioeconomic grounds. It also allows abortions for women with conditions that may threaten the fetus or may be intensified by pregnancy. No legal proof is required in the case of rape or incest.

Legal abortions must be approved by three physicians. Minors who receive abortions require approval from a parent or other representative, though the medical code of ethics authorizes physicians to treat minors without approval if necessary. (Note: According to some sources, the guidelines removed requirements for third-party approval.) The country recommends, but does not require, spousal consent. Conscientious objection to abortion and to other medical procedures is allowed. The abortion guidelines establish that abortions may be performed up to fetal viability, defined as a gestational age of 28 weeks. Medical abortions using misoprostol (alone or in combination with mifepristone) are approved up to this limit; such drugs must be prescribed and provided by healthcare facilities. Surgical abortions using dilation and evacuation are approved up to 13 to 16 weeks, while vacuum aspiration and dilation and curettage are approved up to 13 weeks, though the latter is discouraged.

Articles 165 and 166 of the penal code respectively set prison sentences of five to fifteen years for the provider and five to ten years for the recipient. Article 178 prohibits promotion or advertising of abortion, punishable by eight days to one year in prison and a fine of 25 to 1,000 zaires. Before abortion was decriminalized through the Maputo Protocol, criminal penalties applied to abortion in all cases, with a legal principle generally permitting life-saving abortions. The African Union noted in 2023 that, as these articles remain in the penal code, the country has not taken legislative action toward the Maputo Protocol's right to abortion.

== History ==
=== Abortion ban ===
Belgian Congo initially inherited Belgium's abortion law, with a total ban on birth control and non-life-saving abortion in the territory's 1940 penal code. The territory's law was based on the Belgian Penal Code of 1867—in turn based on the Napoleonic Code of 1810—which included an abortion ban, generally interpreted to permit only life-saving abortions. After the DRC's independence, its penal code kept the abortion law of the Napoleonic Code.

By a 1970 presidential decree of Mobutu Sese Seko, the country's code of medical ethics added exceptions for abortions in "exceptional cases" that risked maternal death or fetal defects. This allowed conscientious objection and required that abortions be approved by three physicians. These restrictions and the dearth of medical providers in the country hindered access to abortion. A legal ambiguity also existed as the penal code's abortion ban remained; as the penal code was issued by the legislative branch, it could not be overturned by the executive branch. Birth control was partly legalized, but only for birth spacing, by a parliamentary decree signed by Mobutu in 1973. By 1990, a legal principle permitted abortions if a family's socioeconomic status prevented it from having another baby.

Abortion was widespread in the 1990s and 2000s, when 15% of women who had ever been pregnant had had abortions. After the failure of a family planning program launched in the 1980s, the government again began to prioritize family planning around 2006. In the aftermath of a series of civil wars, rebuilding healthcare and social services was a key point in that year's election. Reports of violence against women during the wars sparked activism for the rights of the victims. This brought the abortion debate into mainstream political discourse, fueled by widespread reports of unsafe abortion. At the time, the law did not specify legal grounds for abortion, but life-saving abortions were excused under the defense of necessity.

=== Maputo Protocol ===
Amid a post-war commitment to human rights in the country, the DRC signed the African Union's Maputo Protocol—the first international treaty to include a right to abortion—on 5 December 2003 and ratified it on 9 June 2008, which was finalized on 9 February 2009. The Ministry of Gender sought to have it codified in the Official Journal (the country's government gazette), which would allow it to become law. The ratification of Article 14, which required government support for abortions on health grounds, was opposed by some groups. The Catholic Church, supporting the right to life, led a movement against the treaty's codification, which was influential on public opinion. Religious opposition and stigmatization surrounding abortion contributed to a lack of political incentive to bring the country's law in line with the treaty.

As the DRC adhered to the legal approach of monism, it was bound to international treaties, so activists held the legal argument that the implementation of Article 14 could overturn the national abortion ban. Opponents of this argument argued that the treaty contradicted national law and societal and legal practices. The monist argument was supported by the Manual for Judges by Charles Ngwena, a work of comparative law that said courts have a duty to protect women's rights, and by a general comment by the African Commission on Human and People's Rights, which established medical practices to protect bodily autonomy. Alongside legal studies by Ipas and Pathfinder International, constitutional scholars supported the application of Article 14 as the easiest way to implement abortion reform.

A coalition of civil society groups, Coalition de Lutte Contre les Grossesses Non Désirées (CNGD), was founded in 2016, connecting international organizations and other groups interested in abortion reform. It backed the Ministry of Gender in its goal of codification and highlighted the country's commitment to the law of the AU. Coalition Article 14 was also formed with this goal. Another advocacy group, formed in 2012, instead aimed to decriminalize abortion through a reproductive health law. As the group felt it would be difficult to pass such a law on its own, its proposal was incorporated into the 2018 public health law. The Vice Prime Minister also proposed legalizing abortion as a measure against child abandonment. Anti-abortion movements said that the practice violated the country's social mores.

Groups supporting the legalization of abortion focused on the lack of data on unsafe abortion in the country. A 2016 study by the Guttmacher Institute and the University of Kinshasa's School of Public Health and a 2017 study by Ipas and the Ministry of Public Health were the first to quantify unsafe abortion in the country and its correlation with maternal mortality. Several public events presented this research, alongside firsthand reports of unsafe abortion, to stakeholders unfamiliar with the Maputo Protocol. Discussions led by the Ministry of Public Health and CNGD argued that abortion was a right as well as a public health issue, while discussions by scholars of African legal history and feminist history contributed to arguments of bodily autonomy. With stakeholders being educated about the history of the abortion law and the contemporary state of abortion, the subject entered discourse beyond that of rights activists. Meanwhile, the public associated unsafe abortion with sexual violence in conflicts in the eastern region.

The Cabinet published the Maputo Protocol in the Official Journal on 24 March 2018. A government circular was issued on 6 April by the presidents of the Constitutional Court and the Superior Council of the Judiciary, mandating that courts use the Maputo Protocol as law, thus decriminalizing abortion. These actions were the first in Francophone Africa to largely increase abortion access. In December 2018, titled Law No. 18/035 or "Fixing Basic Principles Relating to the Organization of Public Health", legalized abortion in cases of risk to life or fetal defects, with an executive decree acknowledging the Maputo Protocol. It was not in line with the treaty, which included the grounds of rape, incest, or risk to health. By 2019, the Maputo Protocol was well known in major cities but not in rural areas, according to activist Anny Modi.

After the circular, the Ministry of Public Health led a committee to draft national abortion standards, established by the Superior Council of the Judiciary. Ipas coordinated a meeting between the committee and the government of Tunisia to study the country's abortion model. The committee based its draft on guidelines of international organizations—such as WHO, the International Confederation of Midwives, and the International Federation of Gynecology and Obstetrics—and examined those of other African countries with legal abortion. The committee faced disagreements over requirements evidence in sexual assault cases and parental consent for minors. After a series of workshops receiving public suggestions for the draft, the Standards and Guidelines for Comprehensive Woman-Centered Abortion Care in DRC were finalized in February 2020 and received ethical approval from the Ministry of Public Health in December 2020. In line with the Maputo Protocol and recommendations for best practices, it was one of the most progressive abortion guidelines on the continent, avoiding narrow requirements for legal evidence or third-party approval.

Due to the existence of contradictory laws, members of parliament, including Solange Masumbuko, proposed a new abortion bill in 2020. The Ministry of Public Health created a "roadmap" through discussions on how to provide abortion care in the country's limited health system. Abortion was also added to curricula for medical and nursing students, and the government worked with the Congolese Midwives' Association to enable midwives to perform abortion services.

== Prevalence ==
Estimates of the DRC's abortion rate vary. As of 2023, the government does not have official abortion statistics. According to the Guttmacher Institute, the annual abortion rate in 2015–2019 was 4,730,000, equating to 28% of unintended pregnancies, which in turn comprised 45% of pregnancies. This rate had increased by 27% since 1990–1994, when it had comprised a similar proportion of unintended pregnancies. According to the 2023–2024 national health survey, 7.5% of women under 20 have had abortions. The DRC has a high rate of unsafe abortion. This contributes to its maternal mortality rate, one of the highest in the world.

As of 2023, two-thirds of abortions at public facilities use the dilation and curettage (D&C) method, which is not recommended by the WHO. In 2017—before decriminalization—four-fifths of hospitals in the country provided abortion. However, most primary health facilities, which are more common than hospitals, do not. As of 2018, an estimated 31% of healthcare facilities in the DRC have adequate staffing and materials to provide abortions, though only 4% have the capacity for post-abortion care (PAC), and only 1% could provide comprehensive abortion care.

Medical abortion is available from healthcare facilities, NGOs, doulas, and other providers. It is allowed to be performed at home if monitored by authorized providers. Misoprostol has been on the country's essential medicines list since 2012 and mifepristone since 2019 or 2020. A combination pack of the two has been available at pharmacies since 2017. Many providers lack medical abortion services, particularly in rural areas. Government-approved training manuals include medical abortion. Training is received at all levels of public healthcare facilities, and it is often conducted by NGOs.

Abortion access in the DRC is limited by confusion surrounding its legality, with many providers considering it a legal risk. It is also limited by a lack of resources within the country's health system. Availability varies regionally, with higher capacity for abortion in urban areas. The capital city of Kinshasa has an abortion rate twice as high as the rural province of Kongo Central, according to a 2023 estimate, despite similar rates of contraception. Surgical abortion is the most common method in Kinshasa, while medical abortion is more common in Kongo Central, which has a smaller proportion of health facilities that provide abortions. Illegal abortions continued after decriminalization as many people are unaware of the change and the legal threat remains. Desire to keep it secret also motivates illegal abortions. Most illegal abortions are from small clinics in cities. Methods used by illegal providers include drinking herbal mixtures using the abortifacient plant kongo bololo or vaginal insertion of cassava branches.

The country had high abortion rates even before decriminalization. Illegal abortions were often received from unsafe providers without medical training, and safe abortion was rarely available, even in legally permitted cases. Self-induced abortions were also common, typically using products acquired from markets. Abortions were particularly common in Kinshasa. A study estimated that the city had 146,713 abortions in 2016—comprising one-quarter of pregnancies—of which 34% resulted in PAC. Adolescents had the highest abortion rate in the city, comprising 19% of cases. In eastern DRC, abortion access was limited by attacks from militants as well as stigmatization, illegality, and inability to afford the cost, which ranged from 40 to 300 US dollars as of 2020. (Note: Another estimate placed the cost at 160 to 200 euros in 2017.) No health centers in the region reported providing the procedure in 2015, and abortion was often self-induced using herbs such as cimpokolo or medications such as quinine. In the city of Kananga, 3.5% of pregnancies at the Provincial General Hospital resulted in illegal abortions from 2015 to 2019. Punishments for illegal abortions were enforced, including six cases in Lubumbashi in 2016.

The DRC has a high rate of unintended pregnancies, exacerbated by gender norms that expect husbands to make decisions about sex and childbirth. Many unintended pregnancies result from sexual violence—frequently occurring in conflict zones—or prostitution; the stigmas about such situations often motivate abortions. Abortion is also common among pregnancies that face stigmas, such as if a woman is unmarried or does not know who the father is. Such stigmas often cause women to hesitate to request abortions or to keep their abortions secret. The desire to hide abortions drives some to avoid safe abortion providers or PAC. Lower-class women are more likely to face abortion complications or to lack PAC.

== Post-abortion care ==
The DRC's health policy requires that hospitals and health centres provide post-abortion care (PAC) using manual vacuum aspiration as well as misoprostol. Like other elements of healthcare, the country has a low rate of PAC, despite a high rate of abortion complications. A PAC plan launched in 2017 led to increased use of the MVA method and decreased use of D&C in several hospitals. This included MVA training for midwives through a program by the Congolese Midwives' Association and the Ministry of Public Health, whereas D&C had only been provided by physicians. After the decriminalization of abortion, in Kinshasa and Kongo Central, the availability of PAC increased in public facilities but decreased in private facilities.

When abortion was illegal, the country had large disparities of access to PAC. According to a 2017 WHO study, regions facing conflicts had lower access to PAC but reported an equal level of satisfaction. In North and South Kivu in 2019, most PAC patients reported positive experiences. In Kinshasa, the illegality of abortion led many patients to receive PAC from non-medical providers or not at all; most PAC facilities used D&C and had limited supply of pain medicine.

== Beliefs and debate ==
The DRC has a strong stigma surrounding abortion, influenced by gender norms that expect women to bear children and deny them freedom of choice. The misconception that it is illegal contributes to opposition to abortion, and support for criminal penalties is widespread. Other reasons people oppose abortion include fear of fatal abortions as well as beliefs that abortion violates Christianity or local norms. Such views dominate the abortion debate in the predominantly Catholic country. Women who receive abortions may be socially chastized or ostracized, or labelled as murderers, witches, or prostitutes. The taboo causes those distributing information about abortion to avoid explicitly mentioning it, according to MSI Reproductive Choices.

Cultural attitudes about abortion differ. In Ituri, many people approve of abortion as a health solution, and healthcare workers widely support legal abortion access. In North Kivu, abortion is widely viewed as murder, although it is common. Among the Lega people of South Kivu, abortion is a taboo, yet it is socially accepted in the case that a woman gets pregnant while breastfeeding another child. Many people in North and South Kivu support PAC as a health initiative, regardless of views on abortion. In Kinshasa, a 2022 survey found that most women view abortion as a common practice and support its legality on certain grounds.
