= Contents of the United States diplomatic cables leak (Africa) =

Content from the United States diplomatic cables leak has depicted Sub-Saharan Africa and related subjects extensively. The leak, which began on 28 November 2010, occurred when the website of WikiLeaks — an international new-media non-profit organisation that publishes submissions of otherwise unavailable documents from anonymous news sources and news leaks — started to publish classified documents of detailed correspondence — diplomatic cables — between the United States Department of State and its diplomatic missions around the world. Since the initial release date, WikiLeaks has been releasing further documents.

== Burundi ==
Chemical-weapons cache

In June 2007, the U.S. Embassy in Bujumbura, Burundi, reported that an elderly Congolese man to whom they were introduced had indicated he had found a large quantity of chemical items hidden in a stationary concrete bunker on the same property as where a Belgian family had resided during Burundi's Belgian colonial period. Among the items contained in the bunker —107 miles (172 km) west of Bukavu, Democratic Republic of the Congo — were uranium, ozone and red mercury. A few weeks later, the man re-approached with a Congolese smuggler who said he found the material hidden at an old Belgian colonial building. He had pictures of a wicker basket with a uranium cask inside.

== Democratic Republic of the Congo ==
Kinshasa Nuclear Research Center

A 2006 diplomatic cable from the U.S. Embassy in Kinshasa reports on the poor security at Kinshasa Nuclear Research Center (CREN-K), stating,

"A fence approximately six feet high surrounds some of CREN-K. The fence is constructed of cement in some places and chain-link in others. The fence is not lit at night, has no razor-wire across the top, and is not monitored by video surveillance. There is also no cleared buffer zone between it and the surrounding vegetation. There are numerous holes in the fence, and large gaps where the fence was missing altogether. University of Kinshasa students frequently walk through the fence to cut across CREN-K, and subsistence farmers grow manioc on the facility next to the nuclear waste storage building. No fence separates the nuclear waste storage building and the University of Kinshasa's women's dormitory. The two buildings sit approximately 300 meters ([327 yards]) apart, and one can walk freely from one to the other across the manioc field."

CREN-K had 140 nuclear-fuel rods (LEU) from which two had been stolen in 1998. One of its two nuclear reactors, Triga II, consists of 10.5 kilograms (23 pounds) of non-enriched uranium (U-238) and 5.1 kilograms (11 pounds) of enriched uranium (U-235, enriched to 20 percent).

Vital Kamerhe

In March 2009, according to the U.S. Embassy in Kinshasa, President Joseph Kabila bribed several members of Parliament in order to remove the chairman, Vital Kamerhe. Kamerhe was becoming too critical for the president, and was seen as a rival in the upcoming elections.

== Eritrea ==
U.S. views of Asmara

Ronald K. McMullen, U.S. Ambassador to Eritrea, describes Asmara, Eritrea's capital, as an ill-kept, run-down former Italian colonial outpost where night-time electricity cuts contribute to a sinister, cowed atmosphere reminiscent of an Evelyn Waugh novel.

== Ethiopia ==
Leadership

Former U.S. ambassador Donald Yamamato, saw Ethiopia as a "democratic deficit" example. He viewed Meles Zenawi as shrewd and begging to get world attention to have his ideologies acceptable. The U.S. described him as a ticking time bomb ready to explode and a one-dimensional African strongman who didn't like people getting in his way. George W. Bush labelled him an errand boy, and Angela Merkel viewed him as an economic illiterate. Navi Pillay, the UN high commissioner of human rights, said that journalists, human rights defenders and critics were facing a "climate of intimidation" in Ethiopia. His economic achievements, and his role as an opponent of Islamism in the Horn of Africa, appealed to Western donors despite numerous human rights issues.

== Kenya ==
Corruption

"Kenya could descend into violence worse than the 2008 post-election crisis unless rampant corruption in the ruling elite is tackled", reported Michael Ranneberger, U.S. Ambassador to Kenya.

Chinese military operations

The People's Republic of China was providing military and intelligence support to Kenya with the help of a corrupt official.

Arms shipment

A 2008 diplomatic cable concerning the reaction to the seizure of the cargo ship MV Faina by pirates, along with its cargo of T-72 tanks, anti-aircraft guns and other heavy armaments, describes as a "poorly-kept secret" the fact that the weapons' original destination was to be not Kenya but South Sudan. A 2009 diplomatic cable highlights how the Kenyan government was "understandably confused" by the U.S. reaction and threats of sanctions against Kenya if the shipment were to proceed, since "past transfers had been undertaken in consultation with the United States" and "dove-tailed" with U.S. aims.

== Nigeria ==
Corporate infiltration of government agencies

The Shell Oil Company claimed it had inserted staff into all the main ministries of the Nigerian government, giving it access to every movement of politicians. Ann Pickard, then Shell's vice-president for sub-Saharan Africa boasted that the Nigerian government had "forgotten" about the extent of Shell's infiltration and was unaware of how much the company knew about its deliberations.

Pfizer court case

The drug company Pfizer hired private investigators to find evidence against the Nigerian attorney general Michael Aondoakaa to pressure him into dropping charges against the company. Pfizer was sued in Nigeria over the deaths of children in drug trials.

== Somalia ==
Somali pirate networks

The commander of the Canadian vessel HMCS Ville de Québec, Chris Dickinson, briefed the Canadian High Commissioner to the United Kingdom on his experiences during his command of Canada's lead ship for Combined Task Force 150. During the briefing, the commander had noted that there was clear evidence of collusion between the Somalia's Transitional Federal Government (TFG) and the pirates in Somali waters. He would also note that clear links between the pirates and established terrorist networks exist. Canadian Political Officer Anna Kapellas would relay the information to their American counterparts, although did not offer details on the relationship between the pirates, the TFG, and terrorist networks, saying the information was classified "Canadian Eyes Only."

== Sudan ==
Arms shipment

A 2008 diplomatic cable concerning the reaction to the seizure of MV Faina by pirates, along with its cargo of T-72 tanks, anti-aircraft guns and other heavy armaments, describes as a "poorly-kept secret" the fact that the weapons' original destination was to be not Kenya but South Sudan. A 2009 diplomatic cable highlights how the Kenyan government was "understandably confused" by the U.S. reaction and threats of sanctions against Kenya if the shipment were to proceed, since "past transfers had been undertaken in consultation with the United States" and "dove-tailed" with U.S. aims to convert the SPLA from a guerrilla force into a small conventional army capable of defending Juba, and in addition the U.S. is "continuing military to military security sector reform assistance to the SPLA".

Corruption

Omar al-Bashir, President of Sudan, is alleged to have a "stash" of up to $9bn, possibly in U.K. banks. The International Criminal Court prosecutor suggests public opinion in Sudan would change from his being a "crusader" to a "thief" were this to be made known.

== Uganda ==
Anti-LGBT sentiment

A U.S. diplomat based in Kampala wrote on 24 December 2009 about the worsening human rights situation in Uganda, notably the build-up of religious-populist anti-LGBT sentiment by individuals both within and outside the Ugandan government.

The cable, titled Comment: Homophobic Demagogues (released on February 17, 2011), discussed the proceedings of an 18 November 2009 United Nations-funded Kampala consultative conference on human rights which involved members of the Uganda Human Rights Commission and human rights advocates. Before the debate, an anonymous text message to the diplomat from a Ugandan national described the fear among the underground LGBT community regarding the invitation to attend the debate. During the conference, Sexual Minorities Uganda advocacy officer David Kato spoke on the issue of LGBT rights and the anti-LGBT atmosphere in the country, but members of the UHRC "openly joked and snickered" during the speech, and a rumor circulated that David Bahati MP had ordered the Inspector General of Police to arrest, causing Kato and other attending members of SMUG to leave the conference immediately after he finished the speech. Bahati then made a "tirade against homosexuality" to the conference, resulting in massive applause and Ssempa pounding his fist on the table in agreement.

The cable also covered US efforts to curb the Uganda Anti-Homosexuality Bill, as well as the view of the diplomat regarding the backers of the bill; in particular, Bahati was described as a man whose "homophobia...is blinding and incurable".

A later cable, dated 16 February 2010, described a Ugandan LGBT community which had already been negatively affected by the sentiment. The cable iterated that "even if the draft bill is shelved in the weeks ahead, rampant homophobia in Uganda won't go away". The cable also covered a January 2010 closed-door conference between Maria Otero, the US under secretary for democracy and global affairs, and general human rights activists based in the country who expressed fear about government surveillance and wiretapping of communications.

War crimes

The revealed diplomatic cables suggest that the U.S. told Uganda to let it know when the army was going to commit war crimes using American intelligence, but did not try to dissuade it from doing so. The U.S. assists the Ugandan government in fighting against the rebel movement, the Lord's Resistance Army (LRA), providing information and $4.4 million (£2.8 million) worth of military hardware each year.

== Zimbabwe ==
Marange diamond fields

A 2008 diplomatic cable confirmed earlier allegations that high-ranking Zimbabwean government officials and well-connected elites are generating millions of dollars in personal income by hiring teams of diggers to hand-extract diamonds from the Chiadzwa mine in eastern Zimbabwe.

Proposed nonviolent coup

In 2007 a group of exiled businessmen proposed plans for a bloodless coup to remove Robert Mugabe, President of Zimbabwe. The idea was to get Mugabe to shift power to a "technocratic" prime minister and continue to be president with limited power until 2010.

Robert Mugabe

In 2000 UN Secretary General Kofi Annan allegedly offered Robert Mugabe a lucrative retirement package if he were to stand down as president.

== Presence of other countries in Africa ==
=== China ===
In a 2010 diplomatic cable, the U.S. Assistant Secretary for African Affairs downplays China as a military, security or intelligence threat, describing it instead as a 'very aggressive economic competitor with no morals'. The diplomatic cable also highlights how 'the Chinese are dealing with the Mugabe's and Bashir's of the world, which is a contrarian political model'.
