= Lemba, Kinshasa =

Lemba
- Commune
- Commune de Lemba
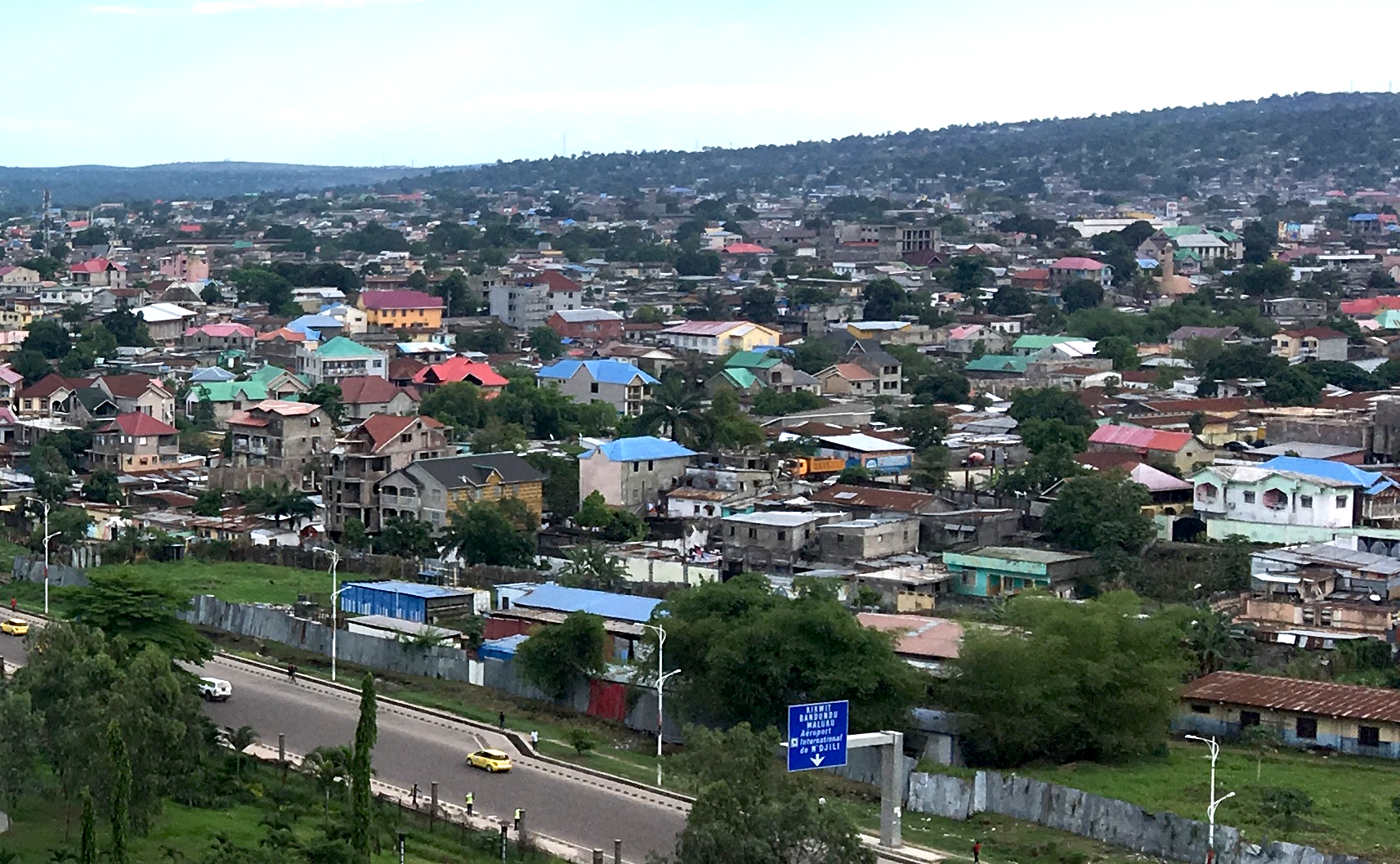
- Lemba seen from the Limete Tower
- Lemba on map of Kinshasa city-province
- Location in DR Congo
- Coordinates: 4°23′46″S 15°19′09″E
- Country: DR Congo
- City-Province: Kinshasa

Government
  - Burgomaster: Jean Serge Poba
  - PDs: Peter Kazadi Kankonde; Yvette Lubala Nazinda

Area
  - Total: 23.70 km^{2} (9.15 sq mi)

Population (2015 est.)
  - Total: 1,120,992
  - Density: 47,300/km^{2} (122,500/sq mi)
- Website: www.lemba.gouv.cd

Lemba is a commune in the Mont Amba District of Kinshasa. Covering approximately 23.70 square kilometers, it had an estimated population of 1,120,992 in 2015, making it the seventh-most populous commune. Lemba is bordered by several communes, with the Limete commune to the north, the Kalamu River forming a natural boundary with Ngaba to the northwest, and Makala to the southwest. The Kimwenza road marks its border with Mont-Ngafula, while the Matete River separates it from Matete to the northeast and Kisenso to the southeast.

Lemba gained prominence with the founding of Lovanium University (now the University of Kinshasa), the country's first university, in 1954. It also contained some of Kinshasa's earliest planned residential quartiers, including Righini, where the Tabernacle of the Disciples of William Marrion Branham is located. Other educational and research institutions include the Regional Center for Nuclear Studies, the private Université Panafricaine de Gouvernance et Innovations, and Notre-Dame de la Sagesse. Lemba also hosts the sports clubs BC Biso Na Biso and Athlétique Club Kuya Sport. The commune's economy is predominantly based on market gardening and social-commercial activities.

== Geography ==
=== Location ===
Lemba is geographically defined by a combination of natural and constructed boundaries. To the north, its border follows the intersection of the Matete River with Kikwit Avenue, extending to the interchange circle and continuing south and east along this axis to rejoin the Matete River. The eastern boundary follows the Matete River upstream to its source, connecting via a straight line to the southeastern corner of the University of Kinshasa's concession.

The southern and western borders extend from this point along the road surrounding the university concession, meeting a by-pass road that connects to the Yolo River. The western boundary traces the Yolo River to its intersection with the Kikwit River axis.

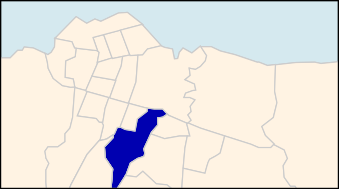
Lemba on map of city communes

=== Climate ===
Lemba shares Kinshasa's tropical climate, characterized by a hot and humid atmosphere. It experiences two distinct seasons: an eight-month rainy season and a four-month dry season.

== Government ==
Lemba's current borders were established by Ministerial Decree No. 69/0042 in January 1969 and further reinforced by Ordinance-Law No. 82/088 of 25 January 1982, which defined the commune as a decentralized administrative entity with legal personality, alongside the other communes of Kinshasa. It is governed by the Kinshasa city authorities and operates with a municipal council and an executive college. Leadership is provided by a government-appointed, unelected mayor (Burgomaster; French: Bourgmestre) and a deputy mayor, both appointed by the head of state. As of 2023 the burgomaster is Jean Serge Poba. The reform of having burgomasters elected by communal councils awaits the inaugural election of these councils.

=== Electoral district ===
With 206,900 on its voter rolls Lemba is an electoral district for both the election of an eleven-member communal council and that of two deputies of the Provincial Assembly of Kinshasa. Both elections are by open list. For the National Assembly Lemba is part of the Kinshasa III district (Mont Amba).

Nationwide communal council elections were scheduled for 22 September 2019 but did not take place. In December of that year President Tshisekedi declared that these elections would be held sometime in 2020.

The Provincial Assembly election was held as part of the general elections on 30 December 2018. Peter Kazadi Kankonde (UDPS/Tshisekedi) and Yvette Lubala Nazinda (AA/a) are the deputies representing Lemba in the new legislature.

=== Administrative divisions ===
In 2014 Lemba was divided into the following 15 quarters (French: quartiers):

- Camp Mobutu (now Kabila)
- Camp Osso (Bumba Moaso)
- Commercial
- Echangeur
- Ecole
- Foire
- Gombele
- Kemi
- Kimpwanza
- Livulu
- Mandrandele
- Masano
- Mbanza-Lemba
- Molo
- Salongo

However, Camp Kabila and Camp Bumba are respectively camps of the National Police and the Armed Forces.

== History ==
The name Lemba originates from the Humbu people, a Bantu-speaking ethnic group, and means "owners of the banks and lands to the south of the Pool Malebo". Before European contact, Lemba was already a vibrant area of settlement and trade within the Malebo Pool region. It served as a key marketplace where traders from the upper and lower Congo River regions gathered, notably near a baobab tree that once stood on the present-day grounds of the University of Kinshasa.

European documentation of Lemba began in the 17th century. The Franciscan missionary Girolamo Merolla da Sorrento, who arrived in the Congo in 1683, provided one of the earliest accounts. Operating under the Congregation for the Evangelization of Peoples, he attempted to evangelize the Kingdom of Kakongo while undertaking diplomatic missions. Notably, he supported João Manoel Grilho (João II Nzuzi a Ntamba), a ruler who had sought refuge in Lemba, and considered him the legitimate king of the Kongo Kingdom during Kongo Civil War. In the late 19th century, the Welsh-American explorer Henry Morton Stanley also described Lemba as a major commercial hub during his travels. During the colonial period, the territorial organization of Lemba was shaped by the royal decrees of 1 July 1897, which established administrative structures across the province of Léopoldville (modern-day Kinshasa).

The Ordinance-Law of 12 February 1913, introduced regulations requiring African residents in urban districts to form designated districts, marking a shift in Lemba's governance. Between 1950 and 1955, Lemba was classified as an annexed territory of Léopoldville, administered by a territorial administrator and a village chief, without autonomous status. On 14 October 1957, Decree No. 211/429 formalized the boundaries and names of Léopoldville's annexed communes.

In 1959, Lemba and Matete were officially established as communes. Under the Second Republic, Lemba transitioned to an urban area through Ordinance-Law No. 024 of 20 January 1968, gaining legal recognition as a commune. Its status was further solidified by Ordinance-Law No. 82/088 of 25 January 1982, which defined the commune as a decentralized administrative entity with legal personality, alongside the other communes of Kinshasa.

== See also ==
- List of burgomasters of Lemba, Kinshasa (in French)

== Notable people ==
- Beni Baningime, professional footballer
- Jean Goubald Kalala, guitarist and singer
- Rosny Kayiba, gospel singer-songwriter
