= Ministry of Public Health, Hygiene and Social Welfare =

Government ministry of the Democratic Republic of the Congo

The Ministry of Public Health (French: Ministère de la Santé Publique) is the health ministry of the Democratic Republic of the Congo. Samuel Roger Kamba Mulamba is the current minister since March 2023.

It has a public health system based loosely on the historical Belgian colonial public health system. The ministry is largely a policy and oversight organization, with operational functions embodied within a number of subordinate ministry organizations, including the Institute of Tropical Medicine, Institute of Biomedical Research (Institut National de Recherché Biomédicale) and the Kinshasa School of Public Health. The latter trains physicians in public health, staffs the public health infrastructure composed of Health Zones, including the Health Zone doctors who provide both public health services and partial staffing of district hospitals.

In November 2012, Dr. Félix Kabange Numbi was appointed Health Minister of the Democratic Republic of the Congo. In 2018, the position was held by Oly Ilunga Kalenga.

== See also ==
- William Close
- Institut National de la Santé Publique RDC (INSP;'the national institute of public health')
