= Webe Kadima =

Associate professor of chemistry

Webe Celine Kadima (born 1958) is currently a professor of Biochemistry in the Faculté of Médecine of the Université Notre Dame du Kasayi (UKA). She was previously an associate professor of chemistry at the State University of New York at Oswego.

== Early life ==
Kadima was born in Burundi and moved to the Democratic Republic of Congo when she was 4 years old. She grew up there, and studied at the School for Girls of the Janua Caeli Institute, in the city of Kananga, completing secondary school in Kinshasa (1975). After spending one year at the University of Kinshasa, in the Department of Chemistry, she moved to Montréal, Canada, where she graduated with a Bachelor of Science in Chemistry, and a Master of Science in Physical Chemistry at the University of Montreal. Her father was a diabetic and died from complications from diabetes while she was at the University of Montreal. She, then, moved to Edmonton, Canada, where she earned a PhD in bioanalytical chemistry from the University of Alberta. Her Ph.D. research work investigated the Chemistry of the toxicology of cadmium in red blood cells.

== Career ==
After graduating from the University of Alberta, Kadima held several different research and teaching positions including Research Biochemist at the University of California, Riverside and Assistant Professor of Chemistry at Florida International University and eventually became a professor at the State University of New York at Oswego. In 2004 she returned to the Democratic Republic of Congo (DRC) for a sabbatical to collaborate on research projects, focusing on plants traditionally used to treat diabetes in the Democratic Republic of the Congo. Since 2006, she has traveled to the country twice per year for this work. She created a nonprofit called the Bioactive Botanical Research Institute (BBRI), whose mission was to investigate medicinal plants used in the Congo and to develop pharmaceutical preparations that would be affordable, effective and safe.

She has also worked to create an ongoing exchange of African students with the State University of New York at Oswego. In 2010 it was announced that she had received a $200,000 National Science Foundation grant for the study of how to expand the number of women in science.

== Research and contributions ==
Kadima's research has focused on topics such as chemistry, protein biophysics, and diabetes. Her earlier work in bioanalytical chemistry, published in July 1983, presented the results of her Ph.D. research on a proton nuclear magnetic resonance study of the interaction of cadmium with human erythrocytes together with Rabenstein, Isab and Mohanakrishnan which used Proton nuclear magnetic resonance(NMR) to characterize cadmium speciation in human erythrocytes and hemolyzed red blood cells. She then performed studies of mixed ligand complexes with Glutathione and related ligands, as well as kinetics of palladium complexes in aqueous solution, for which she became first author.

She later conducted research on the physical biochemistry of insulin, using light scattering and 1H NMR to examine precrystallization aggregation, metal-free insulin association, and the role of pH, ionic strength, ligands, and metal ions in the T-to-R-state transition of the insulin hexamer. including metal-substituted and ligand-bound forms. More recently, her research in Kinshasa, DRC, focuses on metals and endocrine function, as well as diabetes screening and the study of medicinal plants used in the region to manage type 2 diabetes through her organization the Bioactive Botanical Research Institute (BBRI).

== Scientific publications ==
- Webe Kadima and Michael Hanson: A NMR Study of the T3R3 to R6 Allosteric Transition in the Iron-substituted Insulin Hexamer. Working Paper, Jan 2017.
- Webe Kadima, Angela Nugroho, Deborah Kerwood and Phil Borer: The T- to R-Allosteric Transition in the Cadmium-substituted Insulin Hexamer. Research, Jan 2016.
- Webe Kadima: Diabetes Screening in Kinshasa, Democratic Republic of Congo. Research, Jan 2016.
- Helle Birk Olsen, Melissa R Leuenberger-Fisher, Webe Kadima, [...], Michael F Dunn: Structural signatures of the complex formed between 3-nitro-4-hydroxybenzoate and the Zn(II)-substituted R 6 insulin hexamer. Oct 2003, Protein Science.
- Webe Kadima: Role of Metal Ions in the T- To R-Allosteric Transition in the Insulin Hexamer. Nov 1999, Biochemistry.
- W. Kadima, P. Raharivelomanana and B. Bechtel: The binding of cyclic adenosine 3′, 5′ monophosphate to the insulin hexamer. Jan 1997, Protein and Peptide Letters.
- W Kadima, L Ogendal, R Bauer, [...] and P Porting: The influence of ionic strength and pH on the aggregation properties of zinc-free insulin studied by static and dynamic laser light scattering. Biopolymers. Dec 1993, Biopolymers.
- W Kadima, M Roy, R. W. K. Lee, [...], M F Dunn: Studies of the association and conformational properties of metal-free insulin in alkaline sodium chloride solutions by one- and two-dimensional 1H NMR. Jun 1992, Journal of Biological Chemistry.
- Webe Kadima, Alexander McPherson, Michael F. Dunn and Frances Jurnak: Precrystallization aggregation of insulin by dynamic light scattering and comparison with canavalin. Mar 1991, Journal of Crystal Growth.
- Webe Kadima and Dallas L. Rabenstein: A quantitative study of the complexation of cadmium in hemolyzed human erythrocytes by 1H NMR spectroscopy. Nov 1990, Journal of Inorganic Biochemistry.
- Webe Kadima and Dallas L. Rabenstein: Nuclear magnetic resonance studies of the solution chemistry of metal complexes. 26. Mixed ligand complexes of cadmium, nitrilotriacetic acid, glutathione, and related ligands. J Inorg Biochem. May 1990, Journal of Inorganic Biochemistry.
- W Kadima, A McPherson, M F Dunn and F.A. Jurnak: Characterization of precrystallization aggregation of canavalin by dynamic light scattering. Feb 1990, Biophysical Journal.
- Karl F. Houben, Webe Kadima, Melinda Roy and Michael F. Dunn: L-Serine analogs form Schiff base and quinonoidal intermediates with Escherichia coli tryptophan synthase. May 1989, Biochemistry.
- Dallas L. Rabenstein, Anvarhusein A. Isab, Webe Kadima and P Mohanakrishnan: A proton nuclear magnetic resonance study of the interaction of cadmium with human erythrocytes. Aug 1983, Biochimica et Biophysica Acta.
- W. Kadima and M. Zador: Kinetics on interaction of Pd(en)Cl2 with inosine in chloride containing aqueous solutions. Jan 1983, Inorganica Chimica Acta.
- Webe Celine Kadima: NMR studies of the interaction of Cd(II) with ligands of biological interest and with red blood cells.
