= Notre-Dame de la Sagesse =

Coordinates: 4.4219°S 15.3093°E

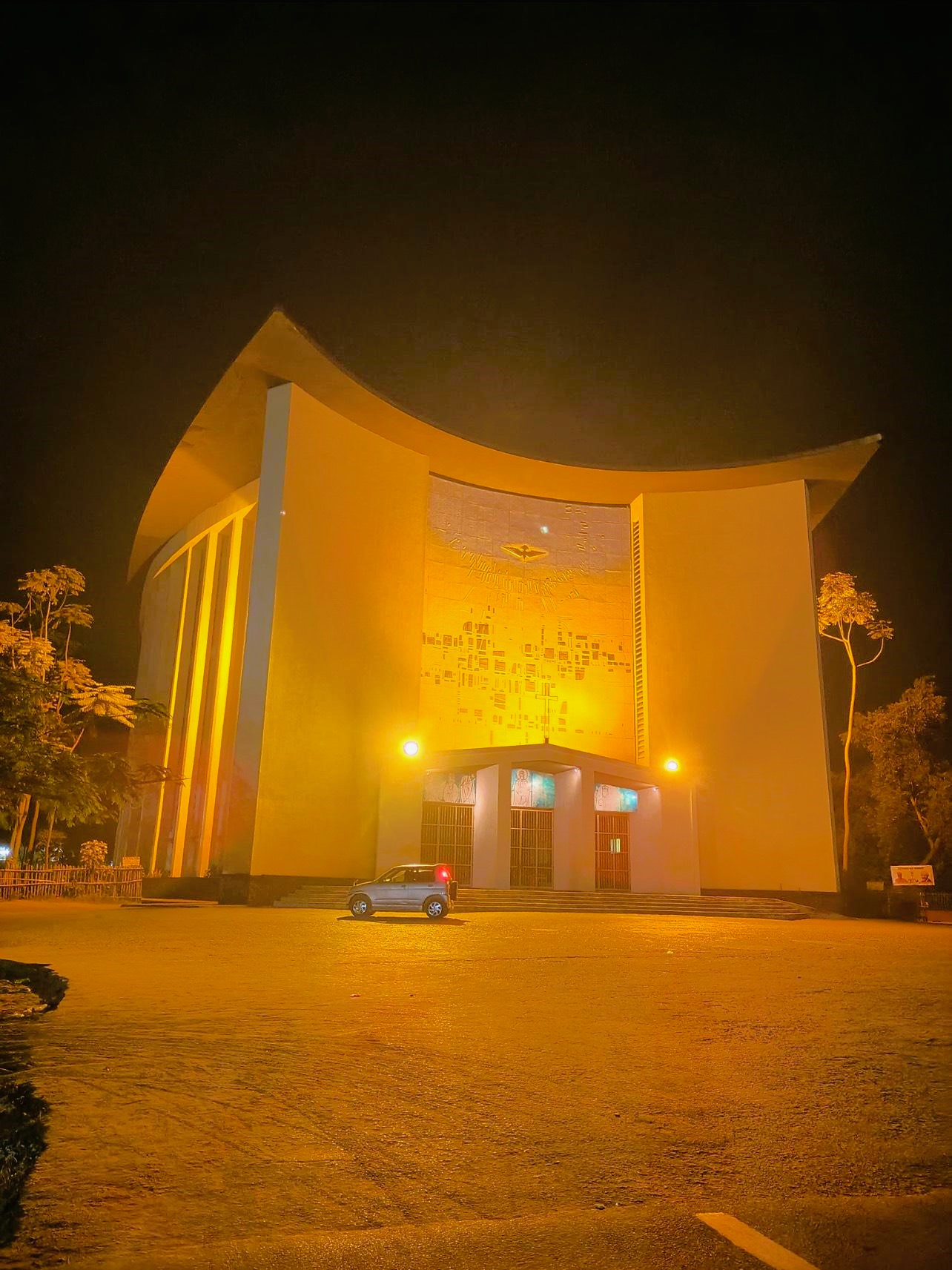
- Notre-Dame de la Sagesse at night

Religion
- Affiliation: Catholic Church
- Province: Archdiocese of Kinshasa
- Rite: Roman Rite
- Leadership: Abbot Georges Njila
- Status: Active

Location
- Location: Lemba, Kinshasa
- Country: Democratic Republic of the Congo
- Interactive map of Notre-Dame de la Sagesse

Architecture
- Type: Parish church
- Style: French Baroque and Neoclassical
- Established: 1957; 69 years ago

Website
- Notre-Dame de la Sagesse

Notre-Dame de la Sagesse (meaning "Our Lady of Wisdom"), contracted as NODASA, is a Roman Catholic parish church located on the University of Kinshasa's campus in the Lemba commune, Democratic Republic of the Congo. Operating under the auspices of the Doyenné Notre Dame de la Sagesse, it provides pastoral ministries to professors and students associated with the University of Kinshasa and Institut Supérieur des Techniques Médicales (ISTM-Kinshasa). It is the mother church for approximately 46,000 Catholics, including 34,000 students, 8,000 teachers, and their families. NODASA fosters symbiotic interfaith relations with adherents of Protestantism, Kimbanguism, Islam, and those embracing esoteric disciplines.

== History and iconographic elements ==
Established concurrently with the founding of Lovanium University (now the University of Kinshasa) in January 1954, the parish attained canonical status in 1957 with an ecclesiastical edifice boasting approximately 1,300 seats. Following the nationalization of the university in 1971, it continued its pastoral activities, evolving into a territorial parish with jurisdiction over the University Campus.

Architecturally, NODASA combines Western architectural styles with a fish-shaped design, emblematic to the "Ichthys" symbol of the first Christian tenets. The parish also features a center erected in 1965 and augmented in 1989, serving as a presbytery with clergy apartments, a technologically equipped informatics hub, and an expanse designated as the parish's horticultural garden.

== Organization ==
NODASA is subdivided into 16 organizational structures known as Basic Living Ecclesial Communities (Communautés Ecclésiales Vivantes de Base; CEVB), which support various commissions and movements.

=== Commissions ===
NODASA commissions include:

- Liturgy: Ensures the dignity of Eucharistic celebrations
- Catechesis and Christian Education: Provides doctrinal formation and proposes the Catholic faith to foster a deep understanding among parishioners.
- Parish and Development: Safeguards the parish heritage, facilitates growth through production units, and plays a pivotal role in the financial development of the parish.
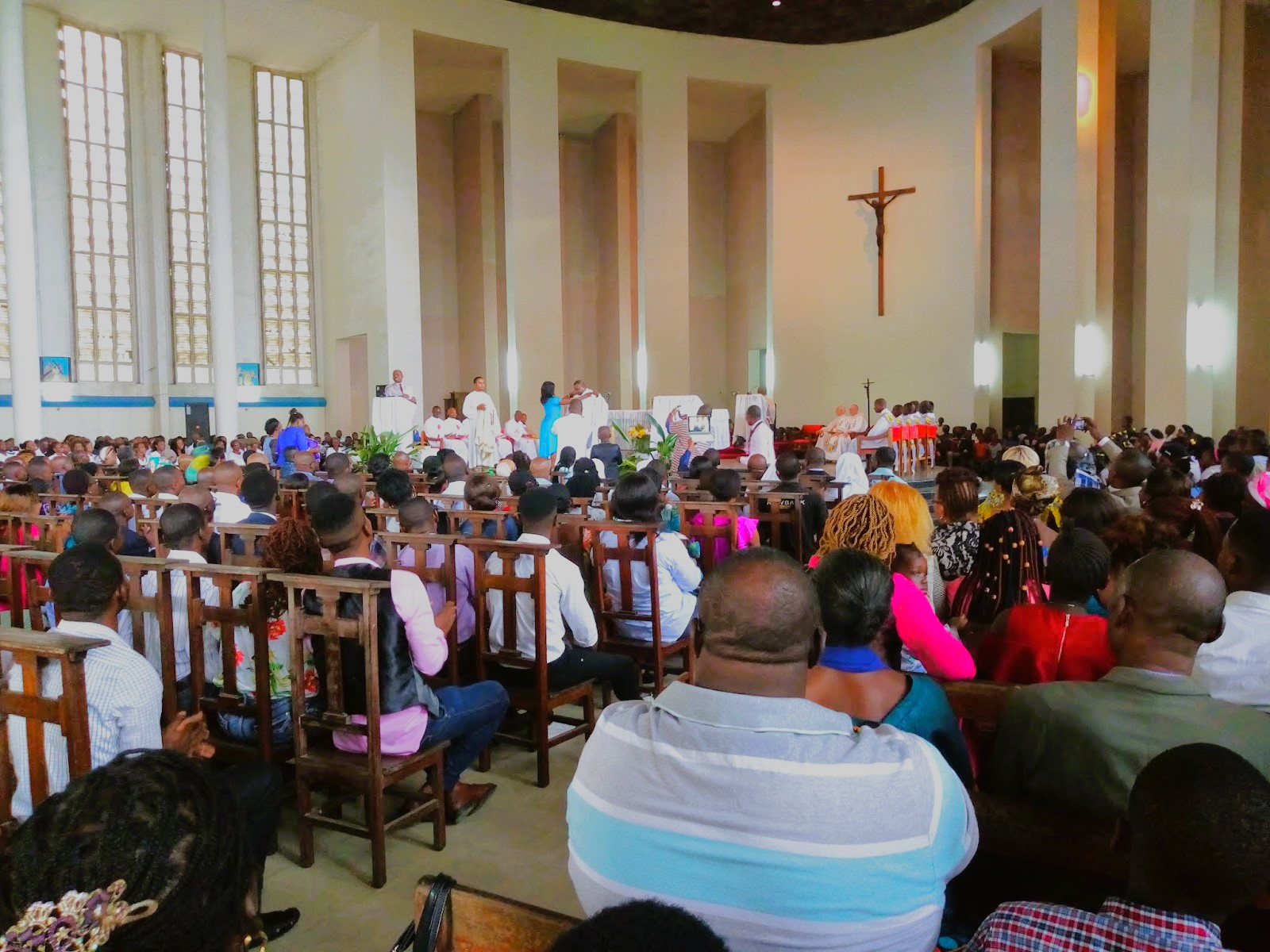
- The interior view of NODASA
  Justice and Peace: Raises awareness about fundamental rights.
- MABOTA (Family Pastoral): Offers support to engaged couples to provides Christian assistance to families, and mobilizes them for evangelization from a Catholic perspective.
- Vocations: Raises awareness of the importance of vocations and supports aspirants on their vocational journeys.
- Intellectuals and Continuing Education: Nurtures intellectual pursuits and provides avenues for ongoing education within the parish community.
- Social Community and OPM: Represents the social and evangelical dimensions of parish life.
- Caritas and Diaconia: Takes charge of charitable activities.
- Youth Commission: Assumes responsibility for the supervision of young people in the parish.

=== Movements ===
NODASA movements include:

- Catholic Moms
- Catholic Charismatic Renewal
- Sacred Heart of Jesus
- Legion of Mary
- Christian Family
- Service for Consecrated Life
- Community of Emmanuel
- New Roads
- CARM
- Saint EGIDIO
