= INSP =

INSP can refer to:

- A short form of Inspector
- INSP (TV network), a cable television network
- Institut national du service public, an educational institution in France
- International Network of Street Papers
- a ministry organization of the Ministry of Public Health (Democratic Republic of the Congo), the Institut National de la Santé Publique RDC
