= Kinshasa School of Public Health =

Medical school in Kinshasa, DR Congo

- Latin: École de Santé Publique de Kinshasa
- Type: Medical school
- Established: 28 August 1984; 41 years ago
- Parent institution: University of Kinshasa
- Academic affiliations: Tulane University; Catholic University of Louvain; Free University of Brussels
- Location: Lemba, Kinshasa, Democratic Republic of the Congo
- Campus: Urban
- Website: https://espkinshasa.net/

The Kinshasa School of Public Health (French: École de Santé Publique [ESP] de Kinshasa) is a postgraduate medical school training of the Faculty of Medicine of the University of Kinshasa. It specializes in public health education, research, and community service, and is located in the Lemba commune. Established on 28 August 1984, with support from the United States Agency for International Development (USAID) and a consortium of American universities led by Tulane University, the institution was founded to address the country's need for trained public health professionals.

== History ==
The establishment of the Kinshasa School of Public Health (ESP) was predicated on the imperative to develop a local cadre of highly trained public health specialists capable of managing health zones, services, and programs throughout the nation. After recognizing that traditional community health training required additional specialization, stakeholders prioritized the establishment of a specialized institution to bridge these gaps while adapting to local realities. Congolese public health professionals were previously trained abroad, but this approach proved insufficient and costly, with programs often misaligned with the country's specific needs.

In response, the Kinshasa School of Public Health was officially established on 28 August 1984, within the Faculty of Medicine at the University of Kinshasa (UNIKIN). The initiative was underpinned by the United States Agency for International Development (USAID) and a consortium of eminent American academic institutions, led by Tulane University. This endeavor came at a time when the Republic of Zaire (now the Democratic Republic of the Congo) had adopted a primary health care strategy in 1981. The ministerial decree that set up the school defined it as a post-university institution with importance at the national and continental levels. It also placed the school under UNIKIN's academic system and supervised by the Ministry of Higher and University Education (ESU).

The school began its training programs in the 1986–1987 academic year. Alongside its degree courses, it also carried out research, short-term training, and provided technical support, but the looting and political unrest in 1991 disrupted its work and led to the suspension of international partnerships, including support from USAID. However, the school continued to train professionals using remaining funds and assistance from the World Health Organization (WHO), which offered scholarships between 1995 and 1998. During this time, it also kept working with partners such as Tulane University and Belgian institutions like the Catholic University of Louvain (UCL) and the Free University of Brussels (VUB).

In the late 1990s, responding to an appeal from the Ministry of Public Health and a Dutch nongovernmental organization, the school inaugurated a specialized health school program to optimized resource management for population health. By the 2004-2005 academic year, the institution had produced thirty-three graduates out of thirty-five regularly enrolled students, including doctors, nurses, and administrators.

== Admission and course programs ==
=== Long term training ===
For long-term training, candidates must meet specific eligibility criteria depending on the level of study. Admission to the first level, which leads to the Special Diploma in Public Health (DSSP), similar to a Master of Public Health (MPH), applicants must have at least a bachelor's degree, along with three years of experience in public health. They also need three recommendation letters — from their employer, a Ministry of Public Health representative, and a member of ESP's extended technical committee. Applicants must also be under 45 years old, with preference often given to younger candidates, and they must have funding for their studies.

For the second level, which leads to the Advanced Diploma in Public Health (DES), candidates must already hold a DSSP or an equivalent qualification with strong results. The third level, a Doctorate in Public Health (DrSP), requires a DES with distinction and a clear plan to continue into teaching or research. Since 2004, the school has also introduced flexible programs, including a two-year DSSP and a 14-month DES focused on Health Economics.

=== Short term training ===
For short-term training, candidates must be working health professionals with relevant experience and must be recommended or sponsored by their employer. These programs are designed as refresher courses and focus on specific topics such as information technology (IT), food and hospital hygiene, management, AIDS, malaria, tuberculosis, and occupational health. Participants can earn certificates in public health by completing structured course blocks, including Public Health Methods (405 hours over four months), Management (300 hours over three months), and Community Health (390 hours over three months).

=== Training philosophy ===
The training focuses on quality and uses a hands-on approach rather than traditional classroom teaching. Students are placed at the center of their learning and are expected to take responsibility for their progress. They learn by solving real problems and organizing their own work, with teachers acting as guides and advisors instead of just lecturers. This approach requires discipline, as students must follow the program and take part in individual and group activities. It also helps them build skills in self-management and prepares them to keep learning even after they return to their professional roles.

== Organization ==
=== Governance ===
ESP operates as an autonomous unit within the Faculty of Medicine and follows a structure similar to the Cliniques Universitaires de Kinshasa and the Centre Neuro-Psycho Pathologique. It is managed by a committee and led by a director, who also serves as vice-dean of the Faculty of Medicine. The leadership team also includes a deputy director in charge of administrative matters, a secretary responsible for academic training, and another secretary who oversees research activities. Academic decisions are made at the department level, while daily administration is handled through three main areas: human resources, financial management, and general resource management.

=== Mission ===
The school's main goal is to support postgraduate training across different areas of public health, including medicine, dentistry, pharmacy, administration, nursing, economics, and veterinary science, among others. It aims to train skilled public health professionals who can improve people's health, support well-being, and contribute to social and economic development. The school also focuses on ongoing training, helping professionals at all levels stay prepared to deal with new and changing health challenges.

ESP carries out empirical research to better understand and respond to health issues affecting the Congolese population, and also administers disease surveillance mechanisms and evaluate health programs and initiatives. Following the African Health Development Charter of 1990, the school supports a universal health approach based on primary health care, as outlined in the 1992 National Sovereign Conference, which guides the development of the healthcare system and the training of health zone administrators.

=== Departments ===
The Kinshasa School of Public Health is organized into various specialized departments:

- Environmental Management
- Nutrition
- Environment, Hygiene, Sanitation, and Water
- Community Health
- Health System Policy and Administration
