= Jacqueline Penge Sanganyoi =

Congolese politician

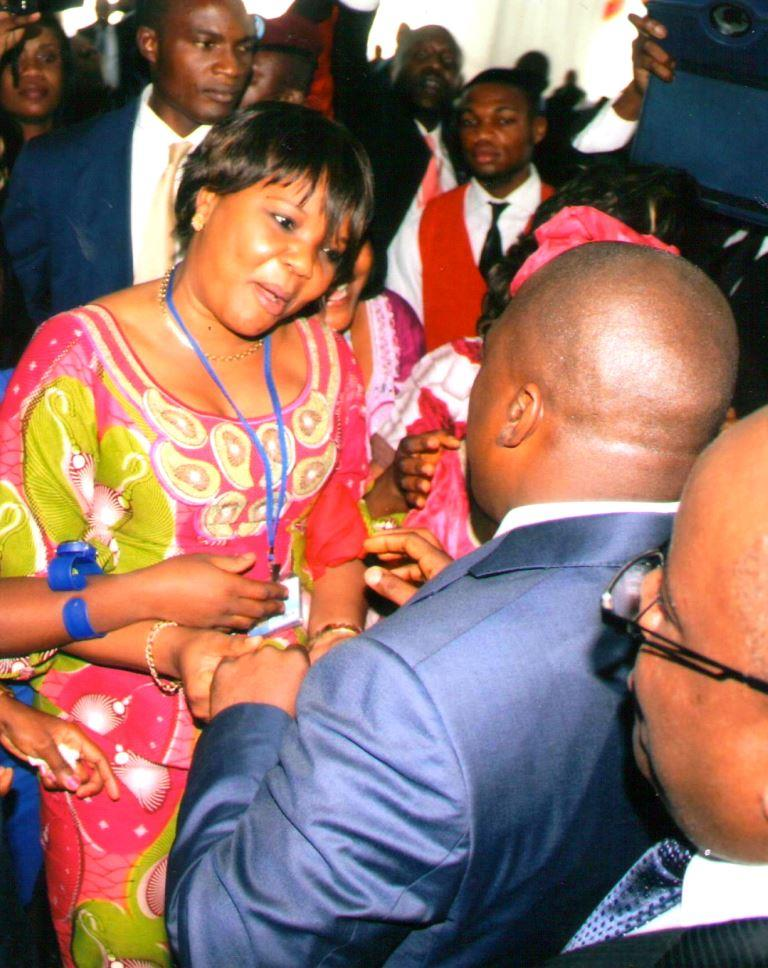
- Sanganyoi with Évariste Boshab.

Minister to the Prime Minister
- Incumbent
- Assumed office September 6, 2019
- President: Felix Tshisekedi
- Prime Minister: Sylvester Ilunga
- Preceded by: Tshibangu Kalala

Personal details
- Party: FCC
- Education: University of Kinshasa

Jacqueline Penge Sanganyoi is a Congolese politician from the Democratic Republic of the Congo.

She is the current Minister to the Prime Minister, Sylvestre Ilunga and is part of the FCC, the party Félix Tshisekedi is in. She was appointed on September 6, 2019.

== Biography ==
Jacqueline's political party is the Common Front for Congo. She was formerly an Expert Ministry of the Portfolio, a Financial Director, Administrator chief financial officer, a Deputy Permanent Secretary, the Head of Logistics Department, and a Head of the Internal Audit Department of the Congolese Control Office.

She also has other jobs. She works as an External Administrator at the Office des Voierie et Drainage (OVD), Auditor at the Kinshasa General Hospital (a.k.a. Mama Yemo Hospital), Sub-Manager of Credits at the Ministry of Relations between Political Parties and the Government (MIREPA), Vice President of the Platform of the Basic Communities of the Grand Kasai area, Representative of the CENI on behalf of the PPRD, focal point at the National Democratic Institute (NDI) on behalf of the PPRD, Delegate of the PPRD to the collective of women of the presidential majority (COFEMAP), She is current President of the Association of Women and Young Builders of Congo (ASBL AFJBAC), founding member and member of the committee of elders of the Sankuru Women's Collective for Peace and Development, Coordinator and Representative from the DRC to the International Millennium Women's Organization “OIFM” / USA, member of the Forum of Economists of Congo “FORECO”, and a member of the Association Africa Femmes Performantes.

== See also ==
- Politics of the Democratic Republic of the Congo
- Government of the Democratic Republic of the Congo
