= Regional Center for Nuclear Studies =

Nuclear research reactor in Kinshasa, DR Congo

The Regional Center for Nuclear Studies in Kinshasa, Democratic Republic of the Congo, (CREN-K, French: Centre Régional d'Études Nucléaires de Kinshasa), prior to 1970 known as the Trico Center (French: Centre Trico), houses the TRICO I and TRICO II nuclear research reactors. TRICO I was the first nuclear reactor on the African continent.

== History ==
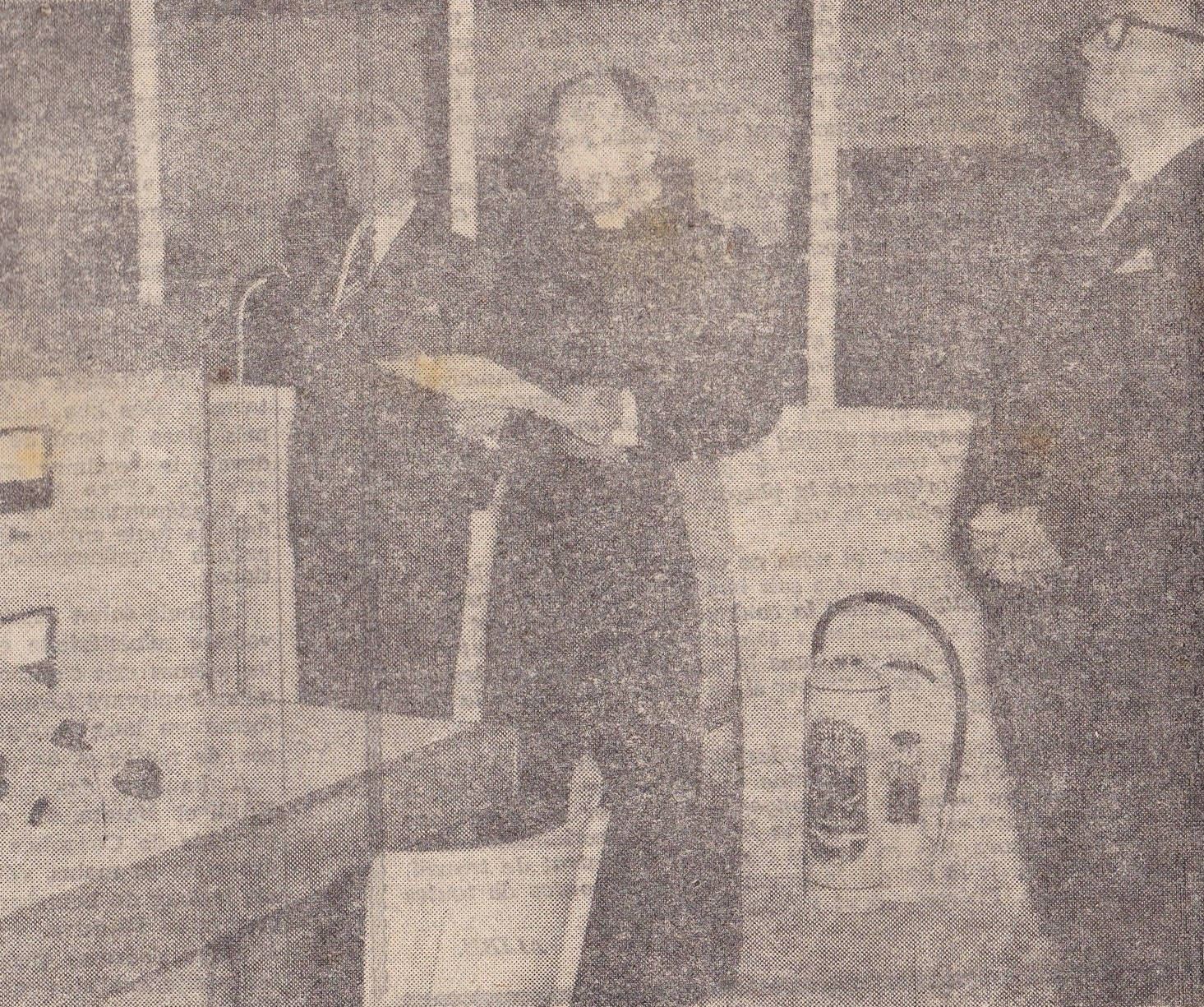
Ceremony commemorating the activation of the first Congolese nuclear reactor with Lovanium University rector Luc Gillon, Governor-General of the Congo Hendrik Cornelis, and Minister of Colonies Maurice van Hemelrijck

In 1956, prior to the independence of the Democratic Republic of the Congo from Belgium, Luc Gillon, rector of Lovanium University launched the idea of establishing a research reactor at the university. In 1958, the government of Belgian Congo, with the approval of the Belgian minister of Congo and Ruanda-Urundi bought a TRIGA MARK I reactor from General Atomics. The Trico Center was constructed to house the reactor on land belonging to the science and medical faculties of the Lovanium University (later University of Kinshasa). It became operational in May 1959 and was incorporated into the studies of Congolese and other African students.

In 1960 the Congo became independent, but the country quickly fell into a crisis. The United States feared that the fissile material in the reactor could be stolen or the reactor would otherwise fall into the hands of an unfavorable government. In August the United States Atomic Energy Commission instructed CIA officer Larry Devlin to steal the reactor's fuel rods, rendering TRICO inoperable, and advise Gillon of this. Devlin consulted Gillon, who denounced the proposal as unsafe and impossible to do without drawing attention. Devlin reported this to the United States government, which dropped the matter.

Post independence, at the 1967 Organisation of African Unity summit in Kinshasa African heads of state decided to transform Trico Center into a regional study center. Despite OAU recommendations, the center has only been operated by Congolese. From 1970 onwards it is known as CREN-K, Regional Center for Nuclear studies (French: Centre Régional d'Études Nucléaires de Kinshasa). CREN-K purchased a new reactor, TRICO II, with a larger capacity.

In 1968 the Democratic Republic of the Congo and Belgium signed general agreements on continued technological and scientific cooperation. Five years later in 1973 a specific agreement on cooperation of peaceful nuclear research was signed between Belgium and then Zaire. The agreements after several extensions lasted until 1987. In practise it meant that SCK•CEN assisted CREN-K in the construction and yearly maintenance of TRICO II. The Institute for Radioactive Elements (IRE) in Fleurus Belgium assisted CREN-K in the production of medical isotopes. In return CREN-K agreed to also run research programs proposed by mutually recognized Belgian institutions.

The TRICO II reactor is subject to yearly IAEA inspections. In 1988 IAEA started a project to deliver replacement parts and new nuclear fuel. Because the American company General Dynamics Corporation, which had been contracted to deliver these parts, was unable to fulfil its obligations due to an embargo imposed on the Mobutu government. In exchange for spare parts and training seminars from the IAEA the Democratic Republic of the Congo participates in RAF and AFRA projects.

The government of the Democratic Republic of the Congo stopped adequately funding the project in the late 1980s. In 1998 it was reported that despite the lack of funds dedicated personnel kept the reactor in good shape. By this time the IAEA cooperation still had trouble locating replacement parts. Because spent fuel was not being replaced the reactor was only capable of operating at reduced capacity.

In 2004 the reactor was shut down for a scheduled stop and has been in a state of extended shutdown since.

Since 2010 there have been renewed campaigns to gather more support among the public opinion for CREN-K and utilizing the national resource that is uranium.

== Management ==
The Commissariat Général à l’Energie Atomique (CGEA) is responsible for nuclear energy, CREN-K and its reactors. It was previously known as the Commissariat des Sciences Nucléaires. It is a state-owned company under the supervision of the scientific research department of MESU, the Ministry of Higher Education (French: Ministère de L'Énseignement Superieur et Universitaire). As foreseen by law CGEA's articles of association describe three structures. Namely a Board of directors, a management committee, and a committee of auditors. However currently only the management committee exists and it is identical to the management committee of CREN-K. The committee consists out of a Commissioner General, director of science, CFO and a staff representative.

In 2010, CGEA/CREN-K employed 175 people. In June 2011 the Congolese government appointed Lukanda Mwamba Vincent as Commissioner General of CGEA.

== Reactors ==
"TRICO" is a portmanteau of the names TRIGA − the type of reactor − and Congo.

=== TRICO I ===
A 50 kW TRIGA MARK I reactor. Initial criticality June 6, 1959. The reactor was shut down June 29, 1970. It has been dismantled but not fully decommissioned. The reactor was used for training, fundamental research and for the production of agricultural and medical isotopes.

=== TRICO II ===
A 1 MW TRIGA MARK II reactor. Initial criticality March 24, 1972. The reactor has been in extended shutdown since 2004. The reactor was used for training, fundamental research, isotope production and material characterization. TRICO II uses uranium fuel enriched to 20%. CGEA intends to restart the reactor in the future. However to do this replacement parts are needed among which a $3 million digital control bay.

== Security and safety ==
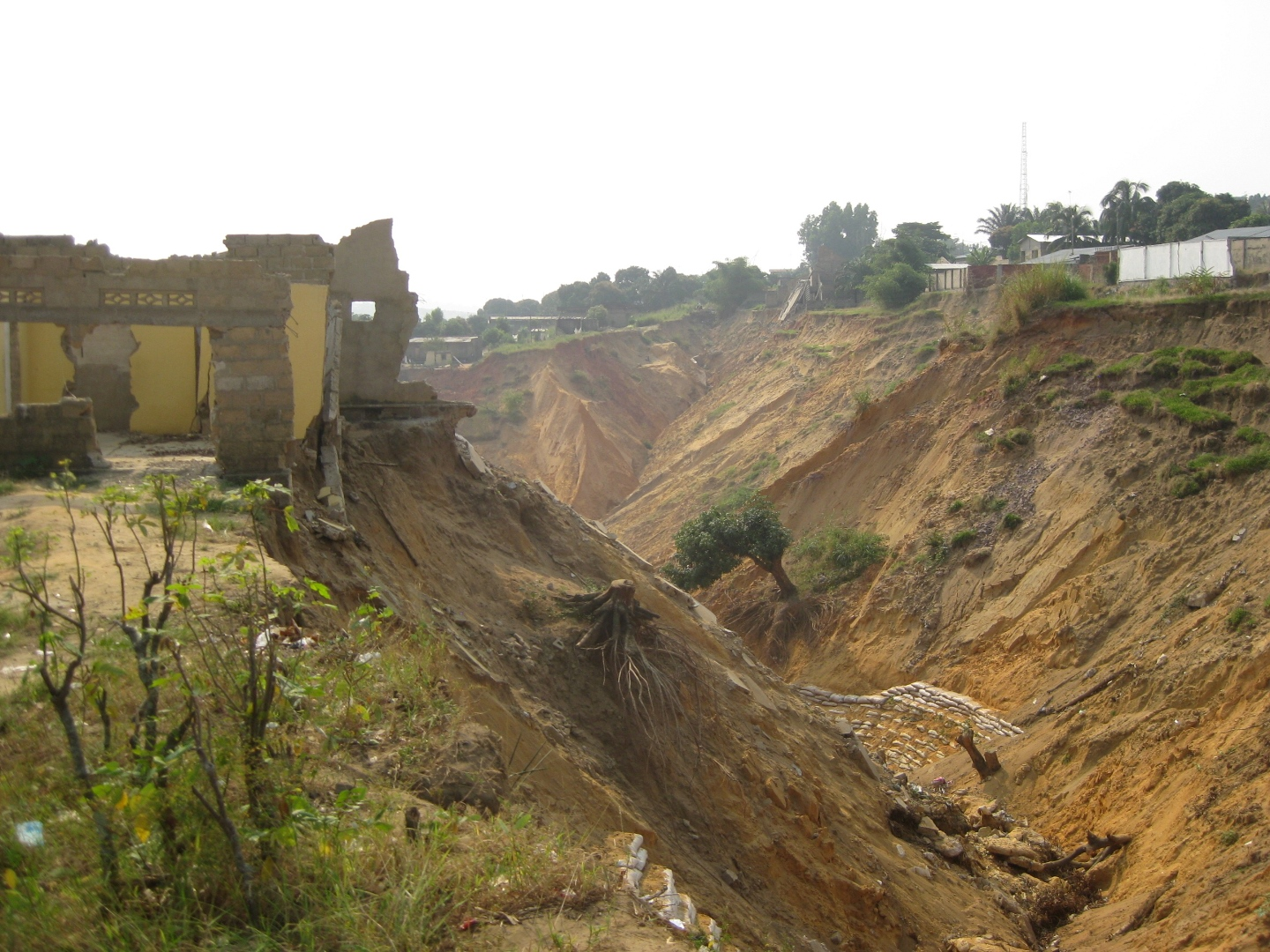
Erosion in the city Mama Mobutu, Mont Ngafula, near the University

International observers have long been concerned about the safety and security of the two nuclear reactors and the enriched uranium they contain.

The administration was astonished to be contacted in the early 1990s by the Italian police who informed them that a fuel rod that had been missing for two decades had been found in the hands of the Sicilian Mafia.

In 1998, a wall in the Regional Center for Nuclear Studies collapsed when torrential rains undermined the building's foundation. International Atomic Energy Agency officials have voiced concerns that the ongoing issue with erosion could lead to an accident that might contaminate the city of Kinshasa's water supply. Further concerns about the site were raised when, in 1999, an object that might have been a missile, struck the building and caused light damage.

The program has also had an ongoing issue with the disappearance of nuclear material that could be used by terrorists or rogue states. Several rods of highly enriched uranium (HEU) have disappeared from the reactors since the late 1970s. In 1998, a sting operation led by the Italian police seized a rod of HEU that weighed 190 grams. It was built by General Atomics in the early 1970s and shipped to Zaire for use in the TRICO II reactor. The rod was in the possession of an Italian mafia group that was trying to sell it for $12.8 million, possibly to a Middle Eastern country.

In 2007, the research center's director Fortunat Lumu and an aide were arrested and questioned about the disappearance of a large quantity of nuclear material, which local media reported was as much as 100 bars of uranium.

In 2010, leaked diplomatic cables reported on the troublesome security and safety situation, including manioc farming adjacent to a building storing nuclear waste.

In 2012, Vincent Lukanda (CGEA Commissar-General) declared that CREN-K was no longer threatened by erosion, and that the Congolese government was committed to protecting and modernizing the nuclear site, citing investments into a new perimeter fence.

In 2018, an IAEA expert team concluded that organisational and technical improvements were needed for the safety of the shutdown reactor "particularly considering the country's decision to bring the reactor back into operation".

== See also ==
- University of Kinshasa
- List of nuclear reactors

== Works cited ==
- Williams, Susan (2021). White Malice : The CIA and the Covert Recolonization of Africa. New York: PublicAffairs. ISBN 978-1-5417-6829-1.
