= Félix Kabange Numbi =

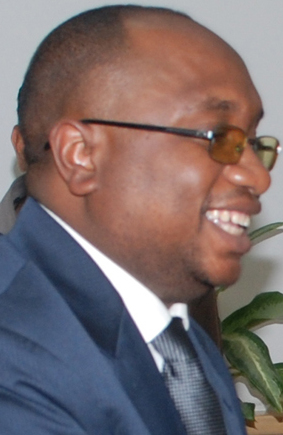
- Numbi in 2013

Minister of Regional Planning and Urban Development
- In office May 19, 2017 – January 30, 2019
- Preceded by: Position established

Minister of Land Affairs
- In office December 19, 2016 – May 9, 2017
- Preceded by: Gustave Boloko Nkeli
- Succeeded by: Lumeya Dhu-Maleghi

Minister of Public Health
- In office April 28, 2012 – December 19, 2016
- Preceded by: Victor Makwenge Kaput
- Succeeded by: Oly Ilunga Kalenga

Personal details
- Born: Félix Kabange Numbi Mukwampa; November 7, 1973 (age 52) Lubumbashi, Zaire (now Democratic Republic of the Congo
- Party: Awakening of Consciousness for Work
- Education: University of Lubumbashi
- Occupation: Doctor

Félix Kabange Numbi Mukwampa is a Congolese politician and doctor who served as Minister of Regional Planning and Urban Development from 2017 to 2019, Minister of Land Affairs from 2016 to 2017, and Minister of Public Health from 2012 to 2016.

== Early life ==
Numbi was born on November 7, 1973 in Lubumbashi, Zaire (now Democratic Republic of the Congo). He attended the University of Lubumbashi where he became a doctor of medicine.

From 2002 to 2004, Numbi chaired the Association of Community and Associated Radio Stations of the Congo. In 2019, he founded the Joseph Kabila Generation Rally (RGJK), with the aim of rehabilitating the image of Joseph Kabila among the Congolese public.

== Political career ==
Numbi's party is the Awakening of Consciousness for Work.

In 2010, Numbi joined the Katanga provincial government as Minister of Environment, Tourism, Sports, and Recreation. In April 2012, he was appointed Minister of Public Health in the First Matata government. One of Numbi's first acts as minister was fighting the ebola outbreak declared in the northeastern part of the country in August 2012. He also founded the creation of a national order of nurses and a national order of dental surgeons. He faced pushback from patients who had treatment abroad over slow processing.

In 2016, Numbi launched a national polio vaccination campaign. Over 18 million children between the ages of 0 and 60 months were vaccinated. He also signed an agreement i 2016 with Belgian pharmaceutical company ZenTech to detect the risks of sickle cell disease in Congolese newbornns. In his speech at the United Nations in 2016, he called on countries to help find a solution to HIV/AIDS to create an AIDS-free generation. He had previously given an anti-AIDS speech in Kinshasa at a UN event in 2012.

In 2016, with the appointment of Samy Badibanga as prime minister, Numbi was appointed Minister of Land Affairs. Upon taking office, he pledged to reduce land disputes. Numbi focused on digitizing the ministry, and worked to let women have a greater role in the ministry.

From May 2017 to January 2019, he served as Minister of Urban Renewal and Territorial Development in the Bruno Tshibala government.

=== Deputy ===
In 2019, Numbi was elected as a national deputy for Malemba-Nkulu Territory in Haut-Lomami District. He served as a deputy until 2023.
