= Provincial Assembly of Kinshasa =

Legislative body of the City-province of Kinshasa

Type
- Type: Unicameral house

Leadership
- President: Levi Mbuta Sangupamba since 20 April 2024
- Seats: 48 (44 elected, 4 co-opted)

Elections
- Voting system: Coexistence: Open list proportional representation with the largest remainder method in multi-member constituencies and first-past-the-post voting in single-member constituencies
- Last election: 20 December 2023
- Next election: December 2028

Meeting place
- Kinshasa

The Provincial Assembly of Kinshasa (French, l’Assemblée provinciale de Kinshasa) is the legislative body of the city-province of Kinshasa. Levi Mbuta Sangupamba is the speaker of the provincial assembly.

== Members ==
The Assembly is made up of 48 members, 44 elected in the 24 electoral districts which are the communes of Kinshasa, and four co-opted traditional leaders selected by their peers.

== Bibliography ==
- Elua Imanda, Willy-Jacques (2010). Assemblée nationale et assemblée provinciale en RDC sous la constitution du 18 février 2006. Université de Kinshasa. Licence.
