= University of Kinshasa =

Public university in Democratic Republic of the Congo

- Université de Kinshasa
- Motto: Scientia Splendet et Conscientia; Latin
- Motto in English: "Science shines and so does conscience"
- Type: Public
- Established: 1954; 72 years ago
- Rector: Jean-Marie Kayembe Ntumba (since 2021)
- Academic Secretary General: Eustache Banza Nsomwe-A-Nfunkwa
- Faculty: 1,929
- Students: 29,554
- Location: Lemba, Kinshasa, Democratic Republic of the Congo; 4°25′10″S 15°18′35″E
- Colours: Red, yellow and blue
- Website: www.unikin.ac.cd

The University of Kinshasa (French: Université de Kinshasa), colloquially known by its acronym UNIKIN, is a public university located in Kinshasa's Lemba commune within the western region of the Democratic Republic of the Congo. It is the country's premier university. The university was founded in 1954 as Lovanium University during Belgian colonial rule, making it the oldest university in the country and one of its principal institutions of higher education.

The university traces its origins to educational and medical initiatives launched by the Catholic University of Louvain in the Belgian Congo in the 1920s. These developed into the Congolese University Center of Lovanium in 1947 and subsequently Lovanium University, which began operating at its Mount Amba campus in 1954. Lovanium became an important center of higher education and research in Central Africa. On 20 July 1971, it was renamed the University of Kinshasa (UNIKIN) and was incorporated into the National University of Zaire (UNAZA) on 6 August. In 1981, UNAZA was decentralized, and its Kinshasa campus was re-established as the University of Kinshasa.

The university had an enrollment of 29,554 and a faculty and research staff of 1,929 in the 2018–19 academic year, and currently has twelve academic divisions. The Notre-Dame de la Sagesse is strategically located on the campus and provides pastoral ministries to professors and students.

== Campus ==
The university is located about 25 kilometres (16 mi) south of central Kinshasa, in the suburb of Lemba.

Many of the campus facilities have deteriorated and are in poor condition, or lack proper instructional tools - in 2003, the science library had as few as 300 titles in its collection. Since 2001, the university has hosted Cisco Academy, a joint project sponsored by the American software company Cisco and the United Nations Development Programme. The academy focuses on providing recent technology, training students to install and operate computer networks and all coursework is online.

== History ==
=== 1924–1959: Origins and Lovanium University ===
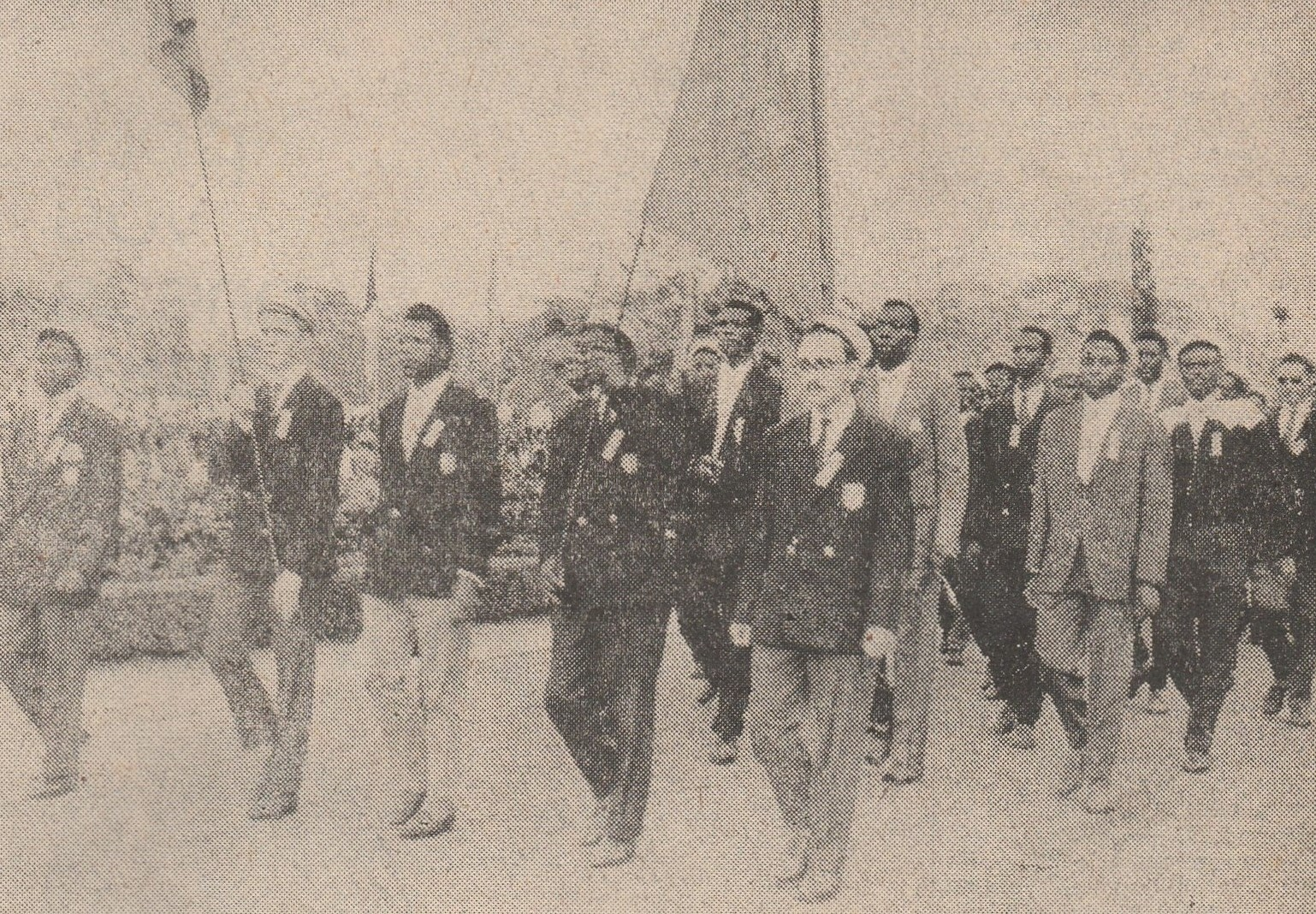
Lovanium University students marching during the Independence Day celebration on 30 June 1960

The origins of the University of Kinshasa traced back to 1924 when the Catholic University of Louvain established a medical association to address health and education in the Belgian Congo. At that time, the colony grappled with a critical shortage of medical professionals. The proposal gained traction, particularly through the advocacy of physiologist Fernand Malengreau and histologist Jules Havet, each of whom contributed distinctively to its realization. Malengreau championed the establishment of an independent association, while Havet recommended the formation of a university foundation for the overseas initiative. Malengreau contended that combating the pervasive epidemic of sleeping sickness required an extensive and well-structured healthcare network across the Belgian Congo, with the critical solution being the training of a significant cohort of skilled Congolese personnel. This vision could not be entrusted solely to public authorities, who had previously established six underperforming nursing schools due to the reluctance of Catholic missions to collaborate with state-run institutions. This initiative culminated in the establishment of the Fondation Médicale de l'Université de Louvain au Congo (FOMULAC) on 15 January 1926 in Kisantu, Bas-Congo (now Kongo Central), through the collective efforts of a group of French-speaking professors, inspired by the suggestion of rector Paulin Ladeuze. The association's statutes were officially published in the Moniteur belge on 13 February of that year. While Léon Dupriez, a law professor and vice-president of the Colonial Council, was appointed president for reasons of prestige, Malengreau became the intellectual architect of the foundation, remaining actively involved for three decades, even after his emeritus status. As secretary-general, he facilitated communication among the university, missionary authorities, and colonial administration. The medical infrastructure construction began in April 1926. Spanning a 10-hectare site, the facility consisted of ten pavilions, with separate sections for black African and white patients, a dispensary, and specialized departments for surgery, obstetrics, internal medicine, and general health. The complex also included a medical staff training school, research laboratories, a chapel, and residential accommodations for the Sisters of Charity of Namur, who assisted in the hospital's operations. A 'maternity village' was gradually constructed and it surrounded the medical complex with traditional dwellings.

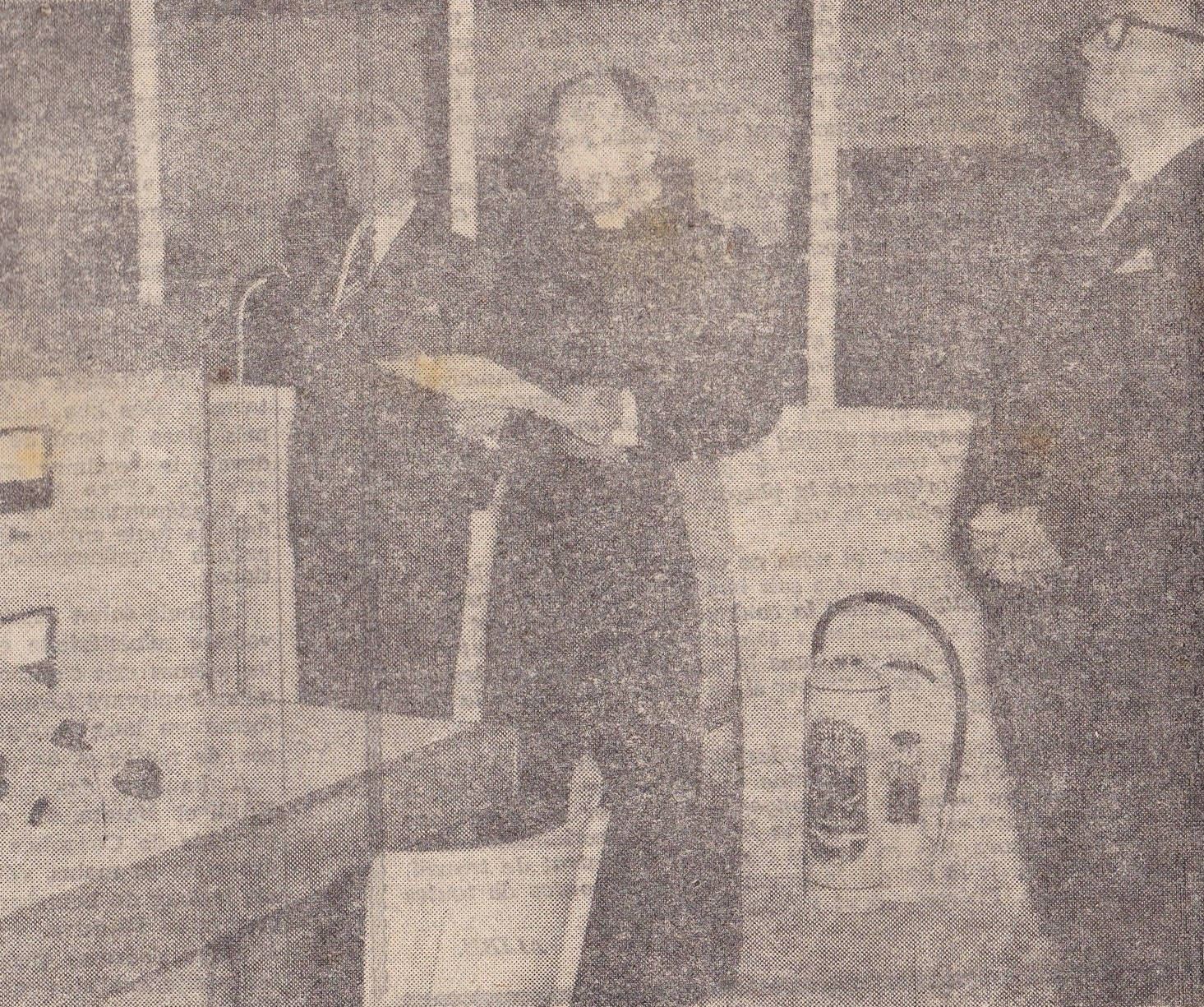
Ceremony commemorating the activation of the first Congolese nuclear reactor with Lovanium University rector Luc Gillon, Governor-General of the Congo Hendrik Cornelis, and Minister of Colonies Maurice van Hemelrijck

In 1932, the Catholic University of Louvain established an agronomy section at Kisantu. Sections in administrative and commercial sciences and medical assistance followed in 1936 and 1937, respectively. In 1947, these sections were consolidated into the Congolese University Center of Lovanium. The center subsequently moved from Kisantu to Kimwenza and became Lovanium University in 1952. In 1954, the university began operating at its 400-hectare Mount Amba campus. Congolese demographer Bernard Mumpasi Lututala noted that Lovanium preceded the establishment of the University of Dakar by two years, describing it as a "pioneer of Francophone higher education in Africa". Lovanium offers programs in natural sciences, social and administrative sciences, pedagogical sciences, and agricultural sciences. It received funding from the colonial government, the Ford Foundation, the Rockefeller Foundation, and the United States Agency for International Development.

In 1957, Lovanium established university clinics and introduced its first doctoral program in medicine. That year, the university also installed a TRIGA nuclear reactor, supporting research on biological specimens, including animals, plants, seeds, and chemical systems. Lovanium subsequently developed into a prominent center of higher education and research in Central Africa. Its students and visitors included several individuals who later became prominent in African and international politics, among them Mengistu Haile Mariam, Nzo Ekangaki, and Mahmoud Riad, while scholars associated with the university included Igor Prigogine and Cheikh Anta Diop.

=== 1960–1981: Student activism, National University of Zaire and 1981 reform ===
During the first five years of independence, student activism focused on the political turmoil of the First Republic, particularly the assassination of Patrice Lumumba in 1961, as well as issues of university governance. Following Lumumba's assassination, Congolese students established the General Union of Congolese Students (Union générale des étudiants du Congo; UGEC) to promote national consciousness and civic responsibility. At Lovanium, students were represented by the General Association of Lovanium Students (Association générale des étudiants de Lovanium; AGEL). In 1964, students demonstrated for the decolonization of the university, the Africanization of its leadership and staff, curriculum reform, and student representation in university governance. They argued that the university should train professionals and leaders capable of addressing Congolese and African challenges, and objected to its entirely Belgian Board of Directors and the location of its headquarters in Leuven.

Student opposition to Mobutu Sese Seko's regime emerged soon after he came to power, with one of the most significant demonstrations occurring on 4 June 1969. Students protested poor living conditions, the increasingly authoritarian direction of Mobutu's government, and what they viewed as its subordination to foreign economic and financial interests. A peaceful march proceeded from several gathering points. The army suppressed the demonstration by opening fire on protesters, killing dozens of students. In the following days, authorities carried out mass arrests, closed several higher education institutions, and banned student associations. On 4 June 1971, students demonstrated to commemorate the 1969 protests, symbolically burying a coffin in front of the university's administrative building. Accounts differ over its meaning, with some associated the coffin with students killed in 1969, while others claimed it represented the remains of Mobutu's late mother. The demonstration was followed by another government crackdown.

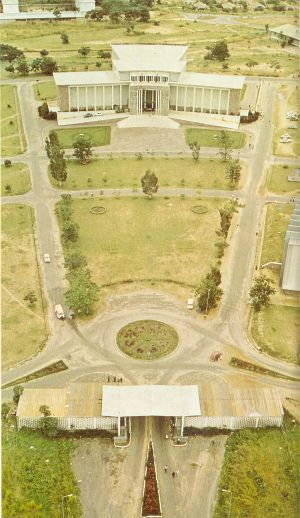
Nationalized in 1971, Lovanium University was integrated into the National University of Zaire (UNAZA) as one of its campuses. Circa 1974.

On 20 July 1971, Lovanium University was renamed the University of Kinshasa (UNIKIN). On 6 August 1971, Mobutu's government merged UNIKIN, the Protestant University in the Congo, and the University of Lubumbashi into the National University of Zaire (Université Nationale du Zaïre; UNAZA) as part of a broader reorganization of higher education. The government presented the reform as a means of addressing administrative inefficiencies and aligning academic programs with national development goals, while the centralized system increased state control over universities and reduced their institutional autonomy. Academic programs were reorganized into a three-tier structure consisting of a three-year undergraduate cycle, a two-year second cycle, and doctoral studies. Lovanium's ties with the Catholic University of Leuven were also severed, while funding declined. Initially designed to accommodate about 5,000 students, the campus became increasingly overcrowded as enrollment grew.

UNAZA was administered through a single rectorate, with faculty and staff placed on a state payroll. Although the system was intended to promote national integration and coordinate academic research, Congolese researcher Théodore Bahimba Nyembo argues that its centralized structure increasingly subordinated higher education to the political objectives of Mobutu's government. The system also faced chronic underfunding, exacerbated by corruption. By 1977, UNAZA faced deteriorating infrastructure, inadequate research facilities, and declining academic standards. Faculty protested low salaries, while students faced overcrowded classrooms and limited resources. Expansion of the higher education system also failed to keep pace with population and enrollment growth.

On 22 March 1980, students detained the national official responsible for student affairs after he arrived on campus to announce the dissolution of their Provisional Student Committee. The committee had replaced a previous student body accused of financial misconduct. Students launched a strike and refused to resume classes until the committee was reinstated and demands concerning their living conditions were addressed. Two days later, they seized the official vehicle of the president of the Legislative Council, returning it several days later after receiving their student allowances.

The 1981 reform, enacted through State Decisions No. 08/CC/81 and No. 09/CC/81, reorganized Zaire's education system at the primary, secondary, and higher education levels. It sought to align education more closely with national development by training skilled professionals. Universities were tasked with providing advanced technical training while fostering nationalism and civic responsibility. The reform also directed higher pedagogical institutes (Instituts Supérieurs Pédagogiques) to train teachers equipped with pedagogical skills and expected to fulfill moral and political responsibilities prescribed by the state. The reform decentralized UNAZA, restoring the universities of Kinshasa, Kisangani, and Lubumbashi as separate institutions. According to Nyembo, however, the reform retained the centralized and politically controlled framework established in 1971. It also failed to resolve several problems inherited from that system, including inadequate research funding and the poor alignment of university curricula with labor-market needs.

=== 1981–present: Decline in funding, unrest, and rehabilitation ===
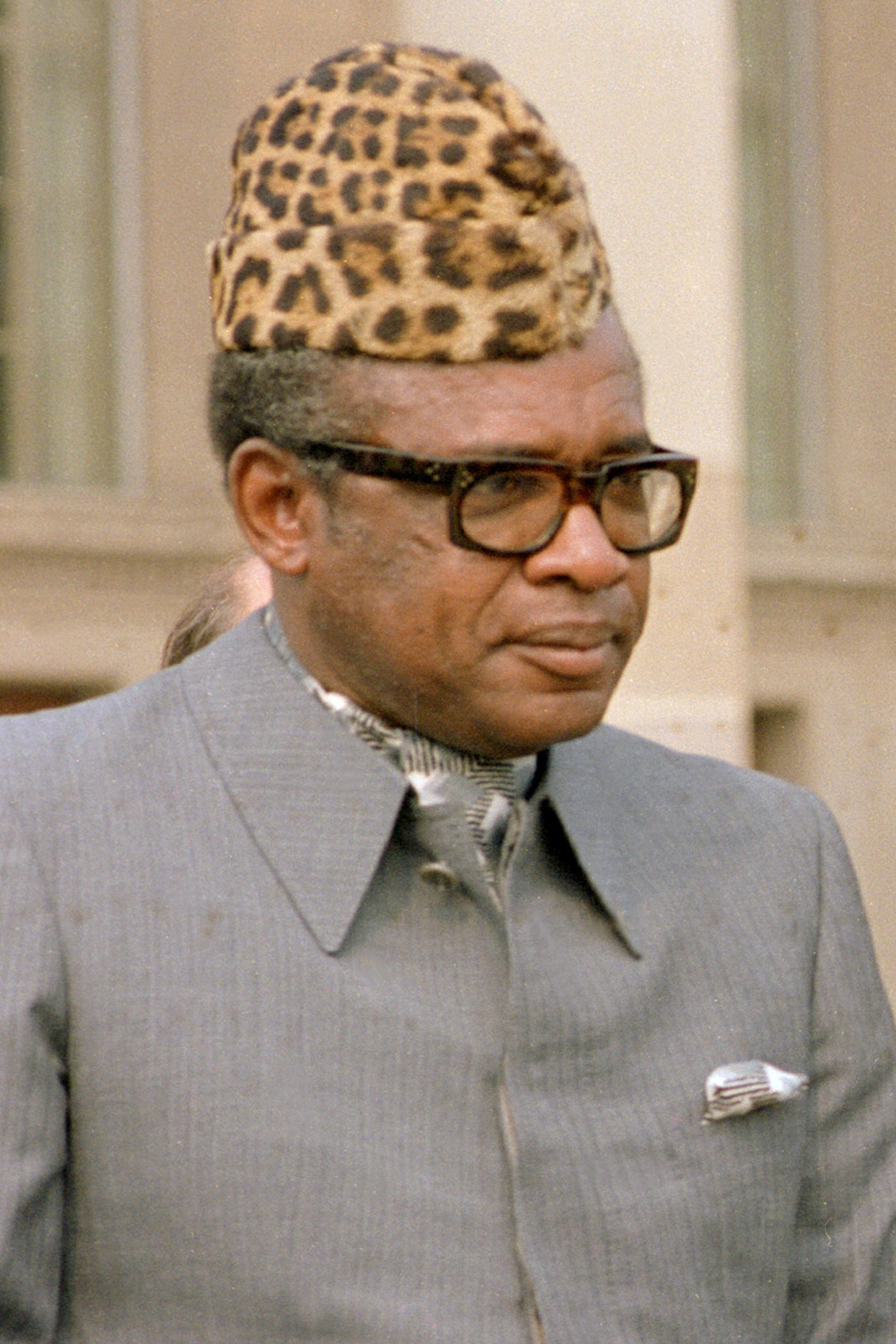
Under Mobutu Sese Seko's regime, the University of Kinshasa faced financial difficulties, political repression, and deteriorating infrastructure linked to the government's political and economic policies.

Following its re-establishment as a separate institution in 1981, UNIKIN continued to face financial difficulties throughout the decade. By 1985, the campus suffered from poor maintenance, including accumulated waste and deteriorating dormitories. The university cafeteria stopped serving meals, while professors' salaries fell to as little as $15 per month. As government funding declined, tuition was increased by 500 percent in 1985. On 22 September 1986, the government enacted Framework Law No. 86-005, which defined the structure and objectives of the national education system and the responsibilities of the state, educators, and private institutions. According to Nyembo, however, the law did little to address the structural problems affecting higher education.

In 1989, further budget cuts led UNIKIN to suspend nearly all scholarships and financial aid and introduce new student fees. During the 1980s, the government had provided up to 90 percent of the university's budget, with tuition accounting for only a small share of revenue. State support subsequently declined sharply; by 2002, the government contributed only $8,000 toward UNIKIN's estimated $4.3 million annual budget, although it separately covered some personnel costs. By the 2004–2005 academic year, enrollment stood at 23,250 students across ten faculties. The university had 508 academic and scientific staff and approximately 2,800 technical and administrative personnel.

During protests in 2004 and 2011 over campus conditions, including electricity outages, students set fire to the rector's residence while occupants were inside; neighbors intervened to help them escape. In 2008, a faculty dean received verbal and written death threats from students who had failed to meet the requirements for advancement to the next academic year. In June 2011, students also set fire to the rector's personal vehicle during a demonstration. On 9 December 2015, students called for the renovation of several deteriorating residence halls, including X, XX, XXX, 80, 150, and Vatican. Erosion also threatened some of the residences. With government funding, the Office of Roads and Drainage (OVD) carried out erosion-control work in the Trafic area of UNIKIN, including earth backfilling and the construction of drainage channels. Heavy rainfall had also damaged access roads, particularly around the Plateau des résidences des enseignants. In January 2020, student protests over increased academic fees led to clashes with police and the suspension of academic activities, after which 6,412 students were required to leave university residences.

On 10 February 2020, President Félix Tshisekedi launched a project to rehabilitate the residences. The renovation was overseen by the Intendance Générale (IG) and the Entreprise Générale de Construction de Kinshasa (EGECOK). UNIKIN's secretary-general for administration, Godefroid Kabengele Dibwe, later reported that 12 of the university's 14 residences had been renovated. The residences remained closed until 3 October 2023, when UNIKIN's Management Committee reopened them to students.

On 1 March 2022, UNIKIN rector Jean-Marie Kayembe Ntumba met with Finance Minister Nicolas Kazadi and a delegation from his ministry to launch a project to renovate and modernize the university's omnisports complex, which had fallen into disrepair. The project included renovations to the Olympic-sized swimming pool, grandstand, changing rooms, and other facilities. Further plans included renovating the main stadium, installing synthetic turf, expanding sports facilities, and improving drainage. On 8 December 2022, Ntumba inaugurated the rehabilitation of the site's internal roads, which had been pre-financed by EGECOK ahead of the 2023 Jeux de la Francophonie.

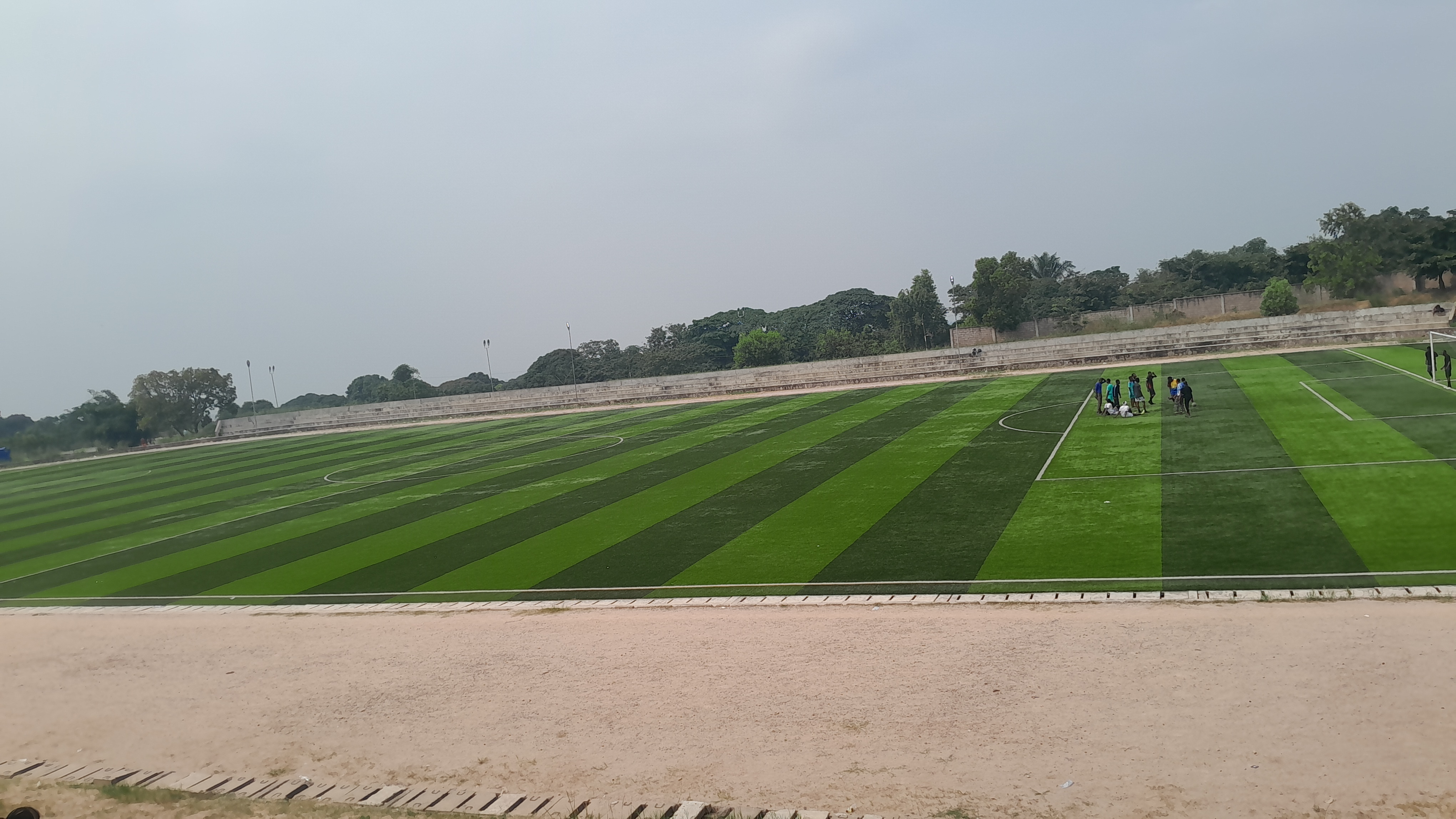
Football field

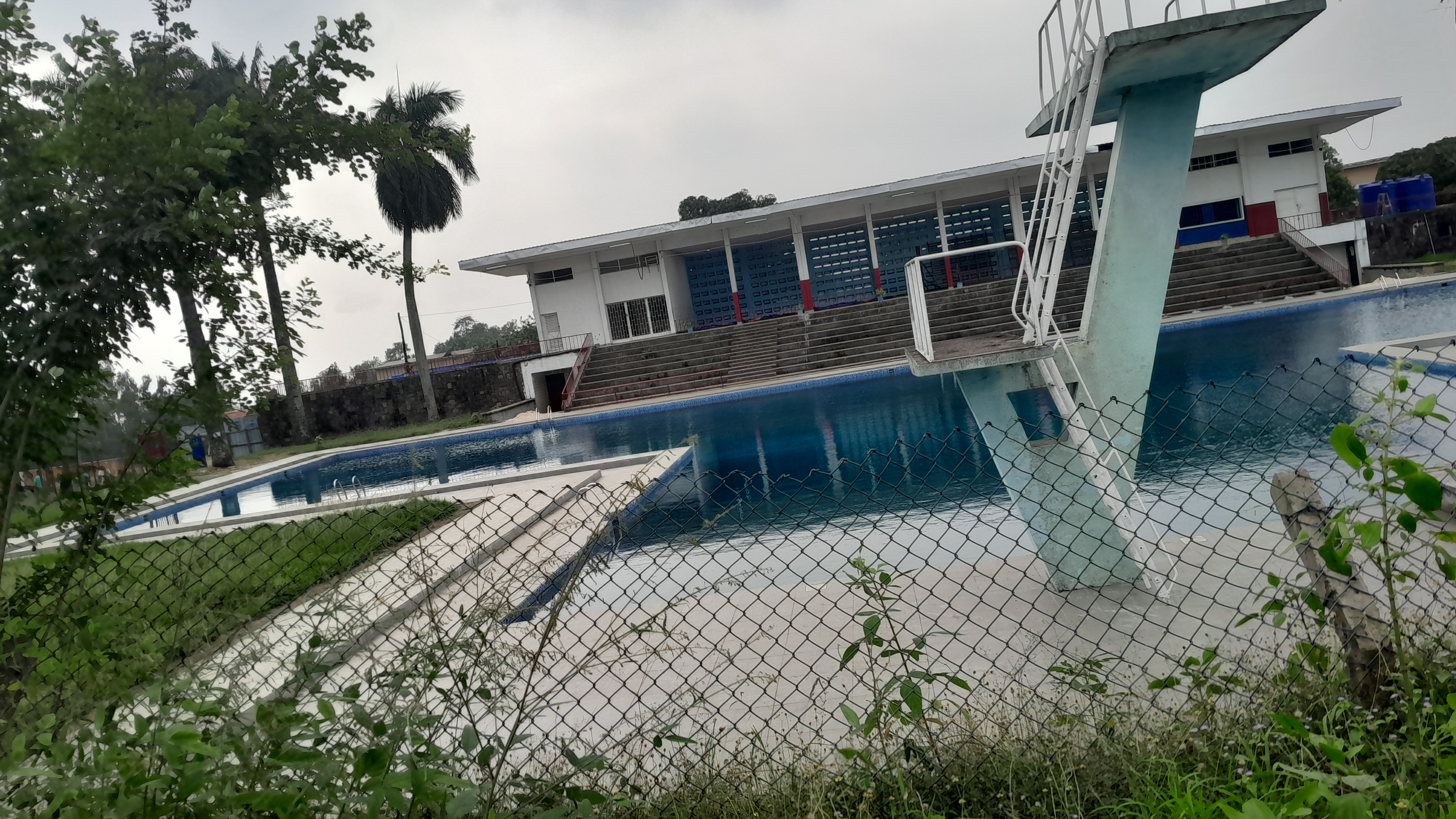
Olympic swimming pool

== Administration and academics ==
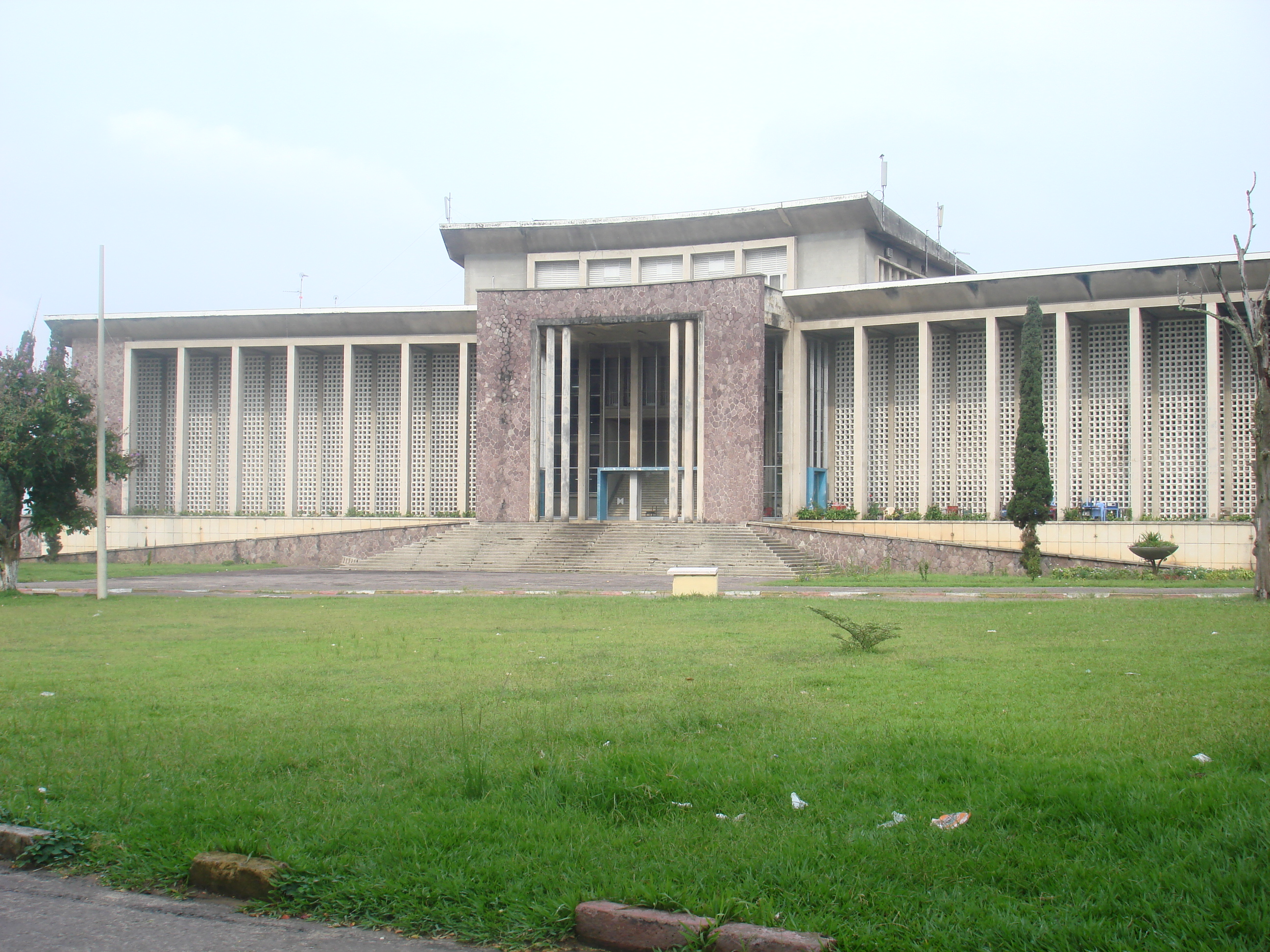
The Rectorat, main administrative building at the University of Kinshasa

The University of Kinshasa is administered by a Management Committee (Comité de gestion) headed by the rector. The rector chairs the Management Committee and the University Council and oversees the implementation of their decisions. The rector is appointed by the President of the Democratic Republic of the Congo on the recommendation of the minister responsible for higher education.

List of rectors:

Years	Rector	Term
Lovanium University		
1953–1954	Maurice Schurmans	15 January 1953 – 12 October 1954
1954–1967	Luc Gillon	1954–1967
1967–1971	Tharcisse Tshibangu Tshishiku	1967–1971
National University of Zaire		
1971–1972	Elungu Pene Elungu	November 1971 – September 1972
1972–1975	Eugene Lokwa Ilwaloma	22 September 1972 – August 1975
1975–1977	Albert Mpase Nselenge	August 1975 – December 1977
1977–1979	Félix Vundwawe te Pemako	December 1977 – September 1979
1979–1981	Léon de Saint Moulin	October 1979 – September 1981
1981–1982	Charles T. Hein	September 1981 – November 1982
University of Kinshasa		
1982–1983	Bokonga Ekanga Botombele	November 1982 – September 1983
1983–1986	Mpeye Nyango	September 1983 – August 1986
1986–1989	Bingoto Mandoko Na Mpeya	August 1986 – October 1989
1989–1991	Boguo Makeli	October 1989 – April 1991
1991–1991	Lombeya Bosongo	April 1991 – November 1991
1991–1993	Luabeya Mesua (acting)	November 1991 – May 1993
1993–1995	Gilbert Pindi-Mbensa Kifu (acting)	May 1993 – May 1995
1995–1996	Lumpungu Kamanda (acting)	June 1995 – November 1996
1996–1997	Tamba Vemba (acting)	November 1996 – July 1997
1997–2000	Télésphore Tsakala Munikengi (acting)	July 1997 – May 2000
2000–2001	Nestor Mpeye Nyango	May 2000 – July 2001
2001–2005	Josaphat Ndelo-di-Phanzu	July 2001 – 2005
2005–2009	Bernard Lututala Mumpasi	March 2005 – January 2009
2009–2010	Michel Kika Mavunda	January 2009 – February 2010
2010–2015	Jean Berchmans Labana Lasay Abar	February 2010 – 29 December 2015
2015–2021	Daniel Ngoma-Ya-Nzuzi	29 December 2015 – 2021
2021–present	Jean-Marie Kayembe Ntumba	2021–present

The Management Committee, appointed by the Minister of Higher and University Education (Ministre de l'Enseignement Supérieur et Universitaire; MESU), oversees the university's daily administration and consists of the rector, secretary-general for academic affairs, secretary-general for research, secretary-general for administration, and budget administrator. The secretary-general for academic affairs assists the Management Committee in coordinating and supervising academic and scientific services, including para-academic services, libraries, teaching units and collections, academic and scientific staff, student admissions and registration, course programs and schedules, teaching, examinations, academic degrees, and academic departments. If the rector is absent or unable to perform his duties, the secretary-general for academic affairs acts as the rector's representative. The secretary-general for research oversees research activities, doctoral supervision, scientific publications and missions, and scientific events and exchanges. The position is appointed by MESU from among academic staff holding at least the rank of professor. The secretary-general for administration assists the rector in coordinating and supervising the university's administrative services, including administrative and technical staff, social services for employees, student accommodation, and campus life. Six directorates report to the secretary-general for administration: Human Resources, Student Affairs, Cultural Affairs, Technical Services and Maintenance, Training, and Social Affairs. The budget administrator oversees the university's budgetary and financial matters and is appointed by MESU from among management-level administrative staff with at least a bachelor's degree and three years of experience in public finance or higher education administration.

The University Council implements the university's academic and scientific policies, including academic planning and staff matters. It proposes to the board of directors the number of teaching hours for each subject and the distribution of subjects across years of study, in consultation with the relevant faculties, departments, schools, institutes, and research centers. It also considers honorary degrees, proposes developments in academic activities, gives its opinion on the Management Committee's budget estimates, appoints and dismisses non-permanent academic staff, and proposes the appointment and promotion of academic staff, chefs de travaux, and management-level administrative staff.

The Faculty Council manages the faculty under the supervision of the Management Committee. It prepares teaching and research programs, oversees teaching and research, organizes student assessments, and advises on staff working outside the faculty. It also proposes course and examination schedules and examination panels to the Management Committee, proposes teaching hours and the creation of departments to the University Council, approves the dean's budget estimates and allocations, and gives its opinion on student admission and enrollment, staff appointments and promotions, new academic and scientific positions, and changes to teaching programs. The council meets monthly and whenever the dean or Management Committee considers it necessary.

Each department is headed by a department head (chef de département) appointed by the rector for a renewable three-year term and is governed by a Department Council. The council consists of academic staff, chefs de travaux, two assistant-lecturer representatives, and two student representatives. The department head is assisted by two secretaries responsible for teaching and research, who together form the department office. The office proposes teaching loads, advises on staff appointments and promotions, approves teaching and research programs, and organizes scientific meetings.

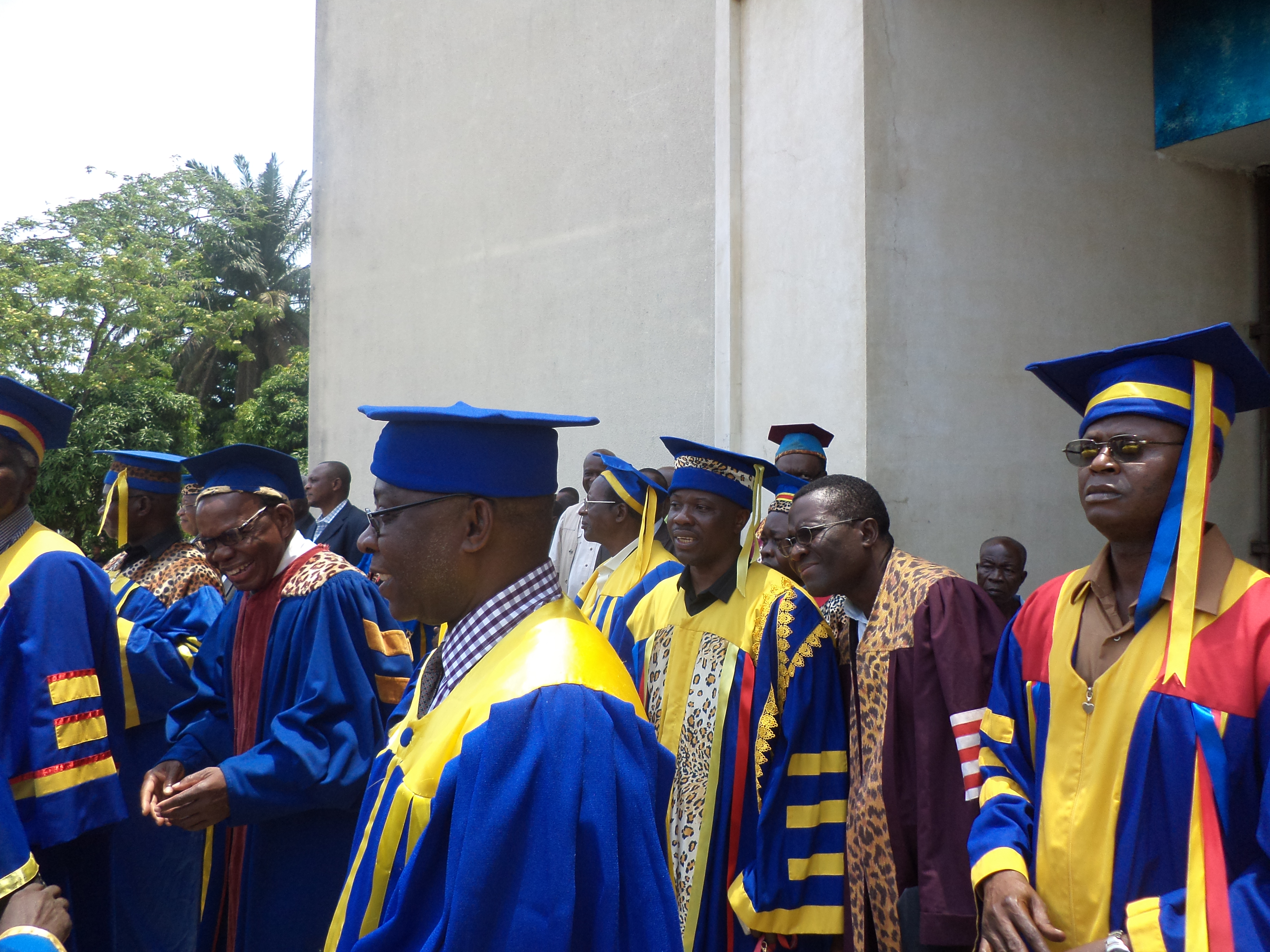
Professors of the university in academic dress

Across all faculties, UNIKIN offers a curriculum organized into three cycles. The first cycle consists of the graduat; the second cycle consists of the licence, as well as engineering training; and the third cycle consists of doctoral studies.

=== Faculties ===
- Faculty of Law
- Faculty of Economics and Management
- Faculty of Letters and Humanities
- Faculty of Medicine
- Faculty of Dentistry
- Faculty of Veterinary Medicine
- Faculty of Dental Medicine
- Faculty of Petroleum, Gas and New Energies
- Faculty of Engineering
- Faculty of Polytechnic
- Faculty of Psychology and Educational Sciences
- Faculty of Science and Technology
- Faculty of Agricultural Sciences
- Faculty of Pharmaceutical Sciences
- Faculty of Social, Administrative and Political Sciences

=== Medical schools ===
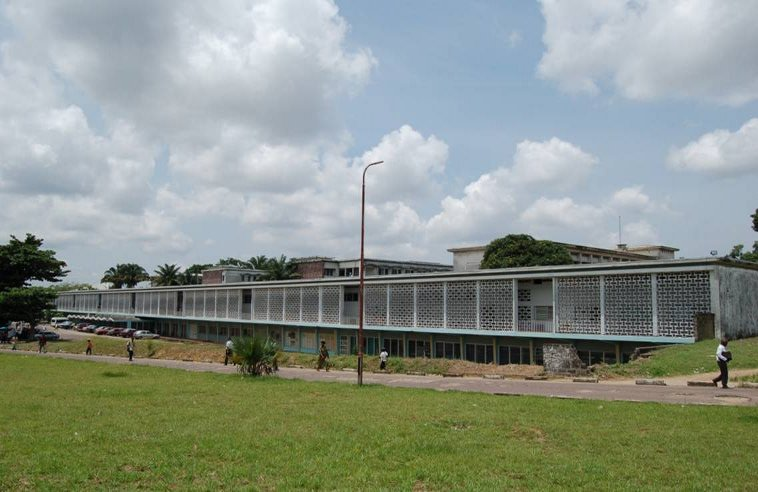
- University Clinics of Kinshasa (CUK)
  Kinshasa School of Public Health
- Kinshasa University Clinics (Cliniques Universitaires de Kinshasa; CUK)
- Neuropsychopathology Center (Centre Neuro-psychopathologique; CNPP)
- Mount Amba Hospital Center (Centre Hospitalier du Mont-Amba; CHMA)

=== Institutes and research centers ===
- Cardiology Center
- Interdisciplinary Center for Political Studies and Documentation (Centre Interdisciplinaire d'Etudes et de Documentation Politiques; CIEDOP)
- Institute for Studies and Historical Research on the Present Time (Institut d'Etudes et de Recherche Historique du Temps Présent)
- Institute for Economic and Social Research (Institut de Recherches Economiques et Sociales; IRES)
- Research Center for Development (Centre de Recherche pour le Développement)
- Research Center for the Exploitation of Renewable Energy (Centre de Recherche pour l'Exploitation de l'Energie Renouvelable)
- Laboratory for the Analysis of Medicines and Food (Laboratoire d’Analyses des Médicaments et des Aliments)
- Center for Parapsychological Studies and Research (Centre d'Etudes et des Recherches Parapsychologiques; CERP)

=== Regional Postgraduate Schools ===
- Regional Postgraduate School of Integrated Planning and Management of Tropical Forests and Territories (Ecole Régionale Postuniversitaire d'Aménagement et de Gestion Intégrés des Forêts et Territoire Tropicaux; ERAIFT)
- Economic Policy Management Program (Programme de Gestion de la Politique Economique; GPE)
- New Inter-University Third-Cycle Program in Economics (Nouveau Programme de Troisième Cycle Interuniversitaire en Economie; NPTCI)

=== Application Schools ===
- Mount Amba Medical Technical Institute (Institut Technique Médical du Mont-Amba; ITM-MA)
- Mount Amba School Group (Groupe Scolaire du Mont-Amba; GSMA)

=== Nuclear reactor ===
The first nuclear reactor in Africa was built at the University of Kinshasa in 1958. The reactor, known as TRICO I, is a TRIGA reactor built by General Atomics. TRICO stands for a combination of TRIGA or "Training Isotopes General Atomic" and Congo. The reactor was built while the country was still under Belgian control, and with the assistance of the United States government, under the Atoms For Peace program. TRIGA I was estimated to have a 50-kilowatt capacity and was shut down in 1970. In 1967, the African Union established a nuclear research center, the Regional Center for Nuclear Studies and the United States agreed to provide another TRIGA reactor. The second reactor, TRICO II, is believed to have a one-megawatt capacity and was brought online in 1972.

In 2001, the TRICO II reactor was reported to be operational, but was apparently put on standby in 1998. The government of the Democratic Republic of Congo stopped funding the program in the late 1980s, and the United States has since refused to ship replacement parts.

International observers have long been concerned about the safety and security of the two nuclear reactors and the enriched uranium they contain.

== Rankings ==
In the 2022 Eduranking, the university achieved a ranking of 62 out of 1,104 African universities. According to this ranking, UNIKIN holds the top position among the six higher education and university institutions in Kinshasa. Nationally, it leads the selection of 25 universities, and globally, it holds the 3063rd position out of 14,131 evaluated establishments.

== Public figures ==
=== Former teachers ===
- Marcel Lihau, lawyer
- Mabi Mulumba, Congolese politician

=== Notable alumni ===
- Kudianga Bayokisa, Congolese lawyer and politician, Minister of Trade
- Didier Etumba, Congolese military officer
- Sylvestre Ilunga, Congolese politician
- Webe Kadima, Congolese academic
- Emmanuel Ramazani Shadary, Congolese politician
- Alain Daniel Shekomba, Congolese businessman, politician and physicist
- Jacqueline Penge Sanganyoi, Congolese politician
- Steve Wembi, Congolese criminologist and investigative journalist

== See also ==
- List of universities in the Democratic Republic of the Congo
- Education in the Democratic Republic of the Congo
