= Luz Alvarez Martinez =

American activist for reproductive rights

- Born: 1943 (age 81–82); California, U.S.
- Occupation: Activist
- Years active: 1977–present
- Known for: Reproductive justice activism

Luz Alvarez Martinez (born 1943) is an American activist and leader in the movement for reproductive justice. She co-founded the National Latina Health Organization, the first national feminist health organization for Latinas in the United States, in 1986. She was an early supporter of the United Farm Workers, and a feminist and environmentalist.

== Early life ==
Luz Alvarez Martinez's parents were born in Guanajuato, Mexico and had immigrated to the United States in the early 1920s, settling in El Rio, California. Luz Alvarez Martinez grew up in California, where her Catholic farmworker family owned a home in San Leandro and worked the fields in Fremont, Gilroy and Santa Rosa. She was one of 12 children. Luz attended Lincoln School and St. Leander's Grammar School (graduated 1956) in San Leandro and completed high school in Oakland at St. Elizabeth's High School, graduating in 1960.

Following her graduation from high school, Alvarez Martinez began working as a secretary for the Alameda County Probation Department. There, she met a white probation officer whom she began dating at age 19; the two married in May 1964, when she was 21.

Alvarez Martinez enrolled at Merritt College for the fall 1964 semester following encouragement from her husband, but took time off following the birth of her first children, twins, in late December 1964. The family moved to the Lake Shore neighborhood of Oakland in 1967. She ave birth to a third son in 1968 and later adopted a fourth son through the Children's Home Society in the early 1970s. When her children were young, she was a full-time homemaker. Alvarez Martinez has described her marriage as "hard", and the two divorced in 1981, after 17 years of marriage.

== Activism ==
In the 1960s, Alvarez Martinez began "consciousness-raising" through her exposure to the Black Panthers and protests against the Vietnam War. She also began questioning the doctrine of the Catholic Church after being told she couldn't use birth control to space out her children; she chose to use birth control anyway.

In 1977, Alvarez Martinez reentered Merritt College to study to become a nurse midwife; there, she became involved in feminist issues through the Berkeley Women's Health Collective. Motivated by political concerns and personal experiences, she attended the first national conference of the Black Women's Health Project in 1983. In 1986, she co-founded the National Latina Health Organization in Oakland, CA with health educators Alicia Bejarano and Paulita Ortiz, and community activist Elisabeth Gastelumendi.

Their group, the first national feminist health organization for Latinas in the United States, adopted tools of the women's health movement, which encouraged women to tell their own stories and take an active role in their healing. Latinas face neglect and abuse by the medical system, and the group raised awareness about discrimination and barriers to access. Alvarez Martinez served as its executive director until retiring in 2005. Soon after, the organization ceased operations.

In April 1992, Alvarez Martinez organized a protest against a reproductive rights march held by NOW in Washington, D.C., on the grounds that NOW had not made an effort to include women of color in the march.

In 1997, she also co-founded SisterSong Women of Color Reproductive Health Collective. Alvarez Martinez was an important contributor to the reproductive justice movement created by women of color in the US, and she often represented Latina perspectives on reproductive rights on the national stage, at conferences and in advocacy organizations such as the National Abortion Rights and Access League (NARAL) on whose board she served. She worked with other leaders at SisterSong, such as Loretta Ross, to challenge the implicitly white focus of mainstream feminist organizations such as the National Organization for Women (NOW). Alvarez Martinez has also served on the Minority Women's Health Panel of Experts of the National Office of Women's Health (1997–2005), and on the Women's Health Council of the Office of Women's Health of the State of California.

== Publications ==
- Homenaje a Nuestras Curanderas/ Honoring Our Healers (1996, Latina Press)

== Personal life ==
Alvarez Martinez has four sons and three grandchildren. Since 1993 she has been an Aztec ceremonial dancer.

== See also ==
- National Latina Institute for Reproductive Justice
- Latina Roundtable on Health and Reproductive Rights
- SisterSong Women of Color Reproductive Health Collective
- Loretta Ross
- Reproductive Justice

== Bibliography ==
- Ross, Loretta, Elena Gutiérrez, Marlene Gerber, and Jael Silliman. "13: The National Latina Health Organization," in Undivided Rights: Women of Color Organizing for Reproductive Justice. Chicago: Haymarket Books, 2016. pp. 247–273.
- "Luz Alvarez Martinez," Notable Hispanic American Women. Gale In Context: Biography. 1993.
- Lara, Irene. “Latina Health Activist-Healers Bridging Body and Spirit.” Women & Therapy 31, no. 1 (2008): 21–40. https://doi.org/10.1300/02703140802145169
- Levenstein, Lisa. They Didn’t See Us Coming: The Hidden History of Feminism in the Nineties. New York: Basic Books, 2020. ISBN 9780465095285.
- Norsigian J. "Our Bodies Ourselves and the Women's Health Movement in the United States: Some Reflections." Am J Public Health. 2019 Jun;109(6):844-846. doi: 10.2105/AJPH.2019.305059.
