= Latina Roundtable on Health and Reproductive Rights =

American reproductive rights organization

Latina Roundtable on Health and Reproductive Rights (LRHRR) was a Latina reproductive rights organization based in New York City.

== History ==
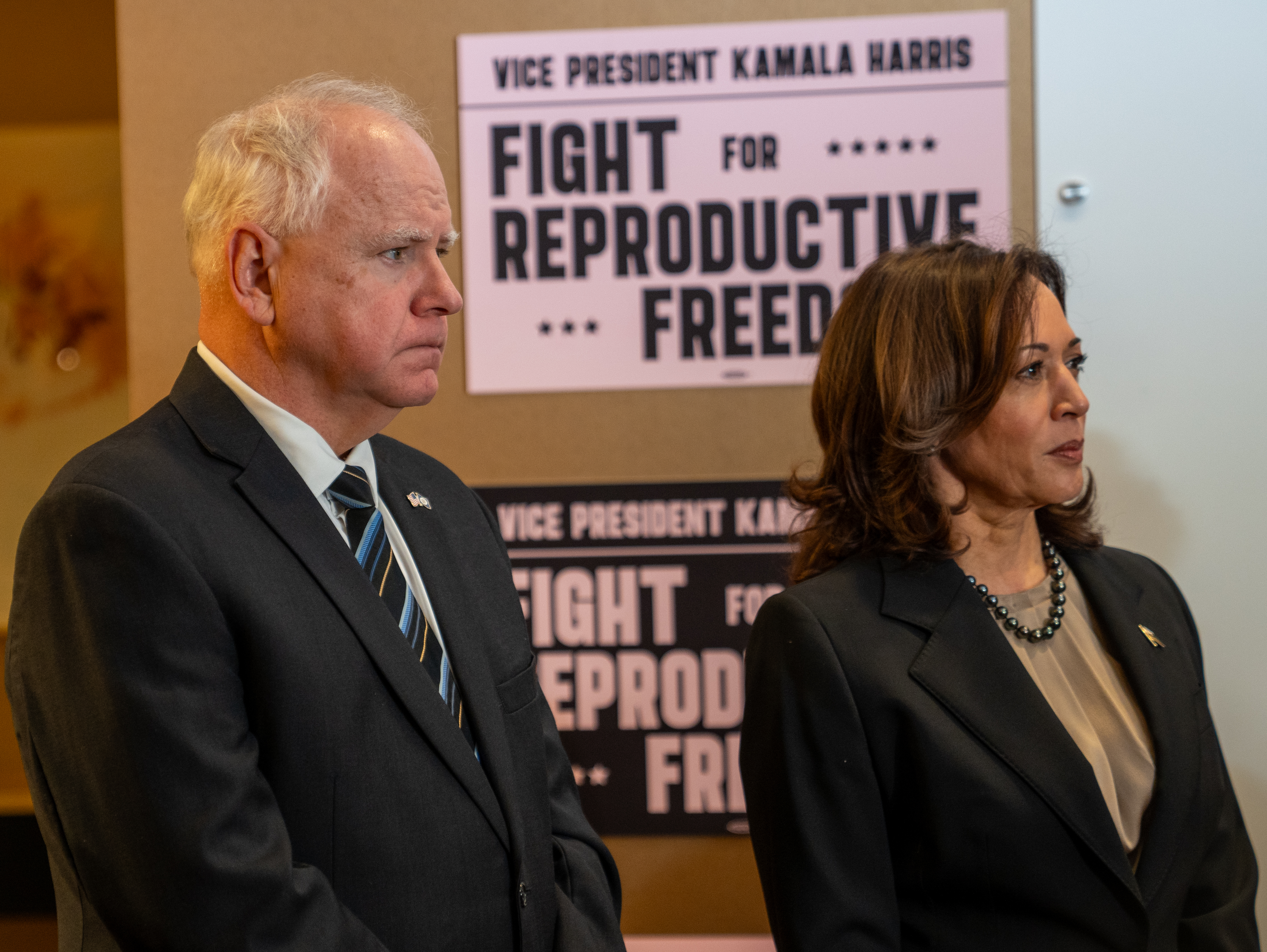
Vice President Kamala Harris and Minnesota Governor Tim Walz visit an abortion clinic in Saint Paul, Minnesota on 14 March 2024

Latina Roundtable on Health and Reproductive Rights was founded in New York City by a group of Latina organizers in October 1989. LRHRR was the only visible organization for women of color in the state that was dedicated to advocating for greater access to health care and reproductive services for Latinas. The organization viewed health care as part of a community based approach that integrated health and social services holistically and formed diverse coalitions to discuss religious and cultural norms of Latinas and their effect on available healthcare. These discussions led the LRHRR created an analysis and action plan of policies most affecting healthcare for Latinas. The first executive director was Wilma Montanez, and was succeeded by Luz Rodriguez in 1996.

In 1992, LRHRR organized a clinic to train more than 5,000 individuals to keep abortion protesters from interfering with clinics during Operation Rescue's abortion protests in the South Bronx.

In 1997 and 1998, LRHRR led meetings with sixteen different women of color organizations about reproductive tract infections among women of color which started discussions about the need for a collective vision to promote research and reproductive justice advocacy for women of color. Rodriguez later secured a $60,000 grant from the Ford Foundation to establish the SisterSong Women of Color Reproductive Justice Collective in 1997.

In 1998, the LRHRR closed its doors due to poor infrastructure.

== See also ==
- National Latina Institute for Reproductive Justice
- Luz Alvarez Martinez
