= Loretta Ross =

American activist and writer (born 1953)

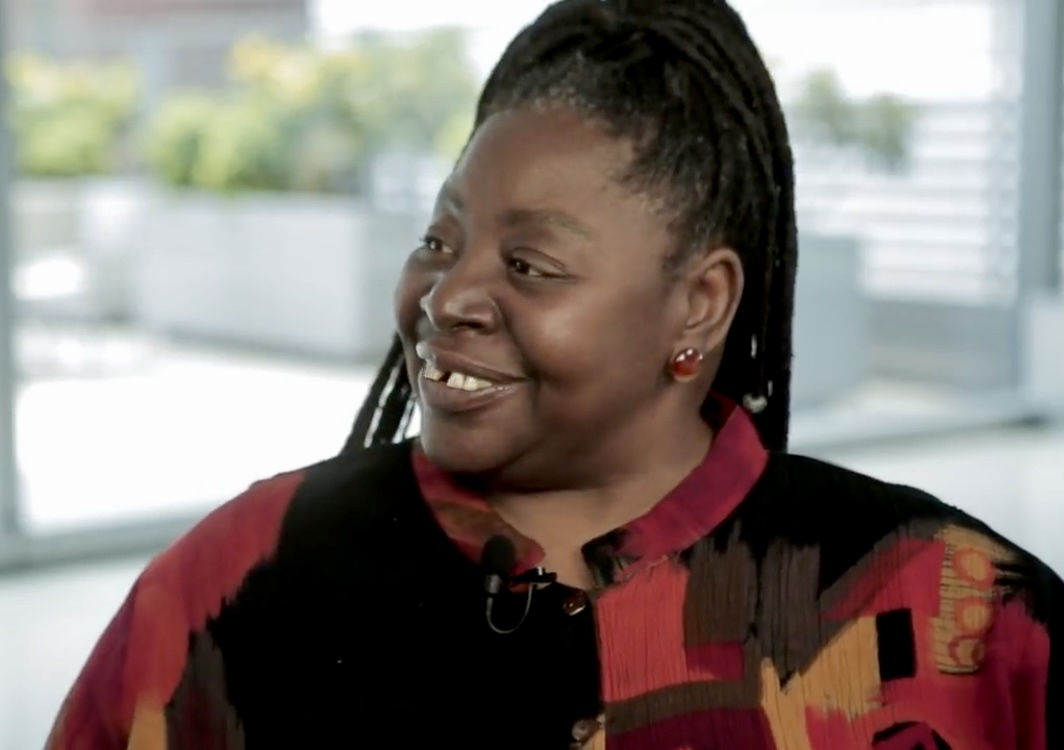
- Ross in 2017
- Born: Loretta June Ross; August 16, 1953 (age 73); Temple, Texas, U.S.
- Education: Howard University; Agnes Scott College (BA); Emory University
- Occupations: Feminist; activist

Loretta J. Ross (born August 16, 1953) is an American academic, feminist, and activist who advocates for reproductive justice, especially among women of color. As an activist, Ross has written on reproductive justice activism and the history of African American women.

== Early life and education ==
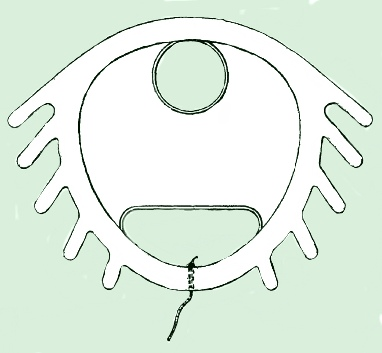
2013 sketch of a Dalkon Shield; Ross was one of the first women of color who won the lawsuit against A.H. Robbins for their defective IUD (intrauterine device).

Ross was born in Temple, Texas on August 16, 1953, the sixth of eight children in a blended family. Her father, who immigrated from Jamaica, was an Army weapons specialist and drill sergeant. He retired from the military in 1963, worked for the Post Office, and held odd jobs to support his family. Ross' mother worked as a domestic worker and owned a music store, but was a stay-at-home mother while Ross was growing up. For her primary education, Ross attended integrated schools: Army schools through second grade, then public schools. She was double-promoted in elementary grades and was an honors student in high school. Ross' grades were high and she received honors during her school years. She was driven to excel in school so that she could have a good job and not have to do housework like her mother.

In 1964, at age 11, Ross was raped by a stranger. Three years later, Ross was raped by her distant cousin. Abortion was not a legal option in 1969; she gave birth to her son, Howard, as a result of the rape. Ross lost her scholarship from Radcliffe College of Harvard University when she decided to keep her son instead of placing him up for adoption. At age 16, she got pregnant again from consensual sex with her first boyfriend. However, abortion was legal in D.C and she was able to safely terminate the pregnancy.

In 1970, Ross attended Howard University for her tertiary education after being denied admission to Radcliffe after officials found out about her child. During her undergraduate career at Howard, she became actively involved in black nationalist politics, civil rights movements (feminism and anti-racism), and tenant organizing. Ross joined a Marxist–Leninist discussion group called the D.C. Study Group, and the South Africa Support Project.

In 1976, at age 23, Ross experienced sterilization abuse when she was rendered sterile with the Dalkon Shield, an intrauterine device that was marketed despite being found to be defective. The device caused major negative health consequences to its users, particularly African American and poor communities. The Dalkon Shield DUI also didn't just affect a disproportionate amount African Americans, but also the people of South Africa;in which a theme shows up of what this pharmaceutical company, Dalkon Shield,decided what was more valuable, their revenue or their consumers. of Loretta Ross received the Dalkon Shield at Howard University from a health clinic free of charge. This device caused her to develop a pelvic inflammatory disease, which she endured for six months. During these six months, her concerns were brushed off. Clinic staff told her that her problem stemmed from a rare STD caught by having sex with GI soldiers that had come back from Vietnam. However, she did not know any GIs. After six months of dealing with her disease brought on by Dalkon Shield, she developed a severe infection which resulted in a coma. After waking up from the coma, she learned that the doctors had performed a total hysterectomy. Ross says that her doctor visited her after the surgery was complete and wrongly assumed that she would be happy to no longer need the usage of birth control or deal with menstruation. Ross was among the first women of color to win the lawsuit against the manufacturer of the Dalkon Shield, A.H. Robins. This incident convinced Ross that her sterilization was a form of population control due to the birth control being given for free at a historically Black college, and became extremely vocal around issues regarding reproductive rights. In November 1980, the murder of her close friend and political ally, Yulanda Ward, became a turning point in Ross' life as an activist. Yulanda Ward was a co-chairwoman of the District's City Wide Housing Coalition; she was mysteriously shot and killed in the midst of a street robbery. Ross has referred to this murder as a political assassination.

In 2007, Ross completed her bachelor's degree at Agnes Scott College. Under the direction of professor Elizabeth Hackett, Ross wrote Just Choices: Women of Color, Reproductive Health and Human Rights, her capstone Women's Studies independent study project at Agnes Scott. She is pursuing her PhD in Women's Studies at Emory University in Atlanta, Georgia.

In 2018, she was hired by Arizona State University to teach a 400-level course on Reproductive Justice, a topic on which she has co-authored three books.

In 2019, she joined the faculty of Smith College as a Visiting Associate Professor of the Study of Women & Gender.

== Feminism and activism ==
Ross has stated that she believes the feminist movement has predominately been led by white women. These women have primarily put their focus on issues such as reproductive choice and abortion rights. Their focused agenda also includes equal pay, birth control access, voting rights, and more. However, this does not include issues that disproportionately affect minorities and women of color. Ross emphasizes social issues such as pervasive poverty and the mass incarceration of reproductive-aged people. She is passionate that these examples of racism be highlighted and targeted just as much as the other issues at hand. She also feels as though the fact that these issues aren't addressed is an example of racism in this country itself and demonstrates how deeply embedded it is into our country and its beliefs. These bouts of racism, she believes, are shown in both very obvious and apparent ways while others reveal themselves as microaggressions.Ross has stated how she empathizes with people who have been through similar hardships that she has had to endure, while also realizing that some people have gone through worse

In 1977, Ross and a group of black and minority activists coined the term "women of color" at the National Women's Conference as a unifying term to address political and social issues. Through this, Ross was able to ensure that all minority women were included in the conversation without insensitivity. For a very long time, the term "colored" was used, and that word's association with racism in America was extremely unsettling and dehumanizing. Adding the phrase "women of color" into the rhetoric allowed for minorities, especially black women, to be respectfully discussed in the manner of reproductive justice without sparking any discomfort. The coining of this term expresses Ross's inclusive stance.

Driven by her personal experience as a survivor of sexual assault, in 1979, Ross became the third executive director of the D.C. Rape Crisis Center, the first rape crisis center that was primarily run by and geared toward providing resources for women of color. The Rape Crisis Center is an organization that aims to prepare stakeholders in the situation of sexual assault. This is performed through proper training that centers compassion, dignity, and respect. The Rape Crises Center is vocal about providing support no matter the demographic of the person seeking assistance, a principle that Ross has exhibited throughout her career.

In August 1980, Ross, accompanied by others from the DC Rape Crisis Center, organized the First National Conference on Third World Women and Violence in Washington, DC. This was the first conference that brought together women from different racial backgrounds, unifying the participants towards achieving the goal of cultivating a new, holistic network for people of color, both women and men, to advocate for anti-violence activism. There were concerns that not much work would be done because of the mixing of numerous different backgrounds, but because of the work done by Ross and others, the event proved to be a great success that allowed for different experiences to be heard and understood by others from various perspectives.

In 1985, the National Organization for Women (NOW) hired Ross to be the director of the Women of Color Programs to both improve participation by women of color in NOW, create coalitions with organizations focused on issues affecting women of color, and to respond to criticism by women of color who felt mainstream feminist organizations were ignoring issues of race and class. By hiring Ross, a strong voice in the reproductive justice community, they hoped to show their support of issues that are unique to women of color. This partnership allowed for the feminist movement to cross barriers that had not been acknowledged in the mainstream. Ross organized women of color delegations for the pro-choice marches NOW sponsored in 1986 and 1989, and organized the first national conference on Women of Color and Reproductive Rights in 1987.

Ross organized delegations for black women in pro-choice marches that were sponsored by NOW in 1986 and 1989. In response to the Supreme Court's Webster decision in 1989, Ross co-coordinated production of the pathbreaking statement "We Remember: African American Women Are For Reproductive Freedom." This popular brochure was successfully distributed over 250,000 copies. The pamphlet emphasizes the right to reproductive choice, especially for black women in America. It connects the history of anti-black racism and misogyny with the right to bodily autonomy, highlighting moments like the Jim Crow era.

As Program Director (1989–90) for the National Black Women's Health Project (now known as the Black Women's Health Imperative), she coordinated the first national conference of African American women for reproductive rights. From 1980 to 1988, she was a member of the D.C. Commission on Women. From 1991 to 1995, Ross was National Program Research Director for the Center for Democratic Renewal (formerly the National Anti-Klan Network), where she directed projects on right-wing organizations in South Africa, Klan and neo-Nazi involvement in anti-abortion violence, and human rights education in the U.S. CDR is a non-profit clearinghouse that provides information on hate groups which include the Ku Klux Klan and neo-Nazi movement. Ross managed the research and program departments and was the director of specific projects. These projects include human rights education in the U.S., right wing organizations in South Africa, and Klan and neo-Nazi involvement in anti-abortion violence. In addition to her activism in CDR, she produced their quarterly newsletter, The Monitor, as well as monthly intelligence reports on far right activities,The Activist Update. In 1996 she created the National Center for Human Rights Education, a training and resource center for grassroots activists aimed at applying a human rights analysis to injustices in the U.S. Active internationally, Ross is a founding member of the International Council of African Women and of the Network of East-West Women. She has been a regular participant in International Women and Health Meetings and helped organize the delegation of 1100 African American women to the International Conference on Population and Development in Cairo in 1984. She attended United Nations Women's Conferences in Copenhagen, Nairobi, and Beijing.

In 1997, with Luz Rodriguez and 14 others, Ross co-founded SisterSong Women of Color Reproductive Justice Collective which aims to build an effective network between individuals in advocating improvements within institutional policies that impact the reproductive lives of marginalized communities. Ross served as the National Coordinator for the SisterSong Women of Color Reproductive Justice Collective from 2005 until 2012. Some notable contributions of SisterSong include linking Black Lives Matter and reproductive justice, a billboard campaign that included a film titled Maafa 21, and the collaboration of Planned Parenthood with reproductive justice.

Ross was one of the African American women who first coined the term "reproductive justice," with the aim to frame the pursuit of reproductive justice using the social justice framework.

Ross acted as National Co-director for women of color of Washington, D.C.'s March for Women's Lives on April 25, 2004. She was the Founder and executive director of Atlanta, Georgia's National Center for Human Rights Education (NCHRE), the USA Partner of the Peoples' Decade of Human Rights Education from 1996 to 2004. NCHRE is a training center for activists and is based in Atlanta, Georgia. This organization prioritizes the education of grassroots organizations on topics such as human rights and legislation. Through this, the NCHRE aims to highlight the knowledge and resources that are available so they can be used and applied effectively. The organization's goal is to educate Americans about injustices that are often overlooked, promotes accountability, and addresses abuses of power and disenfranchisement. The NCHRE gives voices to those who may not have otherwise be heard, which is a goal of Ross' work.

Ross has testified on women's health and civil rights issues in many important settings including the UN, U.S. Congress, and the FDA. She has also made appearances on the talk shows: The Donahue Show, The Charlie Rose Show, and Good Morning America.

In 2022, Ross was named a MacArthur Fellow for her work as an advocate of Reproductive Justice and Human Rights in "shaping a visionary paradigm linking social justice, human rights, and reproductive justice."

== Writing and teaching ==
Ross has published books on reproductive justice, as well as many articles on black women and abortion. In 2004, Ross co-authored Undivided Rights: Women of Color Organizing for Reproductive Justice, a book that uncovers the unrevealed history of the activism of women of color in organizing for reproductive justice. Ross contributed her insights in a chapter entitled "The Color of Choice" in Color of Violence: The INCITE! Anthology, which was published in 2016. Currently, Ross is working on her soon-to-be published book entitled Black Abortion that will focus on reproductive rights issues.

In 2014, Ross published an article on sterilization, tying it back to her own experience that had forced her own sterilization. Her article, Sterilization and Reproductive Oppression in Prisons, focuses on women prisoned in the state of California who are being illegally sterilized even forty years after sterilization abuse guidelines were put into place at both the federal and state level. Despite the illusion of the end of sterilization monstrosities, in 2006–2010 more than 116 females in California prisons were illegally sterilized via a form of birth control. They were forced to undergo tubal ligation during delivery and labor. Ross's article highlights over dozens of women from minority groups - prisoners of black, Latina, transgender, and indigent women who faced forced hysterectomies under abusive and illegal circumstances.

Ross served as a visiting associate professor in the Women's Studies department at Hampshire College for the 2017-2018 academic year, teaching a course called "White Supremacy in the Age of Trump." She also recently served as a Visiting Clinical Professor at Arizona State University in the School of Social Transformation teaching a 400-level course on Reproductive Justice. Ross is currently serving as both a visiting professor in the department of the Study of Women and Gender and as a consultant at Smith College, where she is drawing from her personal archives to expand the Sophia Smith Collection.

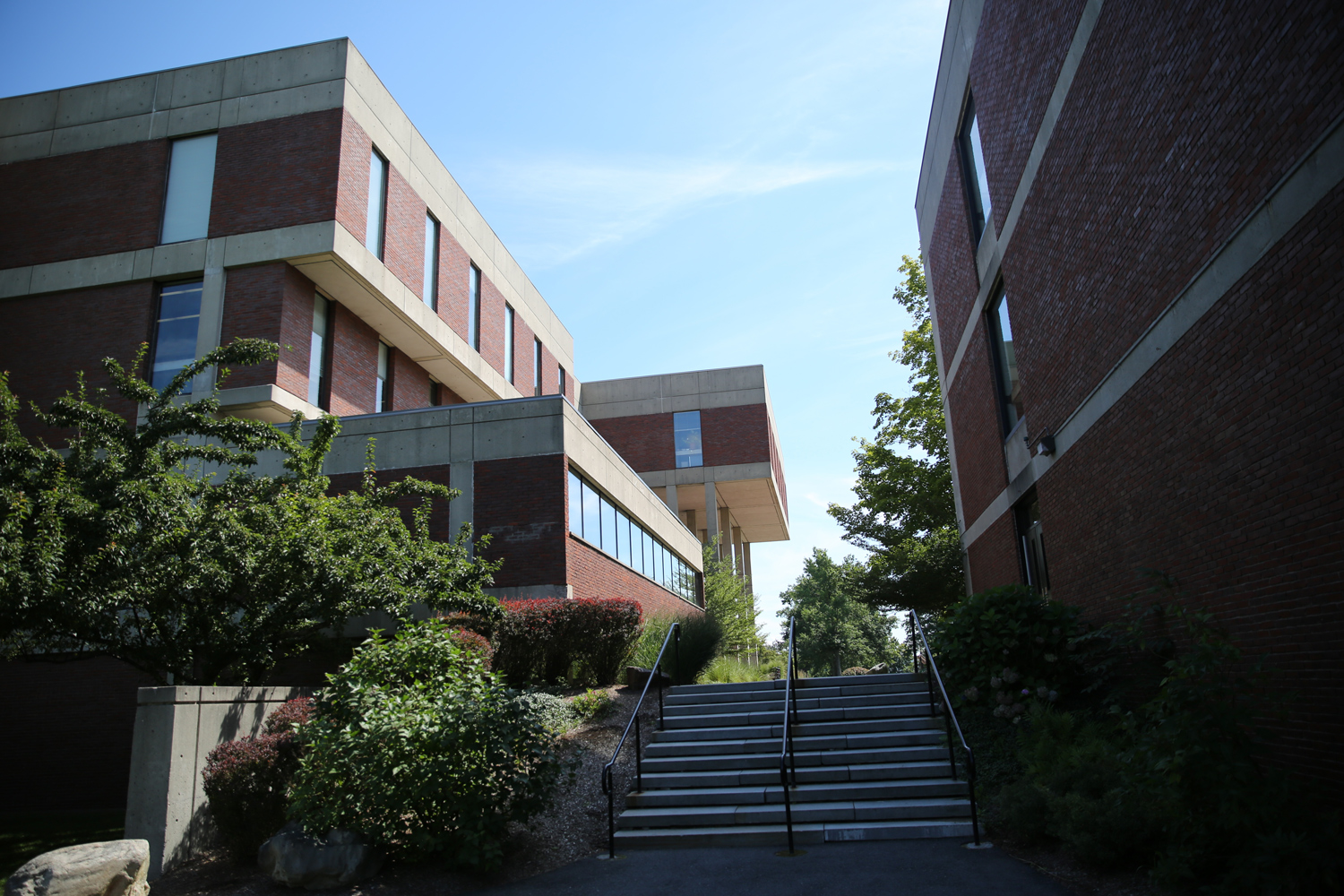
From 2017 to 2018, Ross was a visiting associate professor in the Women's Studies department at Hampshire College, teaching the course "White Supremacy in the Age of Trump."

Alongside Rickie Solinger, Ross co-authored Reproductive Justice: An Introduction, which details the field of reproductive justice, particularly in regards to experiences involving women of color and through a human rights analytical lens. Her most recent book, Radical Reproductive Justice was published by Feminist Press in 2017 and co-edited by Lynn Roberts, Erika Derkas, Whitney Peoples, and Pamela Bridgewater-Toure, discusses over two decades of works of SisterSong.

Recently Ross has spoken out against "call-out culture" and has written and released a book entitled Calling In: How to Start Making Change with Those You'd Rather Cancel. The book was due to be published in 2022, but was finally released in February 2025, by Simon & Schuster. In addition to her book, she has also published an article about finding cancel culture toxic. This article is titled I'm a Black Feminist. I Think Call-Out Culture Is Toxic. In her article, she touches on her own experiences with call-outs. She reveals that when she started in 1970, she found herself criticizing white women who did not understand black women. She points out the mistakes she made in expecting them to simply comprehend the experiences of women of color. Ross points out that call-outs can invoke fear of being targeted which tends to make people avoid conversations that could have been educational.

Since the beginning of the COVID-19 pandemic in 2020, Ross has provided online classes on her website, including "White Supremacy in the Age of Trump" and "Calling in the Calling Out Culture".

== Media appearances ==
Ross has appeared on the following North American television series and networks: NPR, CNN, BET, "Lead Story," Good Morning America, The Phil Donahue Show, Democracy Now!, "The Laura Flanders Show," and "The Charlie Rose Show", Oprah Winfrey Radio, The New York Times, and the Los Angeles Times.

Ross was featured in the book "The Persuaders: At the Front Lines of the Fight for Hearts, Minds and Democracy" by Anand Giridharadas.

== Awards and honors ==
=== Honorary degrees ===
- Doctorate of Civil Law from Arcadia University (2003)
- Doctorate from Smith College (2013)

=== Selected awards ===
- Black Women's Health Imperative, Community Health Activist Award (2008)
- Delta Sigma Theta, Pinnacle Leadership Award (2008)
- International Black Women's Congress, Oni Award (2010)
- Women Helping Women, Revolutionary Award (2011)
- Foundation for Black Women's Wellness Legacy Award (2015)
- National Women's Health Network Barbara Seaman Award for Activism in Women's Health (2015)
- Woodhull Sexual Freedom Network, Vicky Award (2017)
- Robert Coles "Call of Service" Award, Phillips Brooks House Association at Harvard University (2022)
- MacArthur Foundation Fellow (2022)
- National Women's Hall of Fame inductee (2024)

== Works ==
- Calling In: How to Start Making Change with Those You'd Rather Cancel (2025), Simon and Schuster ISBN 978-1982190798
- Reproductive Justice: An Introduction (2017) Oakland, Calif.: University of California Press (with Rickie Solinger) ISBN 9780520288188
- Radical Reproductive Justice: Foundation, Theory, Practice, Critique (2017) New York: Feminist Press at the City University of New York. ISBN 9781558614376
- "The Color of Choice: White Supremacy and Reproductive Justice" in Color of Violence: The INCITE! Anthology (2016) Durham: Duke University Press. ISBN 9780822363057
- Undivided Rights: Women of Color Organizing for Reproductive Justice, 2004.
- Just Choices: Women of Color, Reproductive Health and Human Rights (2001) Decatur, Ga.: Agnes Scott College.
- Women's Watch: Violence in the Anti-Abortion Movement (1995) Atlanta, Ga.: Center for Democratic Renewal.

== See also ==
- Black feminism
