= SisterSong =

Activist group

SisterSong Women of Color Reproductive Justice Collective
- Formation: 1997; 29 years ago
- Purpose: Reproductive justice
- Headquarters: Atlanta
- Website: www.sistersong.net

The SisterSong Women of Color Reproductive Justice Collective, also known as SisterSong, is a national activist organization dedicated to reproductive justice for women of color.

Headquartered in Atlanta, Georgia, SisterSong is a national membership organization with a focus on the Southern United States. They include and represent Indigenous, Black, Asian and Pacific Islander, Arab and Middle Eastern, Latinx, and queer women and trans people. SisterSong says that they strive to center the needs of the most marginalized people of color, such as people with low incomes, young mothers, people with criminalization experience, people with HIV/AIDS, sex workers, people with disabilities, and LGBTQ people. Membership also includes White and male allies.

SisterSong has built a movement that now includes many independent organizations across the country, and they remain a movement thought leader, trainer, convener, organizer, and collaboration facilitator. Monica Simpson has served as executive director since 2012.

== History ==
=== Origins of reproductive justice ===
In 1994, just before attending the International Conference on Population and Development in Cairo (at which international leaders would agree that the individual right to plan one's own family must be central to global development, rather than population control efforts), a group of black women gathered for a conference sponsored by the Illinois Pro-Choice Alliance and the Ms. Foundation for Women. Their goal was to create a statement about the Clinton administration's proposed Universal Health Care plan. In the process, they coined "reproductive justice" as a combination of "reproductive rights" and "social justice." The women who created the reproductive justice framework were: Toni M. Bond Leonard, Reverend Alma Crawford, Evelyn S. Field, Terri James, Bisola Marignay, Cassandra McConnell, Cynthia Newbille, Loretta Ross, Elizabeth Terry, Mable Thomas, Winnette P. Willis, and Kim Youngblood. They launched the reproductive justice framework by publishing a full-page statement titled "Black Women on Universal Health Care Reform" with over 800 signatures in The Washington Post and Roll Call using the concept of reproductive justice in a criticism of the Clinton health care plan.

These women believed that the creation of reproductive justice was necessary because they felt that the mainstream women's rights movement was led by and focused on the needs of middle class White women and did not meet the needs of women of color. In their view, the pro-choice framework focused on maintaining abortion rights and did not take into account the many ways that women of color and other marginalized women and trans people have difficulty accessing abortion even in places where it is legally allowed. The creators of reproductive justice also felt that the pro-choice framework did not align with the experiences of women of color, who often feel that the impact of systemic oppression limits their possibilities, so their reproductive lives are not guided by the self-determination that is taken for granted in the word "choice". In addition, they asserted that the mainstream women's rights movement did not center other pressing issues in the reproductive lives of women of color. These issues included sterilization abuse, forced and coerced promotion of LARCs (long-acting reversible contraceptives), high maternal mortality, difficulty accessing birth support choices, unsafe drinking water in family homes, police brutality, and parents being separated from children through racially biased immigration and incarceration practices.

Reproductive justice advocates say that the framework strives to center the needs and leadership of the most marginalized people, rather than the majority, and to focus on how multiple oppressions intersect in the lived experience of marginalized people. The creators of the reproductive justice framework rooted it in the international human rights framework, asserting that reproductive justice is an inalienable human right.

=== SisterSong’s forerunner ===
In 1992, six national women of color organizations came together seeking to increase their impact on the mainstream women's rights/pro-choice movement and on US policy: Asians and Pacific Islanders for Choice, National Black Women's Health Project, National Latina Health Organization, Latina Roundtable on Health and Reproductive Rights, National Coalition of 100 Black Women, and Native American Women's Health and Education Resource Center. Together, they formed Women of Color Coalition for Reproductive Health Rights (WOCCRHR).

Their first action was to encourage women of color to attend the 1992 March for Women's Lives organized by NOW (National Organization for Women), while also publicly critiquing NOW for their lack of inclusivity in planning the march. NOW's decision-making included only organizations able to make large financial contributions, which they claimed effectively excluded all organizations led by women of color, as these organizations generally lacked access to resources.

WOCCRHR's second action was to organize women of color to influence the United Nations International Conference on Population and Development in Cairo, Egypt, in 1994 – the same conference that helped inspire the women who created the reproductive justice framework. WOCCRHR worked with other women of color to form the US Women of Color Delegation Project for the conference, and wrote a "Statement on Poverty, Development, and Population Activities". which they presented there. It connected the status of women of color in the US with that of women in developing countries and brought international attention to the issues faced by US women of color.

WOCCRHR also helped women of color participate and influence the 1995 United Nations Fourth World Conference on Women in Beijing. Afterward, the coalition disbanded because their funding sources were focused on international work, and they were not able to find funding to continue their work within the US after the international conferences ended.

=== SisterSong’s founding and history ===
SisterSong was founded in 1997 by 16 women-of-color-led organizations representing African American, Asian American and Pacific Islander, Latinx, and Indigenous women, the same populations represented in WOCCRHR. They received funding from the Ford Foundation. The organization emerged from a series of symposia in New York City and Savannah in 1997-1998 convened by Reena Marcelo, then a Program Officer at the Ford Foundation's Reproductive Health Program, and Luz Rodriguez, then executive director of Latina Roundtable on Health and Reproductive Rights. The purpose of these gatherings was to convene women of color reproductive health educators, activists, and policymakers to identify the key challenges grassroots organizations of color were experiencing in reproductive health work. Attendees decided to use the opportunity of these convenings to form a national collective of independent organizations that would help them all to achieve greater impact, and SisterSong was born with Luz Rodriguez as its first leader. The original name of the collective was SisterSong Women of Color Reproductive Health Collective, and the original mission was to advocate for the reproductive and sexual health needs of women of color.

In its early history, SisterSong expanded to include other organizations led by women of color and to include individual women of color members. Organizational members focused on issues including HIV/AIDS services, midwifery, support for incarcerated women, health screenings, advocacy for abortion and contraception, research, teen pregnancy, drug and alcohol treatment, and treatment and prevention of sexually transmitted diseases. After several years of work to develop the collective, SisterSong hosted its first national conference in November 2003 at Spelman College in Atlanta with over 600 women of color in attendance.

SisterSong was a volunteer-run network until 2005, when they opened a national office in Atlanta and hired their first staff with funding from the Ford Foundation and the Moriah Fund. The first staff leader was Loretta Ross, who served as National Coordinator from 2005 to 2012. One of the women who created the reproductive justice framework, Ross came with a long history of starting new organizations and programs related to human rights, violence against women, and anti-hate work. Instead of a board of directors, SisterSong was led by a Management Circle of leaders from each ethnic community in the Collective: Indigenous, Black, Asian and Pacific Islander, and Latinx.

In 2006 SisterSong incorporated as a 501(c)(3) nonprofit. In 2007 the collective officially changed its name to SisterSong Women of Color Reproductive Justice Collective and purchased The Motherhouse in Atlanta, the historic first home of the National Black Women's Health Project, which remains the organization's headquarters today. SisterSong is strategically sited in the Deep South because they feel that this is where the rights of women of color are most threatened.

In 2012, National Coordinator Loretta Ross decided to return to her roots as a scholar and thought leader working within academia. With Ross's exit, SisterSong shifted from the Management Circle model to a conventional Board of Directors model and named Monica Raye Simpson, then the organization's Development Director, as Interim Executive Director in 2012 and executive director in 2013. Monica Simpson had previously been the first staff person of color at Charlotte's Lesbian & Gay Community Center and won awards for organizing the first Black Gay Pride in the Bible Belt. She remains SisterSong's Executive Director today.

In 2014, SisterSong selected four strategic priority areas:

1. Reproductive justice training to build the capacity of reproductive justice advocates and groups and to bring the framework into mainstream use
2. Centering black women's leadership and issues because SisterSong believes that black people are the most maligned in the US
3. Building Southern synergy to increase reproductive justice collaboration across the region, which SisterSong asserts is critical because the South has powerful opponents of reproductive freedom linking their agenda to Southern culture, while Southern reproductive justice advocates are under-resourced and stretched thin working across large geographical areas
4. Using arts and culture to reach new audiences and eradicate bigotry within US culture

In 2016, SisterSong opened a second office in North Carolina focused on building a state-based reproductive justice movement there.

== Projects ==
=== Movement building ===
As the first reproductive justice organization, SisterSong has inspired or mentored many of its successors. SisterSong was particularly involved in launching New Voices for Reproductive Justice in 2004, Milwaukee Reproductive Justice Coalition in 2008, and Black Mamas Matter Alliance in 2017.

=== Spreading the influence of reproductive justice ===
In 2005, SisterSong partnered with Asian Communities for Reproductive Justice and California Latinas for Reproductive Justice to host the first Funders’ Briefing on Reproductive Justice, specifically to explain the framework to foundations and persuade them to support movement organizations. Numerous foundations now have programs devoted to funding reproductive justice work. SisterSong has also influenced Planned Parenthood, the Unitarian Universalist Association of America, and the National Council of Jewish Women to engage in reproductive justice activism, and they have presented before the United Nations and state legislators and at the White House during the Obama administration. Their work in promoting reproductive justice has brought the concept to national politics: Hillary Clinton discussed reproductive during her presidential campaign in 2016, and Stacey Abrams mentioned it during her State of the Union Rebuttal in 2019.

=== National conferences ===
In 2003, SisterSong hosted the first national conference on reproductive justice organized by women of color at Spelman College in Atlanta with over 600 attendees. They hosted their first Let's Talk About Sex Conference in 2007 to talk openly about sex in relation to reproductive justice organizing. They repeated the Let's Talk About Sex Conference in 2011 and 2017. In 2014, they also launched the RJ Leadership Summit to convene the movement's leaders for insight sharing and movement-wide strategic planning.

=== Online organizing ===
From 2006 to 2012, SisterSong partnered with Ipas and the National Gay and Lesbian Task Force to create and maintain a website mapping the sexual and reproductive laws in every US state to provide a tool for activists. They continue to lead online organizing online.

=== Reproductive justice training ===
From 2004 to 2012, SisterSong published over a dozen issues of Collective Voices, the first reproductive justice news magazine. In 2006, they debuted RJ 101 training to introduce people to the reproductive justice framework. Since then, they have added many other reproductive justice trainings. Many organizations, such as The Center For Reproductive Health Education in Family Medicine, draw from them. In 2015, SisterSong relaunched Collective Voices as a free monthly webinar series with reproductive justice leaders talking about the intersections between reproductive justice and other topics.

=== Organizing in Washington, DC ===
In 2004, SisterSong influenced the March for Choice to expand its agenda and become the March for Women's Lives; it was the largest march in US history, with 1.2 million participants. Loretta Ross, who was to become SisterSong's leader the following year, co-directed the march. SisterSong also broadcast the perspectives of women of color at the march live on 115 radio stations in the Pacifica national network and produced Listen Up!, a documentary film following several women-of-color-led groups organizing the march.

In 2009, SisterSong organized over 300 women of color to visit 40 legislators’ offices on Capitol Hill to argue for abortion access and for immigrants’ healthcare access during healthcare debates. In 2010, they brought another large delegation from six Southern states to Washington DC to push for healthcare reform aimed to increase healthcare access for families of color.

=== Billboard campaign and Trust Black Women ===
In 2010, SisterSong created the Trust Black Women partnership to change how the United States views black women by elevating black women's voices to eliminate stereotypes. The partnership was triggered by anti-abortion billboards in Atlanta targeting black women and calling black children "an endangered species".

The billboard campaign was complemented by a documentary film, Maafa 21, which was distributed to black churches and organizations and claimed that Planned Parenthood founder Margaret Sanger was racist and that Planned Parenthood's agenda was genocide. The campaign culminated with an effort to pass a Georgia bill that would restrict abortions suspected of being motivated by the race or sex of the fetus. SisterSong disagreed with the accusation against Planned Parenthood and felt that the campaign was claiming that black women have a racial obligation to have babies, which overrides their personal desires and needs. SisterSong believed these efforts were seeking to divide black voters by gender and pro-choice voters by race, as well as to use anti-immigrant sentiments to bolster anti-abortion work by accusing Asian American women of aborting female fetuses due to son preference. SisterSong claimed that the bill would have led to racial profiling and intrusive interrogation of black and Asian American women seeking abortions, and that it would have violated patient confidentiality and made providers afraid to provide services because they could be criminalized.

SisterSong convened the Trust Black Women Partnership with nine black-women-led organizations to fight the billboards and abortion restriction bill, and the group defeated both. This effort led to the creation of the documentary An Abortion Conspiracy, produced by Stuart Productions and GritTV, which showcased Trust Black Women's work on the billboards, as well as other anti-abortion initiatives and efforts to challenge them. Another documentary, We Always Resist, was also created about Trust Black Women. In 2011, the organization Strong Families/Forward Together then worked with a coalition of multiracial groups to use SisterSong's billboard strategies to successfully take down anti-abortion billboards in Oakland, California.

Trust Black Women is still in operation as a national alliance of black-women-led organizations. They say that they use communications and events to combat stereotype, amplify black women's voices, organize with black women and allies for black women's rights, and connect black women with holistic care methods and resources. Still led by SisterSong, they also partner with the Movement for Black Lives to raise awareness of and address the intersectional oppressions black women face.

=== Southern RJ Network and Cohort ===
In 2010, SisterSong launched the Southern RJ Network because they felt that reproductive freedom was especially under attack in the South, making collaboration among reproductive justice groups particularly critical across the region. The Southern RJ Network then helped defeat a fetal personhood bill in Mississippi. It paused for SisterSong's leadership transition in 2012. In 2013, the Groundswell Fund formed the Southern RJ Cohort, and SisterSong became its leader. By 2017, the Southern RJ Cohort had 13 organizational members from nine Southern states and focused on the Southern RJ Policy Initiative, which aimed to stop policies threatening reproductive justice and advance policies that would move reproductive justice forward in the South.

=== Linking reproductive justice and Black Lives Matter ===
In 2014, SisterSong expanded common perceptions of what constitutes a reproductive justice issue by hosting the Standing Our Ground for Marissa Alexander Summit in Jacksonville, Florida. Florida's controversial Stand Your Ground law helped White-Hispanic man George Zimmerman win his freedom after shooting and killing black teenager Trayvon Martin after being violently attacked. Yet the Stand Your Ground law did not protect Marissa Alexander, a Black woman who fired a gun in the air to defend her family by scaring off an abusive partner. SisterSong published articles that called this as a reproductive justice issue, saying that Alexander was imprisoned and separated from her children as punishment for defending herself and them from an abuser. SisterSong and the Free Marissa Now Campaign hosted a two-day summit on racism within the criminal justice system, domestic violence, and Southern reproductive justice. They also hosted a benefit concert for Alexander and a march and rally with over 200 people at the Duval County Courthouse. By showing how racial bias in the criminal justice system impacts women, children, and families, this work linked reproductive justice with Black Lives Matter.

In 2015, Trust Black Women followed up on this connection by publishing a statement of solidarity with Black Lives Matter. It was announced in a media call with Black Lives Matter co-founder Alicia Garza, who talked about beginning her organizing career in the reproductive justice movement. Garza has continued to highlight the work of Trust Black Women and SisterSong, including a 2019 article about activism in the face of Georgia and Alabama's abortion bans.

=== Engaging Planned Parenthood in reproductive justice ===
In a July 2014 article, The New York Times interviewed Cecile Richards, the executive director of Planned Parenthood, talking about why the term "pro-choice" has been falling out of favor. The article did not mention that women of color have been leading the critique of this term since articulating reproductive justice in 1994. In response, SisterSong published an open letter to Planned Parenthood that was signed by 39 organizations and 24 individuals and asked Richards to correct the article and publicly recognize the leadership of women of color. Richards complied immediately. She also invited SisterSong to bring a group of reproductive justice leaders to discuss how Planned Parenthood could do more to support reproductive justice organizations. This led to Planned Parenthood providing funding for reproductive justice groups, honoring leaders of color in their annual 99 Dreamkeepers, engaging SisterSong to train them in reproductive justice and advise their strategic planning, and hosting their first reproductive justice conference in 2016.

=== Black Mamas Matter ===
In 2014, SisterSong partnered with the Center for Reproductive Rights and National Latina Institute for Reproductive Health on a study about the high maternal mortality rates among Southern women of color, especially Black women. They wrote a shadow report that SisterSong presented to the United Nations Committee on the Elimination of Racial Discrimination, which adopted all of the report's recommendations. SisterSong then spoke about the issue at the 2015 Women in the World Summit.

Afterward, SisterSong and the Center for Reproductive Rights founded the Black Mamas Matter Alliance, a collaboration of 24 Black-women-led organizations who work to raise awareness about the rising black maternal mortality rate. They created the Black Mamas Matter Toolkit, an online resource for groups interested in working to reduce Black maternal mortality. Black Mamas Matter grew to nearly 40 organizational members, and in 2017 became the Black Mamas Matter Alliance, an independent nonprofit fiscally sponsored by SisterSong.

=== Artists United ===
In 2016, SisterSong launched the Artists United for RJ program to facilitate artists of color to create collaborative, replicable artwork to advance reproductive justice. Projects have included concerts that raise funds and/or awareness for reproductive justice issues and Autonomy, a play designed to travel to college campuses and introduce Black students to reproductive justice.

=== SisterSong North Carolina ===
In 2016, SisterSong opened a second office in North Carolina, where there were previously no reproductive justice organizations. In February 2018, SisterSong began advocating for a review of a North Carolina Department of Public Safety policies that allows for pregnant inmates to be shackled to a hospital bed while in labor. The department later revised their policy to clearly define when wrist restraints must be removed.

=== Georgia abortion ban ===
In 2019, SisterSong acted as the lead plaintiff in a lawsuit against Georgia legislators for passing a six-week abortion ban, which bans abortion before most women even know they are pregnant. Reproductive justice advocates say that the ban is unconstitutional, and that its proponents passed it to force a court case that could reach the Supreme Court. After the 2019 confirmation of Supreme Court Justice Brett Kavanaugh, they believe that the balance of the Supreme Court became tilted against abortion rights, so bringing the abortion ban case to the Supreme Court could give it a chance to overturn Roe v. Wade, the 1972 decision that protects the legal right to abortion throughout the US.

=== Other collaborations ===
SisterSong is also involved in the Over the Counter Contraception Working Group and the All* Above All Campaign to repeal the Hyde Amendment, which prohibits federal funding from supporting abortion services, which means that women on public healthcare, federal employees, and others cannot receive healthcare coverage for abortions.

In 2018, SisterSong co-founded the Southeast Alliance for Reproductive Equity (SEARE) with SPARK Reproductive Justice Now, Healthy and Free TN, and Women's Rights Empowerment Network (WREN). This alliance uses the Collective Impact model to foster collaboration among reproductive justice, reproductive rights, and reproductive health groups throughout the South.

Also in 2018, SisterSong co-founded a collaboration to combat religious exemption laws with Atlanta Jobs with Justice, Women Engaged, and Georgia Equality. This is a cross-movement collaboration of reproductive justice, economic justice, and LGBTQ rights groups.
