= Monica Simpson =

American activist

- Citizenship: American
- Education: Johnson C. Smith University
- Occupations: Director, artist, activist
- Known for: Reproductive justice
- Awards: 100 Women (BBC) (2022)

Monica Raye Simpson is a queer Black activist, artist, and executive director of SisterSong Women of Color Reproductive Justice Collective, the United States' largest organization dedicated to reproductive justice for women of color.

== Early life and education ==
Monica Raye Simpson grew up in Wingate, North Carolina. She was often the only black child in spaces such as honors classes, which she says started her on the path to activism for the rights of black people and women.

Simpson received a bachelor's degree in communications at Johnson C. Smith University, a Historically Black University (HBCU) where she organized for LGBTQ rights both on and off campus. After graduation, she became the operations director and the first person of color at the Charlotte Lesbian & Gay Community Center. Simpson was a co-founder of the Charlotte's Black Gay Pride Celebration, for which she received awards from the National Black Justice Coalition and the Human Rights Coalition.

== Career ==
Simpson moved to Atlanta, Georgia in 2010 to become the development coordinator for SisterSong Women of Color Reproductive Justice Collective, the national, multi-ethnic organization that first launched the reproductive justice movement for women of color in the United States. She rose to deputy coordinator in 2011, interim executive director in 2012, and executive director in 2013.

In 2014, Simpson testified in Geneva before the United Nations Committee on the Elimination of Racial Discrimination, presenting a shadow report created jointly by SisterSong, the Center for Reproductive Rights (CRR), and the National Latina Institute for Reproductive Health. The report stated that the United States, by failing to address its crisis in black maternal mortality, was violating an international human rights treaty. The committee adopted all of the report's recommendations and called on the United States to “eliminate racial disparities in the field of sexual and reproductive health and standardize the data-collection system on maternal and infant deaths in all states to effectively identify and address the causes of disparities in maternal- and infant-mortality rates.” After producing the shadow report, SisterSong and CRR co-founded Black Mamas Matter to address black maternal mortality. In 2016, it became independent as the Black Mamas Matter Alliance, and Simpson continued to serve as a Steering Committee Member and then on the advisory board.

In 2014, Simpson created Artists United for Reproductive Justice, the first program facilitating artists of color to create artwork designed to help shift US culture toward reproductive justice.

In 2016, Simpson was one of the first two reproductive justice leaders to speak before the Democratic National Convention Platform Drafting Committee, which then included repealing the Hyde Amendment on the Platform for the first time.

=== Awards ===
In 2014, Simpson was named one of the New Civil Rights Leaders by Essence Magazine. In 2015 she was honored by Woodhull Freedom Foundation with the Vicki Sexual Freedom Award for her work advancing and protecting our fundamental human right to sexual freedom. In the same year she was honored by Hands Up United as one of 14 African-American women who advanced the fight for civil rights and gender equality and one of Planned Parenthood Federation of America's 99 Dream Keepers. In 2016, she was named among the top 40 leaders under 40 by The Advocate magazine. In 2018, she received the Ms. Foundation Gloria Award and was recognized again as a Planned Parenthood Dream Keeper. She was honored as one of the BBC 100 Women in December 2022.

=== Artist ===
Simpson has also been a singer from a young age, after growing up singing gospel at church like her mother and grandmother. She has appeared in theatrical productions such as For the Love of Harlem, Words the Isms, Walk Like a Man, The Vagina Monologues, and For Colored Girls. In 2015, she released her first album, Revolutionary Love: The Live Recording. She has also performed at events across the country, including singing the National Anthem and the National Black Anthem for the annual Dr. Martin Luther King Jr. march and rally in Atlanta, Georgia.
