= GSLI =

GSLI can refer to:

- Gloria Steinem Leadership Institute (GSLI), a training program of Choice USA, a pro-choice organization.
- Grammatical specific language impairment (G-SLI), a language disability, a form of Specific language impairment.
