= Byllye Avery =

American activist

- Born: October 20, 1937 (age 88); Waynesville, Georgia, U.S.
- Education: University of Florida; Talladega College
- Known for: National Black Women's Health Project

Byllye Yvonne Avery (born October 20, 1937) is an American health care activist. A proponent of reproductive justice, Avery has worked to develop healthcare services and education that address black women's mental and physical health stressors. She is best known as the founder of the National Black Women's Health Project, the first national organization to specialize in Black women's reproductive health issues. For her work with the NBWHP, she has received the MacArthur Foundation's Fellowship for Social Contribution and the Gustav O. Lienhard Award for the Advancement of Health Care from the Institute of Medicine of the National Academy of Sciences, among other awards.

== Family and education ==
Avery was born in Waynesville, Georgia and grew up on a farm in DeLand, Florida. She is the daughter of L. Alyce M. Ingram, a schoolteacher. Her mother graduated of Bethune-Cookman College. Her father, Quitman Reddick, owned a neighborhood store. He was killed when Avery was 14 years old. The oldest of three children, Avery assumed a lot of responsibility from a young age.

Avery attended college at Talladega College and earned her BA in psychology in 1959. She met her husband, Wesley Avery, while at Talladega College and they married in 1960. Byllye and Wesley Avery had two children Wesley and Sonia born in 1961 and 1966, 5 years apart.

In 1967, Avery received a fellowship to obtain her master's in special education at the University of Florida, Gainesville. Upon earning her M.Ed. in 1969, she became a special education teacher. In 1970, only a few months after starting her new position, her husband suffered a fatal heart attack. He was only thirty-three years old and it was discovered after his death that he had very high blood pressure. At the time she was also pregnant with their third child. The death of her husband helped catalyze Avery's commitment to improving health care and health education in the Black community.

Avery met her wife, Ngina Lythcott, in 1989, and the two were married in 2005. Lythcott is a public health practitioner and activist.

== Activism ==
In the early 1970s Avery began participating in consciousness-raising groups and legal abortion referral services. In response to the lack of access to abortion and other reproductive health needs that low-income Black women faced in her community, Avery and her colleagues Joan Edelson, Judy Levy, and Margaret Parrish opened the Gainesville Women's Health Center (GWHC) in 1974. It was the first abortion and gynecological care clinic in the city. They opened these facilities after a petition to open a Planned Parenthood clinic in Gainesville was denied. The GWHC mission statement was to "help women solve the crisis-producing situation of unplanned, unwanted pregnancy", at a low cost. The clinic provided abortions and contraceptive services, facilitated sexuality workshops, and provided other women's health-related training and services tailored to Black women, such as sickle cell anemia testing. To help educate women on best health services, the staff created a monthly newsletter called Sage-Femme.

In 1978, Avery helped to found Birthplace, an alternative birthing center in Gainesville. Certified nurse-midwives assisted women with deliveries and Avery personally assisted in the birth of one hundred patients before her departure.

In 1981, while serving on the board of directors for National Women's Health Network, Avery started a two-year long project called the Black Women's Health Project. As part of this project, Avery planned The Conference of Black Women's Health Issues which was held at Spelman College in June 1983. Two thousand women attended the three-day event. Topics included domestic violence, diabetes, sexual abuse, obesity, sexuality, childbirth, mental health as well as holistic wellness. It encouraged attendees to take charge of their health through consciousness-raising, community organizing around health issues, and self-examination. Following the conference, Avery founded National Black Women's Health Project, now known as the Black Women's Health Imperative, officially in 1984 in Atlanta, Georgia. It is the only national organization exclusively dedicated to improving health and wellness among Black women. NBWHP opened an advocacy and policy office in Washington, D.C., in 1991. By 1991, the NBWHP had chapters in twenty-five states and had expanded its reach to work with women in Belize, Jamaica, South Africa, Nigeria, and Brazil.

Recalling the negative attitudes she was taught about sex as a child, Avery taught her daughters to celebrate their bodies and menstruation. When her first daughter turned eleven, Avery gave her a cake that read "Happy Birthday, Happy Menstruation!" Soon after, she gave a workshop on menstruation and childbearing at her daughter's elementary school that she developed into a film On Becoming a Woman: Mothers and Daughters Talking to Each Other (1987), the first documentary film by African-American women sharing their perspectives on menstruation, sex, and love.

Along with prominent African-American leaders such as Shirley Chisholm, Maxine Waters, Dorothy Height, and Faye Wattleton, issued and signed a public statement, "We Remember: African American Women for Reproductive Freedom", in 1989. The statement supports reproductive freedom (including the right to have children, the right to access to contraceptive services and reproductive health information, and the right to health care as well as safe and legal abortions.) The statement connected racism, poverty, and violence to negative reproductive health outcomes for African American women. The statement was reprinted repeatedly and eventually circulated over 250,000 copies. The statement can still be found in many anthologies on women's rights and activism. Avery was awarded a MacArthur Fellowship this same year in the area of health policy.

In 1990, Avery, along with fifteen other African-American women and men, formed the African-American Women for Reproductive Freedom. The organization was created to end the stigma against abortions in the Black community and to make abortions more accessible for Black women.

Avery has written and lectured widely on how race, class and sex impact women's healthcare. She has called the health discrepancies between African-American and white women a "conspiracy of silence". She has been a visiting fellow at the Harvard University School of Public Health; she has served on the Charter Advisory Committee for the Office of Research on Women's Health of the National Institutes of Health; she has been a health issues advisor for the Kellogg Foundation's International Leadership Program; and she has served as a consultant on women's healthcare in Latin America, the Caribbean and Africa.

== Awards and recognition ==
- 1989: MacArthur Foundation's Fellowship for Social Contribution
- 1989: Essence Award for Community Service
- 1994: Academy of Science Institute of Medicine's Gustav O. Lienhard Award for the Advancement of Health Care
- 1994: Grassroots Realist Award by the Georgia Legislative Black Caucus
- 1995: Dorothy I. Height Lifetime Achievement Award
- 1995: President's Citation of the American Public Health Association
- 1998: Business and Professional Women's New Horizons Award
- 2008: Ruth Bader Ginsburg Impact Award from the Chicago Foundation for Women
- 2010: Audre Lorde Spirit of Fire Award from the Fenway Health Center

== Selected bibliography ==
- Avery, Byllye (Fall 1991). "Empowerment through wellness". Yale Journal of Law and Feminism. 4 (1). Yale Law School: 147–154. Pdf.
- Avery, Byllye Y. "Breathing life into ourselves." Feminism and Community (1995): 147.
- Avery, B. (1999). An Altar of Words: Wisdom, Comfort and Inspiration. New York: Broadway. ISBN 978-0615332383
- Avery, Byllye. "Who does the work of public health?." American journal of public health 92.4 (2002): 570–575.
- "Byllye Avery." The New York Historical, 2026.
