= Flora Rodríguez Russel =

American social worker and attorney (1932–2023)

- Born: November 1, 1932; Española, New Mexico, US
- Died: January 2, 2023 (aged 90–91); Denver, Colorado, US
- Education: Metropolitan State College of Denver, University of Denver
- Occupations: Social worker and attorney
- Spouse: Robert "Dan" Russel

Flora Rodríguez Russel (1932 – January 2, 2023) was a social worker and attorney in Denver, Colorado. She championed reproductive justice and children's rights.

== Biography ==
Flora Rodríguez Russel was born in Española, New Mexico.

Rodríguez Russel and her husband lived in Santa Fe and then Albuquerque. The couple moved to Denver in the early 1960s.

She pursued higher education after her eighth child. She graduated from Metropolitan State College of Denver with a degree in Behavioral Sciences. She earned a Master's of Social Work from the University of Denver and completed coursework in Social Work Administration. She earned her Juris Doctor from University of Denver Law School.

During her higher education, Rodríguez Russel felt alone since there were few other women in her class at law school. Her management position at Denver Health was also the only woman surrounded by men.

=== Career ===
Rodríguez Russel worked for the Denver Health hospital system for over 25 years. She was a psychiatric social worker, health administrator, Director of Consultation and Education, and Director of Risk Management and Legal Affairs. She had a law practice that represented youth in foster care.

Rodríguez Russel was involved in many community and national organizations. She was a founder of the National Institute for Reproductive Justice in 1994 and the Colorado Organization for Latina Opportunity and Reproductive Rights (COLOR) in 1998. Rodriguez Russel, Charlene Barrientos Ortiz and Melanie Herrera Bortz met in 1996 at an event from the National Latina Institute for Reproductive Health (NLIRH) and started the plans for what would become COLOR. The original three women and Maria Corral, Elicia Gonzalez, Jacy Montoya Price, Gloria Sanchez and Martha Spano received a grant from the Latinas Unidas State Coalition Project for the National Institute for Reproductive Health to start COLOR, which was the first Latina-led and Latina-serving reproductive justice organization in Colorado. COLOR was incorporated and received nonprofit status in 2000.

She was also a volunteer for or sat on the board of the following organizations:

- National Latina Institute for Reproductive Health
- Catholics for a Free Choice
- Colorado Organization for Latina Opportunity and Reproductive Rights (COLOR)
- Rocky Mountain PBS
- Friends Foundation of the Denver Public Library

Rodríguez Russel ran for State Legislature and City Council.

=== Personal life ===
Flora Rodríguez met Robert Daniel "Dan" Russel in Española, New Mexico where she grew up. The couple had eight children together.

She believed that women should not be full-time homemakers, but need to establish their own identities outside of motherhood or being a wife. She did not identify as a feminist and disagreed with the concept of women's oppression.

=== Death and legacy ===
Flora Rodríguez Russel died on January 2, 2023, in Denver, Colorado.

== Recognition ==
- Cesar Chavez Leadership Hall of Fame, from Denver Public Library (2007)
- Latina Legacy Circle (2017)
