= COLOR Latina =

Reproductive justice organization in Colorado

- Colorado Organization for Latina Opportunity and Reproductive Rights
- Abbreviation: COLOR Latina
- Formation: 2000
- Founders: Flora Rodríguez Russel, Charlene Barrientos Ortiz, Melanie Herrera Bortz, Maria Corral, Jacinta Montoya Price, Gloria Sanchez, Darci Martinez
- Founded at: Denver, Colorado
- Type: Nonprofit organization
- Legal status: 501(c)(3)
- Purpose: Reproductive justice
- Region served: Colorado
- Official language: Spanish and English
- President and CEO: Dusti Gurule
- Website: www.colorlatina.org

COLOR Latina (Colorado Organization for Latina Opportunity and Reproductive Rights) is a reproductive justice organization in Colorado.

== History ==
Flora Rodriguez Russel, Charlene Barrientos Ortiz and Melanie Herrera Bortz met in 1996 at an event from the National Latina Institute for Reproductive Health (NLIRH) and started the plans for what would become COLOR. Herrera Bortz worked at the Latin American Research and Service Organization, and Ortiz and Rodríguez Russel worked at the Denver Department of Public Health and Hospitals.

The NLIRH-Colorado Caucus received $5000 in seed money from NLIRH, and Herrera Bortz led the establishment of the state coalition. The group received financial sponsorship from Planned Parenthood of the Rocky Mountains, and a total of $12,000 from NLIRH.

In December 1999, the group separated from its fiscal sponsors and became the independent organization COLOR. The original three women and Maria Corral, Elicia Gonzalez, Jacinta Montoya Price, Gloria Sanchez and Martha Spano received a grant from the Latinas Unidas State Coalition Project for the National Institute for Reproductive Health, and was the first Latina-led and Latina-serving reproductive justice organization in Colorado. COLOR was incorporated and received nonprofit status in 2000.

The organization has received support from the Ford Foundation, The National Institute of Reproductive Health, and the Chinook Fund.

== Philosophy ==
The organization has an all-Latina board of directors, and control remains in the hands of the people in the community.

The organization approaches advocacy with razalogía, "knowledge of and for the people." They value communal knowledge attainment and community healing.
