= African-American Women for Reproductive Freedom =

African-American Women for Reproductive Freedom was an American-based reproductive rights organization that formed in 1990. The organization developed as a way for African American women to show support for "Jane Roe" (Norma Leah Nelson McCorvey) in Roe v. Wade. Faye Wattleton was one of the first major supporters of the organization.

This group's intent was to alter the perception of abortion not being a choice for African-American women, who they argued faced additional stigma and judgement for seeking out a legal abortion. Their arguments mentioned the history of rape, torture, and other forms of abuse suffered by African-American women, stating that it was not fair and that this led to them being continually marginalized and treated as if they couldn't think for themselves.

== Declaration brochure ==
In 1989, before officially forming an organization, a group of 16 African American women, and one man, all affiliated with major organizations in the country, released a declaration brochure supporting pro-choice reproductive rights. The document, "African American Women are for Reproductive Freedom", was signed by:

- Byllye Avery
- Willie Barrow
- Donna Brazile
- Shirley Chisholm
- Cardiss Collins
- Ramona Edelin
- Jacqui Gates
- Marcia Ann Gillespie
- Dorothy Height
- Jewel Jackson McCabe
- Julianne Malveaux
- Eleanor Holmes Norton
- C. Delores Tucker
- Patricia Tyson
- Maxine Waters
- Faye Wattleton

== See also ==
- Abortion in the United States
