= March for Women's Lives (2004) =

Mass demonstration for women's rights in Washington, D.C.

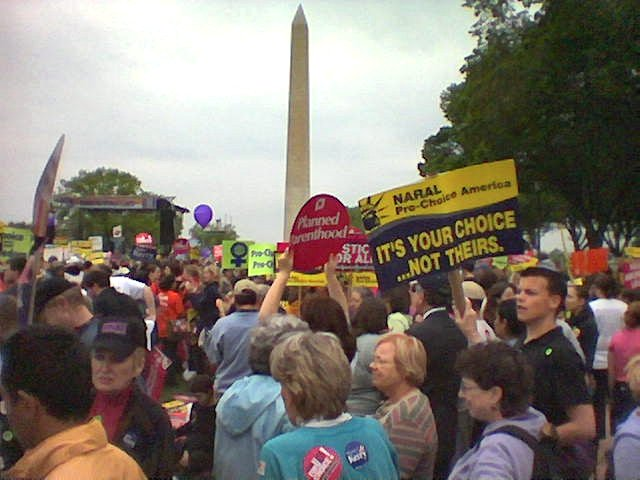
Marchers on the National Mall

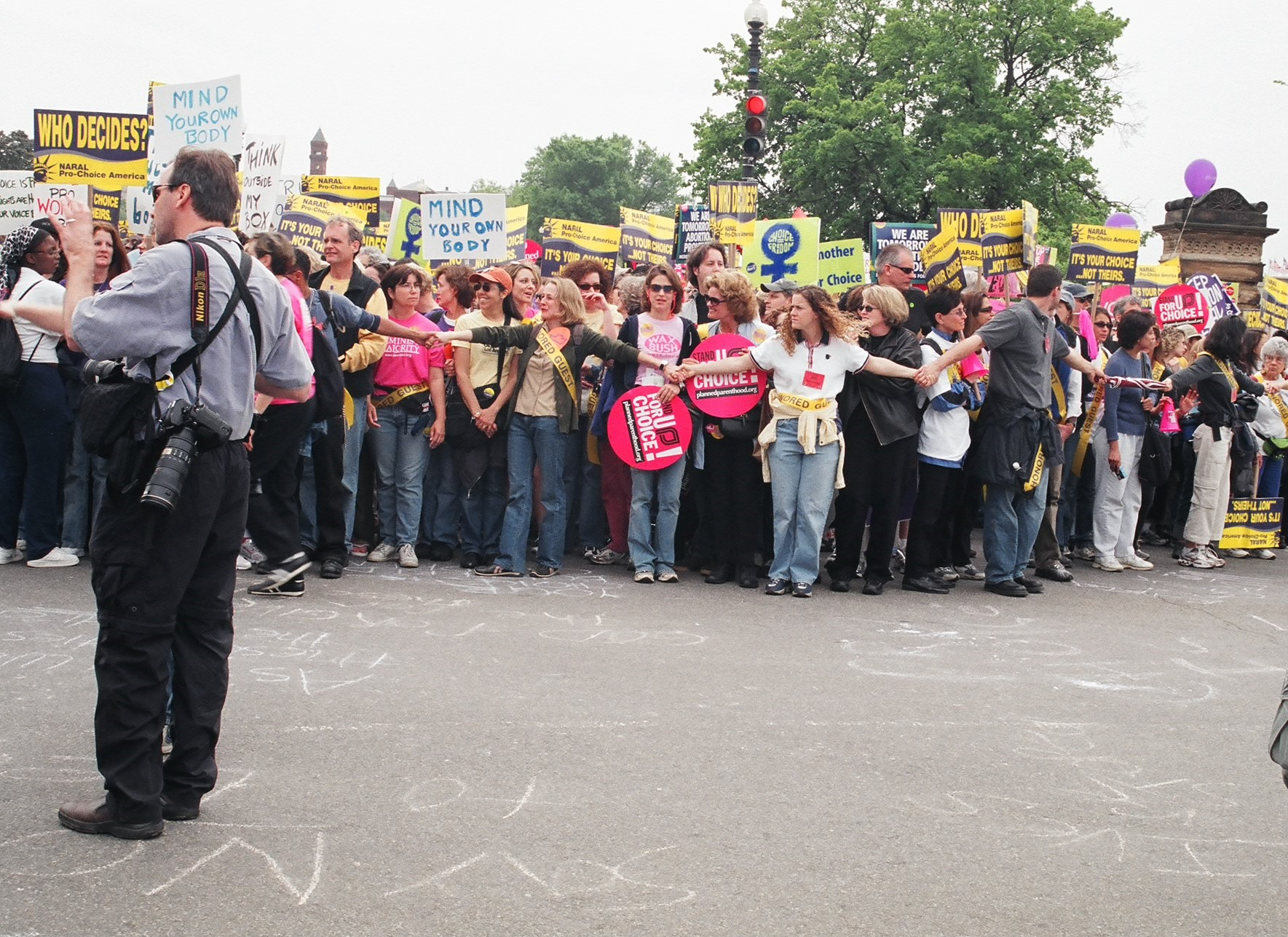
Demonstrators at the march

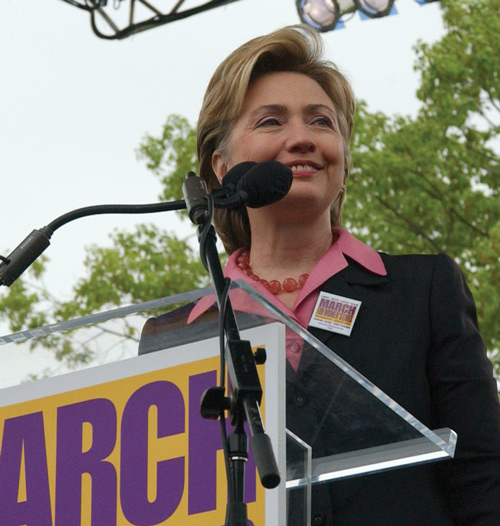
Hillary Clinton at the march

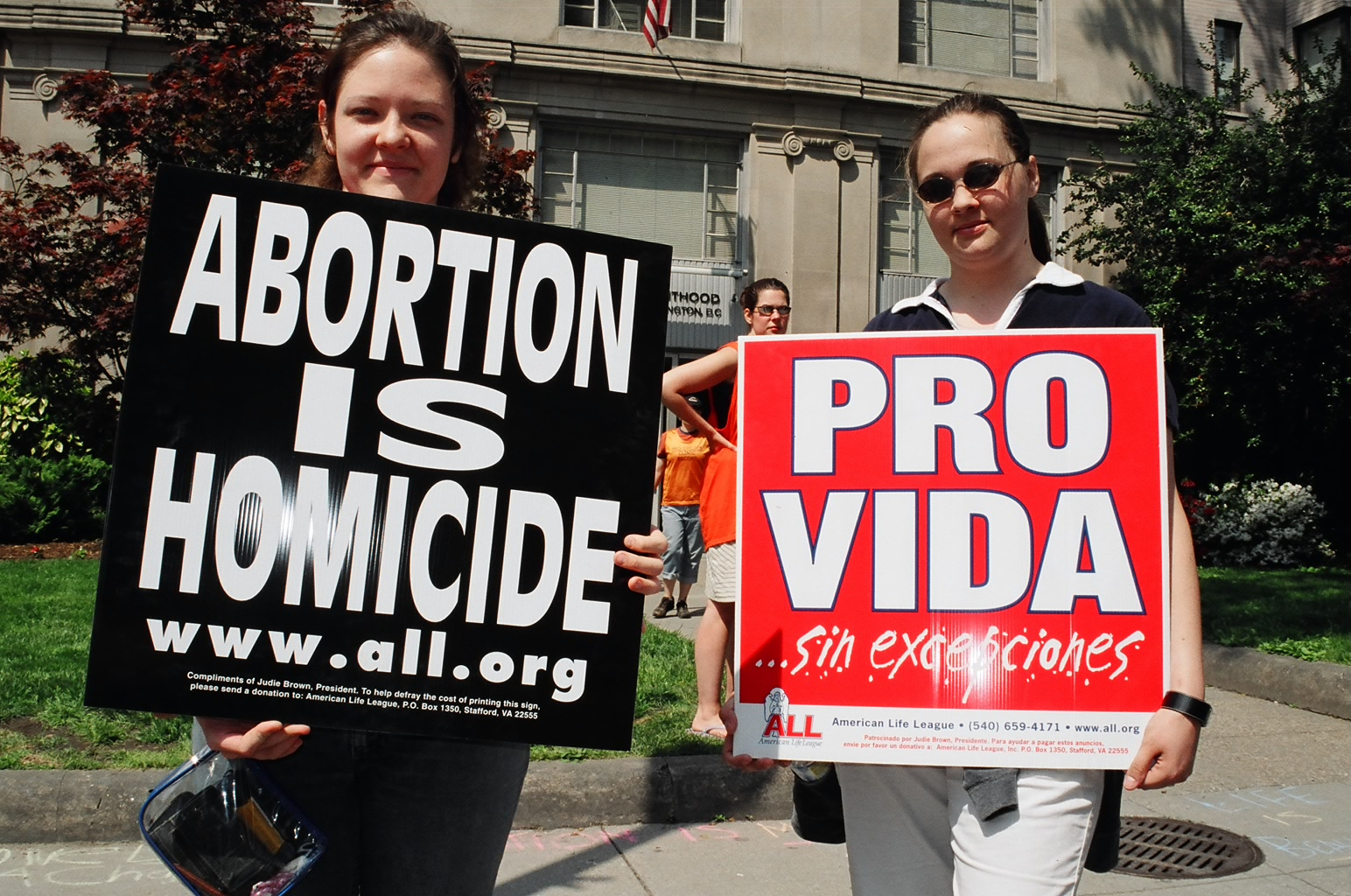
Counter-protestors outside a Planned Parenthood clinic

The March for Women's Lives was a protest demonstration held on April 25, 2004 at the National Mall in Washington, D. C. There was approximately 1.3 million participants. The demonstration was led by seven groups; National Organization for Women, American Civil Liberties Union, Black Women’s Health Imperative, Feminist Majority, NARAL Pro Choice America, National Latina Institute for Reproductive Health, and Planned Parenthood Federation of America. The march was intended to address topics such as abortion rights, reproductive health care, women's rights, and others. Originally named the March for Freedom, the march was renamed in an effort to expand the message of "pro-choice" to include the right to have children, access to pre and post natal care, as well as sex education that were not always accessible for women of color.

The Women's March was notable for its inclusivity and diversity, with participants from all walks of life, ages, races, genders, and sexual orientations coming together to advocate for progressive causes. The event featured speeches and performances by a range of prominent figures, including celebrities, politicians, and activists.

While the Women's March was criticized by some for its lack of a clear agenda or policy platform, its organizers argued that its primary goal was to show support for the rights and dignity of all people, regardless of their background or identity. The march was seen as a powerful symbol of resistance and unity in the face of what many saw as a threat to progress and equality.

== Events and participants ==
A rally on the Mall began at 10 a.m., and was followed by a march through downtown Washington, with a route along Pennsylvania Avenue. Celebrities who appeared at the march included Peter, Paul, and Mary, Indigo Girls, Judy Gorman, Susan Sarandon, Whoopi Goldberg, Ashley Judd, Kathleen Turner, Ted Turner, Ana Gasteyer, Janeane Garofalo, Bonnie Franklin, Julianne Moore, and former Secretary of State Madeleine Albright; also appearing were veteran abortion rights leaders, such as Kate Michelman of NARAL Pro-Choice America and Gloria Steinem, and many members of Congress.

The march was led by seven organizing groups: National Organization for Women (NOW), American Civil Liberties Union, Black Women's Health Imperative, Feminist Majority Foundation, NARAL Pro Choice America, National Latina Institute for Reproductive Health, and Planned Parenthood Federation of America. More than 1,400 organizations co- sponsored the event including Choice USA, the National Association for the Advancement of Colored People, Code Pink, and the National association of Social Workers. Two other groups that assisted in organizing women of color included the National Network of Abortion Funds and Sister Song .

Sixteen protesters from the Christian Defense Coalition were arrested for demonstrating without a permit when they crossed police barricades into the area designated for the March.

== See also ==
- List of protest marches on Washington, D.C.
