= Unite for Reproductive & Gender Equity =

Unite for Reproductive & Gender Equity (URGE) is a national youth-led reproductive rights and justice non-profit organization in the United States based in Washington, D.C. that began as Choice USA in 1992. Choice USA changed its name to URGE in July 2014.

== History and organization ==
URGE was founded in 1992 by activists Gloria Steinem, Julie Burton, and Kristina Kiehl. The organization's first projects analyzed the activities of the religious right in elections and promoted electoral participation by women, young people, and people of color.

URGE provides multiple ways for young people and students to get involved in their organization, including internships. The Reproductive Justice Leadership Institute (RJLI) is provided by URGE for students and young adults to become fully educated on the matters of activism. Through the training classes provided, students are able to ask questions and connect to the causes that they are passionate about. There are also URGE chapters on college campuses that allow students to be activists on their own campus. URGE currently has five chapters on college campuses throughout the state of Alabama. These campuses include: The University of Alabama, The University of Montevallo, Alabama State University, Troy University, and The University of Alabama at Birmingham.

In recent years, the organization has focused its efforts on mobilizing people under 30, on and off college campuses, in support of abortion rights, comprehensive sex education, and access to sexual health and wellness services. Specifically, URGE has partnered with other organizations including with All* Above All to "proclaim abortion access as a public good" and overturn the Hyde Amendment, which excludes abortions from covered Medicaid services All* Above All's mission is to remove the bans that keep people from receiving coverage for their abortion care. They have multiple partner organizations that help them educate policymakers on the negative effects that the Hyde Amendment has not only on women in general, but specifically on women of color.

== Activism ==
In 2004, URGE led the March for Women's Lives youth contingent, one of the biggest demonstrations in U.S. history.

In 2005, URGE focused on defeating California Proposition 73, which would have amended the California Constitution to ban performance of abortions on minors until 48 hours after the minor's parent or guardian was notified by a physician.

In 2006, URGE and the Latina Institute for Reproductive Health hosted the Young Women's Collaborative training, the first training for what would later become the Southwest Partnership, in Tucson, Arizona. The Latina Institute for Reproductive Health partners with multiple reproductive health organizations, including All* Above All, which is a mutual partnership with URGE. The Latina Institute for Reproductive Health focuses on the rights of Latinas and immigrants.

In 2009, GenderPAC wound down operations and transferred its GenderYOUTH network and resources to Choice USA.

In 2013, the "Bro-Choice" project was launched to involve men in the reproductive justice and anti-sexual assault movement.

In 2015, to educate and organize young people, URGE launched an integrated voters engagement program.

URGE was a co-sponsor of the 2017 Women's March.

In 2020, URGE brought justCARE into the organization, giving themselves a better opportunity to help more students across America. JustCARE stands for Campus Action for Reproductive Equity and its mission is to make the abortion pill more easily accessible at student health centers in public universities. In 2019, before joining URGE, justCARE partnered with local legal teams to help pass California's Senate Bill 24 (SB 24). This bill made sure that all student health centers at public universities in California needed to provide the abortion pill for their students. After partnering with URGE, justCARE has access to make changes at more universities all over the United States.

== See also ==
- Reproductive rights
- Reproductive health
- Reproductive justice
