= National Latina Institute for Reproductive Justice =

Reproductive justice organization in the United States

The National Latina Institute for Reproductive Justice (Latina Institute) is a reproductive justice organization representing the Latina community living in the United States. Previously the National Latina Institute for Reproductive Health, the organization started as The Latina Initiative, which was created in direct response to the lack of Latina visibility on reproductive health and rights issues. Its mission is to ensure the fundamental human right to reproductive health for Latinas, their families and their communities through education, advocacy and coalition building.

== Founding ==
Latina Institute commenced operations as an independent organization in 1994. Its antecedent, the Latina Initiative, emerged five years earlier under the auspices of Catholics for a Free Choice. During its time as an outreach group, the focus of the Initiative was limited to advancing pro-choice efforts in the Latinx community and assisting Hispanic organizations interested in reproductive health and rights issues. After a successful five year track record at Catholics for Free Choice, the Latina Initiative was renamed National Latina Institute for Reproductive Health and opened its doors as the first independent national organization and voice for Latinas on reproductive health, rights, and justice issues. In 2003 NLIRH re-opened its doors in New York City.

== Contributions ==
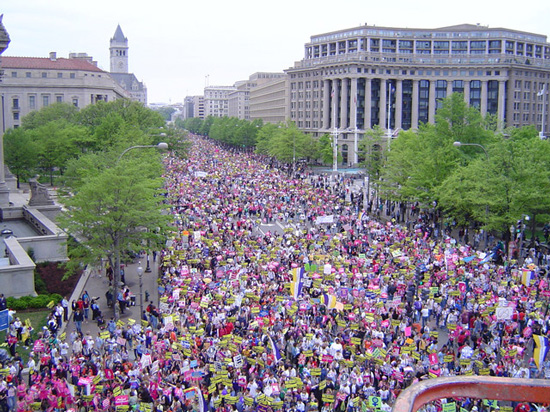
March for Women's Lives, 2004

In 2004, Latina Institute was a principal organizer of the March for Women's Lives.

In 2005, responding to the lack of research on the Latina community living in the United States, the Latina Institute (then known as the National Latina Institute for Reproductive Health) released its National Latina Agenda for Reproductive Justice. The agenda summarized the way forward by noting the state of reproductive health, access and justice thus:

By all measurable standards, Latinas are faring far worse than other groups in numerous areas of reproductive health, including breast and cervical cancer, HIV/AIDS, sexually transmitted infections and teen pregnancy. For example, the rate of cervical cancer among Latinas is twice the rate of white women, the rate of HIV infection for Latinas is seven times higher than white women, and Latinas have the highest teen birth rate of any racial/ethnic group. A number of factors contribute to Latinas‘ reproductive health problems, such as lack of health insurance, language barriers, institutional challenges in the public health care system, and poverty.

The Latina Institute is the only national Latina health and reproductive rights organization representing an increasingly diverse and growing Latina population. Within a reproductive justice framework, Latina Institute promotes programs that advocate for LGBTQ liberation. Its headquarters is located in New York City with their policy office in Washington D.C.
