= Reproductive justice =

Social justice movement

Reproductive justice is a framework, developed by Black women activists in the U.S. in 1994, that combines reproductive rights with social justice. It includes advocating for women to have the right to have a child, the right not to have a child, the right to parent children in safe and healthy environments, and the right to personal bodily autonomy. Rather than treating reproduction mainly as a legal question about abortion, this framework takes a comprehensive approach by considering the economic, social, and health conditions that shape people’s reproductive decisions.

The term was coined at a Chicago conference by a group calling itself Women of African Descent for Reproductive Justice. In 1997, 16 organizations led by Native American, Latin American, African American, and Asian American women founded a group called SisterSong Women of Color Reproductive Justice Collective to build a national movement, and other organizations began to adopt the framework in the early 2000s.

The framework gained popularity because many low-income women, women of color, women with disabilities, and LGBT people felt the mainstream reproductive rights movement focused narrowly on the legal right to abortion and on the concerns of white women. Advocates argue that a legal right means little to people who cannot afford care or reach a provider. They instead look at how race, class, immigration status, gender identity, and disability affect people's control over reproduction. Issues within its scope also include contraception, sex education, maternal health care, safe housing, and adequate wages. The framework is meant to draw on international human rights frameworks.

== Founders ==
The term reproductive justice combines reproductive rights and social justice. It was coined and formulated as an organizing framework by a group of Black women who came together for that purpose in 1994 and called themselves Women of African Descent for Reproductive Justice. They gathered in Chicago for a conference sponsored by the Illinois Pro-Choice Alliance and the Ms. Foundation for Women with the intention of creating a statement in response the Clinton administration's proposed plan for universal health care. The conference was intentionally planned just before the attendees would be going to the International Conference on Population and Development in Cairo, which reached the decision that the individual right to plan one's own family must be central to global development. The women developed the term as a combination of reproductive rights and social justice, and dubbed themselves Women of African Descent for Reproductive Justice. They launched the framework by publishing full-page statement titled "Black Women on Universal Health Care Reform" with 800+ signatures in The Washington Post and Roll Call addressing reproductive justice in a criticism of the Clinton health care plan. The women who created the reproductive justice framework were: Toni M. Bond Leonard, Reverend Alma Crawford, Evelyn S. Field, Terri James, Bisola Marignay, Cassandra McConnell, Cynthia Newbille, Loretta Ross, Elizabeth Terry, 'Able' Mable Thomas, Winnette P. Willis, and Kim Youngblood.

== Key features and concepts ==
=== Going beyond individual "choice" and "rights" ===
The framework was created as a response to the limitations of the dominant reproductive rights framework used around reproductive issues globally in policy, program and research. Activists of color criticized the focus on ‘choice’, for example the slogan ‘my body my choice’, and argued it did not consider the structural factors of reproductive issues such as income, race and immigration status, assuming all women would have the same ability to make reproductive choices .

Advocates argue that using the word ‘justice’ deliberately takes away focus from ‘choice’, ‘rights’ and health. Professor of law at Georgetown Robin West has argued that abortion should not be seen as a ‘rights’ as this gives huge power to the courts and especially the Supreme Court. Using the term health also gives power to doctors and clinics. However, using the term ‘justice’ aims to give power back to the communities involved.

Reproductive justice advocates often use storytelling to centre reproductive issues on the experiences of women of color. They utilize lived experience and consider those with lived experience as experts in their situations. This can help put abstract policy into perspective .

The framework goes against the ‘right to privacy’ of abortion created by Roe v Wade. It moves away from viewing reproductive issues as civil rights and views them as human rights [3]. Advocates argue that the civil rights approach to reproductive issues made sure the legal right to abort was upheld but did not consider the effect of economic factors on reproductive choice. In the case of Maher v Roe, the Supreme Court ruled that the state did not have any obligation to assist in exercising constitutional rights, just not impede them. Historian Rickie Solinger has stated that people often view rights as things they have the right to exercise without needing extra resources. Therefore, reproductive justice advocates argue for abortion to be viewed as a human right so that the state would be responsible for making sure everyone had the freedom to make reproductive choices.

=== Reproductive oppression ===
‘Choice’ can be viewed as an exclusionary system, excluding many women from being able to make reproductive choices, for example women of color, immigrant women, queer and transgender women. SisterSong argue that the main reproductive movement separated abortion from other issues affecting communities of color like economic justice, the environment, immigrants’ rights and disability rights. The framework focuses on reproductive oppression. Asian Communities for Reproductive Justice (ACRJ) were one of the original groups to advocate for this framework. They explain:

“Reproductive oppression is the systematic control and exploitation of women and girls through their bodies, sexuality and reproduction. Women and girls’ bodies, sexuality and reproduction are regulated at the family, community, institutional and societal level. As such, reproductive oppression is the control of women’s bodies and labour through reproduction and is a tool and outcome of systems of oppression based on race, class, gender, sexuality, ability, age and immigration status.”

The founders of the framework argued that even though they had the legal right to abort they struggled to make reproductive choices as easily as their more privileged white middle class counterparts. They saw reproductive politics as a matter of justice. The framework looks at reproductive issues in the context of wider issues such as safety within communities and the government’s role within reproduction. For example advocates have argued that having the right to parent in safe environments includes issues like police brutality and the Flint water crisis. ACRJ (now known as Forward Together) state that reproductive justice is the “complete physical, mental, spiritual, political, economic and social well-being of women and girls”. This will be achieved when women and girls have the power and resources to make healthy decisions about their bodies, sexuality and reproduction. The framework focuses on changing structures, such as the responsibility of the government and society to make sure people can make reproductive choices.

=== Intersectionality ===
The framework utilises intersectionality. Advocates arue that those who are more oppressed due to their race, class, gender, sexuality or other identities will face more barriers in making reproductive choices, for example due to their income, location, immigration status or language they may struggle to access healthcare. Loretta Ross was a co-founder and national coordinator of SisterSong from 2005-2012. She explains that reproductive justice is a framework developed by women of colour to look at the interaction between race, gender, class, ability, nationality and sexuality.

The framework was described as intentionally controversial as it focuses on communities of color. Advocates want to make sure everyone can make autonomous reproductive choices by focusing on the needs of the most marginalised. The framework is used to look at issues such as; abortion, contraception, immigration, welfare, HIV/AIDS, environmental justice, indigenous rights, education, LGBTQ+ rights and disability.

== As a framework for research and practice ==
Reproductive Justice is, simultaneously, a feminist framework, praxis, and theory that counters the individualism of the mainstream reproductive health and rights movements. It was successfully used as a conceptual framework for activism and sexual and reproductive health programmes and interventions long before it was used as a theoretical frame for research. It can provide a profoundly social and deeply politicised analytical framework for empirical research on sexual and reproductive matters but there is far less clarity on how it should be applied. Some researchers have proposed methods for applying the framework in qualitative research, particularly in psychology.

== In the United States ==
=== Origins ===
==== Gender norms and race ====
Early movements for women’s liberation in the United States mainly focused largely on freeing white women from Victorian gender roles, which confined them to motherhood and the home under the “cult of domesticity.” However, Black women were largely excluded from these norms. Enslaved women’s fertility were a very profitable part of the slave trade due to their ability to reproduce, however this did not give them any real legal control over their reproduction. Scholars like Angela Davis have argued that because Black and white women were denied reproductive autonomy in different ways, the mainstream reproductive rights movement failed to address many of Black women’s needs.

==== Forced and coerced sterilization and birth control ====
In the early women’s rights movement that mainly focused on the rights of white women, reproductive rights were mainly understood as legal rights to abortion and contraception. The predominantly white advocates and organizations of this era focused almost exclusively on these goals, which contributed to the long-term exclusion of Black women and women of color from the mainstream movement. The early birth control movement had mainly white leadership and focused mainly on the needs that were being advocated by white women.

The beginning of the birth control movement in the United States alienated Black women in many ways. With mostly white leadership, advocates in this movement catered mainly to the needs of white women. Additionally, in the early 20th century, white nationalists spread the concept of "race suicide", the fear that white women using birth control would reduce the number of white babies being born, thus limiting the power and control of white people in the United States. This concept has been a driving force behind the history of forced and coerced sterilization of women of color around the world, including in the US. The most recent cases of non-consensual sterilization in the US occurred throughout the 20th century, targeting "women living with HIV, women who are ethnic and racial minorities, women with disabilities, and poor women, among others." Often, the "consent" for sterilization was obtained from women under distressing circumstances (i.e. during childbirth) or obtained without providing all of the necessary information regarding the sterilization. Other times, a woman's consent was not given, and the procedure was done when the woman thought she was receiving only a cesarean section. In many states, these sterilizations were publicly funded. Such sterilization efforts resulted in the near-elimination of some Native American tribes. According to Flores,

The mainstream feminist movement recognized coerced sterilization as a problem for black women, but continued to argue for easier access to sterilizations and abortions for themselves. Their demands directly and negatively impacted black women as they failed to take into account the needs of black women for protection from hospitals and government officials who would otherwise force black women to limit their reproduction.

The genocidal connotations and lack of consideration for forced sterilization in the birth control movement contributed to intersectional challenges faced by women of color. They also resulted in a movement of Black people against Black women's choice to use birth control or abortion, rather than producing more Black babies to build the community. This effectively divided the Black community. The birth control movement essentially espoused the idea that women could attain freedom and equality by receiving legal access to family planning services, which could help lift them out of poverty. While this may have been partially true for white women who were free of racist or classist discrimination, black women faced many more barriers that were blocking their way to liberation, by nature of being Black in such a racially unequal society. Margaret Sanger, a prominent contraceptive advocate who coined the term "birth control" in 1914, has been criticized for aligning with eugenicists in ways that perpetuated birth control as a method of population control. There are varying levels of agreement/disagreement with this criticism within the reproductive justice movement. In Killing the Black Body, Author Dorothy Roberts asserts that Sanger ultimately contributed significantly in the fight for contraception access but did so in a way that often shifted the focus away from reproductive autonomy and utilized eugenic ideas that were prominent at the time.

There is also a history of coercive promotion of birth control among women of color in the United States. Before their approval by the FDA, birth control pills were tested on Puerto Rican women who were not told they were participating in a clinical trial of little-tested medication, nor were they told about side effects that were occurring among their peers in the trial. Some women were not even told that the pills were meant to prevent pregnancy, and those who were told this were told it was 100% effective. Women in the trials were given doses ten times higher than what is actually needed to prevent pregnancy. Although a few trial participants died, they were not autopsied to discover if the drug was related to their deaths. More recently, women of color, women with low incomes, women in conflict with the law, and women who have used illicit drugs have been coerced into using long-acting reversible contraceptives (LARCs). Women have been given the choice between LARCs and jail, or have been told that they would lose their public benefits if they did not use LARCs. Medicaid has covered the implantation of LARCs, but not their removal, which has disproportionately affected women of color, who often experience poverty and rely on Medicaid. LARCS have also been disproportionately promoted to women of color. Many criticize these efforts as based in eugenics and seeking to curtail population growth among communities of color.

Some anti-abortion advocates cite the history of forced and coerced sterilization and birth control to argue that abortion targets Black communities. The movement cites the high abortion rates among Black women and the presence of abortion clinics in predominantly Black neighborhoods as evidence. Its methods center on erecting billboards across the country with messages like "Black children are an endangered species" and "The most dangerous place for an African American is in the womb." Reproductive justice advocates respond that Black women have higher abortion rates because they have higher unplanned pregnancy rates, which they attribute to disparities in healthcare and sex education. They also say that Black fertility rates are not in decline and that clinics are sited in low-income neighborhoods to increase access. Author Dorothy Roberts says:

Black women's wombs are not the main enemy of black children ... Racism and sexism and poverty are the main enemy of black children. [The billboard] doesn't highlight the issues behind why women are having so many abortions, it just blames them for doing it ... [These billboards] are essentially blaming black women for their reproductive decisions and then the solution is to restrict and regulate black women's decisions about their bodies.

==== Redefining reproductive rights ====
===== Women of color =====
Even when topics of racial genocide were no longer at the forefront of the birth control conversation, reproductive freedom for Black women was still not a priority of the mainstream civil rights movement in America.While reproductive politics were central to the mainstream feminist movement, they were often not addressed in ways that represented the needs of women of color as well as white women. These gaps in both the civil rights movement and the women's rights movement shed light on the need for Black women's organizations that would be separate from the existing movements focused only on racial equality without addressing women's specific needs or only on gender equality without addressing Black women's specific needs.

The committee to End Sterilization Abuse (CESA) was an organization formed in 1977 that was specifically dedicated to addressing the forced sterilization of Black women in the US. CESA created a "working paper" that essentially served as an open letter to mainstream feminist activists called Sterilization Abuse: A task for the Women's Movement. This paper highlighted one of the biggest intersectional challenges Black women faced in their fight for reproductive rights. It explained how despite not being addressed in mainstream feminism's fight for reproductive freedom, forced sterilization is indeed an infringement on one's reproductive rights, and one that disproportionately affected black women over white women. Calling attention to this infringement on the reproductive freedom of Black women was an important step in leading to the expansion of reproductive politics in the US.

Many new reproductive health organizations for women of color were created in the 1980s and 1990s, including the National Black Women's Health Project, and they objected to the rhetoric employed by the mainstream reproductive rights movement to define the issue of abortion along the narrow political advocacy lines that figured in abortion disputes since the 1973 Roe v. Wade Supreme Court decision legalizing abortion in the US. These new women-of-color-led organizations felt that the term "choice" excluded minority women and "masked the ways that laws, policies and public officials punish or reward the reproductive activity of different groups of women differently." Activists for the rights of women of color subsequently expanded their attentions from a focus on unfair sterilization practices and high rates of teen pregnancy among women of color to include the promotion of a more inclusive platform to advance the rights and choices of all women.

The concept of reproductive justice was first articulated in June 1994 at a national pro-choice conference by an informal Black Women's Caucus that met at the Illinois Pro-Choice Alliance in Chicago. This caucus preceded the 1994 International Conference on Population and Development (ICPD) that took place two months later and produced the Cairo Programme of Action, which identified reproductive health as a human right. After Cairo, the Black women promoting the reproductive justice framework sought to adapt the human rights framework outlined by the ICPD to the United States' reproductive rights movement. They coined the term "reproductive justice," defining it at first as "reproductive health integrated into social justice" by using the moral, legal, and political language of human rights.

In 1997, 16 organizations representing and led by Indigenous, Asian/Pacific Islander, Black, and Latinx women, including women who had been involved in the Black Women's Caucus, came together to form the SisterSong Women of Color Reproductive Justice Collective in order to create a national movement for reproductive justice. Their website states that reproductive justice is a human right, is about access (not choice), and is about more than just abortion. They argue that reproductive justice can be achieved by examining power structures and intersectionality, joining across identities and issues, and putting the most marginalized groups at the center of advocacy. SisterSong spearheaded the push for a new, comprehensive reproductive justice movement as a more inclusive alternative to the "divisive" argument for women's rights that primarily emphasized access to contraception and the right to an abortion. The founders of SisterSong also felt that some of the pro-choice activists "seemed to be more interested in population restrictions than in women's empowerment".

As SisterSong spread the concept of reproductive justice, the framework gradually won increasing support and prominence in the discussion of women's rights and empowerment. The 2003 SisterSong National Women of Color Reproductive Health and Sexual Rights Conference popularized the term and identified the concept as "a unifying and popular framework" among the various organizations that attended. In 2004, Jael Silliman and coauthors published the first book on reproductive justice, Undivided Rights: Women of Color Organizing for Reproductive Justice. Moving forward, reproductive justice groups modeled some of their rhetoric after Dr. George Tiller, a late-term abortion provider who was assassinated in his church in Wichita, Kansas, in 2009. He coined the phrase "Trust Women", which was used to promote abortion rights by arguing that women should be trusted to make their own decisions. "Trust Women" became the name of an organization and conference based on women's reproductive rights. Building on his legacy and the popularity of this phrase, SisterSong and reproductive justice advocates adopted Trust Black Women as an organizing slogan and the name of a national coalition of Black-women-led organizations led by SisterSong and devoted to advancing reproductive justice for the Black community (TrustBlackWomen.org).

Over the decades since SisterSong's birth, the group has inspired and mentored the creation of dozens of women-of-color-led reproductive justice organizations across the country. Groups that promote women's rights such as the National Organization for Women and Planned Parenthood have increasingly adopted the language of reproductive justice in their advocacy work. The movement has increasingly entered mainstream spaces, as organizations such as Law Students for Reproductive Justice have arisen to promote women's human rights using the reproductive justice framework. In 2016, Hillary Clinton used the term reproductive justice during her campaign for the presidency.

Asian and Pacific Islander women were a part of the reproductive justice movement through organizing and advocating for the ending of oppressive practices against them. Their movement included ending the sexualized stereotypes of API women which resulted in them being treated as commodities. On the other hand, API communities asexualized API women and force them into conformity in the private sphere. The "model minority" myth painted API immigrants as wealthy and resourceful, while many API women worked low-wage jobs with no health insurance. In response, API women formed many successful organizations such as Asian Immigrant Women Advocates (AIWA), The Committee on South Asian Women, and Asian and Pacific Islanders for Choice (APIC).

=== Issues ===
==== Sex education ====
Throughout the world, many people lack a quality understanding of sex education. According to The Pro-Choice Public Education Project, the US provides more funding towards abstinence-only sex education programs rather than comprehensive sex education programs. From 1996 through 2007, the US Congress committed over $1.5 billion to abstinence-only programs. When funding is not provided towards comprehensive sex education, students are not taught about how to prevent pregnancy and sexually transmitted infections from occurring. Advocates for Youth discusses how abstinence-only education programs are not effective at delaying the initiation of sexual activity or reducing teen pregnancy. Instead, graduates of abstinence-only programs are more prone to engage sexual activities without know how to prevent pregnancy and infection transmission. Reproductive justice advocates call for comprehensive sex education to be available to all young people.

==== Birth control ====
Reproductive justice advocates promote every individual's right to be informed about all birth control options and to have access to choosing whether to use birth control and what method to use. This includes advocacy against programs that push women of color, women on welfare, and women involved with the justice system to use LARCs. By providing women and trans people with knowledge about and access to contraception, the reproductive justice movement hopes to lower unwanted pregnancies and help people take control over their bodies.

Federal programs supported by reproductive justice activists date back to the Title X Family Planning program, which was enacted in the 1970s to provide low-income individuals with reproductive health services. Title X gives funding for clinics to provide health services such as breast and pelvic examinations, STI and cancer testing, and HIV counseling and education. These clinics are vital to low-income and uninsured individuals. Advocates for reproductive justice also aim to increase funding for these programs and increase the number of services that are funded.

==== Abortion access ====
Advocates for reproductive justice such as SisterSong and Planned Parenthood believe that all women should be able to obtain a safe and affordable abortion if they desire one. Having safe, local, and affordable access to abortion services is a crucial part of ensuring high-quality healthcare for women (and for trans and gender non-conforming people who can get pregnant). Access to abortion services without restrictive barriers is believed to be a vital part of healthcare because "...induced abortion is among the most common medical procedures in the US...Nearly half of American women will have one or more in their lifetimes." These organizations point to studies that show that when access to abortion is prohibitive or difficult, abortions will inevitably be delayed, and performing an abortion 12 weeks or longer into the pregnancy increases the risks to women's health and raises the cost of procedures. The American Medical Association echoes the importance of removing barriers to obtaining an early abortion, concluding that these barriers increase the gestational age at which the induced pregnancy termination occurs, thereby also increasing the risk associated with the procedure.

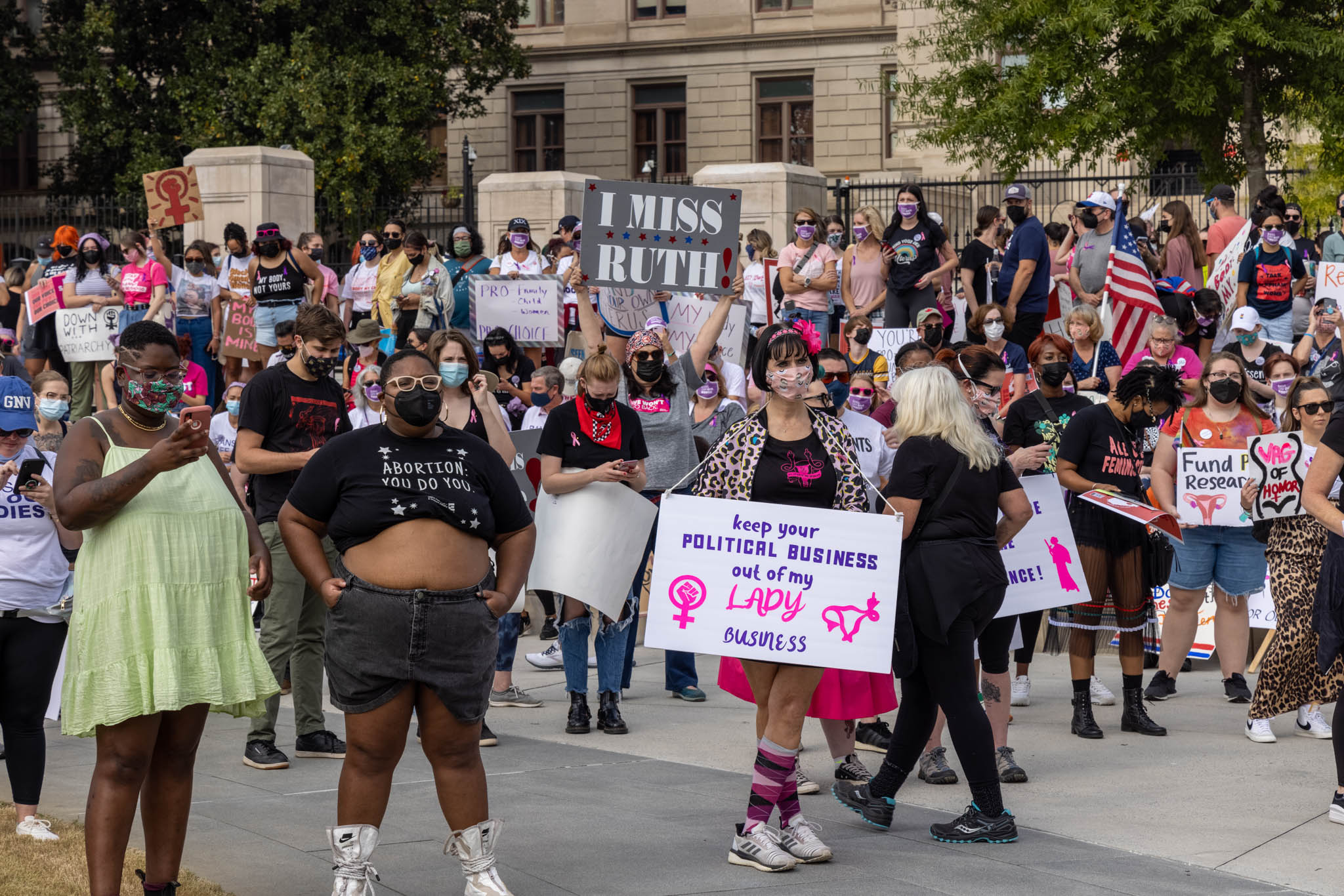
A Reproductive Justice March in Oxford, Georgia, was spurred on by the anti-abortion laws that began to pass in Texas. (October 2nd, 2021)

Minority groups experience poverty and high rates of pregnancy due to a lack of available sex education and contraception. In addition, women from low income households are more likely to turn to unsafe abortion providers, and as a result, they are more likely to be hospitalized for complications related to the procedure than higher-income women are. Although abortion was made legal nationwide in the Roe v. Wade Supreme Court decision of 1973, many obstacles to women's access remain. Young, low-income, LGBTQ, rural, and non-white women experience the greatest hurdles in their efforts to obtain an abortion in many parts of the U.S. Obstacles to obtaining an abortion in the US include a lack of Medicaid coverage for abortions (except in the case of certain circumstances, such as life endangerment), restrictive state laws (such as those requiring parental consent for a minor seeking an abortion), and conscience clauses allowing medical professionals to refuse to provide women with abortions, related information, or proper referrals. Additional obstacles to access include a lack of safety for providers and patients at abortion facilities, the conservative, anti-abortion political legislators and the citizens that support them, and a lack of qualified abortion providers, especially in rural states.

Abortion access is especially challenging for women in prisons, jails, and immigrant detention centers. Proponents of reproductive justice argue that withholding access to abortion in these facilities can be seen as a violation of the 8th Amendment preventing cruel and unusual punishments. A survey presented in Contraception found a correlation between Republican-dominated state legislatures and severely restricted coverage for abortion. Many anti-abortion groups are actively working to chip away at abortion by enacting restrictions that prevent more and women from obtaining the procedure. The research concludes that full access is not available in all settings, and correctional settings should increase the accessibility of services for women.

Organizations that promote reproductive justice such as NOW and Planned Parenthood aim to provide increased access to safe abortions at a low cost and without external pressure. They advocate increasing insurance coverage for abortions, decreasing the stigma and danger attached to receiving an abortion, eliminating parental notification for teens, training more physicians and clinics to provide safe abortions, and creating awareness about abortion.

==== After Dobbs ====
On June 24, 2022, the Supreme Court overturned Roe v. Wade in Dobbs v. Jackson Women’s Health Organization, removing the federal constitutional right to an abortion and giving states the power to outlaw abortion. Reproductive justice groups have stated that people of color and those from low-income backgrounds will be most impacted by this decision due to their inability to afford to get abortions outside of their state, take time off work and pay for childcare. The three dissenting justices, Stephen Breyer, Sonia Sotomayor and Elena Kagan, wrote that "women lacking financial resources will suffer from today's decision". An analysis by the National Partnership for Women & Families and In Our Own Voice: National Black Women’s Reproductive Justice Agenda showed that over 6.7 million Black women of reproductive age (57% overall) reside in states that have banned abortion or are likely to do so.

Reproductive justice groups have argued that many people would not have been able to access abortion under Roe due to amendments such as the Hyde Amendment. The aim should be to improve the situation beyond what it was prior to Dobbs. Following the decision, organisations increased abortion funds and travel networks. SisterSong played a key role as one of the main plaintiffs in a lawsuit against Georgia’s abortion restrictions.

==== Maternity care ====
Significant racial disparities have been recorded in relation to maternal and infant health outcomes in the USA. A CDC report found that black women and American Indian/Alaskans had a pregnancy related mortality ratio of 3.2 and 2.3 times that of white women respectively. Other research has shown the gap between black and white women to be between 2.6-4x greater.

This disparity exists regardless of the education levels or income of the mothers. The CDC report found that college educated black women have an over 5x greater pregnancy related mortality ratio compared to white women with similar education levels. Other research has found that black women with high degrees have higher rates of infant loss than white women without a high school education. A national survey on 5 common causes of maternal mortality found that black women were more likely to die from the same issues.

This disparity has been attributed to a number of factors. Black women are at a higher risk due to being in poverty and having less equal access to healthcare. Racial bias within the healthcare system has been found to play a role. Medical staff have been found to be less likely to believe that black patients are experiencing pain. In addition, a study found that around 50% of white medical students believed incorrect information about biological differences between black and white patients, for example that black people have thicker skin and do not feel as much pain. There have been cases where black women have died from treatable pregnancy complications, due to their concerns not being taken seriously. Some research has also attributed this to weathering. This is a theory that constant stress from racism takes its toll on your physical health. This can increase the risks of pregnancy and birthing. [87] Some researchers argue that there is no way to attribute the disparity to education or healthcare access, arguing that it is because the system does not value black women’s lives equally. (Reagan McDonald-Mosley, current Chief Medical Officer for Planned Parenthood Federation of America).

Many advocates for reproductive justice want systemic change to occur within healthcare systems to reduce the disparities. Many advocate for midwifery care. Midwifery is a practice that comes from communities of colour. Midwifery focuses on the person as a whole. Midwifery involves:

- Medically trained midwives to monitor mother, fetus and baby health and deliver the baby.
- Non-medically trained doulas providing emotional and practical support throughout pregnancy, labour and after birth.
- Lactation consultants providing support with breastfeeding.

Midwifery has been associated with better birth outcomes. However it is often not provided for through health insurance, meaning those on lower incomes struggle to access. Reproductive justice groups argue that increasing access will help reduce racial disparities. They argue that people should have the right to choose how and where they give birth, whether this be at home or a birth centre.

There are organizations working towards addressing these issues. The Black Mamas Matter Alliance (BMMA) was set up in 2016. It is a network in the USA working to improve black maternal health from a reproductive justice perspective. They organize Black Maternal Health Week each year and have put forward policy recommendations.

==== Pregnancy, birth, and postpartum during incarceration ====
Women of color are disproportionately targeted by the criminal justice and immigrant detention systems, particularly women with low incomes or from other sectors of society with limited access to healthcare. A Rhode Island report showed that 84% of women in prison had been sexually active within three months of their arrest, but only 28% had used contraception. Newly incarcerated women are therefore at a higher risk of unintended pregnancy. Many of these pregnancies also become high risk due to substance use before incarceration and lack of prenatal care services both before and during incarceration, leading to preterm deliveries, spontaneous abortions, low-birthweight infants, preeclampsia, or fetal alcohol syndrome. During incarceration, many women report challenges in accessing appropriate prenatal, birthing, and postpartum care, sometimes with disastrous and even life-threatening results. Women have been denied medical attention when in labor, shackled during labor even against the requests of medical professionals, and refused postpartum doctors' visits after high-risk births. Shackling in five-point restraints (both wrists, both ankles, and across the belly) during pregnancy and postpartum has been known to cause issues like a miscarriage (if a woman trips and cannot break her fall with her hands) and can reopen stitches from a cesarean. Women also reported being automatically confined to isolation after birthing and separation from newborns, which increases the risk of postpartum depression. Breastfeeding and pumping milk have also been prohibited, which is detrimental to maternal and infant health and to mother-baby bonding. Advocates in several states have been fighting these policies, often using a reproductive justice framework, and several have won policy changes. Doula groups have also formed to provide care to incarcerated and detained women, often using a reproductive justice framework.

Giving birth is typically the only choice that incarcerated women have. Pregnant women who are incarcerated are frequently not given the choice to not give birth. One of the core stances that Reproductive Justice, Feminism, and Reproductive Rights all stand on is access to abortion. Though the United States courts have ruled that imprisoned women do have access to abortion if legal in the state, incarcerated women are often not given that choice. This happens because they are either not allotted the choice or because it is too expensive. Once a person becomes incarcerated,becomes incarcerated, the insurance they had outside of prison, especially if provided by the state, like Medicare, becomes suspended. Many incarcerated women are forced to have children that they do not want because they cannot afford to pay for an abortion.

==== Forced sterilization and contraception ====
Prisons have demonstrated high incidents of human rights violations. These include cases of medical neglect and forced sterilization. Acts of forced sterilizations have often been used to justify punishments for imprisoned women. These violations continue to occur due to limited public attention towards cases of prisoner dehumanization and injustice. This leads to greater helplessness as imprisoned women lose say in the treatment of their bodies. For example, prisons often perform forced hysterectomies on imprisoned women. Article 7 of the International Covenant on Civil and Political Rights established by the United Nations prohibits cruel, degrading, inhumane torture. The lifelong effects of forced sterilization as well as the unnecessary suffering due to untreated disease violates these treaties.

Women with disabilities are one of the minorities that are greatly impacted by the deprivation of reproductive rights. They often experience discrimination, limitations to the type of contraception they are given, and forms of sterilizations. Many women with disabilities are coerced into sterilizations that they never gave consent to, and many doctors oftentimes make this decision for women or even family members that give consent to proceed with the sterilization process for them. This is seen as a violation, torture, or abuse to many women around the world who are deprived from their right to make their own choice for their body. Women with disabilities are also deprived from the right to choose what kind of contraception they use. When women with disabilities are compared to women without disabilities, the type of contraception they are given in clinics are quite different. Women with disabilities are mostly given a contraception that is long acting and reversible, while those with no disabilities are given moderately effective methods. This is in part a result of lack of knowledge and experience with patients with disabilities. When taking into account the many forced sterilizations and discriminations against minority women, eugenics can also be a part of the reason why these discriminations occur against women with disabilities and others. In the United States, forced sterilizations have occurred for eugenic purposes since after World War II. California being one of the states that allowed forced sterilizations in the 1940s, especially on minority groups of women that had prominent unfavored genes. Institutions in California reported to have sterilized about 381 people, but later the sterilizations ceased due to little scientific proof to decrease the unfavored genetics. However, disabled women were still one of the few groups in 1954 to have sterilizations be performed after no proof of effectiveness was found. Forced sterilizations have been performed on people of color, immigrant Latino women, mentally disabled women, physically disabled women, women from low income, and many more in the United States. These women are all a part of one or more minority groups that were targeted for not having the ideal genes or to limit the population growth.

==== Separation of families ====
The criminal justice, child welfare, and immigrant detention systems frequently target and separate families with marginalized identities, which advocates say is a reproductive justice issue. The cash bail system incarcerates only people who have low incomes and cannot afford bail, which often means people of color. Due to the Adoption and Safe Families Act, parents can then lose all legal rights to their children if they have been incarcerated for 15 of the last 22 months, even if they are still awaiting trial. Both incarceration and immigrant detention separate children from competent parents who want them, which is often deeply traumatic and can result in children being placed in the foster care system, where the likelihood of poor healthcare and educational outcomes increases, as does the likelihood of future criminal justice involvement, and these outcomes are worst for children of color.

==== LGBT people ====
Access to reproductive health services is more limited among the LGBTQ community than among heterosexuals. This is evident from the lower number of training hours that students going into the medical field receive on health problems faced by LGBTQ persons. Evidence also shows that once students complete training and become healthcare providers, they often adopt heteronormative attitudes towards their patients. In addition to lower educational standards and evident clinical prejudice against LGBTQ patients, there is also limited health research that is specifically applicable to LGBTQ community.

Like cisgender heterosexual people, LGBTQ people still need access to sex education, sexual and reproductive healthcare such as testing and treatment for sexually transmitted infections, birth control, and abortion. Despite myths to the contrary, LGBTQ people can still face unintended pregnancies. Many face increased risk for certain sexually transmitted infections, such as HIV. Access to fertility treatment and adoption is also a reproductive justice issue for many LGBTQ people who want to raise children. Likewise, prejudice against LGBTQ people is a reproductive justice issue impacting their personal bodily autonomy, safety, and ability to create and support healthy families. Self-determined family creation is a human right for all people, according to reproductive justice. Trans people share all of these reproductive justice issues; in addition, access to gender-affirming hormones is considered a reproductive issue necessary to their personal bodily autonomy. Trans people in the US, especially trans people of color, face the most severe prejudice and violence directed toward the LGBTQ community. Black trans women in particular are being murdered at alarming rates.

==== Economic justice ====
Due to systemic racism, women of color in the US earn considerably less than white men and also substantially less than white women or men of color. This impacts their ability to afford birth control, reproductive healthcare, and abortion, as well as their ability to have as many children as they want and raise their families with adequate resources. Due to economic constraints, women of color are more likely than other women to feel they need to abort pregnancies they want. They are also more likely to live in poverty because they have more children than they can easily afford to care for. Women with low incomes are more likely to rely on state social supports, which often further limit their access to birth control, reproductive health services, abortion, and high-quality maternity care such as midwifery services.

In 1976, Congress passed the Hyde Amendment, which barred federal Medicaid funding for most abortions. This caused low-income women further barriers in accessing reproductive health services, and meant that they would have to "forgo other basic necessities in order to pay for their abortion, or they must carry their unplanned pregnancy to term". The amendment results in the discrimination of poor women who "often need abortion services the most" and have "reduced access to family planning, and experience higher rates of sexual victimization". Due to systemic racism in the United States, women of color "disproportionately rely on public sources of health care", so the Hyde amendment impacted these women substantially.

==== Environmental justice ====
Because reproductive justice is tied to community well-being, Kathleen M. de Onı's 2012 article in Environmental Communication argues that reproductive justice should be understood alongside environmental justice and climate change. Reproductive justice advocates organize for environmental justice causes because issues like unhealthy drinking water and toxins in beauty products can impact physical and reproductive health and children's health. The Flint Michigan water crisis is often cited as an example of this because a low-income community primarily composed of people of color was forced to use toxic drinking water, a situation that advocates say likely would not have been inflicted upon a wealthier, whiter community. Environmental reproductive justice was built on the premise to ensure that women's reproductive health and capabilities are not limited by environmental pollution.

Immigration and reproductive justice

Reproductive justice includes the right to exercise autonomy over family structures and the right to reproduce. Oftentimes, deportation and immigration policy can affect family planning and structure in a fundamental way - if one parent is deported, it can lead to the restriction of a family's income and place an increased burden on a single parent. Additionally, being separated from a parent can lead to the traumatization of children.

Additionally, Immigration Customs Enforcement (ICE) has been criticized for the practice of forced sterilization of immigrant women in the custody of private detention facilities. Nurse Dawn Wooton, the whistleblower who brought attention to the lack of informed consent of immigrant patients at Irwin Country Detention Center, observed that "these immigrant women, I don't think they really, totally, all the way understand this is what's going to happen depending on who explains it to them."

Immigrant Latina women are often stereotyped as taking advantage of the opportunity to bear children in the U.S. to benefit from their children's citizenship. This leads to the infringement of many health care benefits and reproductive health care rights. Latina Immigrant women also often have to face poverty since without legal status, they do not have many work opportunities here in the U.S. which can interfere with child caregiving and the reproductive health of the mother. Furthermore, the immigration system in the United States infringes reproductive rights from women that are detained in immigration facilities. Women are either separated from their children by force, denied access to reproductive health care, or denied abortions. Immigrant women with legal status also face discrimination and fear, they live with fear that if they apply for government assistance to properly care for their children, their legal status will be negatively impacted.

Ability and reproductive justice

Worldwide, women with disabilities are sterilized significantly higher than the general population. The United States has a history of forced sterilization of people with disabilities - in the 1900s, more than 60,000 people were forcibly sterilized across the US due to a widespread belief in eugenics. In recent history, several practices in the US aimed at the sterilization of people with disabilities have been regarded with controversy. In 2007, "The Ashley Treatment" referred to a medical procedure in which parents of a disabled child elected for their daughter to undergo a hysterectomy and the removal of breast bud tissue, as well as hormone treatment that stunted her development.

==== Socioeconomic issues and reproductive oppression ====
The organization Asian Communities for Reproductive Justice, one of the key groups to define and promote reproductive justice, says that advocates of reproductive justice support a diversity of issues they consider necessary for women and trans people to make reproductive decisions free of constraint or coercion. These enabling conditions include access to reliable transportation, health services, education, childcare, and positions of power; adequate housing and income; elimination of health hazardous environments; and freedom from violence and discrimination. Because of the broad scope of the reproductive justice framework, reproductive justice activists are involved in organizing for immigrant rights, labor rights, disability rights, LGBTQ rights, sex workers' rights, economic justice, environmental justice, an end to violence against women and human trafficking, and more.

==== Alternative perspectives on contraception ====
Contraceptive health has been widely adopted in the majority of the Western world. It is also popular among young and educated populations in other parts of the world as well. More than half of the world is currently in stage 3 and stage 4 of the demographic transition model. This transition model describes the stages and shifts from a mentality of seeking to have as many children as possible, to the mentality of seeking smaller family size. Contraception remains a delicate topic in some areas of the world due to local cultural, and religious beliefs and traditional practices; in these places, contraceptive distribution is less likely to get public and government recognition. Under such pressure, healthcare providers may have a difficult time making decisions about whether to accommodate the beliefs of the general population to follow science-based guidelines or to refuse the provision of care.

Alternative explanations for contraceptive use such as "contraceptive mentality" have been believed among populations opposed to birth control application. The "contraceptive mentality" is a term used to describe the belief that contraception induces side effects from unnatural pregnancy prevention as well as encourages risky and irresponsible sexual behavior and undermines moral principles. In such a view, contraception is believed to be inherently wrong, associated with negative consequences, perceived as leading to "immoral behavior," considered unnatural, anti-life, and a form of abortion, and is thought to carry health risks and side effects, among other concerns.

== International ==
=== United Nations involvement ===
Under the umbrella of the United Nations, there are several entities whose objectives relate to or promote reproductive justice. Among them, the Convention on the Elimination of All Forms of Discrimination Against Women emphasizes the rights of women to reproductive health and to choose "the number and spacing" of their children, in addition to access to the resources that would allow them to do so. The Convention Against Torture and Other Cruel, Inhuman, or Degrading Treatment "has been interpreted to include denial of family planning services to women." The United Nations Committee on the Elimination of Racial Discrimination has also been involved with the reproductive justice movement, such as when SisterSong's Executive Director presented them with a shadow report written by SisterSong, the Center for Reproductive Rights, and the National Latina Institute for Reproductive Health in 2014. It described the US crisis in maternal mortality among mothers of color as a human rights issue, and the UN committee adopted all of the report's recommendations.

The United Nations also sponsors conferences and summits with the subject of the empowerment of women, and these events have historically advanced the reproductive justice movement. The International Conference on Population and Development is the primary example.

==== Conferences in Cairo and Beijing ====
The United Nations International Conference on Population and Development (ICPD) that took place in Cairo, Egypt in 1994 marked a "paradigm shift" to a set of policies on population that placed a high priority on the sexual and reproductive rights of women. Prior to the ICPD, international efforts to gauge population growth and to produce approaches that addressed its challenges focused on "strict and coercive" policy that included compulsory birth control and preferential access to health services by people who had been sterilized. The Programme of Action produced at the 1994 Cairo conference has been "heralded a departure from coercive fertility strategies" by insisting on the "fundamental rights of reproductive self determination and reproductive health care" and provided the ideological inspiration for grassroots organizations such as SisterSong in the United States to launch a movement for reproductive justice.

The United Nations Fourth World Conference on Women in Beijing followed the ICPD a year later, taking place in 1995, and producing a Platform for Action that advocated for the complete empowerment of all women. It charged states with the duty of ensuring the human rights of all women, among them the right to sexual and reproductive healthcare. The Beijing Platform for Action also promoted reproductive justice by calling on nations to reexamine laws that punished women for undergoing abortions.

==== Millennium Development Goals ====
The Millennium Declaration of September, 2000 and the eight Millennium Development Goals (MDGs) that emerged as a result of the declaration built on the framework for sexual and reproductive health rights the ICPD had put forth five years earlier. The third and fifth MDGs, to promote gender equality and empower women and to improve maternal health, respectively, embody the principles of reproductive justice through "the promotion of healthy, voluntary, and safe sexual and reproductive choices for individuals and couples, including such decisions as those on family size and timing of marriage." Indeed, the Outcome Document of the 2005 World Summit reiterates the connection between the Millennium Development Goals and their support of the many social factors that promote reproductive justice by committing the participating countries to reproductive health as related to the fulfillment of all eight Millennium Development Goals. Advocates of reproductive justice have noted that by extension, reproductive justice is critical to include in strategies to meet the MDGs.

=== U.S. foreign policy ===
Organizations that promote reproductive justice have criticized several United States policies that aim to remedy international issues of reproductive health.

The Mexico City Policy, also known by some critics as the Global Gag Rule, and the related Helms Amendment to the Foreign Assistance Act, are controversial US foreign policies that pertain to reproductive justice outside the US. The Helms Amendment prevents the expenditure of United States foreign aid funds on services related to abortion, while the Mexico City Policy prevents any NGOs funded by the United States from using their resources, even independently raised funds, for services related to abortion. This means that any organization which provide surgical or chemical abortions, counsel individuals that abortion is a choice available to them, or participate in advocacy for the expansion of abortion rights would be ineligible for financial assistance from the United States. The Mexico City Policy in particular has been so controversial that since its establishment in President Reagan's second term, it has been rescinded by every Democratic president to take office at the end of a Republican president's term, only to be reinstated by each Republican president to take office at the end of a Democratic president's term. With each policy change, NGOs have to reevaluate how to best support the reproductive health of marginalized women around the world in terms of both resources and bodily autonomy. Although the Mexico City Policy and Helms Amendment each only affect the right to abortion in theory, reproductive justice advocates argue that these policies have the side effect of crippling organizations that address other important issues such as prenatal healthcare, access to other forms of contraception, and STI screening and treatment.

The President's Emergency Plan for AIDS Relief (PEPFAR) is another contentious American program related to funding initiatives for global reproductive health. The purpose of the program is to combat the global HIV/AIDS pandemic, but agencies such as the Center for Health and Gender Equity (CHANGE) have called its methods and effectiveness into question. Critics say that it gives higher priority in funding distribution to faith-based organizations, including some "with little or no relevant international development experience" and some which promote abstinence instead of utilizing effective prevention methods. This policy approach, which has been nicknamed the ABC—Abstinence, Be faithful, Condom-use— poses a challenge to reproductive justice. Advocates hold that such policies marginalize groups of people such as LGBTQ persons who may be discriminated against, as well as women who have been raped, for whom "abstention is not an option." Although these organizations recognize the gains made by US aid as a whole, they argue that the rigid structure of the PEPFAR funding hinders a holistic, community-appropriate strategy to reduce HIV/AIDS infections, and they contend that the program is "laden with earmarks and restrictions from Washington that eliminate discretion for making funding decisions based on local realities and restrict alignment with European counterparts."

Another policy that has been condemned by reproductive justice advocates is the Anti-Prostitution Loyalty Oath (APLO) produced in 2003. Required by the United States to grant funding to non-governmental organizations that work to reduce the burden of HIV/AIDS internationally, this oath pledges to oppose sex trafficking and prostitution. Organizations that promote the empowerment of women, such as the International Women's Health Coalition, maintain that the oath is "stigmatizing and discriminatory" and that the groups of people opposed by the policy are precisely those who need help combating HIV/AIDS.

=== North America ===
==== Canada ====
===== Migrant Women and Temporary Farm Workers in Canada =====
Thousands of temporary farm workers, including many women, migrate to Canada through the Seasonal Agricultural Workers Program (SAWP). This program is part of Canada's Temporary Foreign Worker Program (TFWP). Researchers studying migrant women who enter into British Columbia, Canada through this program found that they face unique barriers that inhibit their bodily autonomy and freedom to make choices surrounding their sexual health through "state-level policies and practices, employer coercion and control, and circumstances related to the structure of the SAWP". These women are impacted by many factors that contribute to their marginalization, including precarious legal status, lack of access to health care services, poverty, knowledge and language barriers, and job insecurity.

Utilizing a reproductive justice framework to analyze this issue, researchers shift the focus from "abortion rights and sexual freedom" to governmental processes that inhibit access for women to be able to make choices that are "safe, affordable, and accessible". Women in SAWP are highly vulnerable due to the program's legal restrictions, which results in a limited access to social programs or services, labour rights and health care services.

As a result, migrant women in SAWP take part in "everyday" forms of resistance to injustices and oppression. Rather than large scale forms of protest or objection, tactics to resist these forms of oppression are more subtle. Forms of resistance for these women often involve private disobedience of restrictive regulations, informing the media anonymously of injustices, finding and accessing forms of birth control or reproductive health services even when discouraged from doing so, forging relationships, and building a community as well as seeking the aid of advocacy groups.

=== Asia ===
In Southeast Asia, Timorese women still face many struggles, they are still fighting for quality and equal reproductive rights. There is still a lot of violence against women, meaning they are still fighting for gender equality. Many Timorese citizens identify as Catholic, almost ninety-five percent, which may have an impact on their rights and sexual health choices. Research has shown that in this town, many women are having sex in order to become pregnant, however many of the men were partaking in sexual relations in order to fulfill their sexual desires. Both genders hardly acknowledged pleasure for the women. The women do as they are told, and if their husband wants sex, it is their job to fulfill his needs.

== Interventions addressing reproductive injustice ==
The framework of reproductive justice has been used in the social sciences for years, but reproductive justice organizations also advocate for applying it in real life to combat reproductive injustice. Sistersong states that to achieve reproductive justice it is necessary to "analyze power systems" and "address intersecting oppressions." The medical industrial complex is one power system where advocacy organizations are attempting to implement tenants of reproductive justice. They argue that doing so would combat existing inequality within the healthcare system, especially for marginalized groups that face discriminatory barriers to care.

=== Applying Reproductive Justice to the Medical Field ===
==== Nursing ====
There is a growing body of academic literature on applying reproductive justice to the medical field, including in the fields of nursing, obstetrics, and gynecology. Studies show that healthcare inequality is a form of structural violence against marginalized groups, and that adopting the concept of reproductive justice in the field of nursing could help promote maternal and infant health. In particular, Black women face the highest maternal mortality rate in the United States, due to a number of structural issues. But reproductive justice has been shown to reframe public health and nursing for Black women in a way that reduces the impact of that structural harm. A reproductive justice approach to nursing encourages healthcare providers to take into account systems of oppression and historical injustices that may impact the way their patients present symptoms and how they experience medical care. Reproductive justice advocates argue that "multilevel interventions" are needed to effectively address intersecting oppression in the healthcare system, and that reproductive justice gives medical professionals the tools they need to achieve them.

==== Sexual and Reproductive Healthcare ====
Reproductive justice organizations primarily focus on applying a reproductive justice framework to sexual and reproductive healthcare. Studies show that a reproductive justice approach to clinical care gives healthcare providers insight into social injustices and obstacles that prevent marginalized populations from seeking reproductive health care. Low-income women, women of color, young women, immigrant women, and women with disabilities all face barriers to accessing family planning, abortion care, and even routine reproductive health services. A reproductive justice approach to clinical care allows healthcare providers to reduce the barriers their patients face in order to meet their sexual and reproductive health needs, according to recent studies.

Access to contraception is a core reproductive right, as it enables people to control if and when they become a parent. Yet the history of birth control is rooted in the eugenics movement, and its development was only possible because of clinical research that exploited women of color and women with disabilities. Because of this, reproductive justice organizations advocate for recognizing the impact of white supremacy on sexual and reproductive health and developing a nuanced and intersectional approach to clinical care. This includes acknowledging that marginalized populations face the greatest barriers to accessing contraception and other reproductive health services, but are also targeted for control over their bodies and families. Three organizations in particular—EverThrive Illinois, Bold Futures, and SisterReach—are advocating to change the way health providers approach contraception. They use the reproductive justice framework to reimagine sexual and reproductive healthcare, and to seek policy changes at the state and national levels that would improve the healthcare system.

=== Shackling of Pregnant Prisoners ===
One area where reproductive justice has been applied to real world advocacy is reproductive healthcare for incarcerated people, particularly when it comes to the use of restraints on pregnant prisoners. In 2022, there were over 180,684 incarcerated women in the United States, most of whom are of reproductive age. Many incarcerated women already have children, and they are disproportionately Black women and other people of color. Advocacy organizations have used a reproductive justice framework to help incarcerated women understand their reproductive health needs and to advance "reproductive health equity" more broadly.

Around 58,000 pregnant women are incarcerated each year in the United States. Often, they struggle to access prenatal care, and some even have to give birth in prison without proper healthcare. Even when they are transported to hospitals to give birth, many pregnant prisoners are shackled during transport, labor, and evening during active childbirth. Some states have passed legislation restricting such treatment of pregnant prisoners, but the practice persists in many parts of the country. Currently only 20 states have outlawed the practice entirely, while 21 have partial restrictions and 9 states—Alaska, Iowa, Kansas, Michigan, Montana, North Dakota, South Dakota, Wisconsin, and Wyoming—have no restrictions in place at all.

There are organizations currently working to spread information about reproductive healthcare for incarcerated people, and many of them advocate against the practice of shackling pregnant prisoners.

==== Advocacy and Research on Reproductive Wellness of Incarcerated People ====
Advocacy and Research on Reproductive Wellness of Incarcerated People (ARRWIP) is an organization whose stated aim is to improve reproductive rights for incarcerated women and to help them thrive in their communities. Shackling of pregnant prisoners is one issue they advocate on. They provide information on which states allow shackling, do research on the effects of the practice, and provide resources to incarcerated women so that they know their rights and can advocate for themselves. Even in states where shackling incarcerated women during pregnancy and childbirth is not allowed, many prison officials and hospitals still do so. The information they provide helps incarcerated women and other citizens ensure that their local hospitals, jails, and prisons are not breaking the law.

==== The American Civil Liberties Union ====
The American Civil Liberties Union (ACLU) lobbied for the First Step Act, which was signed into law in 2018. The law enacted many different criminal justice reforms, including prohibiting the shackling of pregnant prisoners in federal custody. The organization has also worked to pass similar legislation at the state level, including in Arizona, Maryland, and Massachusetts, and the Virgin Islands.

==== The American Medical Association ====
In their Journal of Ethics, the American Medical Association (AMA) has published articles speaking out against the practice of shackling pregnant prisoners. They assert that because correctional facilities were originally designed as male-centered institutions, in modern-day they often neglect the needs of incarcerated women. These needs include adequate reproductive health care. The AMA argues that for incarcerated women, pregnancy and birth are handled in ways that would be unacceptable in other circumstances. The shackling of women during pregnancy and labor is a primary example of this phenomenon.

=== Other Advocacy Efforts ===
==== Comprehensive Sex Education Policy ====
Many reproductive justice organizations advocate for standardized and informative sexual health education in schools around the world. In the United States, sexual health education is often a controversial and politicized topic, and curriculum varies widely from state to state. This means students in some states receive misinformation, and curriculum that addresses key aspects of sexuality and reproductive health is sometimes deliberately excluded. Standardized and medically accurate sexual health curriculum results in fewer unwanted pregnancies and lower STI rates because it provides students with the resources necessary to make informed decisions about their reproductive health.

== See also ==
- Black feminism
- Choice USA
- COLOR Latina
- Compulsory sterilization
- Health disparities
- imMEDIAte Justice Productions
- INCITE! Women of Color Against Violence
- Intersectionality theory
- National Women's Health Network
- Sara Dubow, author of Ourselves Unborn: A History of the Fetus in Modern America (Oxford University Press, 2010).

== Sources ==
- Boyd-Judson L (2013). Women's Global Health: Norms and State Policies. Lanham, Maryland: Lexington Books. p. 73. ISBN 978-0-7391-8888-0.
- Chandler C (2013). "Death & Dying in America: The Prison Industrial Complex's Impact on Women's Health". Berkeley Women's Law. 18 (1): 40. Archived from the original on 2017-09-26.
- Clarke JG, Rosengard C, Rose JS, Hebert MR, Peipert J, Stein MD (May 2006). "Improving birth control service utilization by offering services prerelease vs postincarceration". American Journal of Public Health. 96 (5): 840–5. doi:10.2105/ajph.2005.062869. PMC 1470571. PMID 16571698.
- Collins C, Alagiri P, Summers T, Morin SF (2002). Abstinence Only vs. Comprehensive Sex Education: What Are the Arguments?. San Francisco: AIDS Research Institute, University of California.
- Correa S, Petchesky R (2013). "Reproductive and Sexual Rights: A Feminist Prospective". In McCann CR, Kim SK (eds.). Feminist theory reader: local and global perspectives (Third ed.). Abingdon-on-Thames: Routledge. pp. 88–102. ISBN 978-0-415-52102-4.
- Crane BB, Smith CE (2006). "Access to Safe Abortion: An essential strategy for achieving the millennium development goals to improve maternal health, promote gender equality, and reduce poverty" (PDF). Public Choices, Private Decisions: Sexual and Reproductive Health and the Millennium Development Goals.
- Denbow JM (2015). Governed through Choice: Autonomy, Technology, and the Politics of Reproduction. New York City: New York University Press. pp. 141–142. ISBN 978-1-4798-4391-6.
- Fried MG (2000). "Abortion in the United States: barriers to access". Health and Human Rights. 4 (2): 174–94. doi:10.2307/4065200. JSTOR 4065200. PMID 10796974.
- Harper CC, Henderson JT, Darney PD (2005). "Abortion in the United States". Annual Review of Public Health. 26: 501–12. doi:10.1146/annurev.publhealth.26.021304.144351. PMID 15760299.
- Kirk G, Okazawa-Rey M (2012). Women's Lives: Multicultural Perspective (6th ed.). New York City: McGraw-Hill Education. pp. 247–250. ISBN 978-0-07-351234-1.
- Levi R (April 1, 2006). "Doing What Is Medically Necessary". Off Our Backs. 36 (4): 77–81. Archived from the original on 2016-09-10 – via HighBeam Research.
- Oswalt K, Hale GJ, Cropsey KL, Villalobos GC, Ivey SE, Matthews CA (August 2010). "The contraceptive needs for STD protection among women in jail". Health Education & Behavior. 37 (4): 568–79. doi:10.1177/1090198110362467. PMID 20705810. S2CID 6625036.
- Poggi S (2006). "The Hyde Amendment Violates Reproductive Justice and Discriminates against Poor Women and Women of Color". Reproductive Justice Briefing Book. Berkeley, California. p. 14.
- Price K (2010). "What is Reproductive Justice?: How Women of Color Activists Are Redefining the Pro-Choice Paradigm". Meridians: Feminism, Race, Transnationalism. 10 (2): 42–65. doi:10.2979/meridians.2010.10.2.42. S2CID 145330421.
- Ross L (2007). "What is Reproductive Justice?". Reproductive Justice Briefing Book: A Primer on Reproductive Justice and Social Change. Berkeley, California: UC Berkeley School of Law.
- Rossi AS (1988). The Feminist Papers: From Adams to de Beauvoir. Lebanon, New Hampshire: Northeastern University Press. pp. 138–139, 533. ISBN 978-1-55553-028-0.
- Sanger A (2004). Beyond Choice: Reproductive Freedom In The 21st Century. New York City: PublicAffairs. pp. 19–47. ISBN 978-1-58648-116-2.
- Sanger M (2010). Woman and the New Race. Whitefish, Montana: Kessinger Publishing. pp. 93–100. ISBN 978-1-162-71762-3. Archived book from 1920 New York City: McGraw-Hill Education
- Silliman J, Marlene GF, Ross L, Gutierrez ER (2004). Undivided Rights: Women of Color Organize for Reproductive Justice. Brooklyn: South End Press. p. 40. ISBN 978-0-89608-729-3.
- Smith A (2005). "Beyond Pro-Choice versus Pro-Life: Women of Color and Reproductive Justice" (PDF). NWSA Journal. 17 (1): 119–140. doi:10.2979/NWS.2005.17.1.119 (inactive 21 April 2026). ISSN 1040-0656. JSTOR 4317105. S2CID 3760837.
- Springer SA (January 2010). "Improving healthcare for incarcerated women". Journal of Women's Health. 19 (1): 13–5. doi:10.1089/jwh.2009.1786. PMC 2828190. PMID 20088653.
- Sufrin CB, Creinin MD, Chang JC (March 2009a). "Incarcerated women and abortion provision: a survey of correctional health providers". Perspectives on Sexual and Reproductive Health. 41 (1): 6–11. doi:10.1363/4100609. PMID 19291123.
- Sufrin CB, Creinin MD, Chang JC (December 2009b). "Contraception services for incarcerated women: a national survey of correctional health providers". Contraception. 80 (6): 561–5. doi:10.1016/j.contraception.2009.05.126. PMID 19913150.
- Sufrin CB, Tulsky JP, Goldenson J, Winter KS, Cohan DL (March 2010). "Emergency contraception for newly arrested women: evidence for an unrecognized public health opportunity". Journal of Urban Health. 87 (2): 244–253. doi:10.1007/s11524-009-9418-8. PMC 2845828. PMID 20012702.
- Swinski JS (2007). Adapting to Norms at the United Nations: The Abortion-rights and Anti-abortion Networks. Ann Arbor, Michigan. p. 254. ISBN 978-0-549-45105-1.
- Asian Communities for Reproductive Justice (2005). "A New Vision for Advancing Our Movement for Reproductive Health, Reproductive Rights, and Reproductive Justice" (PDF). Oakland.
- "SisterSong Women of Color Reproductive Health Collective" (PDF). SisterSong. Atlanta. p. 4.
- What is the Evidence? San Francisco: AIDS Policy Research Center & Center for AIDS Prevention Studies, University of California
