= Black Women's Health Imperative =

- Formation: 1984; 42 years ago
- Region served: United States
- Website: Official website

Black Women's Health Imperative, previously the National Black Women's Health Project, was formed in 1983 in Atlanta, Georgia out of a need to address the health and reproductive rights of African American women. NBWHP was principally founded by Byllye Avery. Avery was involved in reproductive healthcare work in Gainesville, Florida in the 1970s and was particularly influenced by the impact that policy had on women of color and poor women. Additionally Avery was also concerned with healthcare choices and wanted "to provide an environment where women could feel comfortable and take control of their own health" (Silliman et al., 66).

Lillie Allen, a healthcare educator, (who is not formally listed on the organization's website but is cited in other sources) was primarily concerned with birthing choices of African Americans as well as internalized racism within the community. Both women worked with the National Women's Health Network and started the project within the organization.

Eventually they extracted "The Project" from the NWHN because of concern regarding the lack of focus on the issues facing black women and poor women which played out through the events that occurred during the National Conference on Black Women's Health Issues at Spelman College in 1983 (Silliman et al., 69). Because of the two main focuses on self-help and the medical establishment as an institution, the NBWHP ebb and flows between a grassroots operation that focuses on the community of women and one that focused on policy. By 1987, the National Black Women's Health Project were headquartered in Atlanta, Georgia and housed offices in Brooklyn, New York and the Bay Area of California. The New York City office was directed by Gwen Braxton. The National Black Women's Health Project later opened an office in Washington, DC to address policy issues and moved their headquarters to Washington, DC. NBWHP has changed their name to the Black Women's Health Imperative.

== US Health Statistics ==
“What causes all this sickness?” [Byllye Avery] asked. “Like cardiovascular disease—it’s the number one killer [of Black women]. What causes all that heart pain?” She answered herself by linking the physical maladies of Black women to the male violence that kept them in a lifelong state of emotional distress. “When sisters take their shoes off and start talking about what’s happening, the first thing we cry about is violence,” she explained. “The number one issue for most of our sisters is violence—battering, sexual abuse. Same thing for their daughters, whether they are twelve or four”

African American women's health in the US is continuously shown to be far worse than that of any other group of women in any other racial or ethnic group. Currently, African American women have higher rates of morbidity regarding health issues like obesity, diabetes, and adverse birth outcomes. African American women are also more likely to die from certain cancers, cardiovascular disease and HIV/AIDS. There are many different factors intertwined within our society that contribute to these health disparities, many of which reflect on the effects of experienced racism on day to day lives.

Some factors that contribute to the health disparities within the community of African American women in the US are related to one’s sociodemographic status, sexual orientation, geographic location and age. Research has shown that income and higher education are strongly correlated to one’s overall health, along with showing that African American women who make a higher income experience improved cardiovascular health. Education has also been found to be strongly correlated with improved health outcomes within African American women. This reflects the idea that there are three levels of racism that continue to affect one’s physical health. These levels consist of institutionalized racism, personally mediated racism, and internalized racism. These levels of racism have a direct contribution to women's health, as it was found that foreign-born mothers were more likely to be older, married, and better educated. Foreign born women were also shown to have better pre-pregnancy weight along with having higher rates of prenatal care than those born in the US. It was also found that foreign born mothers were less likely to give birth prematurely.

Many of these health issues stem from the fact that African American women are less likely than a white woman to receive many of the needed health services, including routine preventative care. In the past five decades, African American women have experienced a risk that is 4-times greater regarding death from pregnancy complications than a white woman. Four out of five African American women are considered to be overweight or obese. One in four African American women aged 55 and up are affected by diabetes, making them almost 2 times more likely to have diabetes than white women. It was also discovered that statistically white women reported receiving more prenatal advice on alcohol, smoking and the importance of breast-feeding than African American women. African American women were also found to be 23 times more likely to die from preexisting health issues like preeclampsia, eclampsia, abruptio placentae, placenta previa, and postpartum hemorrhage than white women. African American women reportedly have significantly less trust in their own physicians due to past experiences in our health-care system. It was also shown that African American women have higher levels of trust in informal health informational sources, some which may not be factually based.

== Aims ==
The project's five Health Imperatives for Black Women are:

- Make black women's health an imperative for federal and state governments and communities.
- Work to eliminate the health disparities that exist for black women.
- Ensure that black women have access to reproductive health options, are empowered to make real choices and are assured of privacy in reproductive decision-making.
- Reduce the high death rates among black women from preventable causes.
- Increase access to health insurance coverage for black women and their families.

== Contributions ==
National Black Women's Health Project initiated projects that were geared towards the totality of women's health in addition to reproductive healthcare. The projects included "Walking for Wellness [that featured]…Wilma Rudolph, to encourage African American women to improve their health through exercise" (Silliman et al., 77). Additional programs included education about birth control options as well as a video to encourage women to look at their vaginas through self-exam. On their website there are resources regarding healthcare issues as well choices. The NBWHP publish the book, Body and Soul: A Black Women's Guide to Health and Well-Being by Linda Villarosa and Our Bodies, Our Voice, Our Choices which serves as "a black women's primer on reproductive health and rights" (Silliman et al., 78).

== Controversies ==
During the 1992 March for Women's Lives, there was conflict in the planning of the march between NOW and smaller feminist groups of colour. The protest was headed by Byllye Avery because of the continuation of issues concerning race and representation. While organizations eventually were asked to speak many stood in solidarity with Avery because "She was the first woman of color to come forward publicly and nationally for reproductive rights" (Suh 89).
