= Women's health movement in the United States =

The women's health movement (WHM, also feminist women's health movement) in the United States refers to the aspect of the American feminist movement that works to improve all aspects of women's health and healthcare. It began during the second wave of feminism as a sub-movement of the women's liberation movement. WHM activism involves increasing women's knowledge and control of their own bodies on a variety of subjects, such as fertility control and home remedies, as well as challenging traditional doctor-patient relationships, the medicalization of childbirth, misogyny in the health care system, and ensuring drug safety.

Notable organizations associated with the women's health movement include the Jane Collective, the Boston Women's Health Book Collective, the Feminist Abortion Network, the National Women's Health Network, the Black Women's Health Imperative and the Native American Women's Health Education Resource Center. Other results of WHM activism are the creation of feminist health centers, the Dalkon Shield lawsuit, the DES daughters lawsuit, and the Nelson Pill Hearings, which resulted in the inclusion of medication package inserts to insure informed consent for women taking oral contraceptive pills. Notable books and media resulting from this movement include Women and Madness by Phyllis Chesler, Our Bodies, Ourselves by the Boston Women's Health Book Collective, The Myth of the Vaginal Orgasm by Anne Koedt, and La Operación.

The WHM is unique from the abortion-rights movement in that the WHM has a wider scope of issues in relation to women and their health. The health clinics, groups, and activists of the WHM also advocate "nonprofessional caregivers, self-help, emphasis on alternative (nonprescription) remedies when possible, demystification of health information and providers, and clinic administration and control by nonprofessional women."

== Historical context ==
The women's health movement has origins in multiple movements within the United States: the popular health movement of the 1830s and 1840s, the struggle for women/midwives to practice medicine or enter medical schools in the late 1800s and early 1900s, black women's clubs that worked to improve access to healthcare, and various social movements in the 1960s.

Helen Marieskind argues that like the popular health movement of the 19th century, the WHM worked to redefine health care, empower women, and support "preventive health concepts, self-awareness... [a] knowledge of bodily processes, and... demystify[ing] medicine." Barbara Ehrenreich and Deirdre English, in their work Witches, Midwives, and Nurses (1972), also compare the two movements.

The WHM shares ideology with other New Left movements. The environmental and anti-nuclear movements, like the WHM, oppose militarism, critique corporations and government agencies, express the need to protect humans and the environment from hazards, and stress the importance of Nothing About Us Without Us. Women and gender studies scholar Jennifer Nelson says that neighborhood health centers created by civil rights and other New Left activists were the "intellectual, political, and practical experiential precedents," for feminist health centers, which were one major result of the women's health movement.

The women's health movement grew directly out of the women's liberation movement during the late 1960s.

=== Women's liberation movement ===
Just as the Women's Suffrage movement grew out of the Abolition Movement, the Women's Liberation Movement grew out of the struggle for civil rights. Though challenging patriarchy and the anti-patriarchal message of the Women's Liberation Movement was considered radical, it was not the only, nor the first, radical movement in the early period of second-wave feminism. Rather than simply desiring legal equality, members believed that the moral and social climate in the United States needed to change. Though most groups operated independently—there was no national umbrella organization—there were unifying philosophies of women participating in the movement. Challenging patriarchy and the hierarchical organization of society which defined women as subordinate, participants in the movement believed that women should be free to define their own individual identity as part of human society. One of the reasons that women who supported the movement chose not to create a single approach to addressing the problem of women being treated as second-class citizens was that they did not want to foster an idea that anyone was an expert or that any one group or idea could address all of the societal problems women faced. They also wanted women, whose voices had been silenced, to be able to express their own views on solutions. Among the issues were the objectification of women, reproductive rights, opportunities for women in the workplace, redefining familial roles. A dilemma faced by movement members was how they could challenge the definition of femininity without compromising the principals of feminism. They were not interested in reforming existing social structures, but instead were focused on changing the perceptions of women's place in society and the family and women's autonomy. Rejecting hierarchical structure, most groups which formed operated as collectives where all women could participate equally. Typically, groups associated with the Women's Liberation Movement held consciousness-raising (CR) meetings where women could voice their concerns and experiences, learning to politicize their issues. To members of the WLM, rejecting sexism was the most important objective in eliminating women's status as second-class citizens.

By attending CR groups, women around the United States participated in "a process in which the sharing of personal stories led to a "click"--a sudden recognition that sexism lay at the root of their struggles." This process included sharing their healthcare experiences with each other. They discussed topics such as illegal abortions, rape, negative experiences with doctors during childbirth and gynecologist visits, sexuality, birth control, and other aspects of women's health. This led them to "campaign to change how doctors, the government, the media, and the medical field treat...women and their bodies."

== Issues and ideology ==
WHM activism covers topics such as access to reproductive technology and birth control, sterilization abuse, advocating against unnecessary medical intervention during childbirth, increasing access to healthcare through the creation of feminist health centers and self-help clinics, teaching women about their bodies, discovering the history of women in medicine, critiquing the misogyny in the healthcare system, and creating health advocacy groups for women. Due to the political and collective nature of the WHM, Helen Marieskind calls the ideology of the movement Feminist-Socialism.

They view the relationship between women and their doctors (especially male gynecologists) as similar to women's second-class status in society. WHM activists argue that the institution of medicine is "embedded in, and an embodiment of," patriarchal society and is an institution of social control. Nearly all of the early literature from the WHM argued that medicine and doctors work to subordinate women, people of color, and the poor; doctors are too powerful; healthcare costs too much; and that conventional healthcare leaves patients with little to no dignity, right to health information, or ability to choose their treatment.

== 1969–1973 ==
The women's liberation movement, and consequently the WHM, were grassroots, so there were many different groups of women organizing around women's health issues in the United States at the beginning of the second wave of feminism. Anthropologist Sandra Morgen argues that there are four founding events of the WHM: the workshop and research that led to the writing of Our Bodies, Ourselves in Boston, the founding of the underground abortion service by the Jane Collective in Chicago, Carol Downer and Lorraine Rothman's self-help gynecology in Los Angeles, and Barbara Seaman's (New York) and Belita Cowan's (Ann Arbor) work to expose the health risks of the oral contraceptive pill and diethylstilbestrol. Ninia Baehr includes the activism of Patricia Maginnis and the Army of Three–even though their activism around abortion began in 1959–because they were the first to frame abortion around women's rights and the idea that women, not doctors or lawmakers, should be the ones to make decisions around abortion.

=== Society for Human Abortion and the Army of Three ===
“We will never give over the control of our numbers to the women themselves. What, let them control the future of the human race? With abortions it is in our hands; we make the decisions, and they must come to us.”

— A male gynecologist to Margaret Sanger, as quoted in her autobiography

Patricia Maginnis founded the Citizens Committee for Humane Abortion Laws (CCHAL) in 1962, while she attended San Jose State University. In 1963, she moved the organization to San Francisco and Rowena Gurner joined CCHAL. In 1964, Gurner and Maginnis changed the organization's name to The Society for Humane Abortion (SHA) and in 1965 it was incorporated as a non-profit organization in California. SHA advocated for "elective abortion," that all women had the right to safe and legal abortion free of harassment, and that "[the] termination of pregnancy is a decision which the person or family involved should be free to make as their own religious beliefs, values, emotions, and circumstances may dictate." The SHA believed in the repeal of all abortion laws, including the 1963 Humane Abortion Act, which made abortion legal in cases of rape or incest. While still heading the Society for Humane Abortion, Maginnis set-up another organization in 1966 to carry on an underground feminist health referral system. The main mission of this organization, Association to Repeal Abortion Laws (ARAL), was to connect pregnant women with abortion providers in neighboring countries. Their list of abortion specialists was well-researched and depended on members' information and the feedback of the women they referred.

Together, the Army of Three (Maginnis, Gurner, and Lana Phelan) planned and executed civil disobedience actions in the late 1960s in order to overturn abortion laws in California. In 1968, after multiple bouts of handing out pamphlets with information about contraception and sexually transmitted infections (which was illegal under San Francisco's Municipal Ordinance 188), Maginnis was arrested. The outcome of her case overturned this local ordinance, but the Army of Three wanted to challenge the state law. To do this, they created abortion 'classes,' which Maginnis was eventually arrest for in San Mateo county. The case wasn't settled until after Roe v. Wade liberalized abortion laws in the United States, but they did succeed in overturning California's abortion law.

=== DES ===
Diethylstilbestrol (DES) was discovered in 1938 and until 1971, it was given to pregnant women with the incorrect belief that it would reduce the risk of pregnancy complications and losses. In the late 1960s, a study published in JAMA endorsed the use of DES as an emergency contraceptive, saying that it have no negative side effects. Belita Cowan began researching the side effects of DES as a morning after pill at this time, because it was she had read medical literature that said DES caused clear cell carcinoma, a rare vaginal tumor, in girls and women who had been exposed to this medication in utero. She also heard from her friends that the pill caused severe nausea for a short period of time. Cowan brought together a group of female former patients at the University of Michigan’s student health center and organized Advocates for Medical Information. This group aimed to educate women in the side effects of the DES pill and to oppose the use of it at the University Hospital and other health centers in the country. In 1971, the organization received a grant from the student government to undertake a survey of women who had taken DES. Out of the sixty-nine women who responded, only a quarter of them were contacted by doctors after taking the medication. This proved that the advertisements for DES were fraudulent. After concluding her research about the side effects of DES, Cowan believed that women around the country should know about the effects of the drug. She contacted Ralph Nader and other feminists to host a press conference in Washington, D.C., in December 1972.

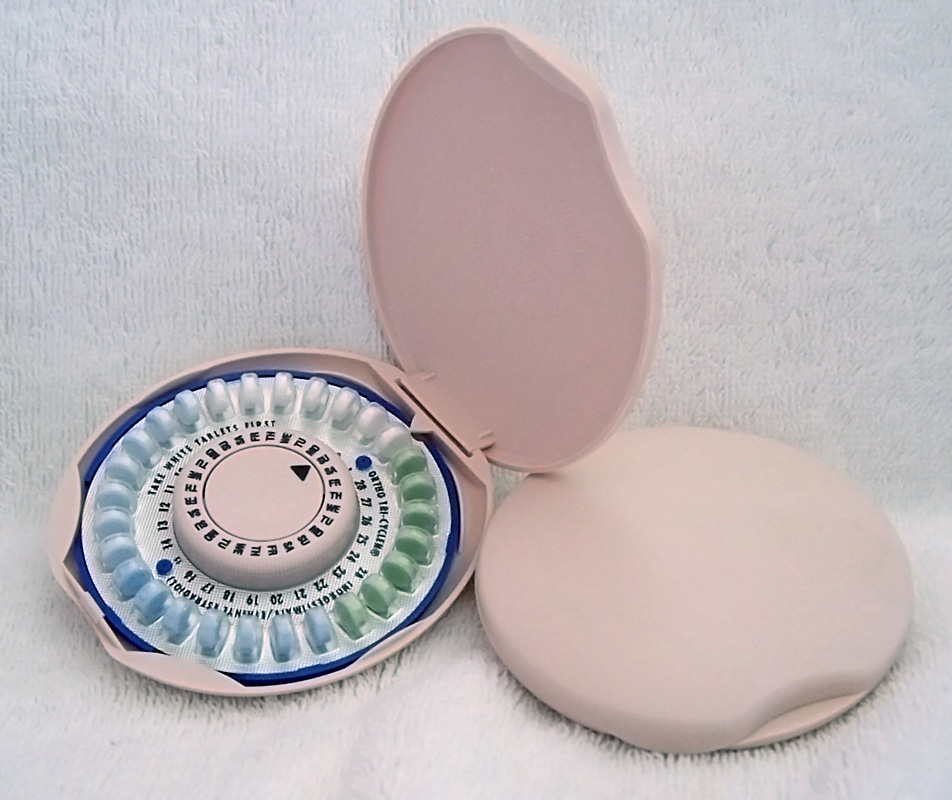
An oral contraceptive pack.

=== Oral contraceptives ===
When the birth control pill came on the market in 1960, Barbara Seaman was writing columns for women's magazines such as Brides and the Ladies' Home Journal. She launched her career as a women's health journalist and brought a new kind of health reporting to the field, writing articles that centered more on the patient and less on the medical fads of the day. Seaman was first to reveal that women lacked the information they needed to make informed decisions on child-bearing, breast-feeding, and oral contraceptives. She even went so far as to alert women to the dangers of the Pill, whose primary ingredient was estrogen (also the active ingredient in Premarin, which had contributed to the death of her aunt). Prolific output and the popularity of her published articles won Seaman membership with the prestigious Society of Magazine Writers. In 1969, Seaman completed her first book, The Doctors' Case Against the Pill, which would become the basis for the Nelson Pill Hearings on the safety of the combined oral contraceptive pill. As a result of the hearings, a health warning was added to the pill, the first informational insert for any prescription drug. Robert Finch, Secretary of HEW, praised Seaman saying, "The Doctors' Case Against the Pill... was a major factor in our strengthening the language in the final warning published in the Federal Register to be included in each package of the Pill."

=== The Jane Collective ===
Officially known as the Abortion Counseling Service of Women's Liberation, the Jane Collective, or Jane, was an underground service in Chicago, Illinois, affiliated with the Chicago Women's Liberation Union that operated from 1969 to 1973, when abortion was illegal in the United States. The collective was started by activists in the women's liberation movement in an effort to address the increasing number of unsafe abortions being performed by untrained providers. Since illegal abortions were not only dangerous but very expensive, the founding members of the collective believed that they could provide women with safer and more affordable access to abortions.

The collective originated in 1969 with University of Chicago student Heather Booth, who helped her friend's sister find an abortion provider. The founders of Jane initially focused their attention on providing women access to competent physicians willing to provide abortion services. They found a physician they called "Mike" who was willing to work with them. After creating a close relationship with Mike they found out that he actually wasn't really a physician and some Jane activists have characterized him as a "con man." However, many of the techniques he used were safe and effective. The women of Jane then decided to cut out the middleman and perform the abortions themselves. Mike taught the women how to perform dilation and curettage abortions, and from then on the women performed them themselves. During the years which Jane operated, the collective performed more than 11,000 abortions. They disbanded after Roe v. Wade made abortion legal throughout the United States in 1973.

"I'm not anti-doctor, that would only help set back attitudes on modern medical technology. Women instead have to demystify doctors by learning more about their own bodies, and can then ask questions about gynecological examinations which have never been discussed thoroughly by doctors and their patients."

— Ellen Frankfort on her book Vaginal Politics, as quoted in The Crimson in 1972.

=== Our Bodies, Ourselves ===
In 1969 at Emmanuel College in Boston, Massachusetts, at one of the first conference's for women's liberation, Nancy Miriam Hawley organized a workshop called "Women and Their Bodies." Twelve white, middle-class women between the ages of 23 and 39 attended the workshop, which allowed the women to discuss health. The discussion created a consciousness-raising environment; the strong discussion supplied the women with the necessary tools and ideas that led to the attendees organizing as "the doctors group" to research about women and healthcare. "We weren't encouraged to ask questions, but to depend on the so-called experts," Hawley told Women's eNews. "Not having a say in our own health care frustrated and angered us. We didn't have the information we needed, so we decided to find it on our own." As a result of this goal, they spent the summer researching topics they were interested in and began teaching a course titled after the workshop, based on what they had learned and written about. It contained sections on abortion, pregnancy, postpartum depression, sexuality, anatomy and physiology, sexually transmitted diseases, and critiques of patriarchy, capitalism, and the healthcare system. The book also contained information intended to guide women on "how to maneuver the American health care system, with subsections called 'The Power and Role of Male Doctors,' 'The Profit Motive in Health Care,'" 'Women as Health Care Workers,' and 'Hospitals.' They put their knowledge into an accessible format that served as a model for women who wanted to learn about themselves, communicate with doctors, and challenge the medical establishment to change and improve the health of women everywhere. They used rhetoric that avoided describing the female reproductive system as passive, unproductive, helpless, or powerless, unlike any doctor or book at the time.

Their writing was so sought after that they started selling their research as a 35-cent, 136-page booklet called Women and Their Bodies, published in 1970 by the New England Free Press. By 1973, 350,000 copies of the retitled Our Bodies, Ourselves had been sold without any formal advertising. As a result of their success, the women formed the non-profit Boston Women's Health Book Collective (which now goes by the name Our Bodies Ourselves) and published the first 276-page Our Bodies, Ourselves in 1973. The collective published it with the major publisher Simon & Schuster, only on the condition that they would have complete editorial control and that nonprofit health centers could purchase copies at a significant discount. It featured first-person stories from women, and tackled many topics then regarded as taboo.

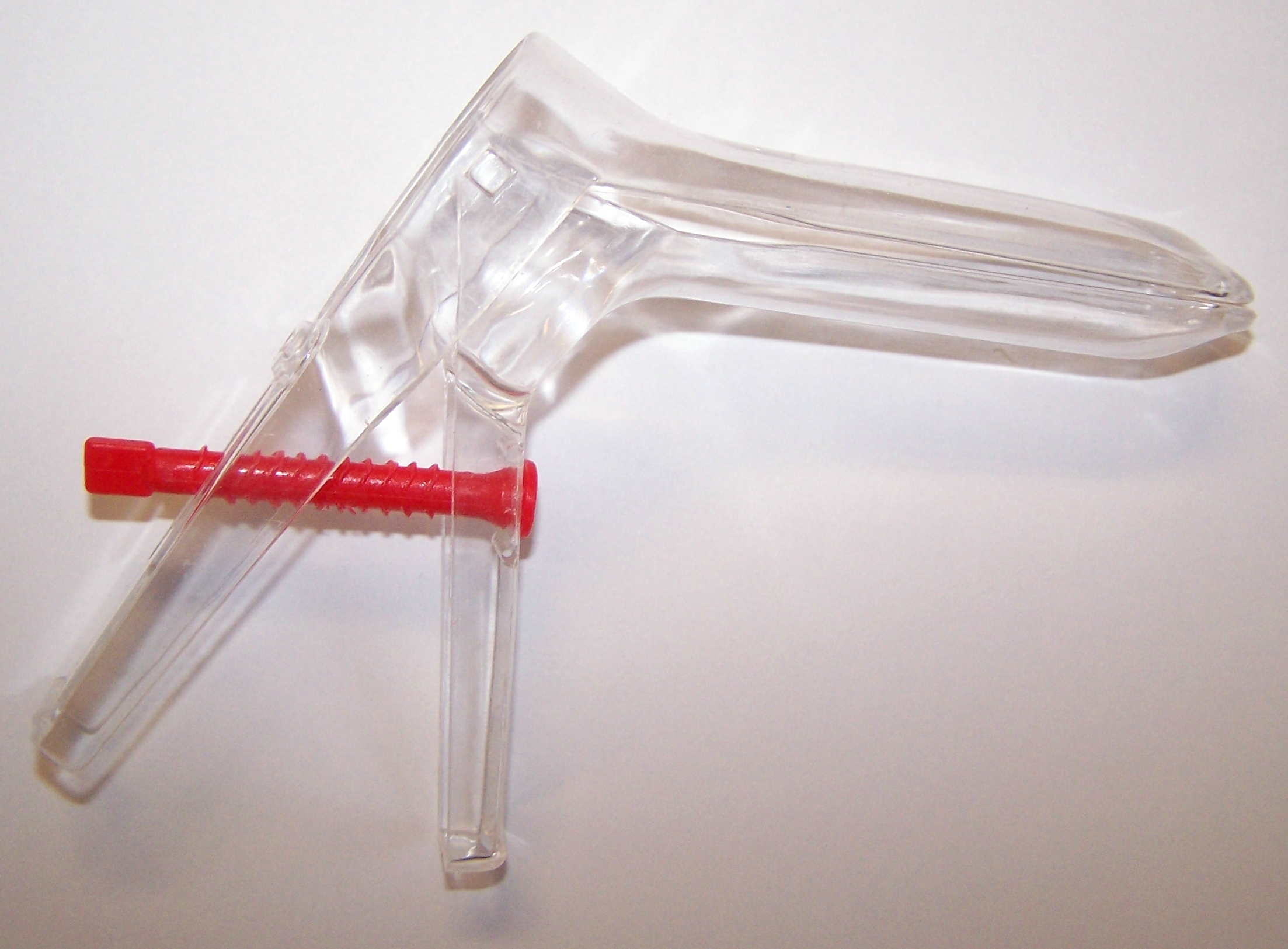
A plastic speculum.

=== Self-help gynecology ===
Carol Downer joined a NOW chapter in California in 1969, where she learned about abortions and in 1970, helped refer women to Harvey Karman's illegal abortion clinic. The Karman cannula was of particular interest to Downer, as it did not require cervical dilation, curettage, or powerful vacuum suction. Karman let them observe several abortions and an IUD insertion, during which Downer saw a woman's cervix for the first time and was "amazed" at how close and accessible it was. This inspired her interest in performing abortions and to take a speculum home to perform a cervical examination on herself.

She and other women became interested in starting their own clinic after growing displeased with the male abortion providers’ behavior towards women. On April 7, 1971, a group of women (including Downer) interested in starting their own abortion clinic met at Everywoman's Bookstore in Venice, California. Downer showed them what Karman used to perform abortions, but the women were afraid, and she knew that "until [she] demystified this for them, they were going to keep on thinking that abortion was this thing that you mostly would die of." Downer then laid down on a table in the room and performed her own cervical examination in front of all the women, who were initially surprised but then crowded around her, observing her cervix. A few women wanted to see their own cervix's as well, so they did self-exams on the table after Downer.

Lorraine Rothman also attended the meeting at the bookstore and she found Karman's device promising, but unsafe. She designed a new type of manual vacuum aspiration device, which she patented as the Del-Em, and called the process menstrual extraction (ME). ME made its debut at the National Organization for Women conference in Santa Monica, California, in August 1971. To Rothman and Downer's dismay, the organizers of the conference were "so appalled that they refused to give the women exhibit space." Instead, Downer and Rothman hung flyers around the conference, announcing a demonstration in their hotel room. The attendees were given a plastic speculum to begin their education. From the extensive mailing list collected during these demonstrations, Downer and Rothman began a national tour, going to 23 cities in the United States to teach women the new technique. This effectively began the movement of women's health self-help groups/clinics.

== 1974–1980 ==
=== National Women's Health Network ===
In 1974, Belita Cowan, Barbara Seaman, Phyllis Chesler, Mary Howell, and Alice Wolfson established the National Women's Health Network.

=== Rose Kushner's critique of radical mastectomies ===
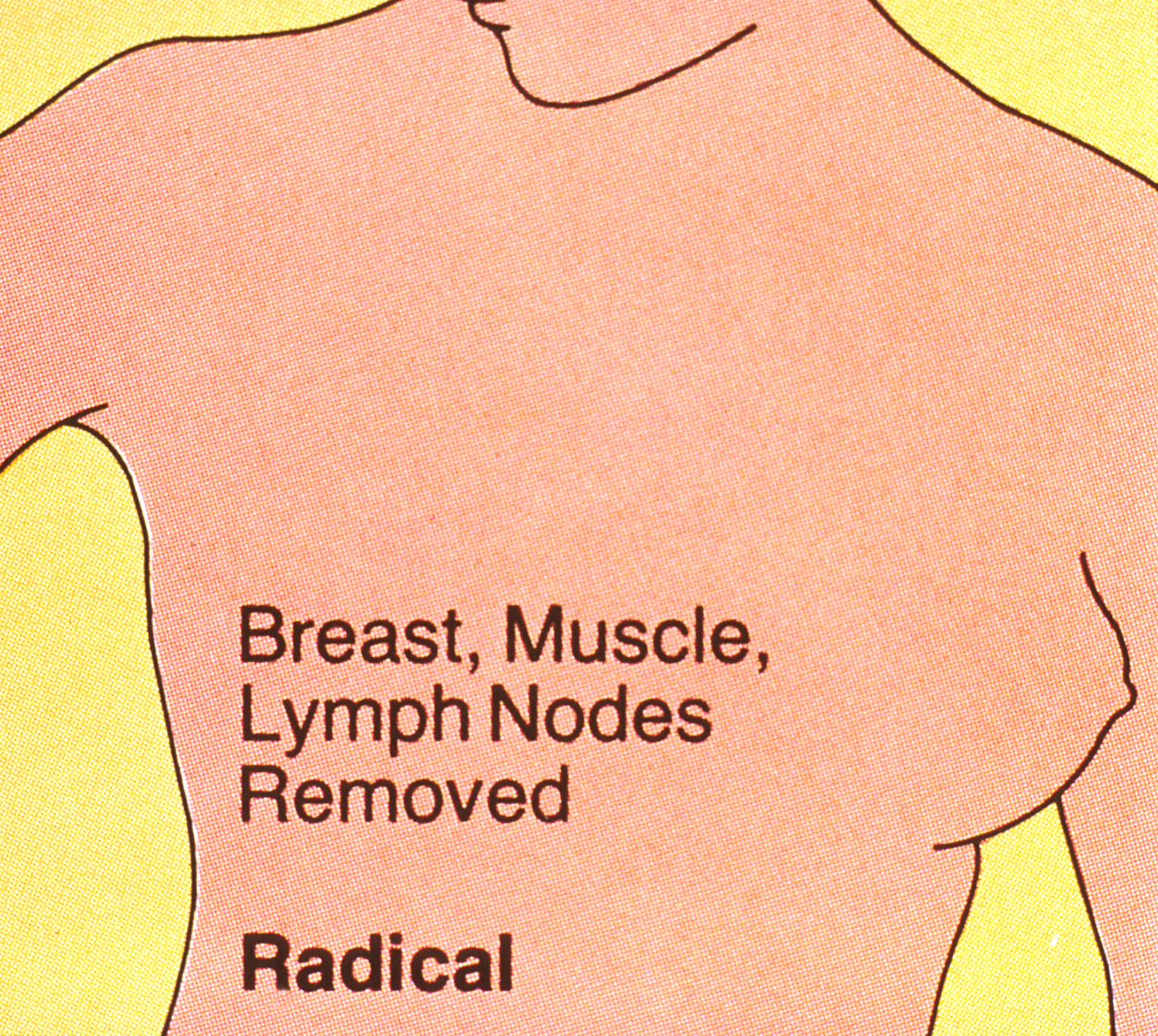
A drawing of a radical mastectomy, during which muscle, lymph nodes, and the entire breast is removed.

After being diagnosed with breast cancer, Rose Kushner objected to the treatment which was then standard, in which a tumor biopsy and radical mastectomy (which involves removing muscle tissue and lymph nodes along with the breast) were performed in a single surgical operation while the patient was under anesthesia. She had difficulty finding a doctor who would perform a diagnostic biopsy and allow her to decide what action to take next. In order to have a less invasive procedure, she had found Dr. Thomas Dao, who was willing to do a modified radical mastectomy.

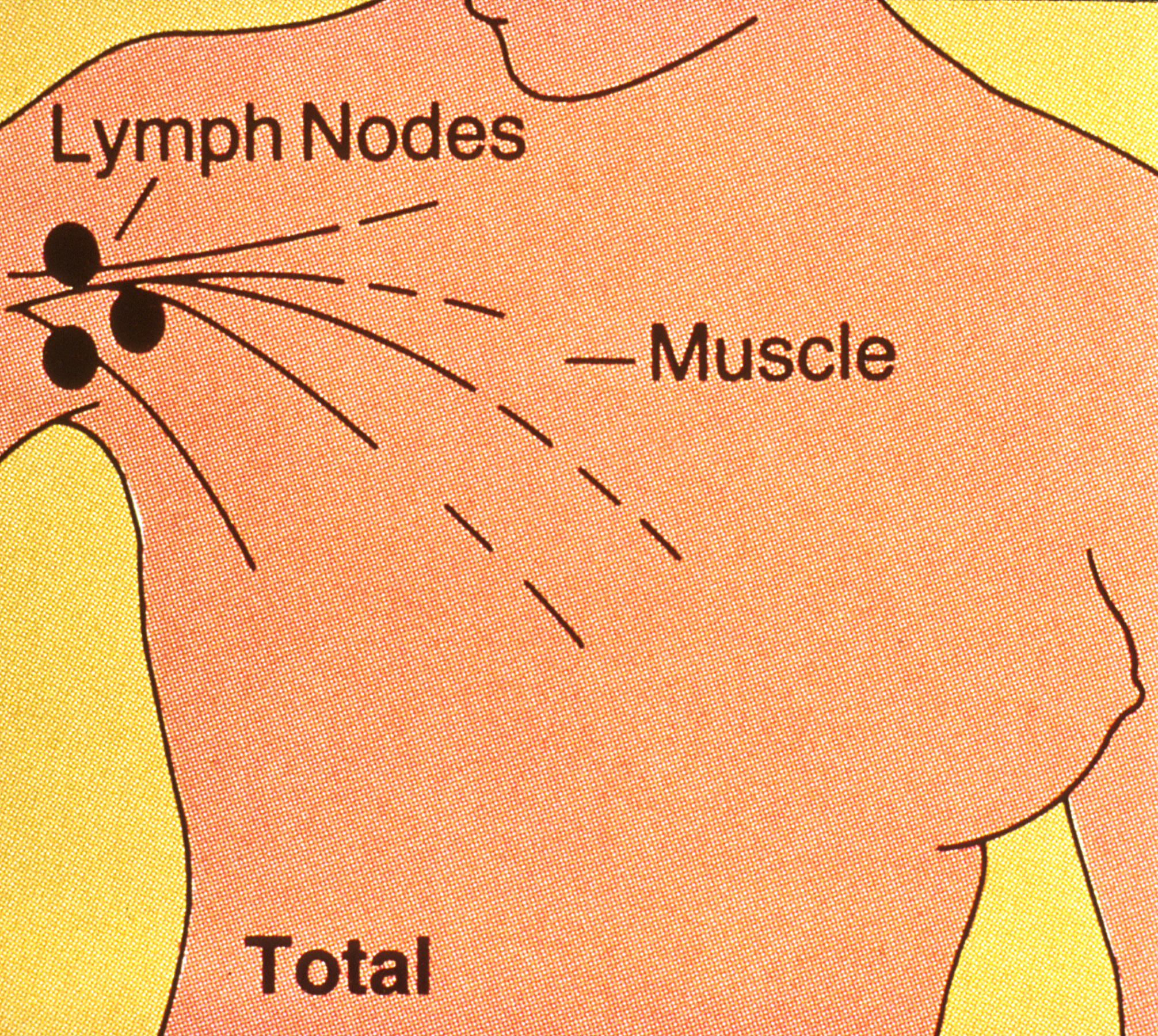
A drawing of a simple mastectomy, during which only breast tissue is removed.

As Kushner recovered from her surgery, she started writing about her experiences with breast cancer. She traveled to Europe to learn about breast cancer treatment there, finding that the radical mastectomy was not used as widely as in the United States. Upon her return home, she published Why Me?, in 1975 under the title Breast Cancer: A Personal History and Investigative Report, which contained extensive medical information and advice for patients, including strong criticism of radical mastectomies and the practice of performing a biopsy and a mastectomy as a one-step surgical procedure. Her critique of prevalent breast cancer treatment included strong feminist themes, such "No man is going to make another impotent while he's asleep without his permission, but there's no hesitation if it's a woman's breast." The book was strongly endorsed by Dr. Dao, but it was widely criticized by other doctors and the American Cancer Society. Kusher became a relentless critic of the treatment of breast cancer by the medical profession. She attended numerous meetings of medical professionals, interrupting presentations, questioning conclusions, and speaking against the prevalent practices of one-step breast cancer surgery and radical mastectomy. In 1975 she was "booed off the stage" at a meeting of the Society of Surgical Oncology, whose members objected to her challenges to traditional treatments.

In 1975 Kushner and Dorothy Johnston, established a telephone hotline called the Breast Cancer Advisory Center, based in Kensington, Maryland, that operated until 1982, responding to calls and letters from thousands of women wanting information about breast cancer and its treatment. The center's establishment was motivated in part by Kushner's desire to promote patient self-help and mutual support, thus displacing the medical profession and the American Cancer Society from their roles as information "gatekeepers".

In spite of her unpopularity with the mainstream medical profession, Kushner's work was well received in the public and won increasing respect in official circles. In June 1977, she was the only lay member appointed to a ten-member National Institutes of Health (NIH) panel that evaluated treatment options for primary breast cancer. In 1979, the panel issued its findings, concluding that the Halsted radical mastectomy should no longer be the standard treatment for suspected cases of breast cancer, instead recommending total simple mastectomy as the primary surgical treatment. Additionally, Kushner convinced her fellow panel members to include a statement calling for an end to the one-step surgical procedure. At the time of her death, Dr. Bruce A. Chabner of the National Cancer Institute said she was "probably the single most important person" in ending the practice of one-step surgery for breast cancer, because of her persistence and because she brought medical information to a wide public audience that otherwise might have remained unaware of the options.

== Challenging sexism in medicine ==
=== In medical schools ===
Two laws in the United States lifted restrictions for women in the medical field -- Title IX of the Higher Education Act Amendments of 1972 and the Public Health Service Act of 1975, banning discrimination on grounds of gender. In November 1970, the Assembly of the Association of American Medical Colleges rallied for equal rights in the medical field.

The 1970s marked a great increase of women entering and graduating from medical school in the United States. From 1930 to 1970, a period of 40 years, about 14,000 women graduated from medical school. From 1970 to 1980, a period of 10 years, over 20,000 women graduated from medical school. This increase of women in the medical field was due to both political and cultural changes.

One study surveyed physician mothers and their physician daughters in order to analyze the effect that discrimination and harassment have on the individual and their career. This study included 84% of physician mothers that graduated medical school prior to 1970, with the majority of these physicians graduating in the 1950s and 1960s. The authors of this study stated that discrimination in the medical field persisted after the title VII discrimination legislation was passed in 1965. According to this study, one third of physician daughters reported experiencing a form of gender discrimination in medical school, field training, and the work environment. This study also stated that both generations equally experienced gender discrimination within their work environments.

This article provided an overview on the history of gender discrimination, claiming that gender initiated the systematic exclusion of women from medical schools. This was the case until 1970, when the National Organization for Women (NOW) filed a class action lawsuit against all medical schools in the United States. More specifically, this lawsuit was successful in forcing medical schools to comply to the civil rights legislation. This success was seen by 1975 when the number of women in medicine had nearly tripled, and continued to grow as the years progressed. By 2005, over 25% of physicians and around 50% of medical school students were women. The increase of women in medicine also came with an increase of women identifying as a racial/ethnic minority, yet this population is still largely underrepresented in comparison to the general population of the medical field. Within this specific study, 22% of physician mothers and 24% of physician daughters identified themselves as being an ethnic minority. These women reported experiencing instances of exclusion from career opportunities as a result of their race and gender.

=== Between doctors and female patients ===
A sharp increase of women in the medical field led to developments in doctor patient relationships, changes in terminology, and theory. With higher numbers of women enrolled in medical school, medical practices like gynecology were challenged and changed. One area of medical practice that was challenged and changed was gynecology. Wendy Kline discusses the blurring of the medical and sexual that occurred in the medical field in the late 40s into the 60s, particularly in gynecology. Kline says that "to ensure that young brides were ready for the wedding night, they [doctors] used the pelvic exam as a form of sex instruction." In Ellen Frankfort's book Vaginal Politics, Frankfort talks about the "shame" and "humiliation" felt during a pap test; "I was naked, he was dressed; I was lying down, he was standing up; I was quiet, he was giving orders." One medical student is quoted in Kline's book as saying, "Since I experienced my own exams as a humiliating procedure, I feared inflicting the same humiliation on another person." In 1972 the University of Iowa Medical School instituted a new training program for pelvic and breast examinations. Students would act both as the doctor and the patient, allowing each student to understand the procedure and create a more gentle, respectful examination. This method was quite different from the previous practice in which doctors were taught to assert their power over patients. With changes in ideologies and practices throughout the 70s, by 1980 over 75 schools had adopted this new method.

== Legacy ==
Tanfer Emin Tunc argues that the Army of Three, the Jane collective, and Downer and Rothman's menstrual extraction technique have contributed to abortion technology in America.

== Timeline ==
- 1968
- 1969
  - The Jane Collective begins referring women to illegal abortion providers.
- 1970
  - January: Congress meets for the Nelson Pill Hearings.
- 1971
  - April 7th: Carol Downer performs a cervical self-examination in front of a group of women, effectively starting the movement of women's health self-help groups/clinics.
- 1972
  - September: Carol Downer and Colleen Wilson are arrested for practicing medicine without a license after helping to insert yogurt into another woman's vagina.
- 1973
  - January 22nd: Roe v. Wade liberalizes abortion laws.
  - The Jane Collective disbands.
  - Our Bodies, Ourselves is published by mainstream publisher Simon & Schuster.
- 1974
  - The National Women's Health Network is created.
- 1975
  - Rose Kushner publishes Why Me?, raising awareness about the overuse of radical mastectomies in breast cancer treatments.
- 1976
- 1977
  - The Hyde Amendment is enacted, barring the use of federal funds to pay for abortion except to save the life of the woman, or if the pregnancy arises from incest or rape.
- 1978
  - The Pregnancy Discrimination Act is enacted.
- 1979
- 1980
- 1981
- 1982
- 1983
- 1984
- 1985
- 1986
- 1987
- 1988
- 1989
- 1990
  - Society for the Advancement of Women's Health Research (Now Society for Women's Health Research) is created by Dr. Florence Pat Haseltine in 1990.
- 1991
  - US Department of Health and Human Services' Office on Women's Health is created.
  - April 19th: Dr. Bernadine Healy, the first woman appointed as director of the National Institutes of Health, announces the Women's Health Initiative.
- 1992
  - Journal of Women's Health is established.
- 1993
  - February 5th, Family and Medical Leave Act of 1993 is enacted.
  - September 13th, the Violence Against Women Act is enacted.
- 1994
  - The Mammography Quality Standards Act is enacted.

== Media ==
=== List of associated media ===
==== Periodicals ====
- The Monthly Extract. (Lolly and Jeanne Hirsch) 1974-1978.
- Health Right. (Women's Health Forum) 1975.
- Women and Health. (SUNY at Old Westbury) 1976.
- The Newsalert. (National Women's Health Network) 1976.

==== Books ====
- Chesler, Phyllis (1972). Women and Madness. New York: Avon Books.
- Frankfort, Ellen. Vaginal Politics.
- Haire, Doris (1972). "The Cultural Warping of Childbirth". Icea News. 11 (1). Seattle: International Childbirth Education Association: 5–35. PMID 12261812.
- Seaman, Barbara (1972). Free and Female. Greenwich: Fawcett Crest.
- Boston Women's Health Book Collective (1973). Our Bodies, Ourselves. Simon & Schuster.
- Ehrenreich, Barbara; English, Deirdre (1973). Complaints and Disorders: The Sexual Politics of Sickness.
- A New View of a Woman's Body. Federation of Feminist Women's Health Centers.
- How to Stay Out of the Gynecologists Office. Federation of Feminist Women's Health Centers.
- Rich, Adrienne (1976). Of Woman Born. New York: W. W. Norton and Co.
- Dreifus, Claudia, ed. (1977). Seizing Our Bodies: The Politics of Women's Health. New York: Vintage Books. ISBN 978-0394723600.
- Kushner, Rose (1977). Why Me? What Every Woman Should Know About Breast Cancer To Save Her Life. New York: New American Library. ISBN 9780451076922.
- Walsh, Mary Roth (1977). Doctors Wanted: No Women Need Apply: Sexual barriers in the medical profession, 1835-1975. New Haven, Connecticut: Yale University Press.
- Ehrenreich, Barbara; English, Deirdre (1978). For Her Own Good: Two Centuries of the Experts' Advice to Women.
- Ehrenreich, John, ed. (1978). The Cultural Crisis of Modern Medicine. New York: Monthly Review Press.
- Kushner, Rose (1985), Alternatives: New Developments in the War Against Breast Cancer, Warner Books. ISBN 0446345873, ISBN 978-0-446-34587-3, ISBN 0-446-34587-3
- Downer, Carol; Chalker, Rebecca (1992). A Woman's Book of Choices. Four Walls Eight Windows.

==== Essays, articles, and pamphlets ====
- Koedt, Anne (1970). The Myth of the Vaginal Orgasm (PDF). Somerville, Massachusetts: New England Free Press. OCLC 2393445.
- Weisstein, Naomi (1971). Psychology Constructs the Female (PDF). Somerville, Massachusetts: New England Free Press.
- Ehrenreich, Barbara; English, Deirdre (1972). Witches, Midwives, and Nurses: A History of Women Healers (PDF). Somerville, Massachusetts: New England Free Press.
- Dodson, Betty (1972). Liberating Masturbation (PDF). Union, New Jersey: Sensory Research Corp. Archived from the original (PDF) on May 22, 2011.
- Kushner, Rose (1984), Is Aggressive Adjuvant Chemotherapy the Halsted Radical of the '80s?, CA Cancer J Clin 1984; 34:345-351. doi:10.3322/canjclin.34.6.345

==== Documentaries ====
- La Operación
- No Going Back: A Pro-Choice Perspective (Documentary). Produced by Carol Downer, directed by Irene Schonwit, written by Regina Leeds. 1988.- Video which presents menstrual extraction as an abortion method that can be used by women in self-help health groups.

== Notable people ==
=== Notable activists ===
- Charon Asetoyer
- Byllye Avery
- Heather Booth
- Phyllis Chesler
- Belita Cowan
- Carol Downer
- Laura Eldridge
- Merle Hoffman
- Mary Howell
- Rose Kushner
- Judy Norsigian
- Loretta Ross
- Barbara Seaman
- Norma Meras Swenson
- Lorraine Rothman
- Naomi Weisstein
- Alice Wolfson

== See also ==
- Death of Amber Nicole Thurman
- Death of Chaniece Wallace
- Death of Sha-Asia Washington
