= Feminist Abortion Network =

US consortium of abortion care providers

The Feminist Abortion Network (FAN) is a national consortium of independent, feminist, not-for-profit abortion care providers. Although more than fifty such health care providers once existed, today fourteen clinics remain in operation. FAN was formed in 2006 to promote information-sharing, cross-organizational strategizing and improve the overall efficacy and reach of the member clinics.

== History ==
Most of the FAN member clinics were founded in the mid- to late-1970s and were inspired by the self-help movement. All of the clinics opened after the decision of the Supreme Court case Roe v. Wade, which ruled that women had the constitutional right to access abortion. In addition to providing abortions, these clinics were committed to providing their clients with the knowledge necessary to participate in decisions about their own health care. Some of the clinics were even borne out of groups of women practicing self-help health care, using mirrors and speculums to examine their own cervixes.

Throughout the 1970s and 1980s, the member clinics and activists throughout the country participated in the women's health movement, changing the way that women receive health care services in the United States. The women's health movement has been credited with changing the health care landscape in a number of ways, including:

- Making pregnancy tests available over-the-counter
- Requiring informational package inserts on all prescription medications (including oral contraceptives and hormone replacement therapy)
- Allowing a partner or support person to be present during a medical appointment as the patient's advocate
- Expanding and advocating for the practice of informed consent

Despite the many gains of the women's health movement, independent abortion clinics have faced myriad struggles throughout their existence. Many FAN clinics have been firebombed, clinic employees have been threatened, clients have been harassed by protesters, and high-profile murders of abortion providers such as Dr. George Tiller have created challenges and fears for abortion providers. In addition to security concerns, many independent clinics face financial struggles because they provide abortion services to all women who seek them. Some of these costs are offset by abortion funds, but many clinics still struggle to remain operational. Independent clinics may also face competition from larger abortion care providers, such as Planned Parenthood. When the Yakima branch of the Cedar River Clinics closed its doors in 2010 after thirty years of operation, it cited the expansion of the Yakima Planned Parenthood's services to include first- and second-trimester abortions as playing a critical role in their inability to remain open.

In addition to the ongoing struggles that the FAN clinics have faced since the 1970s, many states and state legislatures are currently hostile to abortion rights. In recent years, legislators across the fifty states have been introducing legislation that would restrict abortion access at an unprecedented rate. In 2011 alone, legislators across the country introduced over 1,100 reproductive rights-related provisions. One hundred and thirty five of these provisions passed in 36 states, exceeding the 89 provisions passed in the previous year and the 77 passed in 2009.

The FAN member clinics remain committed to staying open, despite the challenges, because they believe that they offer an important alternative to "standard" healthcare. Kudra MacCalleich of the Concord Feminist Health Center framed the need for feminist health centers in terms of biodiversity: "Why is biodiversity so crucial? Because we know there are significant negative consequences when a species is lost, and that once we lose it, there is high improbability that we will ever get it back. I think there is a critical role to be played by the diverse and distinct types of providers we still have in our 'health care ecosystem' and that we should consider what might be the consequences of their disappearance and absorption into the corporate conglomerate."

In the decades that they have been open, many of the FAN clinics have expanded their services beyond abortion and gynecological care. Many, such as the Blue Mountain Clinic in Missoula, Montana, now offer services to men, ranging from STI testing to more comprehensive health care services. Others, such as the Feminist Women's Health Center in Atlanta, continue to offer health care only to women, but have expanded their services with fertility treatments, trauma survivor sensitive care, and gynecological health care for trans men. The Women's Health Specialists of California offer a "Teen Care-A-Van" that travels throughout Sacramento County to provide STI testing services and information regarding sexual health to local youth.

In an interview with reproductive health news source RH Reality Check, two women from FAN member clinics (Kudra MacCaillech of the Concord Feminist Health Center and Joan Schrammeck of Cedar River Clinics) discussed the formation of the consortium. MacCaillech says of the initial idea, "I can't say what inspired the "click" to connect, but that's exactly what it felt like. It was exciting, but also very focused and coordinated. Initially, we were brainstorming ways to collaborate on projects and funding; projects that had not only the potential to impact the clinics in our own states and communities – but every FWHC across the entire country." Member clinics would be non-profit, independent, have a feminist philosophy and be committed to providing abortions.

Before forming FAN, the women conducted a survey to find out how many feminist abortion care providers still existed – and were alarmed by the number that had closed. Since forming FAN, two more feminist clinics have closed: Aradia Women's Health in Seattle, WA and A Woman's Choice Clinic in Oakland, CA.

== Goals ==
The self-stated goals of the consortium are:

- Exposing fake abortion clinics (also known as crisis pregnancy centers)
- Overturning the Hyde Amendment
- Retaining a commitment to providing women with abortions, regardless of financial status or insurance
- Continue to work with allied organizations, such as NARAL, Feminist Majority Foundation, and the National Abortion Federation
- Participate in health care reform implementation to ensure that women's needs are being met
- Continue to engage with allied social justice movements, such as domestic violence prevention

== Member clinics ==
Listed in alphabetical order:

- Blue Mountain Clinic in Missoula, Montana
- Cedar River Clinics in Renton and Tacoma, Washington
- Concord Feminist Health Center in Concord, New Hampshire
- Emma Goldman Clinic in Iowa City, Iowa
- Feminist Women's Health Center in Atlanta, Georgia
- Joan G. Lovering Health Center in Portsmouth, New Hampshire
- Mabel Wadsworth Women's Health Center in Bangor, Maine
- Choices: Memphis Center for Reproductive Health in Memphis, Tennessee
- Preterm in Cleveland, Ohio
- Trust Women Foundation in Wichita, Kansas; Oklahoma City, Oklahoma; Seattle, Washington
- Women's Health - Boulder Valley Women's Health Center in Boulder, Colorado
- Women's Health Center of West Virginia in Charleston, West Virginia
- WE Health Clinic in Duluth, Minnesota
- Women's Health Specialists of California in Sacramento, Chico, Redding and Santa Rosa, California

== Bibliography ==
- Kline, Wendy (2010). Bodies of Knowledge: Sexuality, Reproduction, and Women's Health in the Second Wave. Chicago: University of Chicago. ISBN 978-0226443089.
- Morgen, Sandra (2002). Into Our Own Hands: The Women's Health Movement in the United States, 1969-1990. New Brunswick, NJ: Rutgers University Press. ISBN 978-0813530710.
