= Nelson Pill Hearings =

U.S. Congress hearings

In 1970, Barbara Seaman brought the dangers of combined oral contraceptive pill use to the attention of Senator Gaylord Nelson with her book The Doctors Case Against the Pill. Nelson, who at the time was also busy organizing the first Earth Day, called Senate hearings in January 1970 to investigate the problems Seaman's book addressed—that many women experienced severe side effects such as decreased sex drive, weight gain, heart problems, blood clots, and depression, but did not know that oral contraceptives were the cause.

Barbara Seaman, Alice Wolfson, and other women who had been involved in abortion demonstrations, decided to attend the hearings on Capitol Hill. At the hearings, these women were struck by the complete absence of testimony from anyone who had actually taken the pill, as only men testified on the safety of the pill.

During the proceedings, Wolfson jumped up and asked why no women were testifying. The media immediately turned its focus onto her. She demanded that women's experiences be taken into testimony. She also shouted, "Why is there no pill for men?" and "Why are 10 million women being used as guinea pigs?" And, " Why had you assured the drug companies that they could testify? Why have you told them that they could get top priority? They're not taking the pills, we are!" When Senator Nelson stated, "We are not going to permit the, uh, proceedings to be interrupted in this way... If you ladies would, ah...sit down..." Wolfson replied, "I don't think the hearings are any more important than our lives."

At the hearings, Wolfson met Barbara Seaman. During the remainder of the Nelson pill hearings, the two women organized other women to position themselves in the audience and to protest outside Congress, where they announced their concerns about the pill. They also decided to create a nationwide network to educate women about potentially harmful side effects of the pill. As a result of the Nelson pill hearings, a pamphlet outlining risks and side effects was required in every pill packet. After the hearings, Seaman and Wolfson were joined by Phyllis Chesler, Belita Cowan, and Mary Howell, and together they founded the National Women's Health Network.
