= Feminist Women's Health Center =

Health center in Atlanta, Georgia, US

The Feminist Women's Health Center of Atlanta is a feminist health center that provides comprehensive gynecological health care, engages in community outreach, and advocates for reproductive justice. Kwajelyn Jackson has served as the executive director since 2018.

== History ==
The Feminist Women's Health Center (FWHC) was founded in 1977. FWHC was born out of self-help groups; these clinics were known for empowering women to make decisions about their healthcare. To increase accessibility of health care resources and services, especially among women of color, the development of women's health centers emerged in the late 20th century. These health centers "provide primary care to women, including reproductive care, pregnancy and childbirth care, breast cancer programs, and other essential services, with easy access to specialists when they are needed".

The Atlanta Feminist Women's Health Center is one of several extant feminist health centres in the United States. It was a member clinic of the Federation of Feminist Women's Health Centres (FFWHC). The Federation of Feminist Women's Health Centres originated in Los Angeles, and subsequent member clinics opened throughout California, Tallahassee, Florida, Atlanta, and Georgia. Women's health movement historian Sandra Morgen notes, "Until the National Black Women's Health Project... in the 1980s, the FFWHC was the only multiple-site group in the larger women's health movement." All member clinics provided abortion and gynaecological health care, and worked together to "espouse a unified ideology and identifiable politics."

The FFWHC member clinics adopted a more hierarchal model as other feminist clinics operated as collectives. The debate and dispute over the FFWHC's mode of operation reached a point where some women's health centres refused to refer clients to FFWHC clinics for abortions. In 1990, Carol Downer, founder of the Los Angeles FWHC and leader in the women's health movement, responded to the controversy, "Most of the criticisms I've heard revolve around hierarchy... I might say it was the difference between being organised and disorganised... It's hard for me to understand why anyone who goes into a political arena doesn't want to be as organised as they can possibly be... if you really are serious about what you are doing. Because otherwise you are the mercy of these larger forces which are organized."

A few years after moving their headquarters to Eugene, Oregon, the costs of operating the FFWHC offices proved too expensive. Although the member clinics stay in touch, they are no longer formally connected as a federation. However, most of these clinics, including the Atlanta FWHC, are now part of a new consortium of women's health care providers, the Feminist Abortion Network.

== Health services ==
The Feminist Women's Health Center offers a variety of sexual and reproductive health care programs, designed to reach historically underserved populations within the Atlanta community.

=== Abortion ===
FWHC provides both surgical and medication abortions in their Atlanta clinic. In 2017, and 2018, FWHC performed abortions on 3,867 patients, including patients surviving trauma and dealing with fetal anomalies.

=== Sexual health and wellness ===
FWHC offers annual wellness exams, pregnancy testing, miscarriage care, birth control and emergency contraception options, sexually transmitted infection screening and treatment, and HIV testing and counseling. In 2017, and 2018, FWHC provided these services to 1,074 patients.

=== Trans Health Initiative ===
The Feminist Women's Health Center began offering health services to trans-masculine individuals in 2000. The Trans Health Initiative was founded in the memory of Robert Eads, a partially transitioned trans man who died of ovarian cancer at the age of 53 after being denied medical care.

=== Donor insemination ===
The donor insemination program began at the Feminist Women's Health Center in 1988. The program began because most infertility specialists in the southern United States were only willing to offer their services to married women, leaving single heterosexual women and lesbians unable to access fertility treatments. In a 1990 profile of the program, an employee of the center noted that only about 5% of the women seeking donor insemination were married, and about a third of the program's clients were lesbians. In 2012, about 90% of clients identified as lesbians.

In 2014, with fertility services and clinics more widely available, FWHC ended the donor insemination program to refocus efforts and resources on other services.

== Legislative advocacy ==
Feminist Women's Health Center has formally advocated for legal access to abortion and healthcare at the local and state level for more than 20 years. FWHC engages a full-time lobbyist at the state Capitol, mobilizes community members for action alerts, coordinates advocacy days where volunteers can learn about the politics of reproductive justice and lobby their state legislators, and educates on laws relevant to reproductive justice and legislative process, including voter engagement.

=== Lawsuit challenging Georgia abortion ban ===
On May 7, 2019, Georgia Governor Brian Kemp signed Georgia House Bill 481, a six-week abortion ban which was to take effect on January 1, 2020.

In June 2019, the American Civil Liberties Union, the American Civil Liberties Union of Georgia, the Center for Reproductive Rights, and Planned Parenthood filed a lawsuit in the United States District Court for the Northern District of Georgia on behalf of several reproductive justice advocates and abortion providers, including Feminist Women's Health Center. Although initially enjoined by Judge Steve C. Jones in July 2020, the United States Court of Appeals for the Eleventh Circuit allowed the law to take effect in June 2022 in light of Dobbs v. Jackson Women's Health Organization.

=== Walk in My Shoes, Hear Our Voice ===
On March 12, 2012, the Feminist Women's Health Center organized a protest at the Georgia State Capitol, along with a wide range coalition partners that included ACLU – Georgia and SisterSong Reproductive Justice Collective. The protest was in response to a spate of legislation that would restrict Georgia women's access to reproductive health care, ranging from religious exemptions for birth control coverage to a twenty-week abortion ban. Over five hundred people showed up to the protest, which was organized around the principles that women have a right to:

- Determine when and whether to have children
- Have a healthy pregnancy and birth
- Become a parent and parent with dignity
- Have safe and healthy relationships and families

== Community engagement ==
Like other feminist health centers, Feminist Women's Health Center recognizes that access to health care is closely linked with politics and other social factors. As a result, FWHC has a community engagement and advocacy department in addition to providing health care at their clinic. FWHC's community engagement has transpired through a variety of programs designed to serve specific populations, including Black women, refugees, queer women, men, and young leaders. Today, the clinic engages volunteers and hosts a reproductive justice book club, in addition to key programs, the Lifting Latinx Voices initiative and the Errin J. Vuley Fellows Program.

The Lifting Latinx Voices Initiative is a health outreach program that strives to empower and educate the Latinx community in addition to addressing health disparities that impact Latinx people. Using the community leadership model of promotores de salud from Latin American countries, the initiative offers open and safe spaces to discuss reproductive health and address specific needs and barriers.

The Errin J. Vuley Fellows Program was launched in 2017 to support community leaders in building skills and knowledge through a reproductive justice framework. Named for FWHC's first community engagement coordinator, the fellowship focuses especially on Vuley's advocacy for abortion access, trans justice and racial justice. Through monthly workshops and retreats, fellows learn from each other and community organizations, setting them up for futures in movement work.

== See also ==
- Black Women's Health Imperative, formerly the National Black Women's Health Project
