= Andrea Bowers =

American visual artist

- Born: 1965 (age 60–61); Wilmington, Ohio, United States
- Education: California Institute of the Arts, Bowling Green State University
- Patrons: Otis College of Art and Design

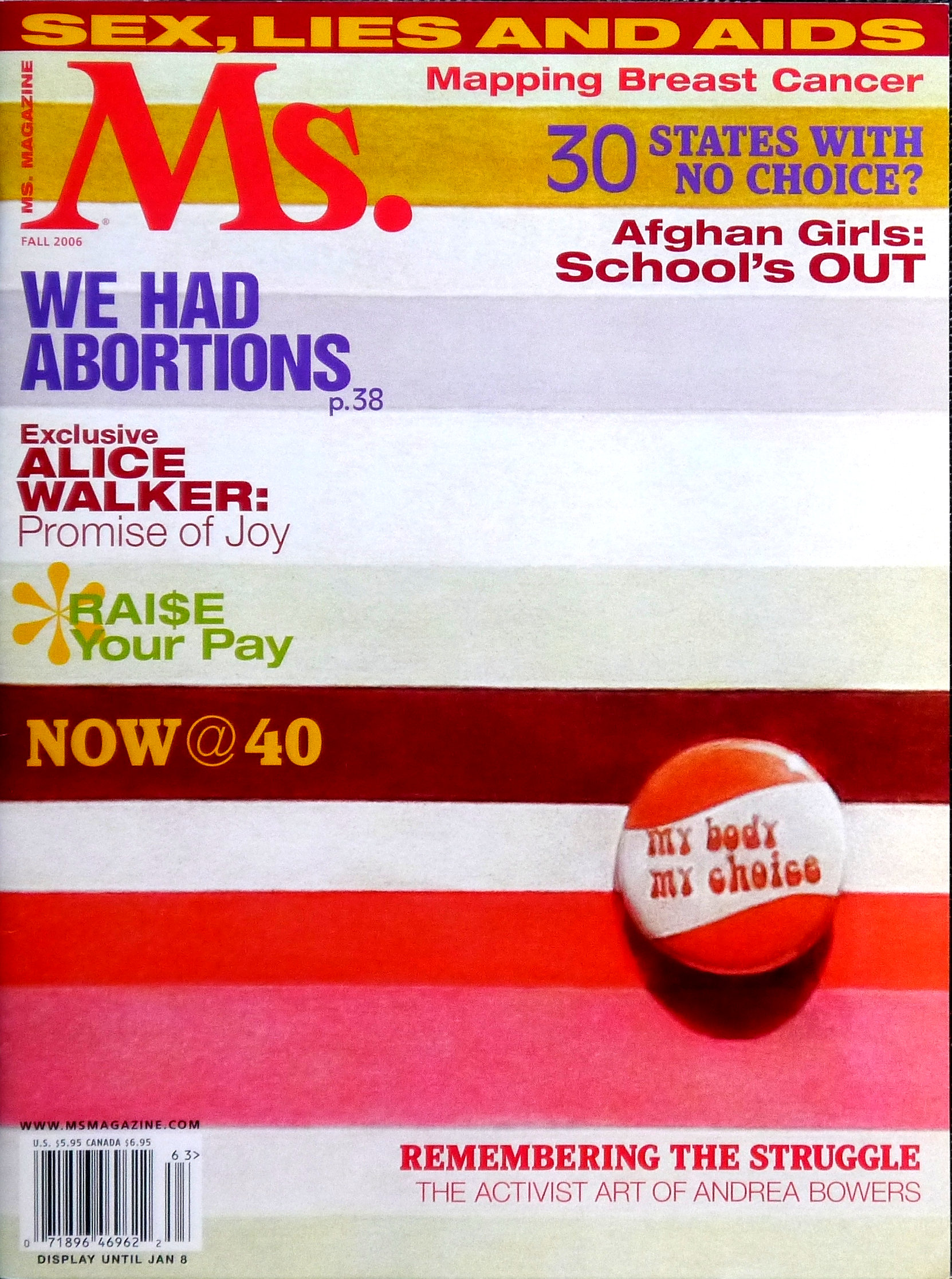
Fall 2006 issue of Ms. magazine featuring the art of Andrea Bowers

Andrea Bowers (born 1965), is an American artist working in a variety of media including video, drawing, and installation. Her work has been exhibited around the world, including museums and galleries in Germany, Greece, and Tokyo. Her work was included in the 2004 Whitney Biennial and 2008 California Biennial. She is on the graduate faculty at Otis College of Art and Design, and is Los Angeles–based.

== Early life and education ==
Andrea was born in Wilmington, Ohio, and grew up in "an apolitical Republican family." Bowers holds an MFA degree from California Institute of the Arts where she got involved with a group of classmates and teachers which caused her to become more socially and politically active. She also holds a BFA degree from Bowling Green State University, Bowling Green, Ohio. By the early 1990s, the Feminist Art Program at California Institute of the Arts was diminishing during the same time Bowers was close to receiving her MFA in 1992. Bowers saw this motion as historically forgetting previous successful women in art. She decided to then maintain historical record of artistic and political movements through her own future art.

== Work ==
As a feminist and social activist, Bowers' work addresses contemporary political issues such as immigration, environmental activism, and women's and worker's rights, within the larger context of American history and protest movements. Bowers regularly invites people who have a stake in the issues that concern her to enter the gallery spaces where she exhibits and directly engage with art world regulars. Examples of this include a series of activist events that took place at Susanne Vielmetter, and her decision to link the opening reception for her show "Mercy Mercy Me" (2009) at Andrew Kreps with an international day of action proposed by climate activist organization 350.org. Bowers also continues to make a series of drawings based on photos of women taken at immigrant rights marches, feminist rallies, gay rights protests, and environmental activism in which the subjects are rendered in isolation on large sheets of otherwise blank paper. In Girlfriends (May Day March, Los Angeles, 2011) a feeling of isolation and vulnerability due to the subjects being out of context is particularly strong.

Bowers embraces her mediums such as drawings, video, photography, and sketches for them being seen as nontraditional. For example, vinyl and graphite were seen as lesser, economically cheaper, and more feminized art mediums. In the 1970s and 1980s, a feminist art movement spread amongst artists over the refusal to work with the medium of oil paints to portray their own political imagery. Bowers tediously seeks out information in older news articles, films and photos to create photorealistic pieces based upon historical events and people.

Her work was included in the 2024 exhibition Making Their Mark: Works from the Shah Garg Collection at the Berkeley Art Museum and Pacific Film Archive (BAMPFA).

=== Vieja Gloria ===
Vieja Gloria (2003) describes the clash between activist John Quigley and Los Angeles County authorities over the proposed removal of "Old Glory," a 400-year-old oak located in Valencia, California. Quigley later convinced Bowers to undergo training in tree climbing and occupation, which she documented in the video Nonviolent Civil Disobedience Training-Tree Sitting Forest Defense (2009). In 2011 she took part in a tree sit in Arcadia, which she also documented. The tree sitting protest helped Bowers to broaden her understanding of her own art and politics.

=== Sanctuary ===
Sanctuary (2007) is a film that comments on the ways marginalized people create spaces of refuge against overwhelming cultural and political forces. The silent film features Elvira Arellano, an undocumented immigrant who sought refuge in Chicago's Adalberto United Methodist Church. (Arellano and her eight-year-old son were eventually arrested and deported just three weeks after Bowers met with her).

=== Circle ===
Circle (2009) is a video that depicts four generations of women from the Native Alaskan Gwich’in people speak about their ambivalent relationship with other, non-local, activists against oil drilling in the Arctic National Wildlife Refuge. Shots of a vast Arctic landscape suggest that petty differences may mean little in the context of the immensity that unites them. Bowers' focus on individual voices humanizes what might otherwise read as petty squabbling in the face of enormous challenges.

=== Your Donations Do Our Work ===
Your Donations Do Our Work (2009) was a two-month project created alongside feminist colleague Suzanne Lacy.Your Donations Do Our Work was an exhibition where a community thrift store located in University of California, Riverside Sweeney Art Gallery, aimed to collect undesired items from the members of the community. These donated items would then be refurbished by volunteers and distributed to a “barter-system like store” in Laton, California where Master of Fine Arts students attending Otis College exchanged these renovated items with consumers for community organization work. Bowers and Lacy stated that their real goal was to observe what “gender, labor, class, and race” seem like on a more personal community level. The idea of integration between multigenerational feminists lead to the construction of this collaboration.

=== The United States v. Tim DeChristopher ===
In this video (2010) Bowers depicts environmental activist Tim DeChristopher speaking on camera about his sabotage of a 2008 government auction that was to make 150,000 acres of untouched Utah land available for oil and gas drilling. His account of deliberately fraudulent bidding is intercut with panoramic footage of the territory that was up for grabs; in each sequence, a tiny speck in the distance grows until the viewer can see that it is Bowers herself, carrying a slate on which she writes that location's parcel number.

=== Transformer: Display ===
Transformer Display for Community Fundraising (2011) was created in collaboration with artist Olga Koumoundouros. Initially staged in Los Angeles, it consisted of a bricolage-based transient sculpture designed to raise money for and disseminate information about local activist organizations and neighborhood-based charities. A further incarnation at Art Basel Miami Beach (2011), titled Transformer: Display of Community Information And Activation, took the form of a cluster of activist kiosks and a replica of the semi-legendary Miami homeless camp Umoja Village, which burned down mysteriously in 2007 after the city's efforts to remove it via legal means proved ineffective.

=== #sweetjane ===
#sweetjane (2014) explores the Steubenville, Ohio, rape case and the social media-driven activism that brought the young men responsible to trial. At the Pitzer College Art Galleries was installed a 70-foot-long drawing of the text messages sent between the teenagers in the 48 hours after the assault on the young woman, who is known in the media and throughout the trial as Jane Doe.

The Pomona College Museum of Art housed a video installation comprising appropriated media footage and billboard-size photographs of disguised Anonymous protestors at the trial. Taken together, the installations critique the events and the young men, who were depicted sympathetically by the media, and the tolerance in the United States toward sexual assault.

=== No Olvidado (Not Forgotten) ===
No Olvidado (Not Forgotten) is the title of one of Andrea Bowers’ largest and most well-known works. Covering three walls of her 2010 exhibition “The Political Landscape” at Susanne Vielmetter Los Angeles Projects, the piece consisted of a massive 10-foot-tall drawing that stretched for almost 96 feet. Against a smudgy graphite background, it portrayed the white ghost of a chain-link fence topped with coiled barbed wire, through which shone hundreds of names; each represented someone who died while trying to cross the Mexico/U.S. border.

The list of names featured in the work was sourced from Border Angels, an organization that aims to protect those traveling through the Imperial Valley desert region, the mountains around San Diego County, and the border region itself. Although the format echoed that of Maya Lin’s Vietnam Veterans Memorial, the delicate materials and haunting imagery in Bowers’ piece evoked the shadowy lives of undocumented immigrants in the U.S. Like many of her works, No Olvidado served as a deliberately transient monument to the marginalized and forgotten.

=== Letters to an Army of Three ===
Bowers was alerted to a collection of letters from women seeking abortions prior to Roe v. Wade addressed to the Army of Three, a group of three activist women who advocated for the legalization of abortion in the United States in the decade preceding the Supreme Court decision. The Army of Three had assembled a list of doctors who would provide abortions for women in need. Bowers employed what she describes as the “power of storytelling” in the video installation, Letters to an Army of Three, in which actors read the letters aloud. The letters were written by different women along with anyone that would be affected by not having reproductive rights. Writers expressed their thoughts as feelings of alienation, desperation, and in one letter, suicide. The video was installed in her solo show at REDCAT. Bowers work has been credited with influencing political debates regarding reproductive rights. Though her work originated in response to the Bush Administration's position against abortion, it continued to be cited afterward.

=== Open Secret ===
Open Secret (2019) is a large-scale installation of draped printouts documenting the hundreds of men accused of sexual misconduct in the #MeToo era. The work became controversial when it was discovered that Bowers had used graphic photos of the bruised face and body of Helen Donahue, a sexual assault survivor, without Donahue's permission. Donahue was horrified to learn that images she had posted on Twitter in 2017 were being featured in an artwork that would be seen by tens of thousands of people and that reportedly had a price tag of $300,000. The offending images were removed by Art Basel and Bowers issued a formal apology.

=== My Name Means Future ===
My Name Means Future (2020) is a video focusing on the 2014 proposal of the Dakota Access Pipeline which caused protests from both environmental activists and indigenous activists. Indigenous members from the Standing Rock Sioux tribe expressed concerns over the risk of their drinking water becoming polluted in case the pipeline that goes underneath the Missouri River were to break and spill oil. The documentary depicts these exact concerns for both environmental rights and indigenous rights in an interview with Takota Iron Eyes, a young female social activist and member of the Standing Rock Sioux tribe. Bowers met Iron Eyes when she came to South Dakota to take part in the protests opposing the Dakota Access Pipeline. Bowers chose Iron Eyes to be the spokesperson for the documentary because the teenager was a feminist, social and environmental activist, which relates to the video's material.

In the five-part video, Iron Eyes speaks freely of her indigenous heritage, as well as, explaining different sacred areas in her native land that symbolizes importance to the Standing Rock Sioux tribe. Film taken from the drone allows the viewers to see the wide landscapes and environment that surrounds Iron Eyes as she continues to narrate. The grand scenery emphasizes what Iron Eyes is explaining, in her philosophy, that all living things, including humans, are linked to the natural world. She advocates for native rights by noting the land is an important historical and current location where many indigenous peoples engage in keeping their rights over the territory. Iron Eyes uses examples from the historical event of Massacre at Wounded Knee and the current issue of indigenous rights over the water source. Throughout the entire video Iron Eyes seems allowed to be herself as she describes her identity as an indigenous woman which relates back to her feminist position. The teenager even expresses she is a social activist from her spiritual background and teachings of a linkage between all living things and the planet. Think of Our Future (2020) was an extra installation to the video where neon-lit pieces hung on the walls with various short phrases advocating for better environmental and human rights in the future. These pieces were secondary compared to the documentary My Name Means Future (2020).

== Bibliography ==
- Bowers, Andrea (2006). Nothing is Neutral: Andrea Bowers. Los Angeles: California Institute of the Arts: RED.
- Bowers, Andrea (2021). Andrea Bowers. Los Angeles: DelMonico Books.
- Howe, David Everitt (2020). "ANDREA BOWERS: Andrew Kreps [Review of ANDREA BOWERS: Andrew Kreps]". Art in America. 108 (3): 81.
- Myers, Holly (2006). "ART REVIEW; Balancing art, politics; 'Nothing Is Neutral' exhibit toes the fine line between activism and artistic integrity: HOME EDITION". The Los Angeles Times.
- Worland, Justin (2016). "The Fight Over the Dakota Access Pipeline Could Be the Next Keystone". Time.

== Permanent collections ==
Bowers artworks and site specific projects are included in the permanent collections or museum institutions from around the world such as the Museum of Modern Art, New York; Pérez Art Museum Miami; the Whitney Museum of American Art, New York; Hirshhorn Museum and Sculpture Garden, Washington D.C.; the Museum of Contemporary Art, Los Angeles; and Museum Abteiberg, Germany; among others.
