= Henry J. Rosner =

American journalist

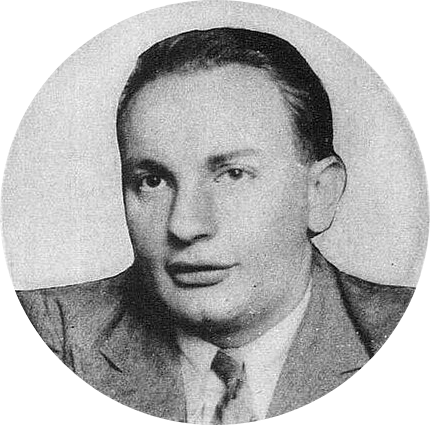
- Rosner c. 1933
- Born: March 9, 1909; New York, NY
- Died: March 16, 1982 (aged 73); New York, NY
- Education: City College of New York, 1929
- Occupations: Welfare Administrator and Journalist
- Years active: 1929–1982
- Spouses: Sophie Kimels (1929–?); Ruth Gruber (1974–1982; his death)
- Children: Barbara Seaman; Jeri Drucker; Elaine Rosner-Jeria

Henry Rosner (March 9, 1909 – March 16, 1982) was an American policy researcher, journalist, and fiscal administrator for public welfare programs in New York City and New York State. He consulted for and helped set up welfare programs and departments in a number of U.S. cities and states, including Vermont, and foreign countries, including Israel.

== Personal life ==
Rosner was the oldest of seven children, along with his twin sister Sally Miller. He married Sophie Kimels in December 1929. The couple, who had met at a Young People's Socialist League picnic, honeymooned in Russia, which they found to be a totalitarian dictatorship rather than the socialist utopia they had hoped to see. They later wrote a report to Norman Thomas about their experience of Russia. (see Barbara Seaman)

Rosner and Kimels and had three children: Barbara Seaman, Jeri Drucker, and Elaine Rosner-Jeria. After Kimels' death, Rosner married journalist Ruth Gruber in 1974.

== Career ==
As Norman Thomas's policy researcher, Rosner helped write the socialist platform for the 1932 presidential race. Rosner contributed "The Myth of a Progressive Governor," a statistic-filled six page tract blasting Franklin D. Roosevelt's failure to honor his promise to "remember the forgotten man at the bottom." On Roosevelt's position (or lack thereof) regarding the seven-day work week, Rosner wrote:

While distinguished economists urge the five-day week as a solution for the unemployment problem, Roosevelt has done nothing to abolish the seven-day work week among New York transit employees, hotel and cafeteria workers, and elevator operators in apartment houses. The records of the N.Y.Ç. Transit Commission reveal that there are 25,000 subway guards, platform men, street car conductors, motormen and bus drivers in New York City alone who work ten hours a day or more seven days a week. There are 25,000 hotel workers in New York City who never get a day off. Thousands of cafeteria works and elevator operators are in the same predicament. The same conditions exist on the state payroll. Guards and attendants in state hospitals and state prisons work ten and twelve hours a day seven days a week. Watchmen, lock tenders, and bridge workers in the state department of public works are also denied one day of rest in seven.

It would be a simple matter to amend that section of the N.Y. labor law so as to give all workers in New York this protection. At the request of the City Affairs Committee such an amendment was introduced at the 1932 session of the Legislature. The bill was never reported out of committee or given a public hearing. Communications were sent to the Governor, acquainting him with the facts and requesting his support, but he did not make any effort to compel action from the legislature. In his gubernatorial messages to the legislature, he never mentioned the abolition of the seven-day week."

The following year, Rosner was co-editor of the 1933 handbook of the New York Socialist Party.

After trouncing the Socialists and the Republicans in the 1932 election, Roosevelt met with Norman Thomas, Henry Rosner, and other members of the Socialist Party. As president, Roosevelt took on many of the social issues Rosner had criticized him for ignoring during his years as governor of New York.

In this respect, Rosner played an important, though low key, role as an early proponent for New Deal programs.

As Fiscal officer for welfare for New York City, Rosner served under all New York City Mayors from Fiorello LaGuardia through Abraham Beame. He retired as Assistant Administrator of the New York City Human Resources Administration in 1975.

Rosner contributed controversial and influential articles to The Nation magazine and other political periodicals.
