= Olga Koumoundouros =

American sculptor based in Los Angeles (born 1965)

Olga Koumoundouros is an American sculptor based in Los Angeles.

Koumoundouros was born in New York, New York in 1965. Her sculptures and installations address issues of real estate, gentrification and social justice. After her neighbors' house was abandoned, she occupied the space and transformed it into a work of art.

She received her MFA from the California Institute of the Arts in Valencia, California in 2001.

== Selected exhibitions ==
=== 2013 ===
- We made life here for a little while, Susanne Vielmetter Los Angeles Projects Off-site, Altadena, CA
- Dream Home Resource Center, Hammer Museum, Los Angeles, CA
- Transformer Display for Community Fundraising: Phase 4, Tang Museum, Skidmore College, Saratoga Springs, NY (two-person show with Andrea Bowers)
- Possessed by Glint and Dreams, Susanne Vielmetter Los Angeles Projects, Culver City, CA

=== 2011 ===
- Wall Works: CART-What Do We Need to Get By and How Do We Get There?, Santa Monica Museum of Art, Santa Monica, CA
- Susanne Vielmetter Los Angeles Projects, Culver City, CA

=== 2009 ===
Demand Management, REDCAT, Los Angeles, CA (June 26 – August 23, 2009)

=== 2008 ===
Great Expectations and The Wreck of the Hope, Susanne Vielmetter Los Angeles Projects (Project Space)

=== 2007 ===
"A Roof Upended,” Open Satellite, Bellevue, WA.

=== 2006 ===
"Thieves Vinegar,” Adamski Gallery, Aachen Germany.

=== 2005 ===
"More Yellow Wallpaper,” Mullin Gallery, Occidental College, Los Angeles.

=== 2004 ===
"Designated Hitters at the Spider Hole,” Adamski Gallery, Aachen, Germany.

=== 2002 ===
"#9", 5301 Sunset Blvd, Los Angeles, CA (two-person show with Rodney McMillian)

=== 1999 ===
"Just in Case,” INMO Gallery, Chung King Road, Chinatown, Los Angeles.
