= Barbara Seaman =

American journalist (1935–2008)

- Seaman in 1980
- Born: September 11, 1935
- Died: February 27, 2008 (aged 72); Manhattan, New York
- Occupations: Activist, author, journalist
- Years active: 1950–2008

Barbara Seaman (September 11, 1935 – February 27, 2008) was an American author, feminist activist, and journalist, and a principal founder of the women's health movement.

== Early years ==
Seaman, whose parents, Henry J. Rosner and Sophie Kimels, met at a Young People's Socialist League (1907) picnic, grew up in a politically progressive milieu. (Pete Seeger sang at her nursery school when she was four years old).

When she was in high school, Seaman won a writing contest. The prize was dinner with Eleanor Roosevelt, according to a 1997 interview of Seaman by author/attorney Karen Winner.

The death of her aunt Sally from endometrial cancer at age 49, in 1959, sensitized Seaman to women's health issues at an early age. Her aunt's oncologist attributed her death to Premarin, which her gynecologist had prescribed for the relief of menopausal symptoms.

== Career ==
Seaman graduated from Oberlin College in 1956 and began her career in writing by editing local women's publications. Seaman began freelance writing in 1960, selling her first magazine article about resisting post-delivery medication while breast-feeding. She wrote health columns for McCall's and authored pieces on the effects of natural childbirth.

In 1968, Seaman received a Sloan-Rockefeller Science Writing Fellowship and a certificate in science writing from the Columbia University Graduate School of Journalism. She conducted extensive research on birth control pill risks, including blood clots and depression. Seaman served as Vice President of the Women's Medical Center in New York from 1971 to 1973 and was a board member of the National Organization for Women. She was an influential public speaker and lecturer and advocated for women's health rights, mostly on the issue of diethylstilbestrol (DES). She co-authored The Menopause Industry: How the Medical Establishment Exploits Women in 1994 and edited The Practice and Politics of Women's Health in 1999. From 1997 until her death in 2008, she served as a judge for the Project Censored Awards and served on the educational board of Women Promoting non-profit and the Feminist Press, while mentoring young feminists and offering her contacts, ideas, and even her apartment as a resource.

Seaman received several awards for her work, including the Pioneer Woman Award from the American Association of Retired Persons, the Athena Award from the National Council for Women's Health, and the Health Advocacy Award from the American Public Health Association.

== Writings and activism ==
When the birth control pill came on the market in 1960, Barbara was writing columns for women's magazines such as Brides and the Ladies' Home Journal. She launched her career as a women's health journalist and brought a new kind of health reporting to the field, writing articles that centered more on the patient and less on the medical fads of the day. Seaman was first to reveal that women lacked the information they needed to make informed decisions on child-bearing, breast-feeding, and oral contraceptives. She even went so far as to alert women to the dangers of the Pill, whose primary ingredient was estrogen (also the active ingredient in Premarin, which had contributed to the death of her aunt). Prolific output and the popularity of her published articles won Seaman membership in the prestigious Society of Magazine Writers. Through this organization she met Betty Friedan, who asked her to cover events such as the founding of NOW (1966), the founding of NARAL (1969), and other milestones in the development of second-wave feminism. Befriended by Gloria Steinem, Seaman also became a contributing editor at Ms. magazine.

In 1969, she completed her first book, The Doctors' Case Against the Pill, which became the basis for the Nelson Pill Hearings on the safety of the combined oral contraceptive pill. As a result of the hearings, the FDA required the pill to come with a printed health warning. This was the first informational insert for any prescription drug. Robert Finch, Secretary of HEW, praised Seaman saying, "The Doctors' Case Against the Pill... was a major factor in our strengthening the language in the final warning published in the Federal Register to be included in each package of the Pill." The dramatic events surrounding the hearings brought together many soon-to-be prominent health feminists for the first time, and encouraged them to pursue further action.

In 1975 Seaman co-founded the National Women's Health Network with Alice Wolfson, Belita Cowan, Mary Howell (M.D.) and Phyllis Chesler (PhD).

Also in 1975, Seaman made "Four Demands"—a speech at Harvard Medical School in which she called for more women be admitted to training in obstetrics and gynecology. At the time, the number was barely 3%. Another demand was that women have a say in how research money concerning female reproduction be spent.

In tandem with her work as a writer, Seaman was a political organizer. She was a founding member of the New York Women's Forum (1973), vice president of the New York City Women's Medical Center (1971), and sat on the advisory board of the New York chapter of the National Organization for Women (1973).

== Health Feminist Hub ==
Seaman was an enthusiastic promoter of other writers on women's health and body issues. In a piece published in The New York Times on December 2, 1972, she wrote "Some women want to let their doctors do the worrying for them. But for those of us who don't, it has been extremely difficult to get honest health information." Seaman praised women's self-help books, including Our Bodies, Ourselves; Women and Madness; Why Natural Childbirth; and Vaginal Politics, that brought feminist perspectives to women's health. She later helped to write major obituaries for her fellow activists in the women's health movement, including Dr. Mary Howell and Lorraine Rothman.

== Commercial censorship ==
Due to her criticism of the birth control pill and other commercially important pharmaceutical products, Seaman was fired, blacklisted, and censored on numerous occasions. She was dismissed from Ladies Home Journal, Family Circle, Omni and Hadassah magazines.

In 2005, U.S. Representative Carolyn Maloney stated in the Congressional Record that, "In the 1980s Barbara was essentially blacklisted from magazines by pharmaceutical companies who would not advertise in publications that carried her stories. Her relentless insistence on questioning the safety and effectiveness of their products earned her their condemnation and our praise. Barbara took advantage of this forced lull by turning to biography."

During the 1980s, Seaman published Lovely Me, a biography of Jacqueline Susann, which was made into a television movie, Scandalous Me, starring Michele Lee.

== Final years ==
Seaman lived in New York City, close to her three children, four grandchildren, two sisters, and two nephews.

Until the end of her life, she was writing articles and advocating for women's safety and participation in their own medical treatment. Seaman continued to write about hormonal contraceptives, childbirth, and the unwillingness of some doctors and pharmaceutical companies to disclose risks to patients and consumers. On February 27, 2008, Seaman died of lung cancer.

In June 2000, The New York Times published a piece by Seaman, "The Pill and I: 40 Years On, the Relationship Remains Wary".

She collaborated with Laura Eldridge on two books, The No Nonsense Guide to Menopause released in 2008 (Simon & Schuster) and Voices of the Women's Health Movement (Seven Stories Press) to be published in January 2012.

In 2009 the 40th anniversary edition of the Doctors' Case Against the Pill was published.

== Education ==
- BA (Ford Foundation scholar), Oberlin College, 1956
- Honorary LHD, Oberlin College, 1978
- Certificate in advanced science writing (Sloan-Rockefeller Science Writing Fellowship), Columbia University School of Journalism, 1968

== Writings ==
=== Magazines ===
- Frequent contributor to The New York Times and The Washington Post
- Either a columnist or contributing editor at Ms. magazine, Omni, Ladies' Home Journal, Hadassah
- Bride's and Family Circle

=== Books ===
- The Doctor's Case Against the Pill (1969)
- Free and Female (1972)
- Women and the Crisis in Sex Hormones (1977) (with Gideon Seaman, M.D.)
- Lovely Me: The Life of Jacqueline Susann (1987)
- The Greatest Experiment ever Performed on Women: Exploding the Estrogen Myth (2003)
- For Women Only: Your Guide to Health Empowerment with Gary Null (2000)

Contributor to many books, including:

- Career and Motherhood (1979)
- Rooms with No View (1974)
- Women and Men (1975)
- Seizing our Bodies (1978)
- Voices of the Women's Health Movement, Volumes 1 & 2 (Seven Stories Press, 2012)

Contributor to several plays and documentaries, including:

- I am a Woman (1972)
- Taking Our Bodies Back (1974)
- The American Experience Presents the Pill (2003)

== Honors ==
In 2000, Seaman was named by the US Postal Service as an honoree of the 1970s Women's Rights Movement stamp. Winner of Matrix Award in Books, 1978.

== Sources ==
- Baker, Christina Looper & and Kline, Christina Baker. The Conversation Begins: Mothers and Daughters Talk About Living Feminism, Bantam Books, 1996. ISBN 0-553-09639-7.
- Seaman, Barbara. "The Greatest Experiment Ever Performed on Women", Hyperion, 2003. ISBN 0-7868-6853-8.
- Science Magazine, article by Charles Mann entitled "Women¹s Health Research Blossoms" (August 11, 1995)
- Barbara Seaman, Jewish Women's Archive series on Jewish Women and the Feminist Revolution (JWA)
- Boxer, Sarah. "The Contraception Conundum: It's Not Just Birth Control Anymore", The New York Times, June 22, 1997
- "A Dozen Who Have Risen to Prominence", The New York Times, 1997
- Levine, Suzanne Braun Inventing the Rest of Our Lives: Women in Second Adulthood (New York: Viking, 2005)
- Seaman, Barbara, "Dear Injurious Physician", The New York Times, December 2, 1972, p. 32 https://www.nytimes.com/1972/12/02/archives/dear-injurious-physician.html
- Nathan, Linda K., "The First Lady Of Women’s Health", Jewish Week, October 6, 2004
- Science Magazine, "Women's Health Research Blossoms", August 11, 1995
- Love, Barbara J. & Kott, Nancy F., "Feminists who Changed America, 1963–1975", University of Illinois Press, 2006.
