= Native American Women's Health Education Resource Center =

Native American women's health nonprofit

The Native American Women's Health Education Resource Center (NAWHERC) is a nonprofit organization that provides health resources to Native American women and also advocates for women's health, reproductive choices, economic issues and land and water rights. NAWHERC is first organization dedicated to women's health to open up on an Indian Reservation in the United States. Its agenda is "consistently broad" because NAWHERC does not separate women's issues from community issues.

The organization was founded by Native Americans who lived on the Yankton Sioux reservation. Charon Asetoyer is the executive director and one of the original founders of NAWHERC. The organization is located in Lake Andes. NAWHERC has been a Ms. Foundation for Women grantee. NAWHERC also collaborates with the Indigenous Women's Network, and is part of the SisterSong Women of Color Reproductive Justice Collective.

== History ==
Charon Asetoyer and her husband, Clarence Rockboy, set up the Native American Community Board (NACB) in 1985 on the Yankton Sioux reservation. Others involved with the initial founding were Everdale Jackie Rouse and Lorenzo Dion. The NACB was first located in the basement of Asetoyer's house. Asetoyer attended a conference in Washington, D.C., sponsored by the National Women's Health Network, where Luz Alvarez urged her to seek donations to help create a larger center. In 1988 NACB created NAWHERC. A building was purchased on the reservation to house the center. The center for NAWHERC opened in February 1988. The NACB acts as the governing board of NAWHERC.

The NAWHERC first tackled the issue of fetal alcohol syndrome (FAS) because of the high rate of FAS in the community. In 1990, NAWHERC organized "Empowerment Through Dialogue", a gathering of 30 Native women representing 10 Nations in Pierre, South Dakota. From the three day gathering, an "Agenda for Native Women's Reproductive Rights" was created. This part of NAWHERC became known as the Reproductive Rights Coalition and by 1994 included 150 women from 26 different tribes.

In 1991, NAWHERC opened a women's domestic violence shelter.

The "Agenda for Native Women's Reproductive Rights", which includes calls for culturally and age-appropriate sex education, affordable health care, reproductive rights and other issues for Native women, is still used in discussions today.

== Activities ==
NAWHERC runs a domestic violence shelter and has programs for AIDS prevention. They also provide programs about domestic violence, Dakota language and culture, and health and environmental awareness. NAWHERC also runs a hotline. NAWHERC collects information about Native women's health, often using a traditional Native American approach, the roundtable process. The roundtable becomes a safe-space where women are able to discuss issues they face. NAWHERC "has been prolific in producing research".

NAWHERC has been active in reporting abuses in reproductive care and medication in the Native American community. In 2015, they reported that Indian Health Services (IHS) were not providing the emergency contraceptive, Plan B One-Step, which is non-compliant with the FDA guidelines of 2013. A year later, NAWHERC continued to advocate for to access Plan B One-Step at IHS facilities. Finally in 2015, the IHS created an updated policy for providing emergency contraceptive which the ACLU called a "long overdue and important step toward ensuring that Native American women have equal access to emergency contraceptive care."

NAWHERC advocates for Native women's rights across the country, however, its main focus is on the health of Native women living in the Aberdeen area which includes women living in North Dakota, South Dakota, Iowa and Nebraska.

== Publications ==
The group published the Indigenous Women's Health Book, Within the Sacred Circle: Reproductive Rights, Environmental Health, Traditional Herbs and Remedies in 2004. Windspeaker called the book "well-organized and comprehensive", with issues about women's health written by Native women and including chapters about women who are two-spirited. In 2016, they released a guide called What To Do When You're Raped, a guide for Native girls which is free and provides advice and access to resources. The title of the book was specifically chosen by Asetoyer to read as "When You're Raped", rather than "If You're Raped" because of the epidemic of sexual assaults on reservations today.

Other educational materials, such as pamphlets, created by NAWHERC have relevant, up-to-date information and practical advice for women's health.
