= Charon Asetoyer =

Native American activist

Charon Virginia Asetoyer (née Huber, born March 24, 1951) is a Comanche activist and women's health advocate. Asetoyer is one of the founders of the Native American Community Board (NACB) and the Native American Women's Health Education Resource Center (NAWHERC). She has been awarded the Woman of Vision award by the Ms. Foundation and the United Nations Distinguished Services Award.

== Biography ==
Charon Asetoyer was born on March 24, 1951, in San Jose, California to a Comanche mother and father of European descent. She moved to San Francisco where she married Dennis Duncan in 1972, and got a job as a WIC program leader and counselor at the Urban Indian Health Clinic in SF's financial district. The abusive marriage ended in 1977 and she left California.

Asetoyer moved to Sioux Falls, South Dakota in 1977 and enrolled in the University of South Dakota, where she matriculated from in 1981 with a bachelor's degree in criminal justice. That same year she married Yankton Sioux tribe member Clarence Rockboy and moved to Brattleboro, Vermont. They have two children. Asetoyer obtained a dual master's degree in 1983 for Management and Intercultural Administration from Vermont's School for International Training. Abiding by Yankton Sioux tradition, the family returned to Sioux Falls, South Dakota in 1983 following the death of Clarence's father. Clarence was to serve a four-year sentence at the reservation in order to fulfill a cultural and religious memorial commitment after his father's death.

== Activist work ==
Her work in California and her own abusive first marriage pushed Charon Asetoyer to help more dislocated women, specifically Natives. In 1978, Asetoyer and others involved with the American Indian Movement (AIM) sought to reconstruct and modernize women's role in the Native community, giving them back some independence within the family unit and in regard to their own healthcare; over 300 women separated themselves from the AIM and formed the group known as Women of All Red Nations.

== Recent work ==
Asetoyer ran for Mayor of Lake Andes and state senate in two separate elections, but all attempts were unsuccessful. In the mid 2000s, she campaigned against gerrymandering in South Dakota and how polling centers actively prevented Natives from voting. In 2004, a polling place in Lake Andes, SD on the Yankton Sioux Tribe had an illegitimate sign that said in order to vote, a valid photo ID was required. Charon Asetoyer stood up against this injustice with the proof that it was not legal to require an ID and that there were government-accepted alternate documents, especially because Natives living in Yankton Sioux did not have IDs. Asetoyer claimed that poll workers were being force-fed incorrect information in order to cancel the Native vote, and at least twenty one Native Americans were turned away from the polls in just that location. Asetoyer and the community outcry gained the attention of South Dakota's Secretary of State, Chris Nelson. Nelson adamantly agreed with Asetoyer and set out on an initiative to educate poll workers and higher-ups authorities at the polls.

== Writings ==
=== NAWHERC ===
- Jennings, Jennifer; Asetoyer, Charon (1996). The impact of AIDS in the Native American community. Native Women's Health Education Resource Center.
- Asetoyer, Charon; Cronk, Katharine; Hewakapuge, Samanthi (2003). Indigenous Women's Health Book, Within the Sacred Circle: Reproductive Rights, Environmental Health, Traditional Herbs and Remedies... Native American Womens Health Education Resource Center.
- Schindler, Kati; Jackson, Anna E.; Asetoyer, Charon (2002). Indigenous Women's Reproductive Rights: The Indian Health Service and Its Inconsistent Application of the Hyde Amendment. Native American Women's Health Education Resource Center.
- Krust, Lin; Asetoyer, Charon (1993). A Study of the Use of Depo-Provera and Norplant by the Indian Health Services. Native American Women's Health Education Resource Center.
- Chen, Ellen H.; Asetoyer, Charon (1995). A Review of the Use and Effects of Depo-Provera on Native American Women Within Indian Health Services and Other Federal Agencies. Native American Women's Health Education Resource Center.
- Lewry, Natasha; Asetoyer, Charon (1992). The Impact of Norplant in the Native American Community. Native American Women's Health Education Resource Center.

=== Journal articles and book chapters ===
- Giroux, Jennifer; Takehara, Joan; Asetoyer, Charon; Welty, Thomas (1997). "HIV/AIDS universal precaution practices in sun dance ceremonies". Journal of Health Education. 28 (sup1): –72. doi:10.1080/10556699.1997.10608636.
- Easthope, Tracey; Asetoyer, Charon (1998). "The Impact of AIDS in the Native American Community". Native American Women's Health Education Resource Center, A Project of the Native American Community Board, PO Box. 572: 57356–0572.
- Asetoyer, Charon (1987). "Fetal Alcohol Syndrome: An International Concern". Winds of Change. 2 (4): 29–30.
- Asetoyer, Charon (2007). "From the ground up". Race, Ethnicity, and Gender: Selected Readings: 256.
- Asetoyer, Charon (1990). Fetal Alcohol Syndrome "Chemical Genocide.". International Secretariat of IWGIA, Fiolstraede 10 DK-1171, Copenhagenk, Denmark.
