= Laura Eldridge =

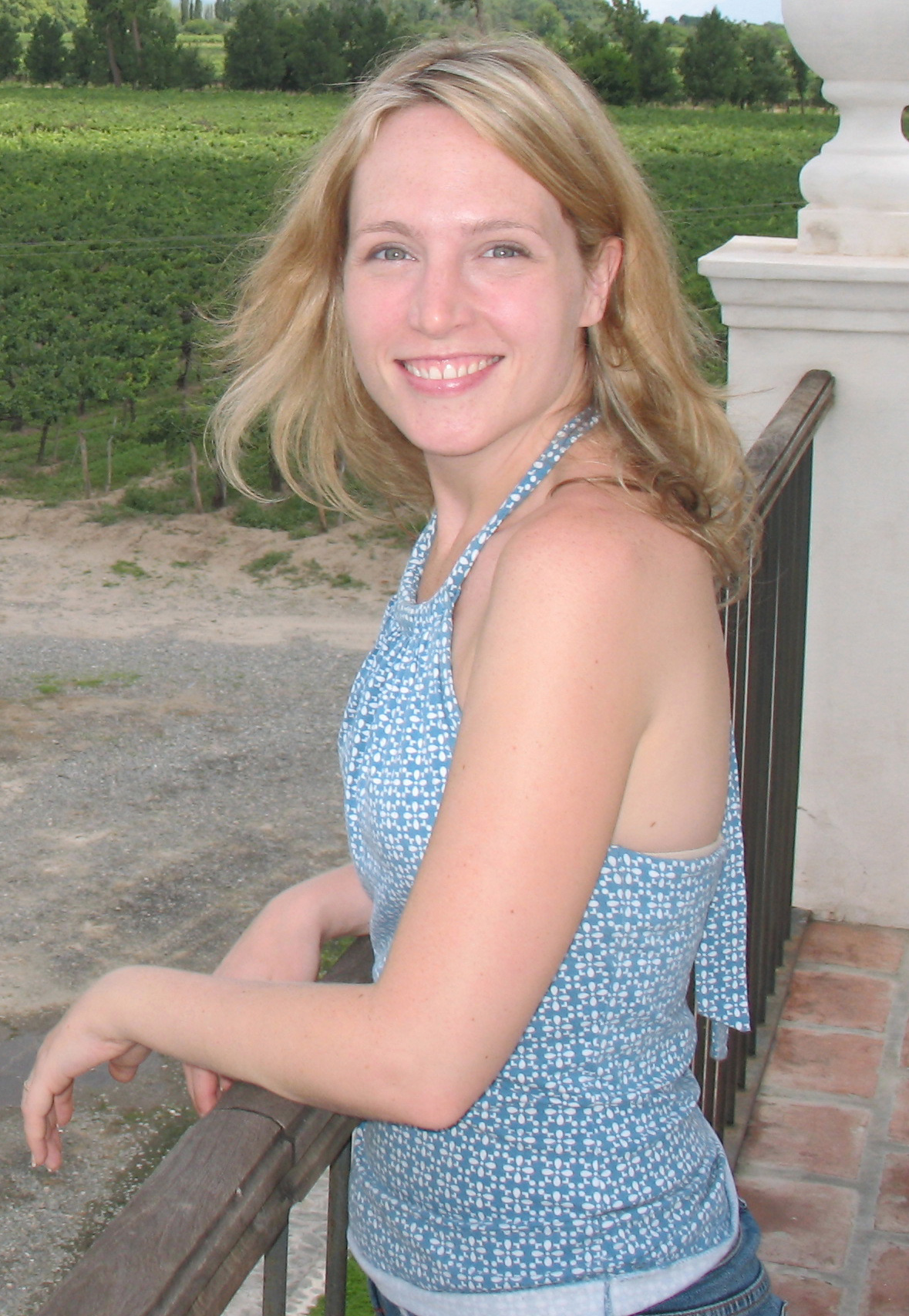
- Laura Eldridge, by Jeremy Weinberg
- Education: Barnard College
- Occupations: Writer, activist
- Years active: 2007–current

Laura Eldridge is an American women's health writer and activist. She began working with the women's health activist and author of The Doctor's Case Against The Pill, Barbara Seaman, when studying at Barnard College. She is co-author of The No-Nonsense Guide To Menopause as well as the co-editor, also with Barbara Seaman, of Voices of the Women's Health Movement (Seven Stories Press, 2012) a collection of essays, interviews, and commentary by leading activists, writers, doctors, and sociologists on topics ranging across reproductive rights, sex and orgasm, activism, motherhood and birth control. She is also the author of In Our Control: The Complete Guide to Contraceptive Choices for Women.

== Books ==
- The No-Nonsense Guide To Menopause (Simon & Schuster, 2008)
- In Our Control: The Complete Guide to Contraceptive Choices for Women (Seven Stories Press, 2010)
- Voices of the Women's Health Movement, Volumes 1&2 (Seven Stories Press, 2012)
