= Pat Maginnis =

American activist (1928–2021)

Patricia Theresa Maginnis
- Born: June 9, 1928; Ithaca, New York
- Died: August 30, 2021 (aged 93); Oakland, California
- Known for: first abortion rights activist

Patricia Theresa "Pat" Maginnis (June 9, 1928 – August 30, 2021) was considered the first abortion rights activist in American history. She was one part of the "Army of Three", the grass-roots collective that would eventually become NARAL Pro-Choice America and that founded the Society for Humane Abortion. She was also a political cartoonist, painter, and peace activist. In 2018, she was chosen by the National Women's History Alliance as one of its honorees for Women's History Month in the United States.

== Life ==
Maginnis was born on June 9, 1928, in Ithaca, New York, to a staunchly Catholic family. She grew up in Oklahoma, where her father was a veterinarian. Her mother suffered from chronic pain from numerous pregnancies.

She joined the Women's Army Corps and was trained as a surgical technologist. During her brief service in the United States Army, Maginnis was deployed to Panama, as punishment for fraternizing with a Black soldier. She described her time in Panama and the horrible treatment of pregnant women in the army hospital as her inspiration to advocate for women's reproductive freedoms during her life. She began her activism when she returned to the United States, settling in the San Francisco Bay Area in 1959. She attended San Jose State University.

Maginnis died on August 30, 2021, in Oakland, California.

== Abortion rights activism ==
Maginnis began her activism immediately upon her return to the United States. She canvassed in support of abortion reform bills, before becoming dissatisfied with what she felt was the prioritization of medical professionals over women. By 1963, Maginnis had adopted a radical ideology that supported the repeal of all abortion laws, which she felt diminished the rights of women and would hinder access to abortion for all women.

=== Society for Humane Abortion (SHA) ===
In 1962, Maginnis founded the Citizens Committee for Humane Abortion Laws (CCHAL), while she attended San Jose State University. She moved the organization to San Francisco in 1963, where she met Rowena Gurner, who was to become a pivotal figure in the organization. In 1964, Gurner and Maginnis changed the organization's name to The Society for Humane Abortion (SHA), and in 1965, it was incorporated as a non-profit organization in California. SHA advocated for "elective abortion", insisting that all women had the right to safe and legal abortion, free of harassment, and that "[the] termination of pregnancy is a decision which the person or family involved should be free to make, as their own religious beliefs, values, emotions, and circumstances may dictate". The organization's radical nature meant that it believed in the repeal of all abortion laws, including the 1963 Humane Abortion Act, aka the "Bielenson Bill", which made abortion legal in cases of rape or incest.

SHA provided public education on abortion "by sponsoring symposia on abortion procedures for physicians; providing speakers and literature to libraries, medical schools, physicians, family planning agencies, and individuals; and publishing a quarterly newsletter". Sponsored by the American Humanist Association, in 1968. SHA operated a free Post-Abortion Care Center (PACC). The organization was disbanded in 1975, two years after the decision in Roe v. Wade legalized abortion nationwide and voided the Humane Abortion Act.

=== Association to Repeal Abortion Laws (ARAL) ===
While still heading the Society for Humane Abortion, Maginnis set up another organization in 1966, to carry on underground activities. The main mission of ARAL was to connect pregnant women with abortion providers in neighboring countries. Their list of abortion specialists was well-researched, and depended on members' information and the feedback of the women they referred.

=== "Army of Three" ===
Rowena Gurner, Patricia Maginnis, and Lana Phelan formed the "Army of Three", which worked on behalf of ARAL to connect women to abortion providers. Women wrote letters from across the country soliciting guidance and information. The three women provided kits to women in need that went beyond a list of doctors: They provided these desperate women with "instructions for going through customs, an evaluation form to be returned to Association to Repeal Abortion Laws after completion of the abortion, summaries of laws, and directions for self-induced abortion".

In 2006, artist Andrea Bowers exhibited her video, Letters to an Army of Three, as part of her solo exhibition Nothing Is Neutral at REfDCAT. The hour-long video features actors reading the original letters sent to the Army of Three in the years before abortion was legal. The walls of the gallery space were covered in Bowers' drawings of some of the letters. Bowers collected the letters after visiting Maginnis in her Oakland home and discovering the activist's personal archive. In 2012, Bowers' work associated with the "Army of Three" letters was revisited in Wall of Letters: Necessary Reminders from the Past for a Future of Choice at the Walker Art Center.

== Political cartoons ==
Maginnis drew cartoons beginning in the mid-1960s. Her subjects were informed by her political activism, and often antagonized capitalist interests and conservative policymakers. The subject of her early work was mostly limited to issues related to reproductive rights and abortion, but her oeuvre was as diverse as her activism. More recent cartoons demonstrated Maginnis' support for the Occupy Movement, and others took aim at the 2012 Republican Presidential Candidates.
