= Mary Howell =

American lawyer and doctor (1932–1998)

Mary Catherine Raugust Howell (September 2, 1932 – February 5, 1998) was a physician, psychologist, lawyer, mentor, musician and mother. She was the first woman dean at Harvard Medical School (1972–1975) and led the fight to end quotas and open medical schools to women.

== Biography ==
Dr. Howell was born in Grand Forks, North Dakota. She attended Radcliffe College, and received an M.D. and PhD. in psychology in 1962 from the University of Minnesota, then received a J.D. from Harvard Law School in 1991.

=== Career and advocacy ===
She was one of five co-founders in 1975 of the National Women's Health Network, along with Barbara Seaman, Alice Wolfson, Belita Cowan, and Phyllis Chesler, Ph.D., and a contributor to Our Bodies, Ourselves. Her book, Why Would a Girl Go Into Medicine?, started as a collection of the experiences of women medical students – documenting the flagrant discrimination against women – and became instrumental (in synch with the feminist movement) in helping to fuel Title IX legislation and increasing the percentage of women medical students from 9% in 1969 to 25% in 1979, to almost 50% in 2007.

Aside from raising seven children, she opened her home to many students, and to women during transitions in life, sharing her untiring search for knowledge, her humor, her music and her bread-baking. She encouraged students to examine the political aspects of health care, ranging from nutrition in schoolchildren to the power of special interest groups through legislation affecting health care. She encouraged parents to take charge of their children's health and practiced pediatric medicine in Boston and in Maine. She worked with people with disabilities and mental illness through the Shriver Center and the Walter E. Fernald State School in Waltham, Massachusetts; children with drug addiction, homelessness, or HIV through the Medical Van, a program at the Massachusetts General Hospital for street youth; and most recently as the Director of Adoption Resources. She was a member of the Division of Medical Ethics at Harvard Medical School from 1992 to 1994. She strongly encouraged mothers to nurture their children's health, and through her understanding of medicine in political terms, offered people strategies to understand the medical care they received, and to communicate effectively to caretakers about their needs. She was the author of numerous articles and seven books, including Helping Ourselves, Healing at Home, Death and Dying and Ethical dilemmas: A guide for staff serving developmentally disabled adults and Serving the Underserved: Caring for people who are both old and mentally retarded. She also wrote a monthly column called "Working Mother" in McCall's magazine from 1977 to 1987.

=== Other pursuits ===
Aside from being a physician and a lawyer, Howell loved to play violin and viola as a chamber musician. She participated in the Apgar Quartet (instruments made by Virginia Apgar (under the guidance of Carleen Hutchins), the anesthesiologist who developed the Apgar Score) performance in Dallas, at the American Academy of Pediatrics Convention, in honor of the commemorative stamp of Virginia Apgar.

== Legacy ==
She died in Watertown, Massachusetts. To honor her love of music and children, the Mary Howell memorial scholarship was established at the Children's Orchestra Society.
