= Feminist health center =

A feminist health center is an independent, not-for-profit, alternative medical facility that primarily provides gynecological health care. Many feminist health centers were founded in the 1970s as part of the women's health movement in the United States. These centers were founded with the purposes of challenging the medicalization of health care, providing an alternative to mainstream health facilities, and increasing access to gynecological information and services for all women, regardless of race, class, sexual orientation, or insurance coverage.

== History ==
Feminist health centers emerged as a part of the women's health movement in the 1970s. The women's health movement grew out of social movements of the 1960s, including the New Left, the Civil Rights Movement, and dissatisfaction with the delivery of women's health care. Members of the women's health movement saw health care as a highly politicized issue and wanted to challenge the racism, classism, and sexism they saw in professionalized medicine.

In her history of the women's health movement, feminist anthropologist Sandra Morgen notes, “Feminist clinics never accounted for the majority of women’s health movement groups. But […] they were vanguard organizations that were fertile soils for many of the movement’s innovations.” Feminist health centers were intended as a challenge to the way mainstream health care was delivered. Many in the women's health movement embraced self-help, from reading the seminal text Our Bodies, Ourselves to performing illegal abortions as part of the infamous Jane Collective in Chicago. The philosophy of self-help was practiced in feminist health centers by the teaching of cervical self-exam, and also by creating a more collaborative relationship between the health care provider (who was not necessarily a physician) and patient. The Federation of Feminist Women's Health Centers, an organized, nationwide group of feminist health centers, published self-help books such as "How To Stay Out of the Gynecologist's Office." These books went further than expanding women's knowledge about their own bodies by additionally enabling women to treat some common infections, such as UTIs and yeast infections, with home remedies. Health activists decried the “doctor knows best” model of care, noting that the professionalization of medical care had excluded women as both providers and consumers of medical care.

The body of scholarship that emerged from the women's health movement underscores the fact that, historically, women had been health care providers for millennia. It was not until the mid-nineteenth century that women were pushed out of medicine by increasingly professionalized health care delivery in the United States. Women were further excluded from medicine through the doctor-patient relationship, by which women were presented with minimal information or choices about the health care they received, and even their own bodies. Feminist health activists argued that the drape used by gynecologists during pelvic exams symbolized a veil of secrecy.

Throughout their early years, feminist health centers struggled to uphold their ideals while simultaneously meeting the needs of their clients and their employees. Feminist scholars Myra Marx Ferree and Patricia Yancey Martin argue, “Feminist organizations are an amalgam, a blend of institutionalized and social movement practices. […] A movement organization is not a contradiction in terms, but it is, by definition, in tension. It is always a compromise between the ideals by which it judges itself and the realities of its daily practices.” Many clinics realized that change was necessary for their continued operations – for example, many feminist health centers began as collectives. While many activists believed that collective decision-making promoted egalitarianism, most clinics found that reaching a consensus took too much time, especially as organizations grew to include more personnel and began to serve more clients.

While most clinics found ways to resolve, or at least maintain, the tension between ideals and practice, some refused to compromise. The Women's Community Health Center in Cambridge, Massachusetts is an example of a clinic that maintained an unyielding commitment to its political values. The women who ran the center were unwilling to rely on outside funding, feeling that outside support could coopt their mission. Unfortunately, their refusal to seek external financial support led to a short shelf life for the clinic – the Women's Community Health Center was only open from 1974 until 1981, and was plagued by financial troubles and internal disputes throughout its existence.

In addition to facing internal conflicts, many feminist health centers faced external opposition to their existence. The desire of feminist health activists to alter the delivery of health services alienated many physicians, who saw feminist health centers as offering both criticism and competition to their mainstream practices. Most feminist health centers did cooperate with the medical establishment somewhat, due in large part to state laws requiring physicians to be a part of clinic staff or to perform abortions. Although many feminist health centers initially sought female doctors to join their ranks, the exclusion of women from medical schools meant that most feminist health centers had male physicians on staff. However, not all clinics had a cooperative relationship with medical professionals. The Tallahassee Feminist Women's Health Center had to recruit out-of-town doctors to perform abortions at their clinic because the center's founder had given a newspaper interview criticizing the local medical community, thereby causing their staff physicians to quit and antagonizing other area doctors.

Feminist health centers also faced (and continue to face) frequent attacks, criticism, and protests, primarily relating to their role as abortion providers. Many clinics have been attacked by arsonists and subject to bombings, with some clinics undergoing multiple attacks. Clinic workers and patients also faced harassment from anti-abortion protestors. During the 1980s, the anti-abortion group Operation Rescue was often a fixation outside of many clinics. In 1988, during the Democratic National Convention held in Atlanta, the Feminist Women's Health Center was bombarded with hundreds of protestors outside its doors, making it difficult to continue clinic operations. The Operation Rescue protests in Atlanta resulted in hundreds of arrests.

== Differences from mainstream health clinics ==
Although most feminist health centers are abortion providers, not all of them are. Conversely, not all abortion providers are feminist health centers – in fact, most are not, just as most providers of women's health care are not feminist.

The women's health movement has succeeded in changing mainstream health care in several ways, including mandating the practice of informed consent and implementing the discussion of multiple treatment options. Thus, some practices that were once deemed radical and found primarily in feminist health centers have become routine in medical facilities throughout the country. However, feminist health centers remain distinct from their mainstream counterparts in important ways.

Feminist health centers continue to see health care as a political issue – they believe that improvements in women's health come not only from advances in medicine, but also from society making inroads against injustice and inequality. Feminist health centers will not shy away from controversial topics, including abortion, which most centers are committed to providing as a critical component of comprehensive women's health care.

Furthermore, feminist health centers maintain a commitment to reaching underserved populations that is largely unseen in other medical providers. Feminist health centers provide services to minorities, immigrants, refugees, the LGBTQI community, and the uninsured. To meet these needs, clinics usually offer sliding scale or reduced fees for services, and offer free health care to those who cannot afford to pay. In addition to reaching these oft-neglected populations, feminist health centers try to provide sensitive and respectful health care, recognizing health disparities in underserved groups and tailoring their services to the needs of the communities in which they operate.

== Bibliography ==
- Ferree, Myra Marx; Patricia Yancey Martin (1995). Feminist Organizations: Harvest of the New Women's Movement. Philadelphia: Temple University Press. ISBN 978-1566392297.
- Kline, Wendy (2010). Bodies of Knowledge: Sexuality, Reproduction, and Women's Health in the Second Wave. Chicago: University of Chicago. ISBN 978-0226443089.
- Morgen, Sandra (2002). Into Our Own Hands: The Women's Health Movement in the United States, 1969-1990. New Brunswick, NJ: Rutgers University Press. ISBN 978-0813530710.
