= Thomas Dao =

- Born: Ling Yuan Dao; April 27, 1921; Suzhou, Jiangsu, China
- Died: July 16, 2009 (aged 88); Cheektowaga, New York, US
- Education: Soochow University; Saint John's University
- Medical career
- Profession: Physician
- Field: Breast cancer
- Institutions: University of Chicago Medical School; Roswell Park Comprehensive Cancer Center

Ling Yuan "Thomas" Dao (April 27, 1921 – July 16, 2009) was a Chinese American physician and specialist in breast cancer, its causes and treatment, who was one of the earliest proponents of minimalist alternatives to radical mastectomy as a treatment option for breast cancer, in addition to advocacy of breast self-examination and mammography as means to detect breast cancer as early as possible.

== Early life and education ==
Dao was born on April 27, 1921, in Suzhou, China, where his father was a lawyer. There he went to Soochow University, where he received his undergraduate degree. He attended Saint John's University in Shanghai, where he earned his master's degree and received his medical training, and went to the United States in 1949 for a residency in surgery. He had planned to return to China, but chose to reside in the U.S. after Mao Zedong rose to power. Once he settled in the United States, he adopted the name "Thomas".

== Medical career ==
He worked for future Nobel Prize winner Dr. Charles Brenton Huggins at the University of Chicago Medical School as a researcher assisting in Huggins' studies of how hormones relate to cancer in humans. There, Dao participated in research studies of treating advanced cases of breast cancer by surgical removal of the adrenal gland and ovaries. In 1951, he became an instructor in surgery at the medical school, and was named assistant professor of surgery in 1954.

Starting in 1957, he served at Roswell Park Comprehensive Cancer Center in Buffalo, New York as director of its breast surgery department, focusing on treatment of breast cancer and research into how it is caused and stimulated by hormones. At the time, radical mastectomy was the standard method of treatment used for 90% of cases until the 1970s, involving a surgical procedure where the entire affected breast, axillary lymph nodes and underlying chest muscle (including the pectoral muscles) were removed as soon as a malignant tumor was found through a biopsy. Dao's research showed that more conservative approaches in which the mastectomy was not performed immediately and in which much smaller portions of tissue were removed were just as effective as the radical approach. In 1974, Dao was the physician who performed a modified radical mastectomy for Rose Kushner, who was to become an effective patient activist in opposition to the more radical standard treatments for breast cancer. He endorsed her controversial 1975 book on the subject of breast cancer and its treatment, saying "Every woman in the United States should read this book." By the time of his death, the prevailing standard was a two-step approach in which a patient takes time to consider treatment options with their physician after malignant tumors have been identified. He served at Roswell Park Comprehensive Cancer Center until 1988.

== Personal ==
Dao was a resident of Williamsville, New York. He and his second wife, whom he married in 1954, had two daughters and two sons; he also had four children from a first marriage that ended in divorce.

He died at age 88 on July 16, 2009, at Hospice Buffalo in Cheektowaga, New York due to Pick's disease.
