= Rose Kushner =

American journalist (1929 - 1990)

Rose Rehert Kushner (June 22, 1929 – January 7, 1990) was an American journalist and pioneering advocate for breast cancer patients. She wrote the 1975 book Why Me? What Every Woman Should Know About Breast Cancer to Save Her Life.

== Early life and career ==
Rose Rehert was born on June 22, 1929, in Baltimore, Maryland. Her parents were Eastern European immigrants Israel and Fannie Gravitz Rehert, both of whom died by the time she was 10 years old. As a child, she aspired to a career as a physician, but her family was unable or unwilling to send her to college. After high school she worked at the Johns Hopkins School of Medicine from 1947 to 1951 and took pre-med courses at Baltimore Junior College in 1949.

In 1951 she married Harvey Kushner and had three children, born between 1952 and 1958. She returned to college in the 1960s, changing her concentration to journalism, and in 1972 receiving an A.B. degree summa cum laude from the University of Maryland. In the late 1960s and early 1970s she did medical writing and freelance journalism work, including work in Bolivia and Vietnam, as well as coverage of the 1973 Yom Kippur War.

== Breast cancer advocacy ==
After Rose Kushner's June 1974 discovery of a cancerous lump in her breast, breast cancer became the focus of her life. On the basis of her library research into breast cancer treatment, she objected to the treatment which was then standard, in which a tumor biopsy and radical mastectomy were performed in a single surgical operation while the patient was under anesthesia. However, she had difficulty finding a doctor who would perform a diagnostic biopsy and allow her to decide what action to take next. After a biopsy determined that her tumor was cancerous, she resisted the then-standard radical mastectomy procedure, in which muscle tissue and lymph nodes were removed along with the breast. In order to have a less invasive procedure, she traveled from her Kensington, Maryland home to Buffalo, New York, where she had found a doctor (Dr. Thomas Dao) who was willing to do a modified radical mastectomy.

As Kushner recovered from her surgery, she started writing about her experiences with breast cancer. She was outspoken in her criticism of Betty Ford's September 1974 treatment for breast cancer, using personal connections in Washington, DC, in an unsuccessful effort to convince the First Lady not to undergo a one-step biopsy and radical mastectomy. After being told that "the President has made his decision" (regarding his wife's medical treatment) she railed against the "male-chauvinist-piggery" represented by that statement, writing in a letter: "That statement has got to be engraved somewhere as the all-time sexist declaration of no-woman rights."

Her first major article on the topic of breast cancer was published in The Washington Post on October 6, 1974. She traveled to Europe to learn about breast cancer treatment there, finding that the radical mastectomy was not used as widely as in the United States. Upon her return home, she started a book about the causes, diagnosis, and treatment of breast cancer, completing the manuscript in just seven weeks. The book, published in 1975 under the title Breast Cancer: A Personal History and Investigative Report, contained extensive medical information and advice for patients, including strong criticism of radical mastectomies and the practice of performing a biopsy and a mastectomy as a one-step surgical procedure. In her critique of prevalent medical practices she used rhetoric familiar to the 1970s feminist movement, with statements such as "No man is going to make another impotent while he's asleep without his permission, but there's no hesitation if it's a woman's breast." The book was strongly endorsed by Dr. Dao, who had conducted research on breast cancer treatment and had performed Rose Kushner's surgery, but it was widely criticized by other doctors and the American Cancer Society.

In 1975 Kushner and Dorothy Johnston, established a telephone hotline called the Breast Cancer Advisory Center, based in Kensington, Maryland, that operated until 1982, responding to calls and letters from thousands of women wanting information about breast cancer and its treatment. The center's establishment was motivated in part by Kushner's desire to promote patient self-help and mutual support, thus displacing the medical profession and the American Cancer Society from their roles as information "gatekeepers".

Kusher became a relentless critic of the treatment of breast cancer by the medical profession. She attended numerous meetings of medical professionals, interrupting presentations, questioning conclusions, and speaking against the prevalent practices of one-step breast cancer surgery and radical mastectomy. In 1975 she was "booed off the stage" at a meeting of the Society of Surgical Oncology, whose members objected to her challenges to traditional treatments.

In spite of her unpopularity with the mainstream medical profession, Kushner's work was well received in the public and won increasing respect in official circles. In June 1977, she was the only lay member appointed to a ten-member National Institutes of Health (NIH) panel that evaluated treatment options for primary breast cancer. In 1979, the panel issued its findings, concluding that the Halsted radical mastectomy should no longer be the standard treatment for suspected cases of breast cancer, instead recommending total simple mastectomy as the primary surgical treatment. Additionally, Kushner convinced her fellow panel members to include a statement calling for an end to the one-step surgical procedure. At the time of her death, Dr. Bruce A. Chabner of the National Cancer Institute said she was "probably the single most important person" in ending the practice of one-step surgery for breast cancer, because of her persistence and because she brought medical information to a wide public audience that otherwise might have remained unaware of the options.

Following her service on the NIH panel, President Jimmy Carter appointed Kushner to the National Cancer Advisory Board as the board's first lay member, and she was engaged by the NIH to review grant applications. She took pleasure in the fact that she was working within the system, joking "I'm a full-fledged member of the Establishment."

After Kushner's cancer recurred in 1981, she refused chemotherapy, which she considered to be unacceptably toxic, and was treated with tamoxifen. In the 1980s she campaigned against aggressive use of chemotherapy. In a 1984 article "Is Aggressive Adjuvant Chemotherapy the Halsted Radical of the '80s?" she suggested that chemotherapy was being used as indiscriminately as radical mastectomy surgery had been in earlier decades, saying that doctors gave insufficient attention to the serious side effects of chemotherapy, and calling chemotherapy "therapeutic overkill." Barron Lerner has suggested that the vehemence of her attack on chemotherapy may have reflected a conflict of interest, related both to her personal interest in the implications of her own decision to refuse chemotherapy and a "close working and financial relationship with the manufacturers of tamoxifen."

She continued to advocate for the interests of breast cancer patients for the rest of her life. In 1986 she was a cofounder of the National Alliance of Breast Cancer Organizations, an umbrella organization on whose board she served from 1986 to 1989. In 1989 she was appointed to the Breast Cancer Task Force of the American Cancer Society. Up until a few days before her death in 1990, at the age of 60, she was actively lobbying for the U.S. federal government to require health insurance to cover mammograms.

== Works ==
The following are among Rose Kushner's published writings:

- Kushner, Rose (1977), Why Me? What Every Woman Should Know About Breast Cancer To Save Her Life (originally published in 1975 as Breast Cancer: A Personal History and Investigative Report). ISBN 0-451-07692-3, ISBN 0-451-07692-3
- Kushner, Rose (1979), "If You've Thought About Breast Cancer..." (brochure), American Cancer Society, District of Columbia Division. Rose created and wrote the first six editions of this series, which was continued by the National Cancer Institute.
- Kushner, Rose (1984), Is Aggressive Adjuvant Chemotherapy the Halsted Radical of the '80s?, CA Cancer J Clin 1984; 34:345-351. doi:10.3322/canjclin.34.6.345
- Kushner, Rose (1985), Alternatives: New Developments in the War Against Breast Cancer, Warner Books. ISBN 0446345873, ISBN 978-0-446-34587-3, ISBN 0-446-34587-3

== Awards and recognitions ==
Kushner received awards from the American Medical Writers Association in 1980 and 1985 for her books and articles about breast cancer. The American Cancer Society honored her with its Medal of Honor in 1987 and its Courage Award in 1988.

In 1990 she was the posthumous recipient of the James Ewing Award of the Society of Surgical Oncology, recognizing outstanding contributions by a lay person to the fight against cancer.
