= Memphis Center for Reproductive Health =

Health center in Memphis, Tennessee, U.S.

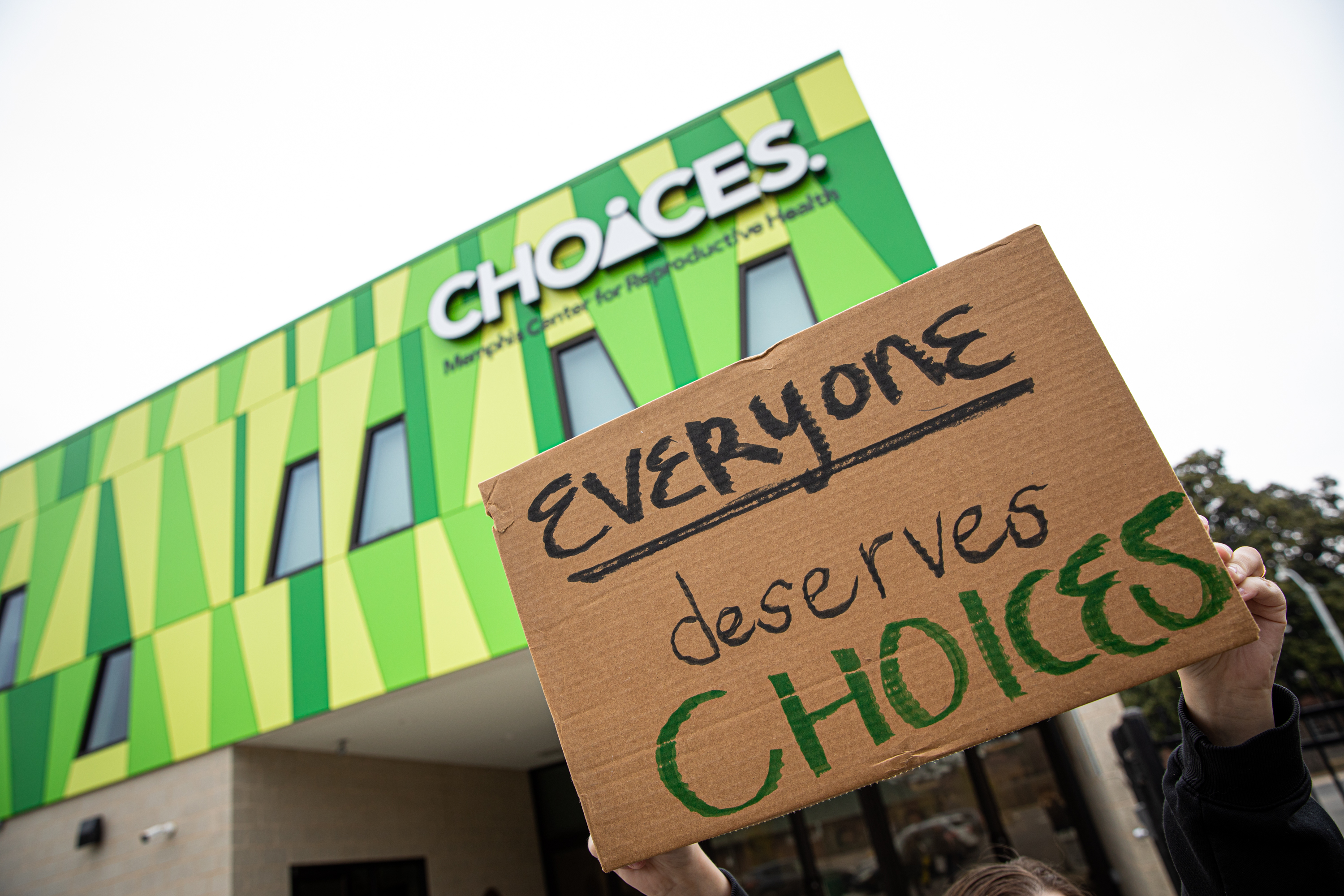
CHOICES' Memphis clinic, located at 1203 Poplar Avenue.

CHOICES Center for Reproductive Health is an independent, nonprofit reproductive and sexual health provider and was the first abortion clinic in Memphis, Tennessee.

== History ==
=== Early history ===
CHOICES was founded by Priscilla Chism in 1974 under the name Memphis Center for Reproductive Health just after the US Supreme Court's historic Roe v Wade decision. There were no other abortion providers in Memphis at the time. The clinic was originally located in a building across the street from the Greyhound bus terminal in downtown Memphis. Within 18 months, a foundation loan allowed the clinic to move to a remodeled former private home in Midtown Memphis.

In the early years following the Roe v. Wade decision there was prominent public support for the provision of quality abortion services. Abortion was viewed, even in Tennessee, as a matter of women's public health. The staff of the center included graduate students, several on internships, from the University of Tennessee Center for the Health Sciences, the University of Memphis, and Rhodes College. CHOICES had a very prominent profile in the community, with an advisory committee of eminent leaders, professors, and officials. The center was very actively called on by the media and had extensive speaking engagements and a high profile at public schools and universities on a wide variety of topics related to women's health and sexuality.

The most prominent program it helped develop beyond its core medical services was the Memphis Sexual Assault Resources Center (now Shelby County CVRCC). This pioneered nationally the creation of the role of the Sexual Assault Nurse Examiner (SANE), whose role included on call 24/7 services for victims of sexual assault, crisis counseling, prophylactic care to avoid pregnancy and STDs, expert collection of forensic evidence, expert testimony in prosecutions, and ongoing counseling. Priscilla Chism and Brenda A. Brown of the Memphis Police Department conceptualized and co-authored, with the endorsement of Mayor Chandler and Gen. Jay Hubbard, Chief of Police, a grant which gained funding through DHEW. In its first year of services, the rates of sexual assault cases dropped for lack of prosecution declined by 60 percent. The funding was obtained with the help of Senator Howard Baker, and the support of many prominent Memphians.

=== 2000–2010 ===
In the early 2000s, CHOICES started expanding its services beyond abortion. The clinic began offering family planning, HIV testing and prevention, LGBTQ-inclusive fertility counseling, and gender-affirming hormone therapy for transgender patients. In May 2010 under the direction of its new executive director Rebecca Terrell, CHOICES received its first large philanthropic investment: a $150,000 grant from the MAC AIDS Fund. Also in 2010, CHOICES moved to a new and more prominent location on Poplar Avenue in Memphis. The organization underwent a rebranding along with the move; previously called The Memphis Center for Reproductive Health, "CHOICES" was selected as an easier-to-remember title.

=== 2010–2020 ===
As patient numbers and community needs continued to grow, CHOICES’ leadership began to envision a unique model that included both birth and abortion care. In 2015, the executive staff and board of directors embarked on a plan to provide innovative, comprehensive sexual and reproductive health care that included services for people throughout their lifespan. CHOICES' leaders recognized that abortion was often needlessly siloed from other reproductive care. In 2017, CHOICES purchased property to build a new health and birth center that would include out-of-hospital births and perinatal care under the midwifery model, abortion services, testing and treatment for sexually transmitted infections, LGBTQ-inclusive sexual health services with an emphasis on serving communities with the least access to care. Dr. Nikia Grayson, a certified nurse midwife, anthropologist, and public health professional, joined CHOICES in 2017 to implement midwifery care at the organization.

=== 2020–present ===
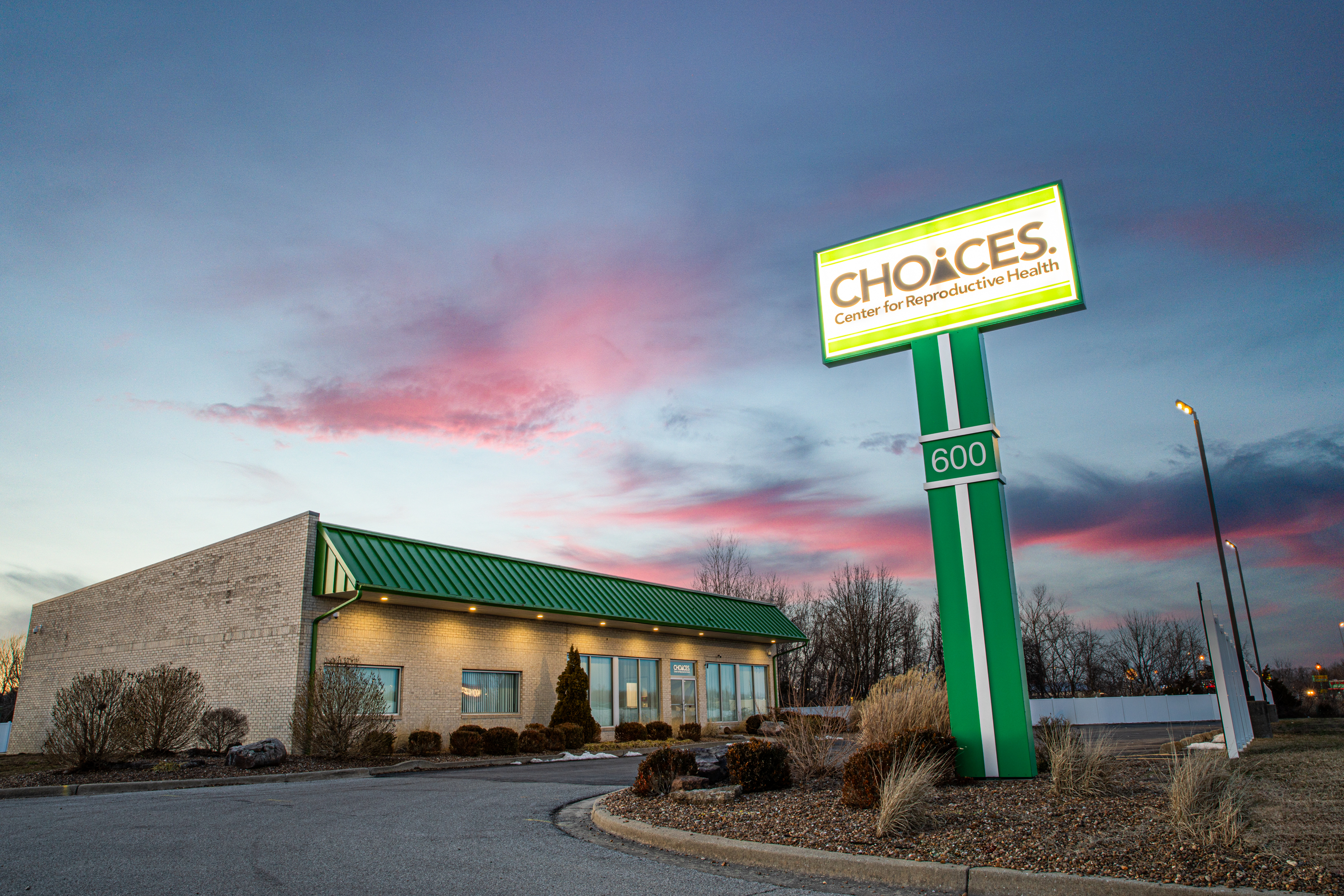
CHOICES' Carbondale clinic, opened in 2022.

In 2020, CHOICES moved into its new health and birth center in Memphis. CHOICES is the only out-of-hospital birth center in the Memphis and Mid-South region. The organization was also the only nonprofit, non-hospital entity in the nation to offer both abortion and birth services under one roof. In 2021, Jennifer Pepper took over as President and CEO of CHOICES. The organization announced its new Center of Excellence Nurse Midwifery Fellowship Program in 2021. The fellowship was designed for recent Black midwife graduates with the goal of increasing the number of Black midwives in the United States, particularly in the South.

In May 2022, upon the impending Dobbs vs Jackson Women's Health Organization decision, CHOICES announced it would open a second clinic in Carbondale, Illinois to continue providing abortion services for people across the Southeast once abortion would no longer be legal in Tennessee. CHOICES' Carbondale clinic opened in October 2022. CHOICES' Memphis clinic remains open for all other services, including perinatal and birth services, sexual wellness, gender-affirming hormone therapy, and HIV testing and prevention.

== Controversy and criticism ==
Like many other abortion providers, CHOICES has experienced anti-abortion protestors, vandalism, and threats of violence throughout its history. In 2009, shortly after the murder of George Tiller, a bomb threat brought the police to CHOICES, but no bomb was found on the premises.
