= Belita Cowan =

American women's health activist

Belita Cowan was a women's health activist during the 1960s and 1970s. She was born on June 1st, 1947, and currently lives in Ann Arbor, Michigan. She attended the University of Michigan in Ann Arbor. She worked part-time at the University Hospital while finishing her master's degree in English. Cowan started her research as a result of how horrified she was by the false advertising of the morning after pill. She was invited to present her research findings at the Senate hearing on DES in 1974. This made her the first women's health activist to ever testify as an expert witness.

== Early research and activism ==
In 1969, when Cowan was working at the University Hospital in Ann Arbor, Michigan, she began researching the effects of diethylstilbestrol (DES), which was also known as the "morning after" pill. The goal of her research was to look into the side effects that were caused by this drug. Many scientific articles that wrote about DES claimed that it was completely safe and effective. Even studies done by the University Hospital showed that none of the thousands of women surveyed reported side effects. However, Cowan had heard from her friends that the pill caused severe nausea for a short period of time and some cases of pregnancy that lead to children with cancer. Knowing this, Cowan brought together a group of women former patients at the University of Michigan's student health center and organized Advocates for Medical Information. This group aimed to educate women in the side effects of the DES pill and to oppose the use of it at the University Hospital and other health centers in the country. In 1971, the organization received a grant from the student government to undertake a survey of women who had taken DES. Out of the sixty-nine women who responded, only a quarter of them were contacted by doctors after taking the medication. This proved that the advertisements for the drug DES was fraudulent. After concluding her research about the horrific side effects of diethylstilbestrol (DES), Cowan believed that women around the country should know about the fraudulent drug. She contacted Ralph Nader and other feminists to prepare for a press conference in Washington D.C. in December 1972. Immediately after her press conference, the dangers of DES made it into national news.

== Accomplishments ==
In 1974, Belita Cowan, Barbara Seaman, Phyllis Chesler, Mary Howell, and Alice Wolfson established the National Women's Health Network. This was a non-profit organization based in Washington, D.C. that aimed to give women a louder voice in the healthcare system. Later in 1974, she was invited to present her research findings at the House and Senate hearings on DES. This made her the first women's health activist to ever testify as an expert witness. In 1978, she became the National Women's Health Network's first Executive Director. In her time in this position, she brought the NWHN into many important health issues including taking legal action against the manufacturers of the Dalkon Shield for their product injuring many women, challenging the Hyde Amendment, and sponsoring the first national conference on Black Women's Health. In 1983, Cowan retired as Executive Director of NWHN. In 1986, Cowan founded the first Lymphomas support group in the United States, which then grew into the first national lymphoma organization. In 1989, she founded and became president of the Lymphoma Foundation of America, which is a national charity that is devoted to helping lymphoma patients and families as well as funding research to find a cure.

== Feminist writings ==
In 1972, Cowan created "Her-self" which was a feminist newspaper dedicated to women's health. In 1975, she wrote an excerpt in a women's newsjournal called "Off Our Backs" Here, she addressed the fact that men were controlling women's health and pass laws that effect all women without any input from them. In the past, the FDA has held countless hearings on IUDs, hormone pills, drugs taken during pregnancy, vaginal deodorants, and other over-the-counter pills. These hearings are run by men, attended by men, and men make laws from these hearings. Cowan asks, “Where are the women?”. She wants women who use these products, women doctors, and women's health advocates to come together and make their voices heard. Cowan points out that action can be taken in small steps too. In 1980, Cowan wrote the chapter "Ethical Problems in Government-Funded Contraceptive Research," where she discusses how, since the government plays a major role in the funding of contraceptive development, women need to examine its priorities. Unlike research conducted by private agencies or pharmaceutical companies, American women are directly supporting this work through their tax dollars. Women can step up in their own communities and bring action to the dangers of some drugs and devices given to women.
