= National Women's Health Network =

Women's health advocacy organization

- Abbreviation: NWHN
- Formation: 1975
- Founder: Barbara Seaman; Alice Wolfson; Belita Cowan; Mary Howell; Phyllis Chesler
- Founded at: Washington, D.C.
- Type: non-profit women's health advocacy organization
- Headquarters: Washington, D.C.
- Website: www.nwhn.org

The National Women's Health Network (NWHN) was a non-profit women's health advocacy organization located in Washington, D.C. It was founded in 1975 by Barbara Seaman, Alice Wolfson, Belita Cowan, Mary Howell, and Phyllis Chesler. The stated mission of the organization was to give women a greater voice within the healthcare system. The NWHN researched and lobbied federal agencies on such issues as AIDS, reproductive rights, breast cancer, older women's health, and new contraceptive technologies. The Women's Health Voice, the NWHN's health information program, provided independent research on a variety of women's health topics. In December 2024, the NWHN sunset their operations and shut down after 50 years of advocating for women's health.

== History ==
The NWHN was founded in late 1975 as the National Women's Health Lobby by Barbara Seaman, Alice Wolfson, Belita Cowan, Mary Howell, and Phyllis Chesler. It was created to be both a lobbying organization and to monitor federal legislation and research relating to women's health, Food and Drug Administration (FDA) hearings, and Department of Health, Education and Welfare regulations. By December 1975, the organization was renamed the National Women's Health Network after the group realized that regulatory groups, as opposed to legislative bodies, had more influence on women's health.

The first action of the NWHN was a demonstration held outside of the FDA building in Rockville, Maryland, on December 15 and 16 of that year, in order protest against the FDA's approval and lack of oversight of synthetic estrogens. The protest was planned for those days because two scientific studies done on the risks of estrogenic drugs were about to be published in The New England Journal of Medicine and inside the building, the FDA was going to be holding hearings on the risks of DES (diethylstilbestrol)--formerly prescribed to pregnant women in order to prevent miscarriages and other complications, by 1971 DES had been found to cause a rare cancer, clear-cell adenocarcinoma of the vagina, in women and girls exposed to the drug in utero—and whether to mandate patient packaging inserts for estrogen replacement therapy drugs prescribed to menopausal women. On the outside of the building, the demonstrators held a funeral service to memorialize women who had died after taking drugs containing synthetic estrogens. Speakers discussed the risks of taking medications like DES, the morning-after pill, estrogen replacement therapy for menopausal women, as well as combined oral contraceptive pills. Speakers included Jim Luggen, a widower whose late wife had died of a pulmonary embolism caused by the oral birth control she was taking; Mary Daly, a radical feminist theologian and philosopher; a DES daughter Sherry Leibowitz; and Barbara Seaman. The protest had approximately 100 participants and Richard Crout, the head of FDA Bureau of Drugs at the time, attended.

Participants carried signs reading "Feed Estrogen to the Rats at the FDA" and "Women's Health, Not Drug Company Wealth". After the protests and the Nelson Pill Hearings, Patient Packaging Inserts (PPIs) listing side effects were instated for oral contraceptives—the first PPIs in U.S. history.

With the help of a grant from the Ms. Foundation, the NWMN also became a clearinghouse for women's health information, and continues to provide women with objective health information from a feminist viewpoint.

The NWHN petitioned the FDA in August, 2006 to cease sales of estrogen testosterone combination treatments.

The NWHN Board of Directors included Susan F. Wood, who served as Assistant Commissioner for Women's Health and Director of the Food and Drug Administration (FDA) Office of Women's Health (OWH) from November 2000 through August 2005, when she resigned on principle due to the continued delay of approval of the emergency contraceptive, Plan B.

In 2013, the NWHN joined the All*Above All campaign to lobby for Congress to repeal federal and state restrictions on abortion care coverage.

In 2015, the NWHN began fiscal sponsorship of Plan C, a non-profit organization and campaign for access to medical abortion.

== Values ==
- There is worth in women's personal accounts of their experiences, and health policy should echo women's diverse experiences.
- The normal changes that women experience over their lifetimes should not be over treated.
- Every woman should have access to quality health care.
- Information given to women to direct their health decisions should be motivated by evidence rather than profit.
- Government has the responsibility to provide for the health and welfare of all people.
- Scientific analysis that takes into account systems of oppression and power is valuable to all.

== Raising Women's Voices ==
The National Women's Health Network helped found Raising Women's Voices, a national initiative that advocates affordable healthcare for everyone. Raising Women's Voices wants to ensure the national discourse on healthcare reform takes the needs of women into account. Other founding members include Mergerwatch and the Avery Institute for Social Change. Raising Women's Voices includes a list of 26 principles including:

- High quality health care for all.
- Ensure provision of the full range of reproductive and women's health services. Such services should include, but are not limited to, maternity care, pre- and post-natal care, contraception, abortion, treatment and prevention of sexually transmitted infections, and fertility treatment;
- Include comprehensive dental care for both children and adults.
- Actively address and work to eliminate racial, ethnic, gender and class disparities in health care access, as well as disparities due to immigration status, disabilities and sexual or gender identity.

== Publications ==
=== Fact sheets and position papers ===
The NWHN published independently researched fact sheets and position papers on a variety of women's health topics including breast cancer, endometriosis, cervical cancer, fibroids, menopause and hormonal therapy, mammograms, abortion, and hysterectomy. Every publication is from an objective, feminist perspective without endorsing any specific treatment plan or method.

=== The Women's Health Activist ===
The National Women's Health Network published a bimonthly newsletter, The Women's Health Activist. The Women's Health Activist has been in circulation since 1976, but was known as the Network News up until 2001. The newsletter included articles by NWHN board members, staff members, and contributors from diverse organizations and institutions. Contributors included the National Asian Pacific American Women's Forum, Georgetown University, the National Latina Institute for Reproductive Health, PharmedOut, and SisterLove, Inc.

Content consisted of independently researched articles on current events, health policy, awareness campaigns, informational topics, and medical updates. Articles in the Women's Health Activist spoke out against many government actions including the FDA's re-approval of silicone gel breast implants.
