= Alice Wolfson =

American lawyer and activist

- Education: Barnard College (BA); Fulbright Scholar
- Occupations: Lawyer; activist
- Known for: Women's health
- Awards: Millicent Carey McIntosh Award for Feminism (2021)

Alice Wolfson is an American activist and attorney who specializes in women's health care. A Barnard College graduate and former Fulbright Scholar, she is a veteran political activist in women's reproductive health issues, a lawyer, and a co-founder of the National Women's Health Network.

== Activism ==
Wolfson gained prominence for her role at the Nelson Pill Hearings on Capitol Hill, where she and other soon-to-be prominent health feminists were galvanized by their success at warning women of the Pill's dangerous side effects. Wolfson invited fellow feminist Barbara Seaman to testify at the hearings, and worked with her to eventually form the National Women's Health Network. Wolfson's group consistently made national news at the time, and led to the public's outrage about women's health misconceptions. Wolfson's activism is credited with opening up the Food and Drug Administration (FDA) to consumer observers in order to better ensure that women's health would be addressed. Her efforts also led to the FDA requiring medication package inserts with birth control pills, the first ever prescription drug insert in the United States.

Wolfson is also notable for her discovery on intersectionality between race, class, and healthcare in the late 1960s to early 1970s. Through her efforts in the D.C. Women's Liberation Movement (DCWLM), she was able to realize that women of color and/or women of lower social classes were more likely to seek out unsafe abortion methods because of inequalities in the healthcare system.

In 1968, Wolfson signed the “Writers and Editors War Tax Protest” pledge, vowing to refuse tax payments in protest against the Vietnam War. In 1970, Wolfson was one of 17 women that contributed to writing the first issue of the impactful feminist paper Off Our Backs. In the 1990s, she worked to obtain damages for women adversely affected by breast implants.

Wolfson was featured in the 2014 documentary film She's Beautiful When She's Angry, where she advocated for "changing the whole paradigm" of under-represented women's rights in society.

=== Women's health ===
In the first issue of Off Our Backs, Wolfson writes about how the FDA had suppressed information from a study done about the pill's potentially fatal effects on women, which raised many safety concerns about the contraceptive. Wolfson also argues that the choice of birth control method belongs to the individual woman, as they would be the one affected by its failure. She has stated that the "work and toil put in by her generation" would be undone if Roe v. Wade was ever overturned.

== Awards and honors ==
- Wolfson was the recipitent of the 2021 Millicent Carey McIntosh Award for Feminism

== See also ==
- Birth control in the United States
- Women's liberation movement
