= Doula (disambiguation) =

A doula is an assistant providing non-medical support during and after childbirth.

Doula may also refer to:

- Doula (anatomy) or dulla, a sac that is inflated when the male dromedary is in rut
- Doula (film), a 2022 American comedy film
- Death doula, a person who assists in the dying process
- Abortion doula, a person who provides care before, during, and after an abortion

== People ==
- Doula Mouriki (1934–1991), Greek Byzantinist and art historian
- Siraj ud-Daulah, an eighteenth-century ruler of Bengal, often spelled Siraj-ud-Doula in older literature
- Sayf al-Dawla, a medieval ruler of Aleppo, frequently spelled Saif al Doula

== See also ==
- Douala, a city in Cameroon
- Doulos (disambiguation), the masculine form
