= Sex-selective abortion in South Korea =

Sex-selective abortion is the act of aborting a child due to its predicted sex. This practice gained popularity in the mid-1980s to early 1990s in South Korea, where selective female abortions were commonplace as male children were preferred. As a result, South Koreans aborted a much higher number of female fetuses than male ones in the 1980s and early 1990s. Historically, much of Korea's values and traditions were based on Confucianism, which dictates a patriarchal system, thus motivating the preference for sons over daughters. Additionally, even though the abortion ban existed, the combination of son preference and availability of sex-selective technology led to an increasing number of sex-selective abortions and boys born. As a result, South Korea experienced drastically high sex ratios around mid-1980s to early 1990s. However, in recent years, with the changes in family policies and modernization, attitudes towards son preference have changed, normalizing the sex ratio and lowering the number of sex-selective abortions. Additionally, during the entire 20th century South Korean women benefitted greatly from gender inequality declining at one of the fastest rates worldwide. However, there has been no explicit data collected on the number of induced sex selective abortions performed due to the abortion ban and controversy surrounding the topic. Therefore, scholars have been continuously analyzing and generating connections among sex-selection, abortion policies, gender discrimination, and other cultural factors.

== Reasons for sex-selective abortions ==
=== Cultural preference ===
During Joseon dynasty, Confucianism greatly influenced traditions and values in South Korea. Confucianism emphasizes respecting elders and upholds the traditional idea of the father to be the head of the household and bear the responsibilities of taking care of the family. Thus, this began the tradition of a patriarchal family lineage. In Korea, there is a popular saying, samjongjido, which translate to the idea that women follow three people in their lives: her father, her husband, and her son. As a result, women were often pressured by their family members and in-laws to give birth to sons that will take care of the family in the future and continue the family bloodline as daughters typically end up marrying into different families, with less of an opportunity to take care of her own parents. This corresponds to another famous saying, cheolgawein meaning when a girl marries, she becomes an outsider to her biological family. Additionally, she remains an outsider to her husband's family as well until she bears a son. Historically, when an emperor's wife did not bear the royal family a son, the emperor took on more concubines to increase the chances of producing a son. Thus, this marginalization of women into these subordinate roles with increased pressure to reproduce and give birth to sons perpetuated gender discrimination and son preference, ultimately leading to an increase in female selective abortions in South Korea during the mid-1980s.

These cultural preferences continue to affect South Korean families years after the influence of Confucianism. In 1999, surveys have shown that 78% of Korean men and 70% of Korean women felt that having a son is necessary and desirable. While the rate of sex-selective abortions have slowed down after mid-1990s, gender discrimination and desire for sons prevailed. With that being said, with modernization, a series of law changes, and influence of western values in the early 2000s, attitudes towards traditional beliefs loosened. Younger generations were displaying more interest and preference for daughters for greater emotional connections, resulting in less prevalent sex-selective abortions and normalizing sex ratios.

=== Population control policy and family law ===
In 1948, abortion was prohibited by law and critically observed. Later in 1961, South Korea implemented a population control policy, in hopes of curtailing the growing population and decreasing unwanted pregnancies. The government campaigned this through slogans promoting small families and decrease in poverty rates. However, with the criminalization of abortion, many women turned to induced abortions. Despite the legalities, clinics that performed abortions were prevalent throughout the country. Thus, the availability of abortions, with the combination of motivation from the government to have fewer children and traditional patriarchal lineage preferences, many families opted to have sons rather than daughters.

Family registries in South Korea adopted the Hojuje (male headship system) until 2005. Any son or daughter that is born to a family, was listed under the father in the family registry. As a result, children born to single, unmarried mothers were often pressured to be listed under a male relative in order to have a place in the official family registry or risk being unlisted. For that reason, many families would rather have a son to indefinitely continue the family line than a daughter who might not hold that power. This changed in 2005 when the mandatory patrilineal lineage system was abolished, loosening the need for a son in the family. The sex of the child did not make such a pertinent impact on the succession of the family now and this contributed to the normalizing sex ratio and decrease in pressure for women to bear sons.

== Human birth sex ratio ==
The increase in sex-selective abortions led to a distorted human sex ratio, that shot up to 108.6 in 1985 and 112.5 in 1990. These distortions had significant social and cultural effects on the demographics of South Korea. Infant and child mortality may have had an effect on the high sex ration but the data is not significant enough to label it as a reliable reason for the high sex ratio as there were very few (9.9 in 1000 births in 1985) reported.

=== Regional differences ===
Although, these distortions varied across different cities and provinces. High sex ratio was more common in the south-eastern part of the Korean peninsula. Youngnam, while less so in the south-western part of the peninsula, Honam. Reasons for this may be that Youngnam has fewer Protestant and Catholic churches, which are generally opposed to abortion rights, and has a long history of conservative cultural traditions. On the other hand, Honam is poor in terms of economic prosperity and political power compared to Youngnam, thus more likely to accept western values and new ideology. The author emphasizes that the religion of a given region is a factor in sex-selective abortions in South Korea. Buddhism is more similar to Confucianism and one study concluded that Korean Buddhism is positively associated with the sex ratio at birth. However, later data depicts weaker effects of religion on sex ratio after 2000, with an overall decrease in sex ratio as well.

Additionally, around 1985, sex ratios at birth rose sharply, particularly in Taegu and Pusan cities. The rural areas around them also exhibited a high sex ratio but at a slower pace. Taegu is fairly conservative with a history boasting three generals. Therefore, son preference is particularly strong there. Sex-selective abortion procedures also require fetal sex screening that is very expensive in South Korea and requires extensive medical equipment. As a result, a possible explanation for the lag in rising in rural areas may be due to lack of medical facilities in rural areas to determine the sex of fetus.

== Societal implications ==
=== Consequences of high sex ratio ===
With greater male births to female births, there is a fear of a shortage of brides in South Korea. Young rural men are having more difficulty finding wives due to majority of young women going to urban areas for better employment and quality of life. However, further studies have found that this phenomenon may be more likely due to the overall declining fertility levels in South Korea in the recent years, rather than sex-selective abortions.

Another negative social implication may be the increased use of pornography due to rarity of women and greater sex related crimes of violence targeting women. With a greater scarcity of women, men may be more inclined and desperate to seek out female partners.

Data has shown that small families usually consisted of more sons while larger families have more daughters. The continuation of this trend may widen the social gap between males and females in which sons in small families will have more resources and more advantageous opportunities than daughters in larger families where there are less resources. However, this may also not be as prevalent in South Korea where kinship and sibling support is strongly encouraged.

=== Possible positive effects ===
With sex-selective abortion, there is a reduction in the number of unwanted children, preventing post neonatal infant mortality and abuse of girls.

== Sex-selection technology and methods ==
=== Prenatal sex screening ===
In 1987, fetal screening was only legal for detection of genetic problems and monitoring fetal growth but banned for the sole purpose of prenatal sex screenings. Techniques included chronic villus sampling, amniocentesis, and ultrasounds. However, since there were no substantive penalties for prenatal sex screenings besides a fine, many families were still finding ways to screen for their baby's sex. Additionally, fetal screening for medical purposes often inevitably show the sex of the baby as a byproduct. Scholars have made a connection between the emergence of ultrasound and sex screening technologies in the mid-1980s to the large increase in male births between 1985 and 1995. In response to the high sex ratios, the government sharpened the penalties and in 1990, they arrested and suspended the medical licenses of physicians that performed these sex determination tests on fetuses. Each selective abortion required at least two tests of sex determination and these tests were often very expensive. Thus, not every women had equal opportunities to health care and abortion options. In combination with the high price of fetal screening and heightened penalties, the sex ratios began to lower and normalize after 1995, suggesting lower rates of sex-selective abortions during that time.

=== Abortion methods ===
Due to the criminalization of abortion in South Korea, many women had to find ways around the law to receive an abortion. However, this wasn't as difficult as it may have seemed. Numerous clinics across Korea secretly performed abortions. Despite possible health complications that could arise from receiving fast and cheap abortion procedures, women still sought out these clinics. Oftentimes, women would have an induced abortion early in pregnancy under the name of "menstrual extraction" in which a vacuum is used to suck the fetus out of the womb during the first trimester, resulting in heavy bleeding. This procedure is controversial because it is performed without full certainty that the woman is actually pregnant since it is done so early in the term. Due to this, this process escapes the legalities behind abortion and is accepted in South Korea as part of "family planning" and "public health" services. Scholars have noted that this accessibility of abortions perpetuated the continued performance of sex-selective abortions during the mid-1980s to 1990s.

== See also ==
- Sex-selective abortion in Taiwan
- Female infanticide
- Low birth rate in South Korea
