= Hysterotomy =

Incision made in the uterus

- ICD-9-CM: 68.0
- MeSH: D020883

A hysterotomy is an incision made in the uterus. This surgical incision is used in several medical procedures, including during termination of pregnancy in the second trimester (or abortion) and delivering the fetus during caesarean section. It is also used to gain access and perform surgery on a fetus during pregnancy to correct birth defects, and it is an option to achieve resuscitation if cardiac arrest occurs during pregnancy and it is necessary to remove the fetus from the uterus.

There are several types of incisions that can be made, including a midline vertical incision and a low transverse incision. The incision is made using a scalpel and is about 1-2 cm long, but it can be longer depending on the procedure that is performed. Other types of incisions are low transverse incision with T-extension in the midline, low transverse incision with J-extension, and low transverse incision with U-extension. These are used when low transverse incisions do not provide enough space in order to remove the contents in the uterus.

This incision also comes with possible risks and complications when the incision is made and during repair, including blood loss (possibly leading to anemia), wound infection, fertility problems, premature labor, postoperative pain, and many others. In addition, a rare form of ectopic pregnancy known as scar ectopic pregnancy can occur. This is when there is abnormal implantation of an embryo onto the scar of the uterus. There is an increased risk of this complication occurring due to trauma from previous procedures utilizing hysterotomies, such as caesarean section and dilation, though the mechanism is unknown. Closure of the hysterotomy incision made can be done with either a staple or a suture. Sutures are most commonly used, specifically double layer sutures.

== Medical uses ==
=== Hysterotomy abortion ===
A hysterotomy is used to remove a fetus from the uterus, similar to a procedure known as caesarean section, in order to terminate a pregnancy in the second trimester of later. It is typically used as last resort if dilation and curettage, dilation and electric vacuum aspiration, or manual vacuum aspiration fails to work. Dilation and curettage refers to the opening or widening of the cervix and scooping and scraping the tissues that are inside of the uterus. Electric vacuum aspiration utilizes a vacuum to remove the embryo that is in the uterus, but this method is more expensive than manual vacuum aspiration.

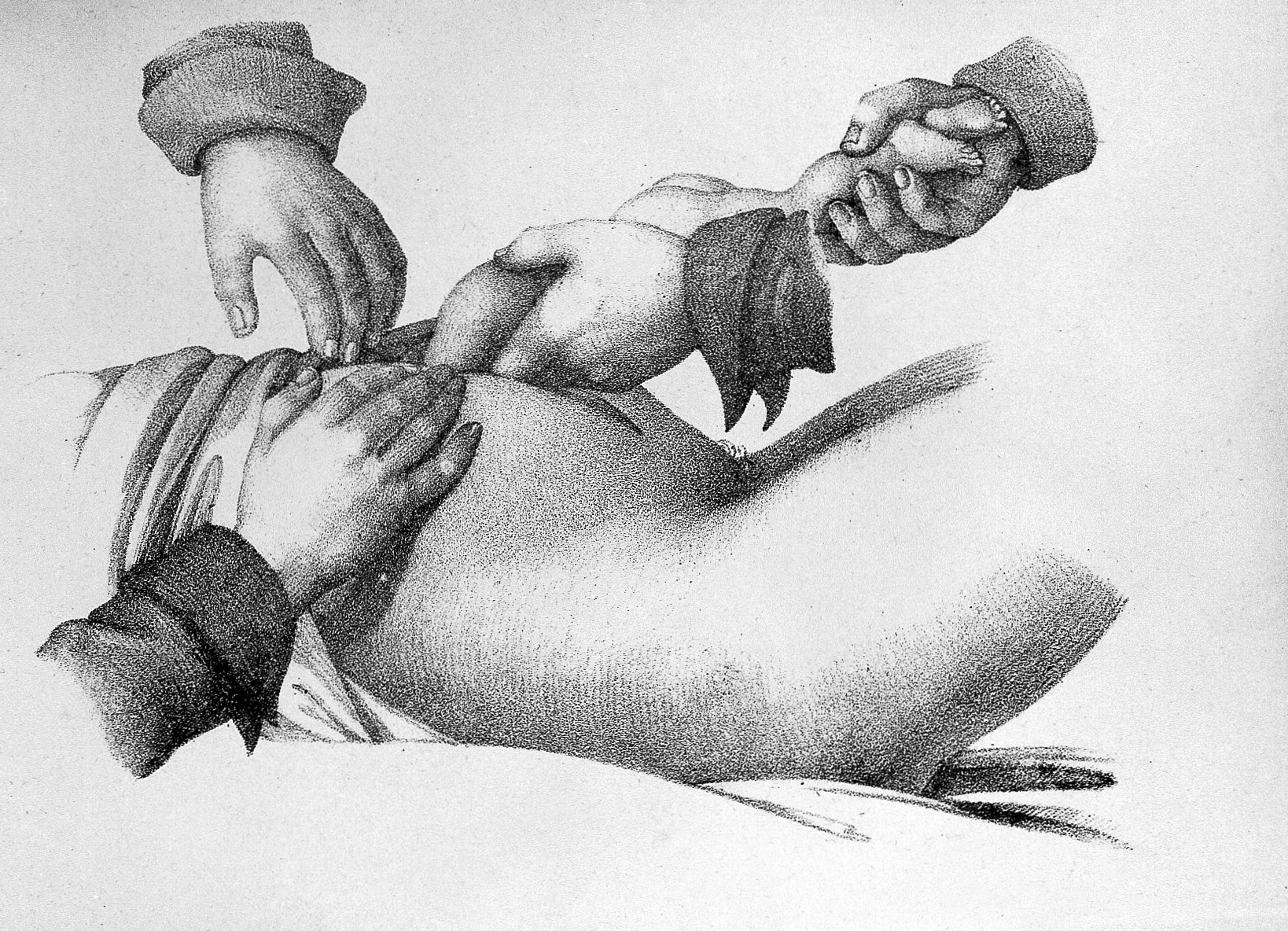
Caesarean section operation

=== Caesarean section ===
Although fetal delivery through caesarean section is a very common surgery done in the world, it comes with several risks including bleeding, infection, thromboembolism, and soft-tissue injury. During a caesarean section, a hysterotomy is utilized to make an incision in the uterus and remove the fetus. Gestational age, newborn birth weight, and danger presenting risks are all taken into account on whether or not a classic hysterotomy or low transverse incision will be made.

=== Resuscitative hysterotomy ===
A resuscitative hysterotomy is performed during or near the occurrence of a cardiac arrest, in which an incision is made to remove the fetus from the uterus. This is done in order to save the fetus, as well as to revive the woman whose uterus was carrying the fetus. This is traditionally done if the fetus is of 24 weeks or older, at which it is viable outside of the uterus. The primary goal is to save the pregnant woman, and in order to ensure the highest survival rate, the goal of fetus delivery time is within 5 minutes after the patient goes under arrest and/or two cycles of CPR. During pregnancy, the pregnant uterus may compress the inferior vena cava and abdominal aorta, causing reduced blood flow to the uterus and to the pregnant woman. Removing the fetus can restore blood flow to the pregnant person.

=== Fetal surgery ===
Hysterotomy is a technique used during fetal surgery to access the fetus in the pregnant uterus in order to treat a birth defect such as spina bifida. A standard hysterotomy remains the gold-standard for the closure of a fetal spina bifida because it is the safest and most effective when compared to mini-hysterectomies and a percutaneous two-layer fetoscopy. A mini-hysterotomy procedure is favored for extreme cases of preterm delivery and any complications regarding maternal, fetal, and/or neonatal because of the reduced risks and complications.

== Risks and complications ==
The technique used to repair the hysterotomy is dependent on the surgeon's preference. The method of repair and type of suture affects the risks and complications of receiving a hysterotomy. Hysterotomy incision repair can be done within the intraperitoneal space (in situ) or the uterus can be temporarily removed for repair (exteriorization). Both types of uterine positioning for repair yielded similar lengths of hospital stay, risk of infection, and estimated blood loss. Recovery following uterine exteriorization was found to induce more nausea and be more painful, requiring more post-operative analgesia. Return of bowel function was faster with in situ repair. It was found that between unlocked single-layer closure and double-layer closure, there is no difference in risk of uterine rupture, however the risk of rupture is increased with a locked single-layer suture.

Following the repair of the incision, a scar defect may form, which is defined as a thinning of uterine muscle at the incision site. These uterine scar defects are associated with increased risk of uterine rupture and scar separation. Scar defects may increase the risk of complications such as abnormal bleeding, pain, ectopic pregnancy, and infertility.

=== During caesarean section ===
Caesarean sections require a large incision of the uterus, which can lead to complications such as blood loss, postoperative pain, anaemia due to continuing blood loss, fever and possible wound infection, breastfeeding issues, difficulty passing urine, future fertility problems, and/or possible complications in future pregnancies including uterine rupture.

=== During fetal surgery ===
In fetal surgery, without inhibition of uterine contractions, uterine irritability and premature labor are complications that occur very frequently in of hysterotomy cases. It can be inhibited by anti-contraction medications. Preterm birth and early membrane rupture (PPROM) are common risks for fetal therapies. For most cases, fetoscopic surgery, which minimizes the damage to the uterus, is preferred to mitigate risks and complications. Membrane sealing and fixation has been investigated for reducing PPROM risk, but it has not been found to be clinically beneficial.

=== Scar ectopic pregnancy ===
Scar ectopic pregnancy is a rare form of ectopic pregnancy, however, when it does occur it causes complications in pregnancy such as abnormal uterine bleeding and uterine rupture. The mechanism of how scar ectopic pregnancy still remains unknown. However, the possibility that defects may form to the scarring from previous procedures/traumas such as caesarean section, dilation, hysterotomy, abnormal placentation can cause scar ectopic pregnancy.

=== Hysterotomy abortion ===
There are two categories of complications with surgical abortions, minor and major. Minor complications are procedural pain, bleeding, infection and common anesthesia complications. The more serious and major complications include hemorrhage, sepsis, peritonitis, deep vein thrombosis and death.

== Types ==
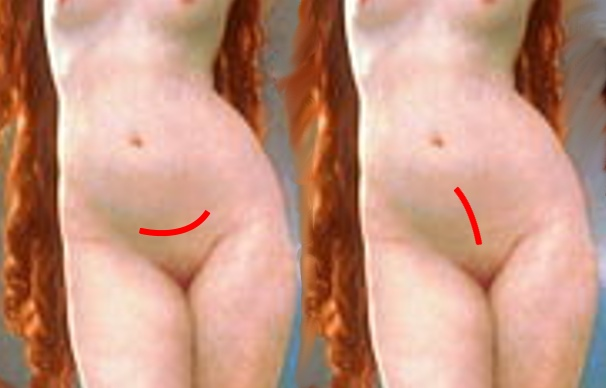
Location of a low transverse incision and midline vertical incision

There are many different types of hysterotomies depending on the location and direction of the incision. Typically, a low transverse incision is preferred during a caesarean section. This area of the uterus has less vasculature and therefore provides lower risk of hemorrhage during the procedure for the patient. Incisions in the lower area of the uterus is also associated with lower risks of uterine rupture. There may be times in which the lower transverse incision does not provide adequate space and therefore, expansions of the low transverse incisions have led to the creation of the low transverse incision with T-extension in the midline, low transverse incision with J-extension, and low transverse incision with U-extension. A low vertical incision and a midline incision, also known as a classic caesarean incision, may be preferred during a labor that is preterm. Since the lower uterine segment is not yet fully developed during a preterm labor, these two incisions are preferred in order to provide adequate space for manipulations during delivery of the fetus. A low transverse incision would not provide adequate space and could entrap the fetal head therefore risking intercranial hemorrhage, morbidity and mortality for the fetus. A midline incision may be preferred as well when the fetus lies transversely across the patient's uterus or if the placenta lies in the area where the low transverse incision is made. In practice, however, the midline incision is rarely used. Other hysterotomy incisions include a high transverse incision and a fundal incision. A fundal incision may be used if the placenta is placed behind the anterior wall of the uterus and therefore making typical incisions much more risky for hemorrhage.

== Techniques ==
=== Incision ===
A hysterotomy can be performed by various methods. Typically a small incision is made with a scalpel about 1–2 cm long. During a blunt expansion, the incision is expanded by the surgeon's index fingers or other blunt dissection tools. During a sharp expansion, bandage scissors are used to cut a larger incision. Some professionals will say that the sharp expansion allows for a more controlled entry into the uterus and a faster delivery of the fetus. Other professionals will say the blunt expansion allows for reduced risk of hemorrhaging or excessive bleeding and improves healing for the patient.

=== Closure ===
A hysterotomy is completed by closing the uterus either by using a stapler or by suture, no significant differences have been noted to show one technique takes precedent over another. The muscular outer layer of the uterus in all samples of closures showed some inflammation and thickening/scarring of the tissue. In the event a midline incision is used, three layers of sutures are performed to repair the uterine wall. An interrupted suture is used to close the first and second layer and a continuous locking suture or figure-of-eight suture is used to close the third layer. Since in practice the low transverse incision is typically made, the incision is also typically closed with two layers of sutures. Though, there is a debate on whether the suture should be close with a single layer or a double layer of sutures. Double layer of sutures can promote improved healing, hemostasis and less risk of uterine rupture in the next pregnancy, whereas single layer of sutures allows for less operation time, less tissue disruption and decreased exposure to foreign suture material.

== See also ==
- Hysterotomy abortion
- Resuscitative hysterotomy
- List of surgeries by type
