= Son preference in China =

Gender preference issue in China

Son preference in China is a gender preference issue underpinned by the belief that boys have more value than girls. In China, the bias towards male over female offspring is demonstrated by the sex ratio at birth (SRB).

Key factors driving the son preference include the economic impact on families, since men are expected to care for their parents in old age, while women are not. Further, Chinese agrarian society influences sex preference, as agriculture is often perceived as men's work in China.

These issues were dramatically compounded by the implementation of the Chinese Communist Party's one-child rule in 1979.

== History ==
The origin of the son preference can be related to the beginning of Chinese patriarchal society. Agriculture is also a key factor in the historical preference for sons. For thousands of years in China, most people preferred sons to daughters because of their perceived greater earning potential, especially in agrarian communities where strength-based tasks such as hunting, animal husbandry, and plowing are major sources of income.

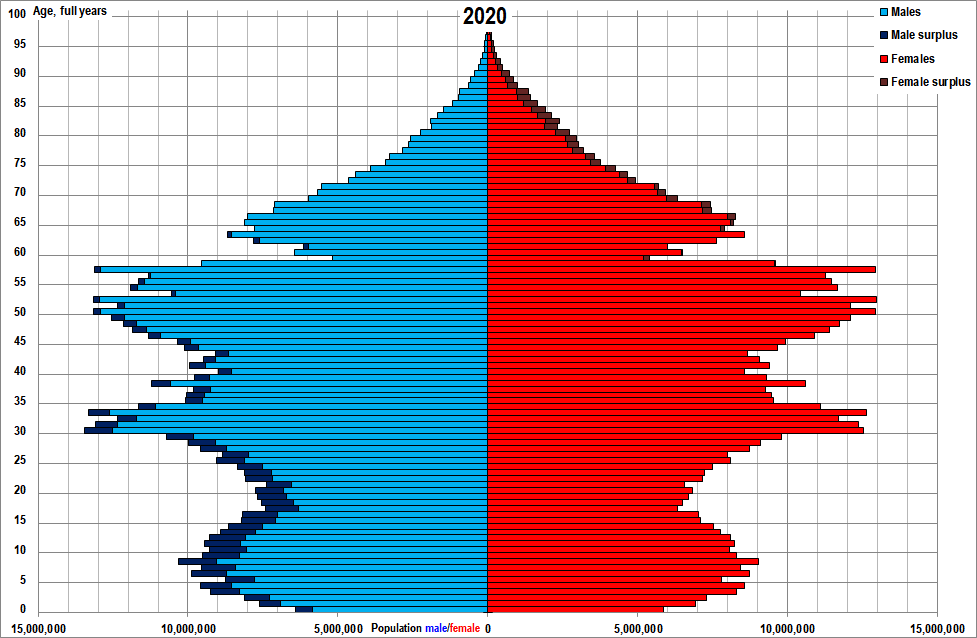
Population pyramid of China (as of 2020) showing surplus sex by age cohorts. Many countries show a similar trend; Canada for example, shows a similar though less pronounced tendency.

In traditional Chinese religious practice, males are preferred because they have the ability to continue the family line. Further, women are not traditionally responsible for their parents when they marry, while men are expected to care for parents in their old age. The ideas of male superiority and female inferiority have existed in patriarchal societies for considerable time. With the development of feudal ethics, this viewpoint gradually developed and became culturally entrenched.

Among the folk practices in China prior to the founding of the People's Republic of China (PRC) was the use of a shaman's charm to destroy the "Curse of Nine-Daughters".

Also prior to the founding of the PRC, certain aspects of taijiao (fetal education) were believed to help ensure a fetus would be male, and pregnant women might visit also a fortune teller in an effort to determine fetal sex.

In the PRC, local government bureaus and work units composed cultural works such as songs and dramas in an effort to overturn traditional cultural practices deemed inconsistent with modernization, namely the traditional son preference and trends of marrying earlier and having larger families. Organized group conversations and cultural activities were also used to challenge these traditional preferences and achieved some success.

The traditional son preference in China has contributed to sex-selective abortions following the development of ultrasound machines in the 1980s and China's one-child policy. In 1986, the National Commission for Family Planning and the Ministry of Health prohibited prenatal sex determination except when diagnosing hereditary diseases.Individuals or clinics that violate the prohibition are subject to fines. This prohibition was repeatedly affirmed in the 1980s, 1990s, and early 2000s. Since the 1990s, government efforts to eliminate the traditional son preference and to promote son/daughter equality in family planning have increased. They further accelerated after the United Nations-sponsored Caring for Girls national campaign in 2003.

== Reasons ==
=== Agrarian society ===
Prior to globalization, during the Song, Ming and Qing dynasties, China was an agrarian society. The majority of work in agriculture was deemed to utilize males’ strength. Although the expansionary of urbanisation has increased in recent decades throughout China, agriculture still plays a role in gender bias. These cultural norms are deeply entrenched. Despite rapid development to the Chinese economy, many farmers who move from rural areas to cities still prefer sons; in Chinese social culture, sons are expected to take more responsibility to take on households.

=== Financial security ===
Financial security is another factor that affects sex preference in China. Traditionally, once a girl is married, she becomes part of her husband's family, which means she is no longer responsible for her parents' care as they age. Thus, their parents worry about who will take care of them if their daughter were to get married. In general, those that follow the traditional Chinese society believe that sons can take responsibility for their family, instead of girls.

In other words, traditionally, the blood of the family has been inherited by the male side. After the woman married, she joined her husband's family and took care of her in-laws rather than her own parents. There has long been the idea "to raise children to fight against aging" to ensure that one is cared for in their old age. Therefore, raising a daughter becomes a waste of one's efforts. Some Chinese Sociologists explain that from the perspective of society, it is not rational to be patriarchal, but for individuals, this is still a wise choice.

As the Chinese population continued to grow, the government became concerned. Therefore, the CCP advanced the 'one child policy' in order to control the large population in 1979. New developments in ultrasound technology enabled Chinese parents to know their child's sex before birth, leading some to seek out sex-selective abortion to make sure they have boys. With only one child allowed per family, many viewed it as more important than ever to make sure that they had a son to care for them in their old age.

=== Traditional Chinese folk religion ===
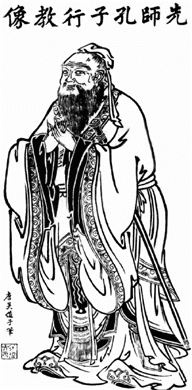
Confucius, founder of Confucianism

In rural China, traditional Chinese folk religion plays a role in son preference. Such folk religion may overlap with an individual's belief in Buddhism, Taoism, Confucianism, or other traditional Chinese religions. The majority of ancient Chinese were adherents of Confucianism, which values patriarchy. In general, the preference of a son is strongly reinforced in countries which follow Confucianism.

Confucianism brings a heavy burden on Chinese women. In Chinese traditional Confucian families, the husband and other family members have more status than wives. A Chinese wife's responsibility is to look after and serve the household, including doing all the housework. Ancestor worship is underlined by Chinese folk religion as well. Chinese ancestor worship emphasizes filial piety. One of the filial method is to continue the family line in China. Passing on the genealogy is one of the main methods to continue the family. However, in old Chinese beliefs, a family’s genealogy will be interrupted if they do not have sons. Moreover, the inability to bear a son can become a potential factor for divorce for some couples.

== Consequences ==
The sex ratio at birth (SRB) is defined as the ratio of the new born male infants to every 100 girls. It is demonstrated that China has consistently reported high SRBs in recent decades because of the effect of preferences for sons. This has raised concerns about a potential shortage of women in China in the next 20 years.

The overrepresentation of males among the population has been linked with an increase in violent crime. Some researchers posit that this is in part because some men will necessarily fail to meet traditional expectations, such as marrying and having children, if there are not as many women as men in the population. Supporters of this explanation have pointed to data showing that across cultures, the majority of crime is committed by low-status and unmarried males. They further theorize that men may turn to anti-social organizations, threatening social stability and security, since they do not fit into the current social order.

Excess male population has also been correlated with an increase in the popularity of pornography and commercial sex. The sex industry has been experiencing high rates of expansion in current decades. However, the connection between an increasing demand for sex workers and the female deficit cannot be proved. According to some research, the main reason for the increasing number of sex workers in China may be related to domestic socioeconomic inequality.

Some positive changes may occur because of the high sex ratio of males in China. A woman's status may develop gradually due to the sex preference and the rise in fertility needs. The mortality rate of girls will likely decrease as gender discrimination decreases. Some articles argue that sex imbalance is a way to control China's large population. Ironically, a shortage of women may lead to increased female status, causing the son preference to decrease.

The issue of women’s rights and patriarchal issues has also become a major concern of the representatives of the Chinese National Committees in 2017. In recent years, the Chinese government has attached great importance to the rights and interests of women, especially with the series of targeted measures taken in recent years to significantly improve the status of women. Within China, a strong preference for sons and the practice of sex-selective abortion have resulted in a staggering imbalance, with an excess of 32 million males under the age of 20. This son preference has also triggered postnatal discrimination against girls, manifesting in a range of harmful practices that span from infanticide to the neglect of essential healthcare and nutrition, frequently culminating in untimely mortality.

== Chinese one-child policy ==
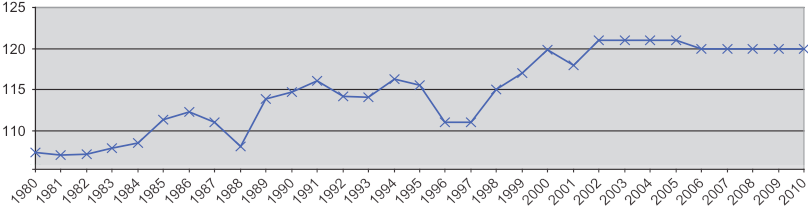
Birth sex ratios have dramatically changed in China since the implementation of the One-Child Policy.

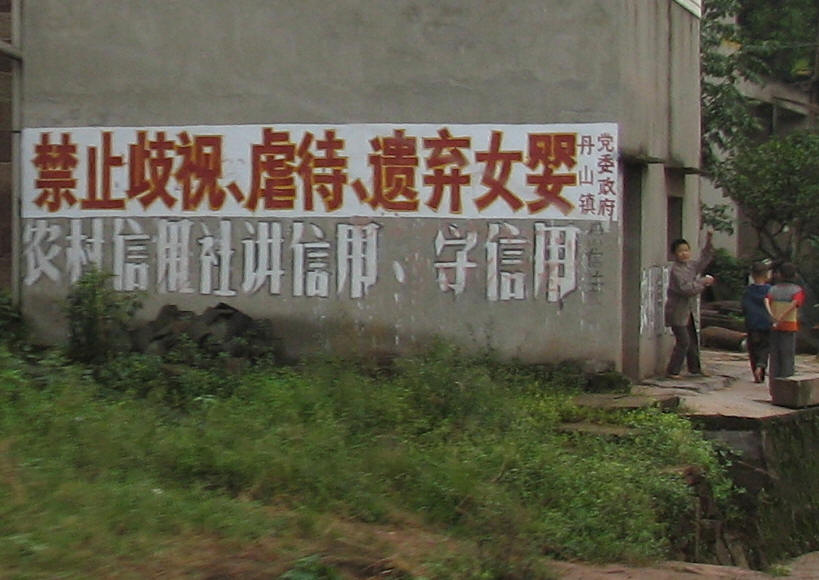
Roadside sign in Danshan, Yanjiang District, Ziyang, Sichuan, which reads "It is forbidden to discriminate against, abuse or abandon baby girls"

The Chinese one-child policy (instituted from 1979 to 2016) contributed to sex imbalance in China as well. The policy penalized families who had more than one child. The original intention of this policy was to control the growth rate of China's large population. Although this policy was introduced as long term and aimed to reduce the number of family members, this measure was not uniformly implemented.

In the early 1980s, the sex ratio of births was 108 (the ratio of male to female was 108:100), slightly higher than the natural level. By 2000, this number had risen to 120, with some provinces such as Anhui, Jiangxi, and Shaanxi reaching 130. Compared to the natural level, this meant 35 million fewer girls were born than would be biologically expected. Although countries like India face similar imbalances, China's gap is the largest, mostly due to the one child policy.

The Chinese government tried to counteract these developments by compensating families who only had a girl and, in some rural areas, allowing them to have a second child if the first was a girl. This however led to further reinforcement of the idea that boys were more valuable.

== Reactions ==
Son preference in China has also attracted social or international attention, leading the United Nations to propose improvements in gender equality in China. The UN Committee on the Elimination of Discrimination against Women produced a report to assess the issue of male overpopulation in China and propose solutions.

The Committee recommended that China conduct compulsory gender equality education for family planning officials and recommended that China address the root causes of patriarchal attitudes in rural areas. To solve the negative consequences of the one-child policy, the specific recommendations of this committee is to expand public benefit in rural areas, especially for rural women, by expanding the insurance system and pensions in China.

== See also ==
- Little emperor syndrome
- Sex-selective abortion in Taiwan
