= Hysterotomy abortion =

Surgical procedure

Background
- Abortion type: Surgical
- First use: <1913
- Gestation: 2nd trimester and later

Usage
- U.S. figures include both hysterotomy and hysterectomy.
- United States: <0.01% (2016)

Hysterotomy abortion is a surgical procedure that removes an intact fetus from the uterus in a process similar to a cesarean section. The procedure is generally indicated after another method of termination has failed, or when such a procedure would be medically inadvisable, such as in the case of placenta accreta.

In 2016, this method made up less than 0.01% of all abortions in the United States, with the CDC reporting only 51 having occurred due to the invasive and complex nature of the procedure, and the availability of much simpler and safer methods. In 2022, scholars reported that in the aftermath of the overturning of Roe v. Wade by Dobbs v. Jackson Women's Health Organization, Texas and other states where so called trigger laws immediately outlawed or heavily restricted reproductive healthcare, providers began performing hysterotomy abortions again. These providers have done so under the justification that such a procedure may not technically be considered an abortion under existing law.

== Indications ==
As with other abortion procedures, the purpose of a hysterotomy abortion is to end a pregnancy by removing the fetus and placenta. This method is the most dangerous of any conventional abortion procedure, and has the highest complication rate. The procedure is specifically indicated in the management of certain medical conditions including Cesarean Scar Pregnancy, bicornuate uterus, uterine fibroids, and in the case of failure of another method or methods.

== Procedure ==
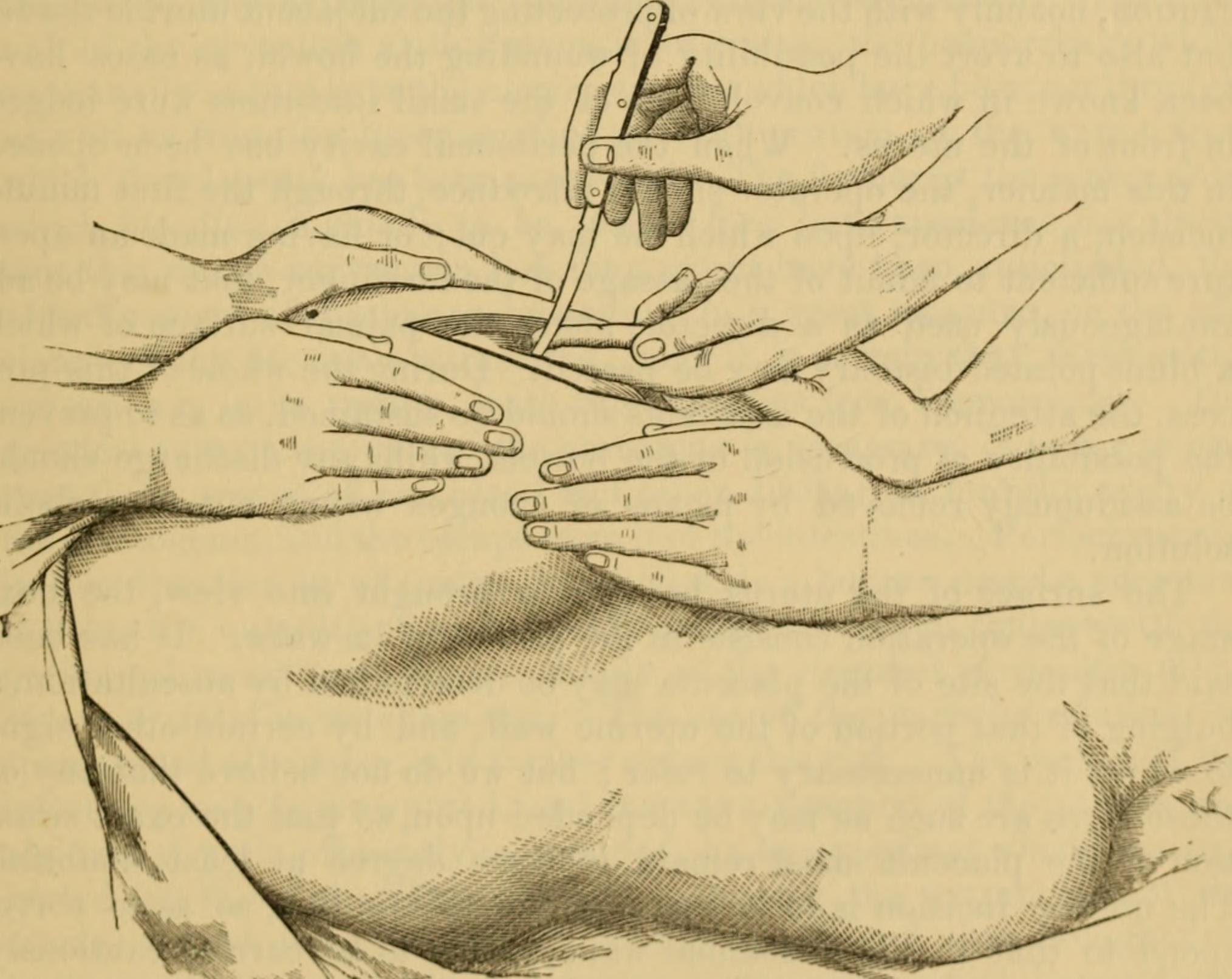
Illustration of a hysterotomy

Hysterotomy is major abdominal surgery; it is generally only performed in hospitals and other advanced practice settings. The procedure is nearly identical to a cesarean section, with two main exceptions: the conduction of foeticide guaranteeing compliance with various laws on the subject, and preventing an unintended live birth; and the size of the incision, which is generally smaller than that of a cesarean section, as the fetus is generally not full term. The size of the incision is not always smaller, however, as late term hysterotomy abortions often remove a term fetus following foeticide.

== History ==
Scholarly sources place the use of this method since at least 1913. Health officials in the United States warned practitioners against performing hysterotomy abortion in an outpatient setting after it led to the deaths of two women in New York during 1971. The rate of mortality of abortion by hysterotomy and hysterectomy reported in the United States between 1972 and 1981 was 60 per 100,000, or 0.06%.
