= Doulos =

Doulos (Ancient Greek: δοῦλος, Greek: δούλος, Linear B: do-e-ro) is a Greek masculine noun meaning "slave". Doulos may refer to:

- A slave (δοῦλος) in ancient Greece; see also Slavery in Ancient Rome as well as Slavery in the New Testament and Slavery in antiquity. Some translations of the New Testament also render this word as "servant" or "bondsman" and some New Testament authors used it metaphorically to refer to Christians as slaves/servants of Jesus Christ.
- MV Doulos, a passenger ship
- Doulos SIL, a Unicode font produced by the SIL International
- Le Doulos, a 1962 film

== See also ==
- Doula (disambiguation), the feminine form
