= Mei Fong =

Malaysian-American journalist

- 方凤美
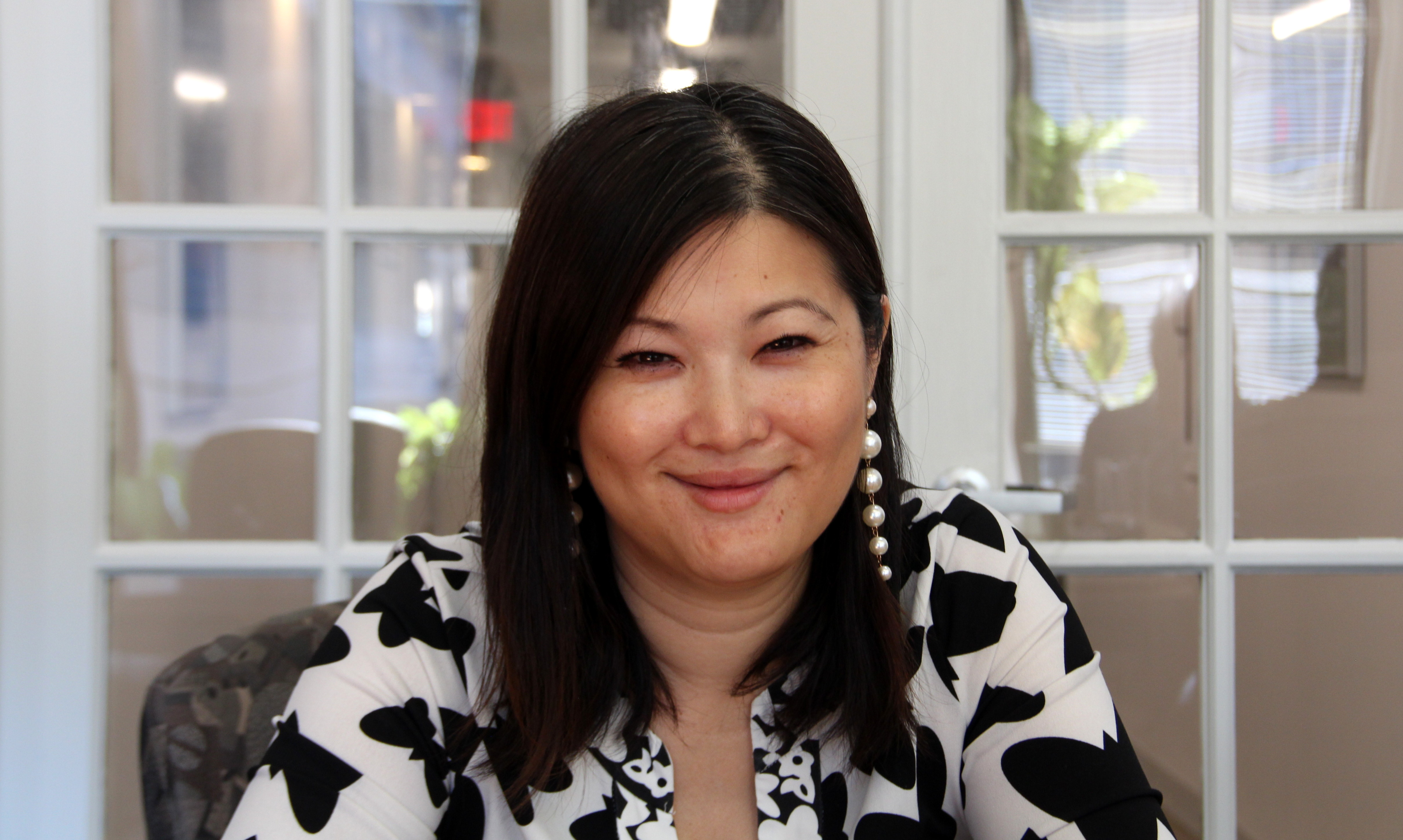
- Born: August 8, 1972 (age 54); Kuala Lumpur, Malaysia
- Education: National University of Singapore, Columbia University
- Occupation: Journalist
- Awards: Pulitzer Prize for International Reporting

Chinese name
- Traditional Chinese: 方鳳美
- Simplified Chinese: 方凤美
- Hanyu Pinyin: Fāng Fèngměi
- Yale Romanization: Fõng Fuhng-méih
- Jyutping: Fong1 Fung6-mei5

Mei Fong (born August 8, 1972), also known as Fong Foongmei (方凤美), is a Malaysian-born American journalist who was staff reporter for the China bureau for The Wall Street Journal. In April 2007, she was awarded the Pulitzer Prize for International Reporting as part of the bureau's "sharply edged reports on the adverse impact of China's booming capitalism on conditions ranging from inequality to pollution." She is "believed to be the first Malaysian ... to achieve this distinction."

Her story on China's migrant construction workers that won the Pulitzer Prize also garnered a 2006 Human Rights Press Award from Amnesty International and the Hong Kong Foreign Correspondents' Club.

Her book about China's one-child policy, One Child: The Past And Future Of China’s Most Radical Experiment, was published as an e-book on November 3, 2015 and was released as a hard cover book (Houghton Mifflin Harcourt, ISBN 9780544275393) on February 1, 2016. In 2017, she was named to Foreign Policy's "The U.S.-China 50" list.

In 2019, Fong became director of communications and strategy for the Center for Public Integrity. She was the executive producer of The Heist, a five episode podcast series covering the economic policies of the Trump administration and a focus on Treasury Secretary Steven Mnuchin.

== Life ==
Fong grew up in Kuala Lumpur, Malaysia, and attended the National University of Singapore for undergraduate studies. After working for The New Paper (Singapore), she went on to attend Columbia University's School of International and Public Affairs and received a Masters of International Affairs degree in 2001.

While working at Forbes Digital in 2000, Fong created the Top-Earning Dead Celebrities list, which is still published every year by the business magazine.

Fong joined The Wall Street Journal full-time in 2001, and in the wake of the 9/11 attacks on the World Trade Center, served in the unusual capacity of City Hall reporter covering the aftermath and recovery of New York City.

== Asia correspondent ==
Fong worked in Hong Kong as a correspondent for the Journal from 2003-2006, and in Beijing from 2006-2009, where she covered economic development, Chinese consumers, and the 2008 Summer Olympics.

During the 2007 proposed sale of The Wall Street Journal to Rupert Murdoch's News Corp, Fong was a vocal opponent of the move. According to the Associated Press story on the purchase, she, along with six Journal colleagues, "wrote a letter to the board of Dow Jones & Co. saying they fear that under Murdoch's leadership writers would be pressured to soften their reporting on China."

In 2009, Fong took a sabbatical leave from The Wall Street Journal and officially left the paper in 2013.

== United States-based work ==
In 2009, Fong joined the University of Southern California Annenberg School for Communication and Journalism as an adjunct professor of journalism, overseeing the international internship program for journalism students in Hong Kong.

In 2013, Fong received a book contract with Houghton Mifflin Harcourt to write about China's one-child policy and its global implications.

In 2014, Fong joined the New America Foundation in Washington, D.C., as the Eric and Wendy Schmidt Fellow.

In 2016, Fong released the book One Child for free in Simplified Chinese, citing her inability to find a willing Chinese or Hong Kong publisher.

Fong's work and interviews were the basis for a featured segment covering China's one child policy on HBO's Last Week Tonight with John Oliver, which aired on October 6, 2019.

Fong has been a contributor to The New York Times, LA Times, Salon, The Atlantic, and National Public Radio.
