= Frederick J. Taussig =

American gynecologist

- c. 1918
- Born: October 26, 1872; Brooklyn, New York, US
- Died: August 21, 1943 (aged 70); Bar Harbor, Maine, US
- Education: Harvard University; Washington University in St. Louis
- Known for: Classic treatise on spontaneous and induced abortion
- Scientific career
- Fields: Gynaecology, obstetrics, public health
- Workplaces: Washington University School of Medicine; Barnard Free Skin and Cancer Hospital

Frederick Joseph Taussig (1872–1943) was an American gynecologist and professor of clinical obstetrics at Washington University School of Medicine. In the 1930s he was an influential advocate of legalization of abortion.

== Life and work ==
At Harvard, c. 1893

Frederick J. Taussig was born in Brooklyn on October 26, 1872. He earned an A.B. at Harvard in 1893 and an M.D. at the Washington University School of Medicine (then called the St. Louis Medical College). He interned at the St. Louis City Hospital for Women and then at the Imperial and Royal Elizabeth Hospital in Vienna.

In the early years of the 20th century, concerned about the large number of indigent cancer patients, he helped treat them and lobbied George D. Barnard to fund what became the Barnard Free Skin and Cancer Hospital. In 1909 he helped found a national association for social hygiene, and in 1910 he wrote the first medical monograph devoted entirely to abortion. In addition to the Barnard Free Skin and Cancer Hospital, Taussig saw patients at the Washington University Hospital, the St. Louis City Hospital, the St. Louis Maternity Hospital, the New Jewish Hospital, and the Barnes Hospital. Many of his research papers—concerning such subjects as abortion and cancer of the vulva, cervix and vagina—were based on observations at those hospitals. In 1933 Taussig joined with colleagues Robert Crossen, Frances Stewart, and Lesley Patton to organize the first birth control clinic in St. Louis. In 1943 the clinic was renamed the Planned Parenthood Clinic of Missouri. Taussig was also on the board of directors at the National Committee on Maternal Health and the National Committee for Maternal Welfare.

The medical researcher Edmund Cowdry said that Taussig's 1936 book Abortion, Spontaneous and Induced: Medical and Social Aspects is "a classic recognized by medical men and sociologists alike," and Mary Calderone of Planned Parenthood cited the book as a pioneering work. Robert Latou Dickinson wrote about the book that it "renders service that is fundamental."

Taussig died from pneumonia in Bar Harbor, Maine on August 21, 1943.

== Views on women and abortion ==
Early in his career, Frederick Taussig was opposed to abortion. His 1910 book called widespread abortion "wholesale slaughter of the innocents." In the book he counseled his fellow physicians to be wary of women who exaggerate their difficulties in pregnancy in order to convince their doctors to give them a therapeutic abortion.

However, by 1936, when Taussig wrote his most famous treatise on abortion, his views had changed. Authors who support legal access to safe abortions have credited Taussig with being an important voice for legalization in the 1930s, in part because, as an eminent physician who was not associated with the radical movements of the time, he had credibility among the more conservative sections of the public. Opponents of legalized abortion have concurred with this assessment; Marvin Olasky, the editor-in-chief of the Christian evangelical magazine World, has called Taussig's Abortion, Spontaneous and Induced "the most effective pro-abortion book of the 1930s."

By the 1930s Taussig had also changed his attitude toward women. Rather than advising doctors to expect deviousness from women as he had done in the 1910 volume, he drew contrasts between the skill of midwives and the clumsiness of doctors whose sharp instruments often caused perforations of the uterus. He wrote that the increase in injury and death because of perforations over the previous fifty years was largely the result of "the proportionate increase in abortions handled by doctors as against those handled by midwives." Some passages in the 1936 book explicitly support greater rights for women:

With the spread of the Woman's Suffrage Movement throughout the world and the newer economic independence of women, the revolt of womankind against the age-long domination of man has finally materialized. There can be no question that more consideration must be given to the right of women to control their own bodies.... Thus far all laws and social regulations on abortion have been man-made, and women, who are the chief sufferers, have had no chance to express their views in any referendum.

Both Taussig's wife Florence Gottschalk and his daughter Mary Taussig Hall were active in women's rights and other progressive movements, in the latter case starting in 1916 at age 5, when she walked with her mother at the head of a demonstration by 7,000 women demanding the right to vote.

== Selected works ==
- The Prevention and Treatment of Abortion. C. V. Mosby. 1910. OCLC 01970381.
- Diseases of the Vulva. D. Appleton and Co. 1923. OCLC 14787023.
- Abortion, Spontaneous and Induced: Medical and Social Aspects. C. V. Mosby. 1936. OCLC 00400798.
