= Resuscitative hysterotomy =

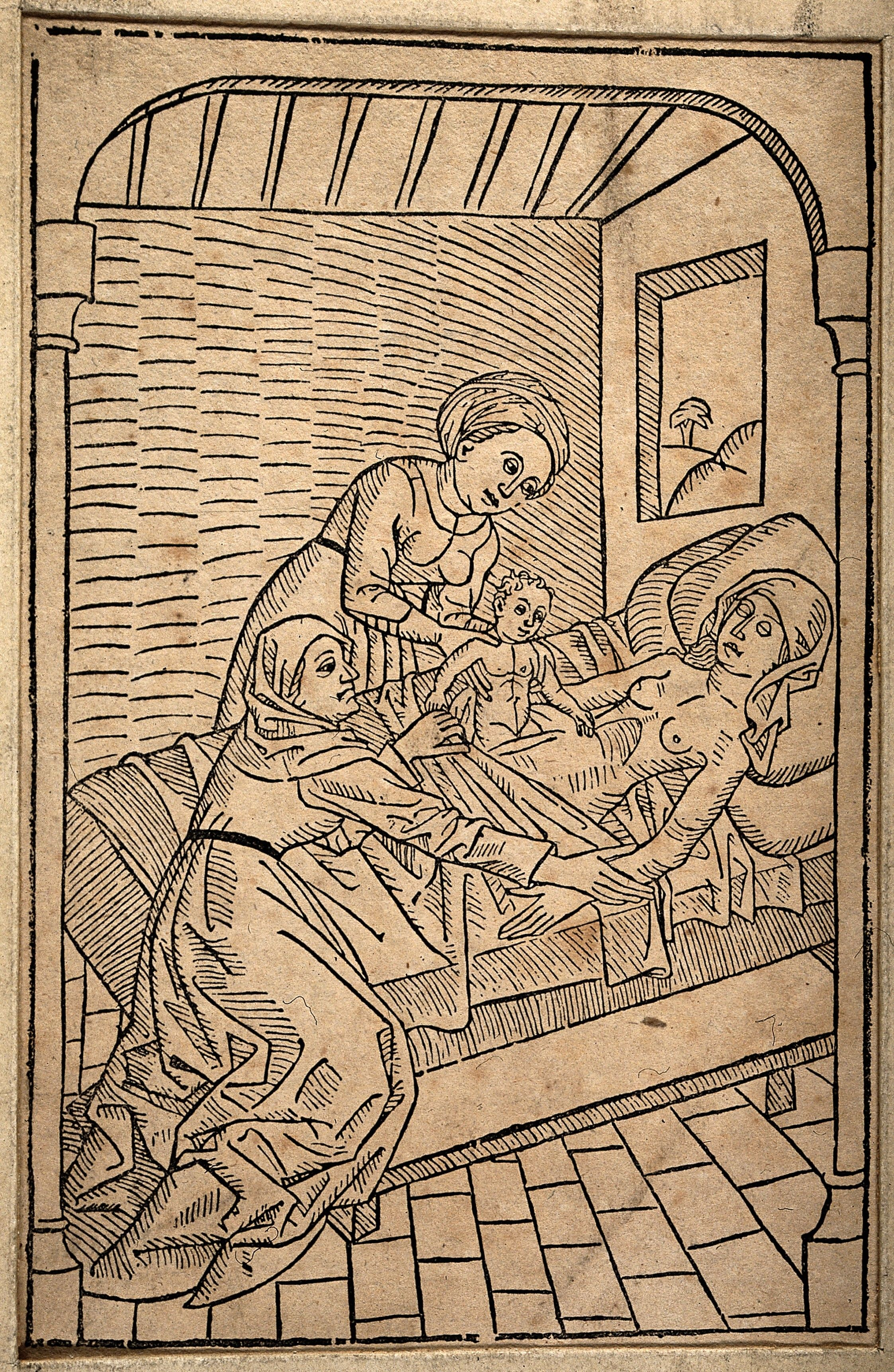
- A baby being removed from its dying mother's womb. Reproduction of woodcut, 1483.
- Other names: Perimortem Caesarean section
- eMedicine: 83059

A resuscitative hysterotomy, also referred to as a perimortem Caesarean section (PMCS) or perimortem Caesarean delivery (PMCD), is a hysterotomy performed to resuscitate a woman in the middle to late pregnancy who has entered cardiac arrest. Combined with a laparotomy, the procedure results in a Caesarean section that removes the fetus, thereby abolishing the aortocaval compression caused by the pregnant uterus. This improves the mother's chances of return of spontaneous circulation, and may potentially also deliver a viable neonate. The procedure may be performed by obstetricians, emergency physicians or surgeons depending on the situation.

== Medical uses ==
Resuscitative hysterotomy should be performed immediately when three conditions are met:

1. Cardiac arrest occurs during pregnancy
2. The patient is not revived by basic and advanced life support (e.g. CPR and defibrillation) techniques
3. The uterus is large enough to cause aortocaval compression

The third condition is met when palpation finds the top of the uterus level with the navel. This usually occurs around 20 weeks gestational age, but may be earlier if there is more than one fetus (e.g. twins or triplets).

Depending on the situation, it may or may not be possible to save the patient and it may or may not be possible to save her fetus. But for both, a resuscitative hysterotomy is the best chance of survival.

Prior to viability (approximately 24 weeks' gestation), it is not possible to save the fetus. It cannot survive outside the womb, but also cannot survive inside the womb after maternal death. In this case, there is no way to save the fetus but performing a hysterotomy can save the woman.

Conversely, if the fetus has reached the point of viability, a prompt birth via Caesarean section offers the best chance of survival. Even if there is no reasonable prospect of maternal resuscitation (for example, after a nonsurvivable injury or prolonged cardiac arrest), the procedure can still serve this purpose.

== Contra-indications ==
The procedure should not be performed if the uterus is not judged to be large enough to cause maternal haemodynamic changes through aortocaval compression, as there is no potential benefit to the mother and the fetus or fetuses will not be viable in such an early stage of pregnancy.

== Risks and complications ==
Potential structures that may be damaged during the procedure are as for Caesarean section, including the fetus itself and the maternal bowel, bladder, uterus and uterine blood vessels.

== Technique ==
Once the decision to operate has been made, the procedure should be performed immediately at the site where cardiac arrest has taken place and standard basic and advanced life support resuscitation methods should continue throughout. These should include manual displacement of the uterus towards the patient's left side, to reduce aortocaval compression. If the arrest occurs in a healthcare facility that has staff on site who are capable of performing a resuscitative hysterotomy (such as at a hospital), the patient should not be moved to an operating theatre as this will delay the procedure. Out-of-hospital cardiac arrests may need to be transported to a healthcare facility first if qualified staff are not immediately available.

Other than a scalpel, no specialised surgical equipment is needed for a resuscitative hysterotomy. The American Heart Association recommends that healthcare facilities that may be required to treat a case of maternal cardiac arrest should keep in stock an emergency equipment tray for the purpose, including a scalpel with a No. 10 blade, a Balfour retractor, surgical sponges, Kelly and Russian forceps, a needle driver, sutures and suture scissors - but the procedure should commence regardless of whether the tray is available.

Basic aseptic measures, such as pouring antiseptic solution over the woman's abdomen prior to incision, may be considered as long as this adds no delay. An assistant should manually displace the gravid uterus to the woman's left throughout the procedure until the fetus has been delivered, to assist the simultaneous efforts of those resuscitating the woman. Either a classical midine incision or a Pfannenstiel incision may be used depending on operator preference; the former may theoretically give better exposure, but practising obstetricians or surgeons may be more comfortable with a Pfannenstiel approach as this is more commonly used for Caesarean sections. Once the uterus is opened, the fetus is delivered and should be resuscitated by a separate team. It may be possible to then use the abdominal incision to deliver direct cardiac massage through the (intact) diaphragm. in the 2025 revised guidelines of the Eastern Association for the Surgery of Trauma, it is recommended that when performing a Resuscitative thoracotomy on a traumatic cardiac arrest patient who appears to be pregnant, a Resuscitative Hysterectomy should also be performed concurrently.

After the placenta is delivered, the uterus is massaged to stimulate contraction and is closed with a running locking absorbable suture and the abdomen is then closed; alternatively, the wound may be temporarily packed with sterile gauze, with definitive closure delayed until specialist obstetric help arrives or until the patient is fit for transport to a formal operating theatre. Uterotonic agents like oxytocin may be considered, balancing potential reduction of haemorrhage with the tendency of oxytocin to cause hypotension. Antibiotics should be administered to reduce infection risk if maternal survival is thought feasible at this stage of the resuscitation. If there is return of spontaneous circulation, additional uterotonic agents will likely be needed due to bleeding from uterine atony.

== History ==
The American Heart Association first added resuscitative hysterotomy to its recommended guidelines for cardiopulmonary resuscitation and emergency cardiac care in 1992, based on limited case report evidence. Many case reports have since been published reporting that, in maternal cardiac arrest, evacuation of the uterus is often associated with abrupt return of spontaneous circulation or other improvement in the mother's condition.
