= Definitions of abortion =

Definitions of abortion vary from one source to another. Abortion has many definitions that can differ from each other in significant ways. Given the contentious nature of abortion, lawmakers and other stakeholders often face controversy in defining abortion. Language referring to abortion often reflects societal and political opinions (not only scientific knowledge). Influential non-state actors like the United Nations and the Roman Catholic Church have also engendered controversy over efforts to define abortion.

Late termination of pregnancy is the term usually used for later uterine evacuation.

== Concerns in the medical community ==
Ambiguous definitions can create concerns in the medical community. Physicians in several countries, including Ireland and Canada, have expressed concern over ambiguous definitions of abortion. Even in situations where there is a clear definition of abortion, it does not always match definitions of related terms in effect in the same jurisdiction.

== Examples of definitions ==
The following is a partial list of definitions as stated by obstetrics and gynecology (OB/GYN) textbooks, dictionaries, and encyclopedias:

Major OB/GYN textbooks

- The National Center for Health Statistics defines an "abortus" as "[a] fetus or embryo removed or expelled from the uterus during the first half of gestation—20 weeks or less, or in the absence of accurate dating criteria, born weighing < 500 g." They also define "birth" as "[t]he complete expulsion or extraction from the mother of a fetus after 20 weeks' gestation. [...] in the absence of accurate dating criteria, fetuses weighing <500 g are usually not considered births, but rather are termed abortuses for purposes of vital statistics."
- "[T]he standard medical definition of abortion [is] termination of a pregnancy when the fetus is not viable".

Other OB/GYN textbooks

- "Termination of pregnancy before 20 weeks' gestation calculated from date of onset of last menses. An alternative definition is delivery of a fetus with a weight of less than 500 g. If abortion occurs before 12 weeks' gestation, it is called early; from 12 to 20 weeks it is called late."
- "Abortion is the spontaneous or induced termination of pregnancy before fetal viability. Because popular use of the word abortion implies a deliberate pregnancy termination, some prefer the word miscarriage to refer to spontaneous fetal loss before viability [...] The National Center for Health Statistics, the Centers for Disease Control and Prevention (CDC), and the World Health Organization (WHO) define abortion as pregnancy termination prior to 20 weeks' gestation or a fetus born weighing less than 500 g. Despite this, definitions vary widely according to state laws."

Major medical dictionaries

- "The spontaneous or induced termination of pregnancy before the fetus reaches a viable age."
- "Expulsion from the uterus an embryo or fetus prior to the stage of viability (20 weeks' gestation or fetal weight <500g). A distinction made between [abortion] and premature birth: premature infants are those born after the stage of viability but prior to 37 weeks."
- "[P]remature expulsion from the uterus of the products of conception, either the embryo or a nonviable fetus."

Other medical dictionaries

- "[T]he termination of a pregnancy after, accompanied by, resulting in, or closely followed by the death of the embryo or fetus".
- "Induced termination of pregnancy, involving destruction of the embryo or fetus." "abortion."
- "Interruption of pregnancy before the fetus has attained a stage of viability, usually before the 24th gestational week." "abortion."
- "[A] spontaneous or deliberate ending of pregnancy before the fetus can be expected to survive." "abortion."
- "[A] situation where a fetus leaves the uterus before it is fully developed, especially during the first 28 weeks of pregnancy, or a procedure which causes this to happen...[T]o have an abortion to have an operation to make a fetus leave the uterus during the first period of pregnancy."
- "1. Induced termination of a pregnancy with destruction of the fetus or embryo; therapeutic abortion. 2. Spontaneous abortion."
- "Although the term abortion is generic and implies a premature termination of pregnancy for any reason, the lay public better understands the word 'miscarriage' for involuntary fetal loss or fetal wastage."
- "The termination of pregnancy or premature expulsion of the products of conception by any means, usually before fetal viability."

Bibliographies

- "An abortion refers to the termination of a pregnancy. It can be induced (see Definitions, Terminology, and Reference Resources) through a pharmacological or a surgical procedure, or it may be spontaneous (also called miscarriage)." "Definitions of abortion vary across and within countries as well as among different institutions. Language used to refer to abortion often also reflects societal and political opinions and not only scientific knowledge (Grimes and Gretchen 2010). Popular use of the word abortion implies a deliberate pregnancy termination, whereas a miscarriage is used to refer to spontaneous fetal loss when the fetus is not viable (i.e., not yet unable to survive independently outside the womb)."

Major English dictionaries (general-purpose)

- "1. a. The expulsion or removal from the womb of a developing embryo or fetus, spec. (Med.) in the period before it is capable of independent survival, occurring as a result either of natural causes (more fully spontaneous abortion) or of a deliberate act (more fully induced abortion); the early or premature termination of pregnancy with loss of the fetus; an instance of this."
- "[A]n operation or other procedure to terminate pregnancy before the fetus is viable" or "[T]he premature termination of pregnancy by spontaneous or induced expulsion of a nonviable fetus from the uterus".
- "[T]he removal of an embryo or fetus from the uterus in order to end a pregnancy" or "[A]ny of various surgical methods for terminating a pregnancy, especially during the first six months."
- "[T]he termination of a pregnancy after, accompanied by, resulting in, or closely followed by the death of the embryo or fetus: as (a) spontaneous expulsion of a human fetus during the first 12 weeks of gestation (b) induced expulsion of a human fetus (c) expulsion of a fetus by a domestic animal often due to infection at any time before completion of pregnancy."
- "1. medicine the removal of an embryo or fetus from the uterus before it is sufficiently developed to survive independently, deliberately induced by the use of drugs or by surgical procedures. Also called termination or induced abortion. 2. medicine the spontaneous expulsion of an embryo or fetus from the uterus before it is sufficiently developed to survive independently. Also called miscarriage, spontaneous abortion."
- "a medical operation to end a pregnancy so that the baby is not born alive".

Other dictionaries

- "The deliberate termination of a pregnancy, usually before the embryo or fetus is capable of independent life."
- "A term that, in philosophy, theology, and social debates, often means the deliberate termination of pregnancy before the fetus is able to survive outside the uterus. However, participants in these debates sometimes use the term abortion simply to mean the termination of pregnancy before birth, regardless of whether the fetus is viable or not."
- "1. An artificially induced termination of a pregnancy for the purpose of destroying an embryo or fetus. 2. The spontaneous expulsion of an embryo or fetus before viability;"

Encyclopedias

- "[T]he expulsion of a fetus from the uterus before it has reached the stage of viability (in human beings, usually about the 20th week of gestation)."
- "Expulsion of the products of conception before the embryo or fetus is viable. Any interruption of human pregnancy prior to the 28th week is known as abortion."
- "The expulsion or removal of a fetus from the womb before it is capable of independent survival."
- "[Abortion] is commonly misunderstood outside medical circles. In general terms, the word 'abortion' simply means the failure of something to reach fulfilment or maturity. Medically, abortion means loss of the fetus, for any reason, before it is able to survive outside the womb. The term covers accidental or spontaneous ending, or miscarriage, of pregnancy as well as deliberate termination. The terms 'spontaneous abortion' and 'miscarriage' are synonymous and are defined as loss of the fetus before the twenty-eighth week of pregnancy. This definition implies a legal perception of the age at which a fetus can survive out of the womb. With great advances in recent years in the ability to keep very premature babies alive, this definition is in need of revision."
- "Abortion is the intentional removal of a fetus or an embryo from a mother's womb for purposes other than that of either producing a live birth or disposing of a dead embryo."

Philosophical essays

- "The act that a woman performs in voluntarily terminating, or allowing another person to terminate, her pregnancy."

== See also ==
- Contraception Begins at Erection Act
- Feticide
