= Abortion =

Termination of a pregnancy

Induced abortion
- Other names: Induced miscarriage, termination of pregnancy
- Specialty: Obstetrics and gynecology
- ICD-10-PCS: 10A0
- ICD-9-CM: 779.6
- MeSH: D000028
- MedlinePlus: 007382
- eMedicine: 252560

Spontaneous abortion
- Other names: Miscarriage
- Specialty: Obstetrics

Abortion is the termination of a pregnancy by removal or expulsion of an embryo or fetus. (Note: For a list of definitions as stated by obstetrics and gynecology (OB/GYN) textbooks, dictionaries, and other sources, see Definitions of abortion. Definitions of abortion vary from source to source, and language used to define abortion often reflects societal and political opinions, not only scientific knowledge.) The unmodified word abortion generally refers to induced abortion, or deliberate actions to end a pregnancy. (Note: Induced abortion is less frequently called "induced miscarriage".) Abortion occurring without intervention is known as spontaneous abortion or "miscarriage", and occurs in roughly 30–40% of all pregnancies. Common reasons for inducing an abortion are birth-timing and limiting family size. Other reasons include maternal health, an inability to afford a child, domestic violence, lack of support, feelings of being too young, wishing to complete an education or advance a career, and not being able, or willing, to raise a child conceived as a result of rape or incest.

When done legally in industrialized societies, induced abortion is one of the safest procedures in medicine. Modern methods use medication or surgery for abortions. The drug mifepristone (aka RU-486) in combination with prostaglandin appears to be as safe and effective as surgery during the first and second trimesters of pregnancy. Self-managed medication abortion is highly effective and safe throughout the first trimester. The most common surgical technique involves dilating the cervix and using a suction device. Birth control, such as contraceptive pills or intrauterine devices, can be used immediately following an abortion. When performed legally and safely on a woman who desires it, an induced abortion does not increase the risk of long-term mental or physical problems. In contrast, unsafe abortions performed by unskilled individuals, with hazardous equipment, or in unsanitary facilities cause between 22,000 and 44,000 deaths and 6.9 million hospital admissions each year — responsible for between 5% and 13% of maternal deaths, especially in low-income countries. The World Health Organization states that "access to legal, safe and comprehensive abortion care, including post-abortion care, is essential for the attainment of the highest possible level of sexual and reproductive health". Public health data show that making safe abortion legal and accessible reduces maternal deaths.

Around 73 million abortions are performed each year in the world, with about 45% done unsafely. Abortion rates changed little between 2003 and 2008, before which they decreased for at least two decades as access to family planning and birth control increased. As of 2018, 37% of the world's women had access to legal abortions without limits as to reason. Countries that permit abortions have different limits on how late in pregnancy abortion is allowed. Abortion rates are similar between countries that restrict abortion and countries that broadly allow it, though this is partly because countries which restrict abortion tend to have higher unintended pregnancy rates.

Since 1973, there has been a global trend towards greater legal access to abortion, but there remains debate with regard to moral, religious, ethical, and legal issues. Those who oppose abortion often argue that an embryo or fetus is a person with a right to life, and thus equate abortion with murder. Those who support abortion's legality often argue that it is a woman's reproductive right. Public health researchers and organizations have also framed access to legal abortion as a public health measure, given its association with reduced maternal mortality. Abortion laws and views of the procedure are different around the world. In some countries abortion is legal and women have the right to make the choice about abortion. In some areas, abortion is legal only in specific cases such as rape, incest, fetal defects, poverty, and risk to a woman's health. Historically, abortions have been attempted using herbal medicines, sharp tools, forceful massage, or other traditional methods.

== History ==
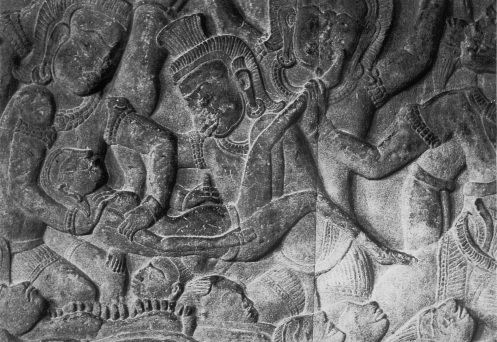
Bas-relief at Angkor Wat, Cambodia, c. 1150, depicting a demon inducing an abortion by pounding the abdomen of a pregnant woman with a pestle

Since ancient times, abortions have been done using a number of methods, including herbal medicines acting as abortifacients, sharp tools through the use of force, or through other traditional medicine methods. Induced abortion has a long history and can be traced back to civilizations as varied as ancient China (abortifacient knowledge is often attributed to the mythological ruler Shennong), ancient India since its Vedic age, ancient Egypt with its Ebers Papyrus (c. 1550 BCE), and the Roman Empire in the time of Juvenal (c. 200 CE). One of the earliest known artistic representations of abortion is in a bas relief at Angkor Wat (c. 1150). Found in a series of friezes that represent judgment after death in Hindu and Buddhist culture, it depicts the technique of abdominal abortion.

Some medical scholars and abortion opponents have suggested that the Hippocratic Oath forbade physicians in Ancient Greece from performing abortions; other scholars disagree with this interpretation, and state that the medical texts of Hippocratic Corpus contain descriptions of abortive techniques right alongside the Oath. In Politics (350 BCE), Aristotle condemned infanticide as a means of population control. He preferred abortion in such cases, with the restriction that it "must be practised on it before it has developed sensation and life; for the line between lawful and unlawful abortion will be marked by the fact of having sensation and being alive". Abortion has been a fairly common practice, and was not always illegal or controversial until the 19th century. In Europe and North America, abortion techniques advanced starting in the 17th century; the conservatism of most in the medical profession with regards to sexual matters prevented the wide expansion of abortion techniques. Other medical practitioners in addition to some physicians advertised their services, and they were not widely regulated until the 19th century when the practice, sometimes called restellism, was banned in both the United States and the United Kingdom. (Note: In the United States, the first laws related to abortion beginning in the 1820s were made to protect women from real or perceived risks, and those more restrictive penalized only the provider. By 1859, abortion was not a crime in 21 out of 33 states, and was prohibited only post-quickening, while penalties for pre-quickening abortions were lower. This changed starting in the 1860s under the influence of anti-immigrant and anti-Catholic sentiment.)

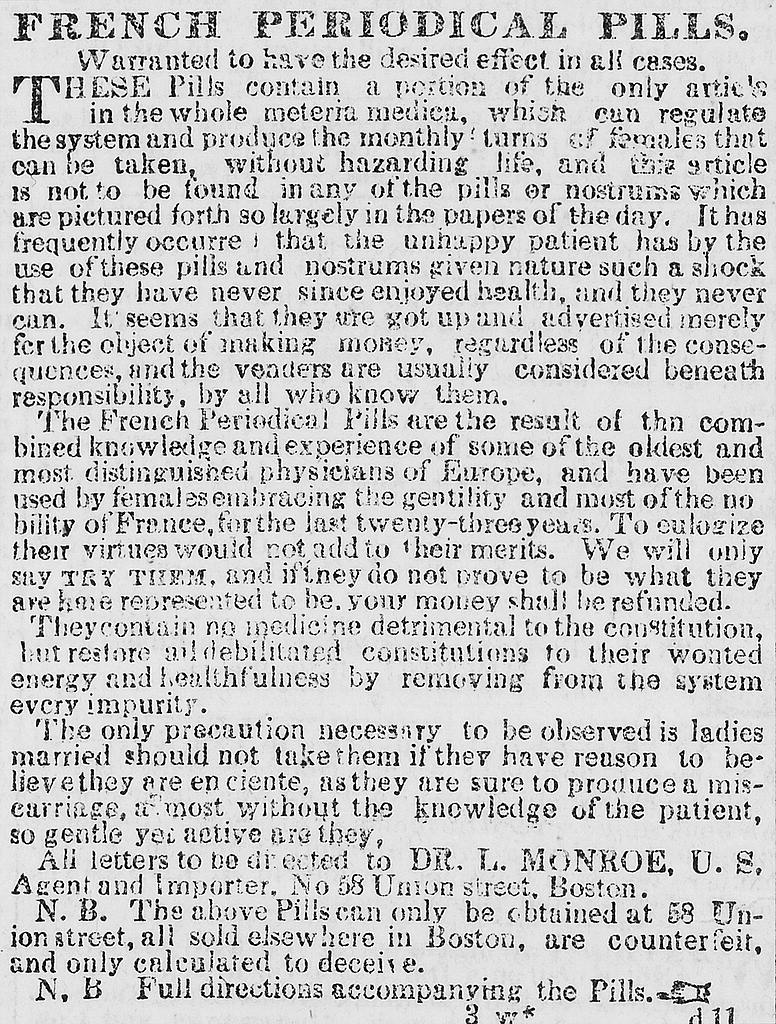
"French Periodical Pills" was an example of a clandestine advertisement published in a January 1845 edition of the Boston Daily Times.

Some 19th-century American physicians, argued for anti-abortion laws on racist and misogynist as well as moral grounds. Church groups were also highly influential in anti-abortion movements, and religious groups more so since the 20th century. Some of the early anti-abortion laws punished only the doctor or abortionist, and while women could be criminally tried for a self-induced abortion, they were rarely prosecuted in general. In November 1885, at Staffordshire Assizes, a woman was sentenced to seven years penal servitude for attempting to procure an abortion.

Some maintain that in the 19th century early abortions under the hygienic conditions in which midwives usually worked were relatively safe. Several scholars argue that, despite improved medical procedures, the period from the 1930s until the 1970s saw more zealous enforcement of anti-abortion laws, alongside an increasing control of abortion providers by organized crime. (Note: For sources, see: James Donner, Women in Trouble: The Truth about Abortion in America, Monarch Books, 1959.; Ann Oakley, The Captured Womb, Basil Blackwell, 1984, p. 91.; Rickie Solinger, The Abortionist: A Woman Against the Law, The Free Press, 1994, pp. xi, 5, 16–17, 157–175.; Leslie J. Reagan, When Abortion Was a Crime: Women, Medicine, and Law in the United States, 1867–1973, University of California Press, 1997.; Max Evans, Madam Millie: Bordellos from Silver City to Ketchikan, University of New Mexico Press, 2002, pp. 209–218, 230, 267–286, 305.) In 1920, Soviet Russia became the first country to legalize abortion after Lenin insisted that no woman be forced to give birth. Abortion was then legalized in some form in Iceland (1935), Sweden (1938), Nazi Germany (1935) and Japan (1948) Beginning in the second half of the 20th century, abortion was legalized in a greater number of countries.

== Types ==
=== Induced ===
An induced abortion is a medical procedure to end a pregnancy. In present-day English, the term abortion, when used without further qualification, generally refers to induced abortion.

A pregnancy can be intentionally aborted in several ways. The abortion method depends upon the gestational age of the embryo or fetus, which gains mass as the pregnancy progresses. Abortion laws, regional availability, and the personal preference of the woman and her doctor may inform the woman's choice of a specific abortion procedure.

Abortions can be characterized as either therapeutic or elective. When an abortion is performed for medical reasons, the procedure is referred to as a therapeutic abortion. Medical reasons for therapeutic abortion include saving the life of the pregnant woman, preventing harm to the woman's physical or mental health, preventing the birth of a child who will have a significantly increased chance of mortality or morbidity, and reducing the number of fetuses to lessen health risks associated with multiple pregnancy. An abortion is referred to as elective or voluntary when it is performed at the request of the woman for non-medical reasons. Confusion sometimes arises over the term elective because "elective surgery" generally refers to all scheduled surgery, whether medically necessary or not.

About one in five pregnancies worldwide ends with an induced abortion. Most abortions result from unintended pregnancies. In the United Kingdom, 1 to 2% of abortions are done because of genetic problems in the fetus.

=== Spontaneous ===
Miscarriage, also known as spontaneous abortion, is the unintentional expulsion of an embryo or fetus before the 24th week of gestation. A pregnancy that ends before 37 weeks of gestation resulting in a live-born infant is a "premature birth" or a "preterm birth". When a fetus dies in utero after viability, or during delivery, it is usually termed "stillborn". Premature births and stillbirths are generally not considered to be miscarriages, although usage of these terms can sometimes overlap.

Studies of pregnant women in the US and China have shown that between 40% and 60% of embryos do not progress to birth. The vast majority of miscarriages occur before the woman is aware that she is pregnant, and many pregnancies spontaneously abort before medical practitioners can detect an embryo. Between 15% and 30% of known pregnancies end in clinically apparent miscarriage, depending upon the age and health of the pregnant woman. 80% of these spontaneous abortions happen in the first trimester.

The most common cause of spontaneous abortion during the first trimester is chromosomal abnormalities of the embryo or fetus, accounting for at least 50% of sampled early pregnancy losses. Other causes include vascular disease (such as lupus), diabetes, other hormonal problems, infection, and abnormalities of the uterus. Advancing maternal age and a woman's history of previous spontaneous abortions are the two leading factors associated with a greater risk of spontaneous abortion. A spontaneous abortion can also be caused by accidental trauma; intentional trauma or stress to cause miscarriage is considered induced abortion or feticide.

== Methods ==
=== Medical ===
Gestational age may determine which abortion methods are practiced.

Medical abortions are those induced by abortifacient pharmaceuticals. Medical abortion became an alternative method of abortion with the availability of prostaglandin analogs in the 1970s and the antiprogestogen mifepristone (also known as RU-486) in the 1980s.

The most common early first trimester medical abortion regimens use mifepristone in combination with misoprostol (or sometimes another prostaglandin analog, gemeprost) up to 10 weeks (70 days) gestational age, methotrexate in combination with a prostaglandin analog up to 7 weeks gestation, or a prostaglandin analog alone. Mifepristone–misoprostol combination regimens work faster and are more effective at later gestational ages than methotrexate–misoprostol combination regimens, and combination regimens are more effective than misoprostol alone, particularly in the second trimester. Medical abortion regimens involving mifepristone followed by misoprostol in the cheek between 24 and 48 hours later are effective when performed before 70 days' gestation.

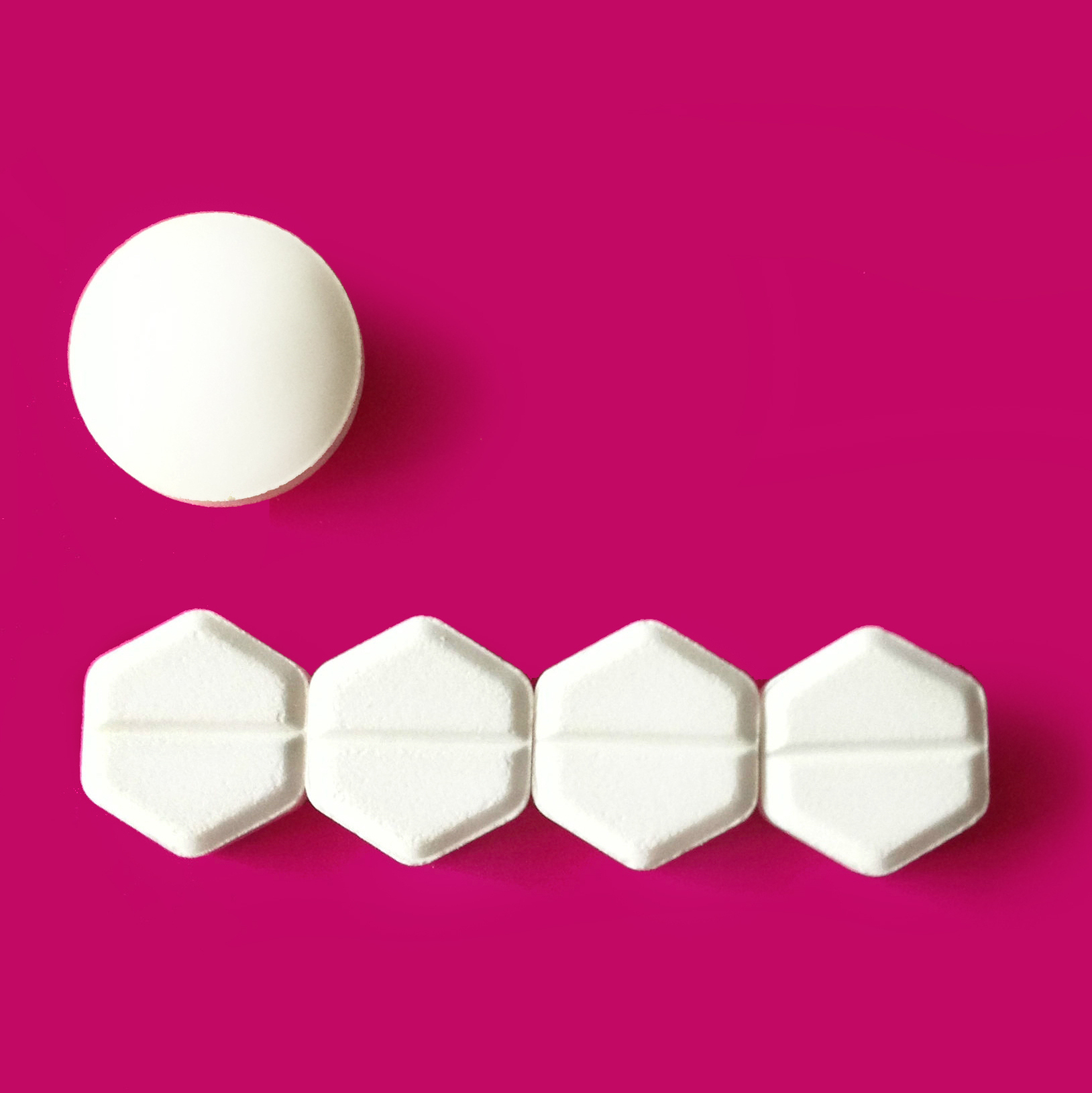
Shown here is the typical regimen for early medical abortions (200 mg mifepristone and 800 μg misoprostol).

In very early abortions, up to 7 weeks gestation, medical abortion using a mifepristone–misoprostol combination regimen is considered to be more effective than surgical abortion (vacuum aspiration), especially when clinical practice does not include detailed inspection of aspirated tissue. Early medical abortion regimens using mifepristone, followed 24–48 hours later by buccal or vaginal misoprostol are 98% effective up to 9 weeks gestational age; from 9 to 10 weeks efficacy decreases modestly to 94%. If medical abortion fails, surgical abortion must be used to complete the procedure.

Early medical abortions account for the majority of abortions before 9 weeks gestation in Britain, France, Switzerland, United States, and the Nordic countries.

Medical abortion regimens using mifepristone in combination with a prostaglandin analog are the most common methods used for second trimester abortions in Canada, most of Europe, China and India, in contrast to the United States where 96% of second trimester abortions are performed surgically by dilation and evacuation.

A 2020 Cochrane Systematic Review concluded that providing women with medications to take home to complete the second stage of the procedure for an early medical abortion results in an effective abortion. Further research is required to determine if self-administered medical abortion is as safe as provider-administered medical abortion, where a health care professional is present to help manage the medical abortion. Safely permitting women to self-administer abortion medication has the potential to improve access to abortion. The review also noted a research gap concerning methods to support women who take medication at home for a self-administered abortion.

=== Surgical ===
A vacuum aspiration abortion at eight weeks gestational age (six weeks after fertilization). 1: Amniotic sac 2: Embryo 3: Uterine lining 4: Speculum 5: Vacurette 6: Attached to a suction pump

Up to 15 weeks' gestation, suction-aspiration or vacuum aspiration are the most common surgical methods of induced abortion. Manual vacuum aspiration (MVA) consists of removing the fetus or embryo, placenta, and membranes by suction using a manual syringe, while electric vacuum aspiration (EVA) uses an electric pump. Both techniques can be used very early in pregnancy. MVA can be used up to 14 weeks but is more often used earlier in the United States. EVA can be used later.

MVA, also known as "mini-suction" and "menstrual extraction", or EVA can be used in very early pregnancy when cervical dilation may not be required. Dilation and curettage (D&C) refers to opening the cervix (dilation) and removing tissue (curettage) via suction or sharp instruments. D&C is a standard gynecological procedure performed for a variety of reasons, including examination of the uterine lining for possible malignancy, investigation of abnormal bleeding, and abortion. The World Health Organization recommends sharp curettage only when suction aspiration is unavailable.

Dilation and evacuation (D&E), used after 12 to 16 weeks, consists of opening the cervix and removing pregnancy tissue and fetal parts with suction and forceps. D&E is performed vaginally and does not require an incision. Intact dilation and extraction (D&X) refers to a variant of D&E sometimes used after 18 to 20 weeks when removal of an intact fetus improves surgical safety or for other reasons.

Abortion may also be performed surgically by hysterotomy or gravid hysterectomy. Hysterotomy abortion is a procedure similar to a caesarean section and is performed under general anesthesia. It requires a smaller incision than a caesarean section and can be used during later stages of pregnancy. Gravid hysterectomy refers to removal of the whole uterus while still containing the pregnancy. Hysterotomy and hysterectomy are associated with much higher rates of maternal morbidity and mortality than D&E or induction abortion.

First trimester procedures can generally be performed using local anesthesia, while second trimester methods may require deep sedation or general anesthesia.

=== Labor induction abortion ===
In places lacking the necessary medical skill for dilation and extraction, or when preferred by practitioners, an abortion can be induced by first inducing labor and then inducing fetal demise if necessary. This is sometimes called "induced miscarriage". This procedure may be performed from 13 weeks gestation to the third trimester. Although it is very uncommon in the United States, more than 80% of induced abortions throughout the second trimester are labor-induced abortions in Sweden and other nearby countries.

Only limited data are available comparing labor-induced abortion with the dilation and extraction method. Unlike D&E, labor-induced abortions after 18 weeks may be complicated by the occurrence of brief fetal survival, which may be legally characterized as live birth. For this reason, labor-induced abortion is legally risky in the United States.

=== Other methods ===
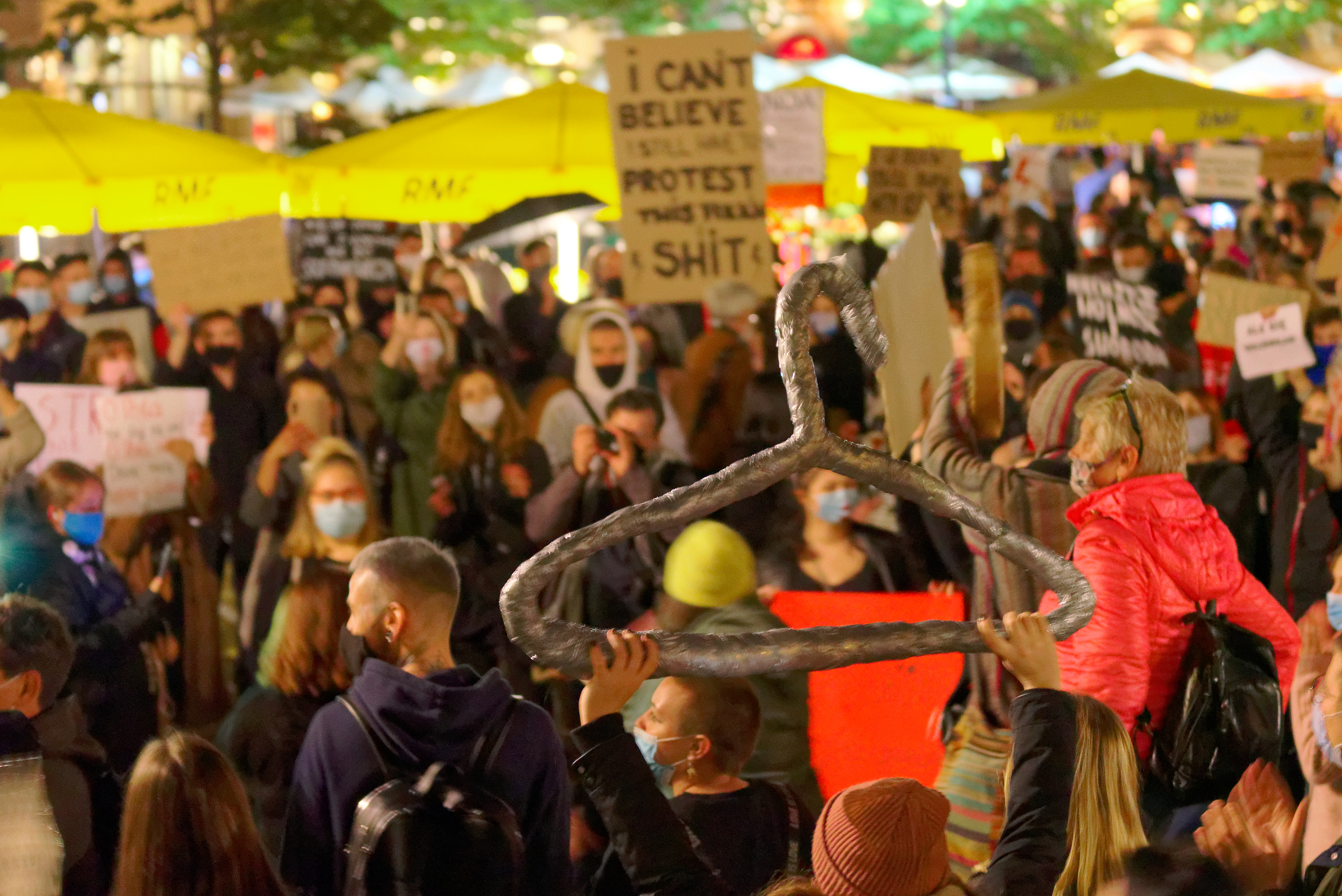
A symbolic coat hanger at a protest against abortion restriction, referencing a dangerous method of self-administered abortion

Historically, a number of herbs reputed to possess abortifacient properties have been used in folk medicine. Such herbs include tansy, pennyroyal, black cohosh, and the now-extinct silphium.

In 1978, one woman in Colorado died and another developed organ damage when they attempted to terminate their pregnancies by taking pennyroyal oil. Because the indiscriminate use of herbs as abortifacients can cause serious—even lethal—side effects, such as multiple organ failure, such use is not recommended by physicians.

Abortion is sometimes attempted by causing trauma to the abdomen. The degree of force, if severe, can cause serious internal injuries without necessarily succeeding in inducing miscarriage. In Southeast Asia, there is an ancient tradition of attempting abortion through forceful abdominal massage. One of the bas reliefs decorating the temple of Angkor Wat in Cambodia depicts a demon performing such an abortion upon a woman who had been sent to the underworld.

Reported methods of unsafe, self-induced abortion include misuse of misoprostol and insertion of non-surgical implements such as knitting needles and clothes hangers into the uterus. These and other methods to terminate pregnancy may be called "induced miscarriage". Such methods are rarely used in countries where surgical abortion is legal and available.

== Safety ==
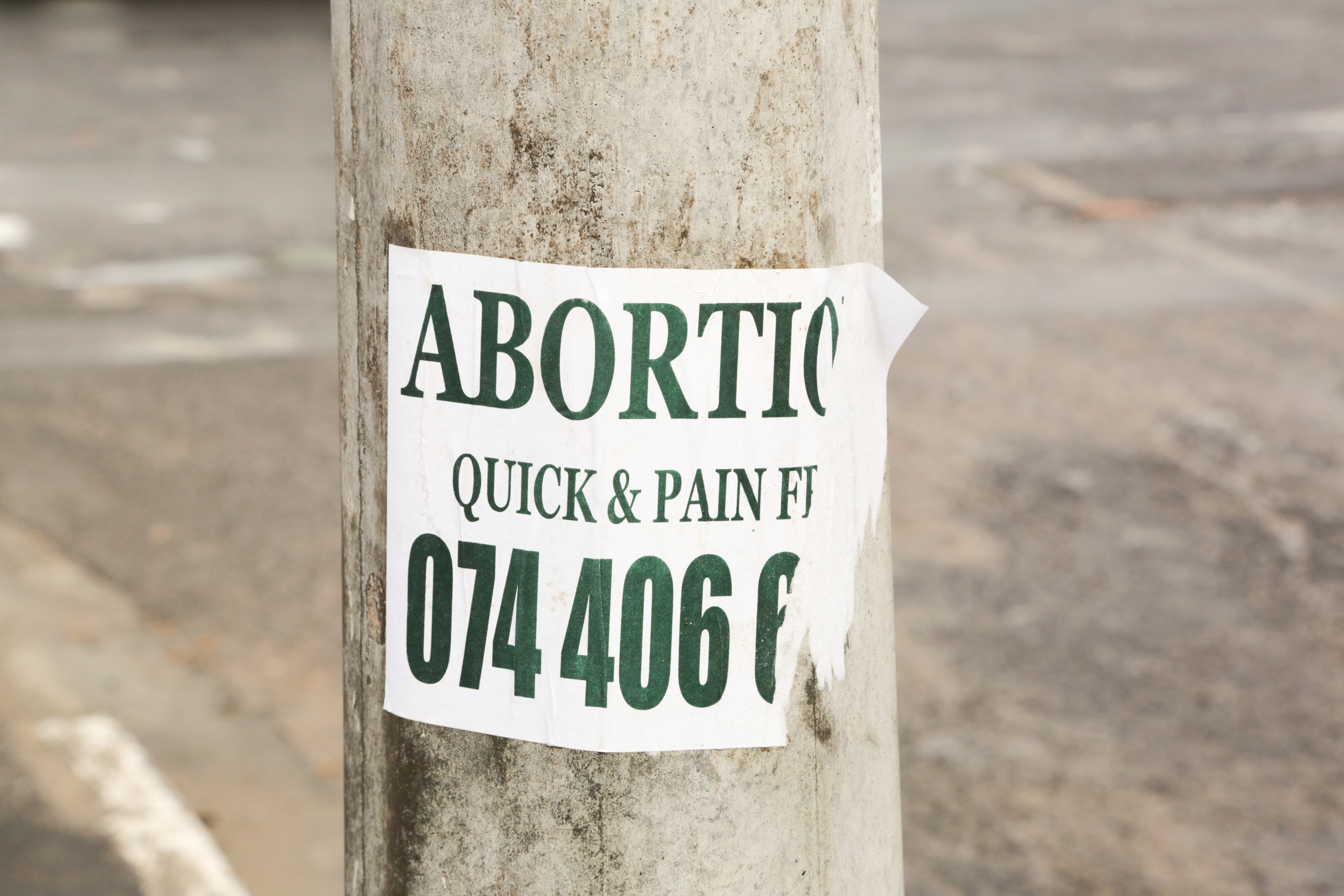
A likely illegal abortion flyer in South Africa

The health risks of abortion depend principally on how, and under what conditions, the procedure is performed. The World Health Organization (WHO) defines unsafe abortions as "a procedure for terminating a pregnancy performed by persons lacking the necessary information or skills or in an environment not in conformity with minimal medical standards, or both". Legal abortions performed in the developed world are among the safest procedures in medicine.

According to a 2012 study in Obstetrics & Gynecology, in the United States the risk of maternal mortality is 14 times lower after induced abortion than after childbirth. The CDC estimated in 2019 that US pregnancy-related mortality was 17.2 maternal deaths per 100,000 live births, while the US abortion mortality rate was 0.43 maternal deaths per 100,000 procedures. In the UK, guidelines of the Royal College of Obstetricians and Gynaecologists state that "Women should be advised that abortion is generally safer than continuing a pregnancy to term." Worldwide, on average, abortion is safer than carrying a pregnancy to term. A 2007 study reported that "26% of all pregnancies worldwide are terminated by induced abortion," whereas "deaths from improperly performed [abortion] procedures constitute 13% of maternal mortality globally." In Indonesia in 2000 it was estimated that 2 million pregnancies ended in abortion, 4.5 million pregnancies were carried to term, and 14–16 percent of maternal deaths resulted from abortion.

In the US from 2000 to 2009, abortion had a mortality rate lower than plastic surgery, lower or similar to running a marathon, and about equivalent to traveling 760 miles (1,220 km) in a passenger car. The risk of abortion-related mortality increases with gestational age, but remains lower than that of childbirth. Outpatient abortion is as safe from 64 to 70 days' gestation as it is before 63 days. A 2019 study indicated that five years after seeking abortion services, women who gave birth after being denied an abortion reported worse health than women who had either first or second trimester abortions.

=== Safety of abortion methods ===
There is little difference in terms of safety and efficacy between medical abortion using a combined regimen of mifepristone and misoprostol and surgical abortion (vacuum aspiration) in early first trimester abortions up to 10 weeks gestation. Medical abortion using the prostaglandin analog misoprostol alone is less effective and more painful than medical abortion using a combined regimen of mifepristone and misoprostol or surgical abortion.

=== Safety and gestational age ===
Vacuum aspiration in the first trimester is the safest method of surgical abortion, and can be performed in a primary care office, abortion clinic, or hospital. Complications, which are rare, can include uterine perforation, pelvic infection, and retained products of conception requiring a second procedure to evacuate. Infections account for one-third of abortion-related deaths in the United States. The rate of complications of vacuum aspiration abortion in the first trimester is similar regardless of whether the procedure is performed in a hospital, surgical center, or office. Preventive antibiotics (such as doxycycline or metronidazole) are typically given before abortion procedures, as they are believed to substantially reduce the risk of postoperative uterine infection; however, antibiotics are not routinely given with abortion pills. The rate of failed procedures does not appear to vary significantly depending on whether the abortion is performed by a doctor or a mid-level practitioner.

Complications after second trimester abortion are similar to those after first trimester abortion, and depend somewhat on the method chosen. The risk of death from abortion approaches roughly half the risk of death from childbirth the farther along a woman is in pregnancy; from one in a million before 9 weeks gestation to nearly one in ten thousand at 21 weeks or more (as measured from the last menstrual period). It appears that having had a prior surgical uterine evacuation (whether because of induced abortion or treatment of miscarriage) correlates with a small increase in the risk of preterm birth in future pregnancies. The studies supporting this did not control for factors not related to abortion or miscarriage, and hence the causes of this correlation have not been determined, although multiple possibilities have been suggested.

=== Mental health ===
Current evidence finds no relationship between most induced abortions and mental health problems other than those expected for any unwanted pregnancy. A report by the American Psychological Association concluded that a woman's first abortion is not a threat to mental health when carried out in the first trimester, with such women no more likely to have mental-health problems than those carrying an unwanted pregnancy to term; the mental-health outcome of a woman's second or greater abortion is less certain. Some older reviews concluded that abortion was associated with an increased risk of psychological problems; however, later reviews of the medical literature found that previous reviews did not use an appropriate control group. When a control group is utilized, receiving abortion is not associated with adverse psychological outcomes. However, women seeking abortion who are denied access to abortion have an increase in anxiety after the denial.

Although some studies show negative mental-health outcomes in women who choose abortions after the first trimester because of fetal abnormalities, more rigorous research would be needed to show this conclusively. Some proposed negative psychological effects of abortion have been referred to by anti-abortion advocates as a separate condition called "post-abortion syndrome", but this is not recognized by medical or psychological professionals in the United States.

A 2020 long term-study among US women found that about 99% of women felt that they made the right decision five years after they had an abortion. Relief was the primary emotion with few women feeling sadness or guilt. Social stigma was a main factor predicting negative emotions and regret years later. The researchers also stated: "These results add to the scientific evidence that emotions about an abortion are associated with personal and social context, and are not a product of the abortion procedure itself."

=== Safety in the abortion debate ===
Some purported risks of abortion are promoted primarily by anti-abortion groups, but lack scientific support. For example, the question of a link between induced abortion and breast cancer has been investigated extensively. Major medical and scientific bodies (including the WHO, National Cancer Institute, American Cancer Society, Royal College of OBGYN and American Congress of OBGYN) have concluded that abortion does not cause breast cancer.

In the past even illegality has not automatically meant that the abortions were unsafe. Referring to the U.S., historian Linda Gordon states: "In fact, illegal abortions in this country have an impressive safety record."

According to Rickie Solinger,

A related myth, promulgated by a broad spectrum of people concerned about abortion and public policy, is that before legalization abortionists were dirty and dangerous back-alley butchers.... [T]he historical evidence does not support such claims.

A 1940s American physician spoke of his pride in having performed 13,844 illegal abortions without any fatalities. In 1870s New York City, the abortionist/midwife Madame Restell (Anna Trow Lohman) is said to have lost very few women among her more than 100,000 patients—a lower mortality rate than the childbirth mortality rate at the time. In 1936, obstetrics and gynecology professor Frederick J. Taussig wrote that a cause of increasing mortality during the years of illegality in the U.S. was that

With each decade of the past fifty years the actual and proportionate frequency of this accident [perforation of the uterus] has increased, due, first, to the increase in the number of instrumentally induced abortions; second, to the proportionate increase in abortions handled by doctors as against those handled by midwives; and, third, to the prevailing tendency to use instruments instead of the finger in emptying the uterus.

=== Unsafe abortion ===
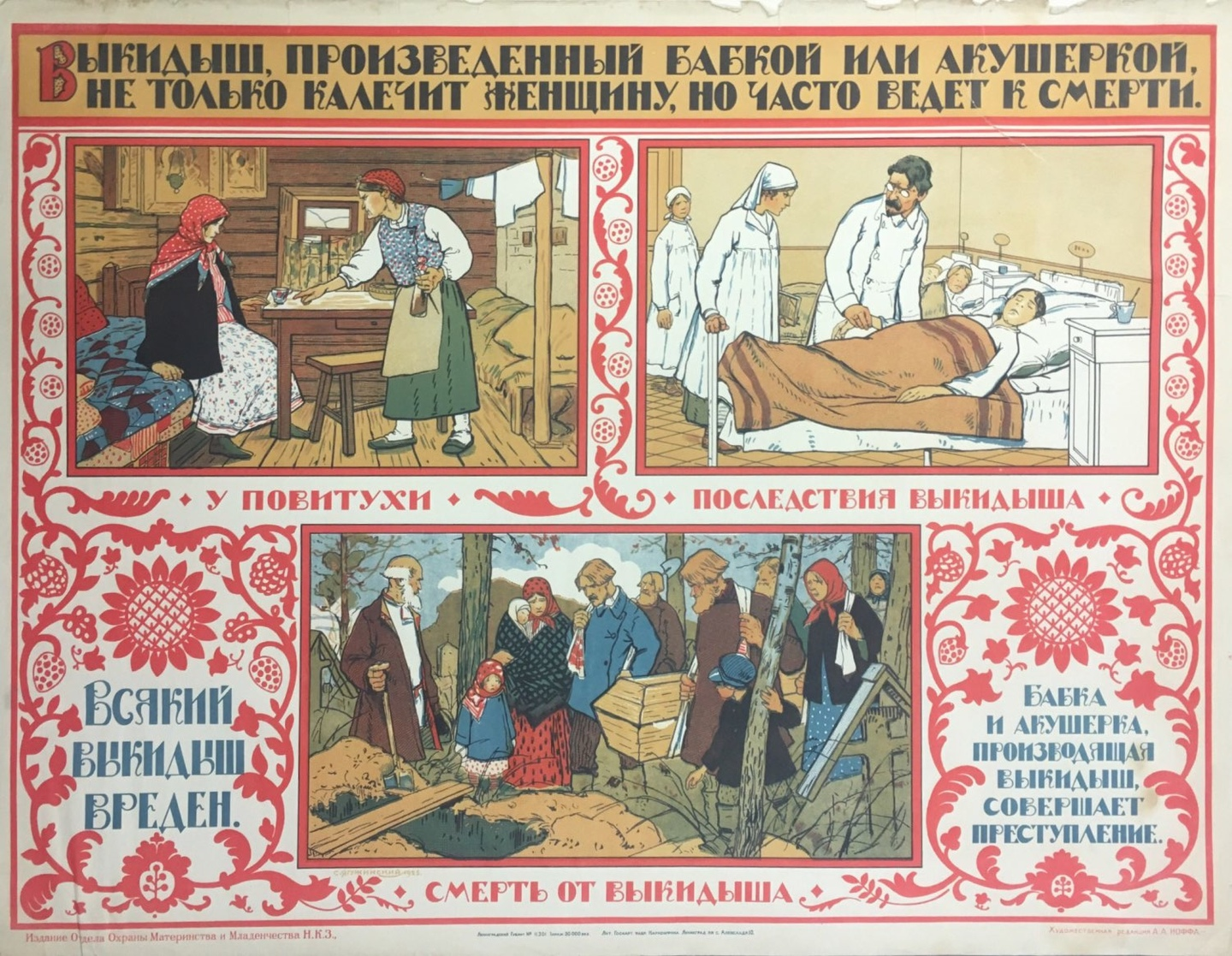
Soviet poster c. 1925 (after Russia legalized abortion in 1920) warning against abortions performed by folk practitioners

Women seeking an abortion may use unsafe methods, especially when abortion is legally restricted. They may attempt self-induced abortion or seek the help of a person without proper medical training or facilities. This can lead to severe complications, such as incomplete abortion, sepsis, hemorrhage, and damage to internal organs.

Unsafe abortions are a major cause of injury and death among women worldwide. Although data are imprecise, it is estimated that approximately 20 million unsafe abortions are performed annually, with 97% taking place in developing countries. Unsafe abortions are believed to result in millions of injuries. Estimates of deaths vary according to methodology, and have ranged from 37,000 to 70,000 in the past decade; deaths from unsafe abortion account for around 13% of all maternal deaths. The World Health Organization believes that mortality has fallen since the 1990s. To reduce the number of unsafe abortions, public health organizations have generally advocated emphasizing the legalization of abortion, training of medical personnel, and ensuring access to reproductive-health services.

A major factor in whether abortions are performed safely or not is the legal standing of abortion. Countries with restrictive abortion laws have higher rates of unsafe abortion and similar overall abortion rates compared to countries where abortion is legal and available. For example, the 1996 legalization of abortion in South Africa led to an immediate reduction in abortion-related complications, with abortion-related deaths dropping by more than 90%. Similar reductions in maternal mortality have been observed after other countries have liberalized their abortion laws, such as Romania and Nepal. A 2011 study concluded that in the United States, some state-level anti-abortion laws are correlated with lower rates of abortion in that state. The analysis, however, did not take into account travel to other states without such laws to obtain an abortion. In addition, a lack of access to effective contraception contributes to unsafe abortion. It has been estimated that the incidence of unsafe abortion could be reduced by up to 75% (from 20 million to 5 million annually) if modern family planning and maternal health services were readily available globally. Rates of such abortions may be difficult to measure because they can be reported variously as miscarriage, "induced miscarriage", "menstrual regulation", "mini-abortion", and "regulation of a delayed/suspended menstruation".

Forty percent of the world's women are able to access therapeutic and elective abortions within gestational limits, while an additional 35 percent have access to legal abortion if they meet certain physical, mental, or socioeconomic criteria. While maternal mortality seldom results from safe abortions, unsafe abortions result in 70,000 deaths and 5 million disabilities per year. Complications of unsafe abortion account for approximately an eighth of maternal mortalities worldwide, though this varies by region. Secondary infertility caused by an unsafe abortion affects an estimated 24 million women. The rate of unsafe abortions has increased from 44% to 49% between 1995 and 2008. Health education, access to family planning, and improvements in health care during and after abortion have been proposed to address consequences of unsafe abortion.

== Incidence ==
There are two commonly used methods of measuring the incidence of abortion:

- Abortion rate – number of abortions annually per 1,000 women of reproductive age, either between 15 and 44 years of age, or 15–49.
- Abortion percentage – number of abortions out of 100 known pregnancies; pregnancies include live births, abortions, and miscarriages.

In many places, where abortion is illegal or carries a heavy social stigma, medical reporting of abortion is not reliable. For this reason, estimates of the incidence of abortion must be made without determining certainty related to standard error. The number of abortions performed worldwide was characterized as stable in the early 2000s, with 41.6 million having been performed in 2003 and 43.8 million having been performed in 2008. The abortion rate worldwide was 28 per 1000 women per year, though it was 24 per 1000 women per year for developed countries and 29 per 1000 women per year for developing countries. The same 2012 study indicated that in 2008, the estimated abortion percentage of known pregnancies was at 21% worldwide, with 26% in developed countries and 20% in developing countries.

On average, the incidence of abortion is similar in countries with restrictive abortion laws and those with more liberal access to abortion. Restrictive abortion laws are associated with increases in the percentage of abortions performed unsafely. The unsafe abortion rate in developing countries is partly attributable to lack of access to modern contraceptives; according to the Guttmacher Institute, providing access to contraceptives would result in about 14.5 million fewer unsafe abortions and 38,000 fewer deaths from unsafe abortion annually worldwide.

The rate of legal, induced abortion varies extensively worldwide. According to the report of employees of Guttmacher Institute it ranged from 7 per 1000 women per year (Germany and Switzerland) to 30 per 1000 women per year (Estonia) in countries with complete statistics in 2008. The proportion of pregnancies that ended in induced abortion ranged from about 10% (Israel, the Netherlands and Switzerland) to 30% (Estonia) in the same group, though it might be as high as 36% in Hungary and Romania, whose statistics were deemed incomplete.

An American study in 2002 concluded that about half of women having abortions were using a form of contraception at the time of becoming pregnant. Inconsistent use was reported by half of those using condoms and three-quarters of those using the birth control pill; 42% of those using condoms reported failure through slipping or breakage. Of the other half of women, who were not using contraception at the time of becoming pregnant, the vast majority had used contraception at some point in the past, indicating some level of dissatisfaction with the contraceptive options available to them. Indeed, 32% of these contraceptive nonusers cited concerns about contraceptive methods as their reason for nonuse, and a more recent study found similar results. Taken together, these statistics suggest that new contraceptive methods, such as non-hormonal contraceptives or male contraceptives, could reduce unintended pregnancy and abortion rates.

The Guttmacher Institute has found that "most abortions in the United States are obtained by minority women" because minority women "have much higher rates of unintended pregnancy". In a 2022 analysis by the Kaiser Family Foundation, while people of color comprise 44% of the population in Mississippi, 59% of the population in Texas, 42% of the population in Louisiana, and 35% of the population in Alabama, they comprise 80%, 74%, 72%, and 70%, respectively, of those receiving abortions.

=== Gestational age and method ===
Histogram of abortions by gestational age in England and Wales during 2019 (left). Abortion in the United States by gestational age, 2016 (right).

Abortion rates vary depending on the stage of pregnancy and the method practiced. In 2003, the Centers for Disease Control and Prevention (CDC) reported that 26% of reported legal induced abortions in the United States were known to have been obtained at the end of 6 weeks of gestation or less, 18% at 7 weeks, 15% at 8 weeks, 18% at 9 through 10 weeks, 10% at 11 through 12 weeks, 6% at 13 through 15 weeks, 4% at 16 through 20 weeks and 1% at more than 21 weeks. 91% of these were classified as having been done by "curettage" (suction-aspiration, dilation and curettage, dilation and evacuation), 8% by "medical" means (mifepristone), >1% by "intrauterine instillation" (saline or prostaglandin), and 1% by "other" (including hysterotomy and hysterectomy). According to the CDC, due to data collection difficulties the data must be viewed as tentative and some fetal deaths reported beyond 20 weeks may be natural deaths erroneously classified as abortions if the removal of the dead fetus is accomplished by the same procedure as an induced abortion.

The Guttmacher Institute estimated there were 2,200 intact dilation and extraction procedures in the US during 2000; this accounts for <0.2% of the total number of abortions performed that year. Similarly, in England and Wales in 2006, 89% of terminations occurred at or under 12 weeks, 9% between 13 and 19 weeks, and 2% at or over 20 weeks. 64% of those reported were by vacuum aspiration, 6% by D&E, and 30% were medical. There are more second trimester abortions in developing countries such as China, India and Vietnam than in developed countries.

There are both medical and non-medical reasons to have an abortion later in pregnancy (after 20 weeks). A study was conducted from 2008 to 2010 at the University of California San Francisco where more than 440 women were asked about why they experienced delays in obtaining abortion care, if there were any. This study found that almost half of individuals who obtained an abortion after 20 weeks did not suspect that they were pregnant until later in their pregnancy. Other barriers to abortion care found in the study included lack of information about where to access an abortion, difficulties with transportation, lack of insurance coverage, and inability to pay for the abortion procedure.

Medical reasons for seeking an abortion later in pregnancy include fetal anomalies and health risk to the pregnant person. There are prenatal tests that can diagnose Down Syndrome or cystic fibrosis as early as 10 weeks into gestation, but structural fetal anomalies are often detected much later in pregnancy. A proportion of structural fetal anomalies are lethal, which means that the fetus will almost certainly die before or shortly after birth. Life-threatening conditions may also develop later in pregnancy, such as early severe preeclampsia, newly diagnosed cancer in need of urgent treatment, and intrauterine infection (chorioamnionitis), which often occurs along with premature rupture of the amniotic sac (PPROM). If serious medical conditions such as these arise before the fetus is viable, the person carrying the pregnancy may pursue an abortion to preserve their own health.

== Motivation ==
=== Personal ===
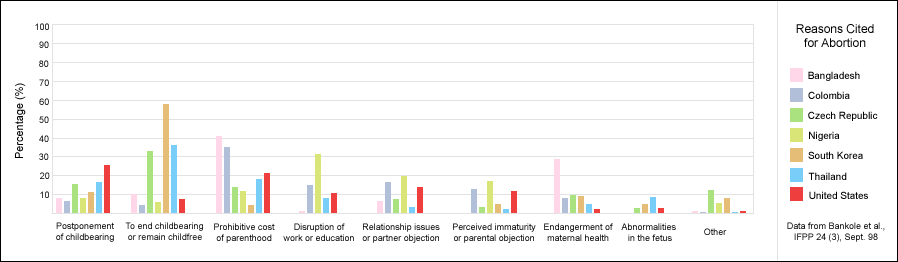
A bar chart depicting selected data from a 1998 AGI meta-study on the reasons women stated for having an abortion

The reasons women have abortions are diverse and vary across the world. Reasons may include an inability to afford a child, domestic violence, lack of support, feeling they are too young, and the wish to complete education or advance a career. Additional reasons include unwillingness or inability to raise a child conceived as a result of rape or incest.

=== Societal ===
Some abortions are undergone as the result of societal pressures. These might include the preference for children of a specific sex or race, disapproval of single or early motherhood, stigmatization of people with disabilities, insufficient economic support for families, lack of access to or rejection of contraceptive methods, or efforts toward population control (such as China's one-child policy). These factors can sometimes result in compulsory abortion or sex-selective abortion. In cultures where there is a preference for male children, some women have sex selective abortions, which have partially replaced the earlier practice of female infanticide.

=== Maternal health ===
Some abortions are performed due to concerns over maternal health. In 1990s, women cited maternal health as their main motivating factor in about a third of abortions in three of 27 countries analyzed. In seven additional countries, about 7% of abortions were maternal health related.

In the U.S., the Supreme Court decisions in Roe v. Wade and Doe v. Bolton: "ruled that the state's interest in the life of the fetus became compelling only at the point of viability, defined as the point at which the fetus can survive independently of its mother. Even after the point of viability, the state cannot favor the life of the fetus over the life or health of the pregnant woman. Under the right of privacy, physicians must be free to use their "medical judgment for the preservation of the life or health of the mother". On the same day that the Court decided Roe, it also decided Doe v. Bolton, in which the Court defined health very broadly: "The medical judgment may be exercised in the light of all factors—physical, emotional, psychological, familial, and the woman's age—relevant to the well-being of the patient. All these factors may relate to health. This allows the attending physician the room he needs to make his best medical judgment."

==== Cancer ====
The rate of cancer during pregnancy is 0.02–1%, and in many cases, cancer of the mother leads to consideration of abortion to protect the life of the mother, or in response to the potential damage that may occur to the fetus during treatment. This is particularly true for cervical cancer, the most common type of which occurs in 1 of every 2,000–13,000 pregnancies, for which initiation of treatment "cannot co-exist with preservation of fetal life (unless neoadjuvant chemotherapy is chosen)". Very early stage cervical cancers (I and IIa) may be treated by radical hysterectomy and pelvic lymph node dissection, radiation therapy, or both, while later stages are treated by radiotherapy. Chemotherapy may be used simultaneously. Treatment of breast cancer during pregnancy also involves fetal considerations, because lumpectomy is discouraged in favor of modified radical mastectomy unless late-term pregnancy allows follow-up radiation therapy to be administered after the birth.

Exposure to a single chemotherapy drug is estimated to cause a 7.5–17% risk of teratogenic effects on the fetus, with higher risks for multiple drug treatments. Treatment with more than 40 Gy of radiation usually causes spontaneous abortion. Exposure to much lower doses during the first trimester, especially 8 to 15 weeks of development, can cause intellectual disability or microcephaly, and exposure at this or subsequent stages can cause reduced intrauterine growth and birth weight. Exposures above 0.005–0.025 Gy cause a dose-dependent reduction in IQ. It is possible to greatly reduce exposure to radiation with abdominal shielding, depending on how far the area to be irradiated is from the fetus.

The process of birth itself may also put the mother at risk. According to Li et al., "[v]aginal delivery may result in dissemination of neoplastic cells into lymphovascular channels, haemorrhage, cervical laceration and implantation of malignant cells in the episiotomy site, while abdominal delivery may delay the initiation of non-surgical treatment."

=== Fetal health ===
Congenital disorders, revealed by prenatal screening, motivate some women to seek abortions. Health outcomes of preterm births include a significant probability of long-term neurodevelopmental impairment before gestational age of 29 weeks, with a higher probability with decreasing gestational age.

In the United States, public opinion shifted after television personality Sherri Finkbine was exposed to thalidomide, a teratogen, in her fifth month of pregnancy. Unable to obtain a legal abortion in the United States, Finkbine traveled to Sweden. From 1962 to 1965, an outbreak of German measles left 15,000 babies with severe birth defects. In 1967, the American Medical Association publicly supported liberalization of abortion laws. A National Opinion Research Center poll in 1965 showed 73% supported abortion when the mother's life was at risk, 57% when birth defects were present and 59% for pregnancies resulting from rape or incest.

== Religion ==
=== Christianity ===
In the Catholic Church, opinion was divided on how serious abortion was in comparison with such acts as contraception and oral or anal sex. The Catholic Church did not begin vigorously opposing abortion until the 19th century. As early as ~100 CE, the Didache taught that abortion was sinful. Several historians argue that prior to the 19th century most Catholic authors did not regard termination of pregnancy before quickening or ensoulment as an abortion. In 1588, Pope Sixtus V (r. 1585–1590) was the first Pope to institute a Church policy labeling all abortion as homicide and condemning abortion regardless of the stage of pregnancy. Sixtus V's pronouncement was reversed in 1591 by Pope Gregory XIV. In the recodification of 1917 Code of Canon Law, Apostolicae Sedis was strengthened, in part to remove a possible reading that excluded excommunication of the mother. Statements made in the Catechism of the Catholic Church, the codified summary of the Church's teachings, considers abortion from the moment of conception as homicide and called for the end of legal abortion.

Denominations that support abortion rights with some limits include the United Methodist Church, Episcopal Church, Evangelical Lutheran Church in America and Presbyterian Church USA. A 2014 Guttmacher survey of abortion patients in the United States found that many reported a religious affiliation: 24% were Catholic while 30% were Protestant. A 1995 survey reported that Catholic women are as likely as the general population to terminate a pregnancy, Protestants are less likely to do so, and evangelical Christians are the least likely to do so. A 2019 Pew Research Center study found that most Christian denominations were against overturning Roe v. Wade, which in the United States legalized abortion, at around 70%, except White Evangelicals at 35%.

=== Judaism ===
In Judaism, the fetus is not considered to have a human soul until it is safely outside of the woman, is viable, and has taken its first breath. The fetus is considered valuable property of the woman and not a human life while in the womb (Exodus 21:22-23). While Judaism encourages people to be fruitful and multiply by having children, abortion is allowed and is deemed necessary when a pregnant woman's life is in danger. Several religions, including Judaism, which disagree that human life begins at conception, support the legality of abortion on religious freedom grounds.

=== Islam ===
In Islam, abortion is traditionally permitted until a point in time when Muslims believe the soul enters the fetus, considered by various theologians to be at conception, 40 days after conception, 120 days after conception, or at quickening. Abortion is largely heavily restricted or forbidden in areas of high Islamic faith such as the Middle East and North Africa.

=== Hinduism ===
Hindu views on abortion are diverse and lack a single authoritative position, shaped by principles like ahimsa (non-violence), karma, and reincarnation, which typically regard it as morally wrong for interrupting the soul's cycle. Ancient scriptures and authoritative texts widely condemn voluntary abortion, referring to it as garbhapāta (womb killing). Scriptures such as the Atharva Veda categorize an "embryo slayer" (bhruõāghni) among the gravest sinners, while the Kaushitaki Upanishad equates abortion to the killing of one's own parents. The Purāṇas also classify bhrūṇa hatyā as one of the Pañca-pātaka (five heinous acts). In the Gautama Dharmasūtra and the Manusmriti, abortion is regarded as a severe transgression resulting in the loss of caste status and the denial of ancestral water liberation for women. Theological perspectives on when a fetus is considered ensouled differ. The Caraka-Veda asserts that ensoulment occurs immediately after fertilization, whereas the Garbha Upanishad presents a developmental view of ensoulment where the fetus gains life at the seventh month. As indicated in the Suśruta Saṁhitā, however, Hindu ideology makes an exception in cases of a threat to the mother's life or severe fetal abnormalities, where it may be ethically permissible to save the mother's life and cause the fetus less suffering, prioritizing lesser harm. Modern opinions differ regionally: In India, a majority view abortion as generally illegal, while in the US, most Hindus support legal access in all or most cases.

== Society and culture ==
=== Abortion debate ===
Induced abortion has long been the source of considerable debate. Ethical, moral, philosophical, biological, religious and legal issues surrounding abortion are related to value systems. Opinions of abortion may be about fetal rights, governmental authority, and women's rights.

In both public and private debate, arguments presented in favor of or against abortion access focus on either the moral permissibility of an induced abortion, or the justification of laws permitting or restricting abortion. The World Medical Association Declaration on Therapeutic Abortion notes, "circumstances bringing the interests of a mother into conflict with the interests of her unborn child create a dilemma and raise the question as to whether or not the pregnancy should be deliberately terminated". Abortion debates, especially pertaining to abortion laws, are often spearheaded by groups advocating one of these two positions. Groups who favor greater legal restrictions on abortion, including complete prohibition, most often describe themselves as "pro-life" while groups who are against such legal restrictions describe themselves as "pro-choice".

The median voters stance on abortion varies by jurisdiction and can result in swing votes.

=== Modern abortion law ===
Legality of abortion by country or territory Legal on request: No gestational limit; Gestational limit after the first 17 weeks; Gestational limit in the first 17 weeks; Unclear gestational limit; Legally restricted to cases of: Risk to woman's life, to her health*, rape*, fetal impairment*, or socioeconomic factors; Risk to woman's life, to her health*, rape, or fetal impairment; Risk to woman's life, to her health*, or fetal impairment; Risk to woman's life*, to her health*, or rape; Risk to woman's life or to her health; Risk to woman's life; Illegal with no exceptions; No information; * Does not apply to some countries or territories in that category Note: In some countries or territories, abortion laws are modified by other laws, regulations, legal principles or judicial decisions. This map shows their combined effect as implemented by the authorities.

Current laws pertaining to abortion are diverse. Religious, moral, and cultural factors continue to influence abortion laws throughout the world. The right to life, the right to liberty, the right to security of person, and the right to reproductive health are major issues of human rights that sometimes constitute the basis for the existence or absence of abortion laws.

In jurisdictions where abortion is legal, certain requirements must often be met before a woman may obtain a legal abortion (an abortion performed without the woman's consent is considered feticide and is generally illegal). These requirements usually depend on the age of the fetus, often using a trimester-based system to regulate the window of legality, or as in the U.S., on a doctor's evaluation of the fetus' viability. Some jurisdictions require a waiting period before the procedure, prescribe the distribution of information on fetal development, or require that parents be contacted if their minor daughter requests an abortion. Other jurisdictions may require that a woman obtain the consent of the fetus' father before aborting the fetus, that abortion providers inform women of health risks of the procedure—sometimes including "risks" not supported by the medical literature—and that multiple medical authorities certify that the abortion is either medically or socially necessary. Many restrictions are waived in emergency situations. China, which has ended its one-child policy and now has a three-child policy, has at times incorporated mandatory abortions as part of its population control strategy.

Other jurisdictions ban abortion almost entirely. Many, but not all, of these allow legal abortions in a variety of circumstances. These circumstances vary based on jurisdiction, but may include whether the pregnancy is a result of rape or incest, the fetus' development is impaired, the woman's physical or mental well-being is endangered, or socioeconomic considerations make childbirth a hardship. In countries where abortion is banned entirely, such as Nicaragua, medical authorities have recorded rises in maternal death directly and indirectly due to pregnancy as well as deaths due to doctors' fears of prosecution if they treat other gynecological emergencies. Some countries, such as Bangladesh, that nominally ban abortion, may also support clinics that perform abortions under the guise of menstrual hygiene. This is also a terminology in traditional medicine. In places where abortion is illegal or carries heavy social stigma, pregnant women may engage in medical tourism and travel to countries where they can terminate their pregnancies. Women on Waves has provided medication abortion and education on a ship in international waters off the coast of countries with restrictive abortion laws. Women without the means to travel can resort to providers of illegal abortions or attempt to perform an abortion by themselves.

=== Sex-selective abortion ===
Sonography and amniocentesis allow parents to determine sex before childbirth. The development of this technology has led to sex-selective abortion, or the termination of a fetus based on its sex. The selective termination of a female fetus is most common.

Sex-selective abortion is partially responsible for the noticeable disparities between the birth rates of male and female children in some countries. The preference for male children is reported in many areas of Asia, and abortion used to limit female births has been reported in Taiwan, South Korea, India, and China. This deviation from the standard birth rates of males and females occurs despite the fact that the country in question may have officially banned sex-selective abortion or even sex-screening.

Many countries have taken legislative steps to reduce the incidence of sex-selective abortion. At the International Conference on Population and Development in 1994 over 180 states agreed to eliminate "all forms of discrimination against the girl child and the root causes of son preference", conditions also condemned by a PACE resolution in 2011. The World Health Organization and UNICEF, along with other United Nations agencies, have found that measures to restrict access to abortion in an effort to reduce sex-selective abortions have unintended negative consequences, largely stemming from the fact that women may seek or be coerced into seeking unsafe, extralegal abortions. On the other hand, measures to reduce gender inequality can reduce the prevalence of such abortions without attendant negative consequences.

=== Anti-abortion violence ===
Abortion providers and facilities have been subjected to violence, including murder, assault, arson, and bombing. Some scholars consider anti-abortion violence to be within the definition of terrorism, a view shared by some governments. In the U.S. and Canada, over 8,000 incidents of violence, trespassing, and death threats have been recorded by providers since 1977, including over 200 bombings/arsons and hundreds of assaults. Abortion clinics have also been targeted by acid attacks, invasions, and vandalism The majority of abortion opponents have not been involved in violent acts.

Physicians and other abortion clinic staff have been murdered by abortion opponents. In the United States, at least four physicians have been murdered in connection with their work at abortion clinics, including David Gunn (1993), John Britton (1994), Barnett Slepian (1998), and George Tiller (2009). In Canada, gynecologist Garson Romalis survived murder attempts in both 1994 and 2000. Besides physicians, killings have targeted other clinic staff, such as John Salvi's 1994 murder of two receptionists in Massachusetts clinic and Peter Knight's 2001 murder of a security guard in a Melbourne clinic. Notable perpetrators of anti-abortion violence include Eric Rudolph, Scott Roeder, Shelley Shannon, and Paul Hill, the first person to be executed in the United States for murdering an abortion provider.

Some countries have laws to protecting access to abortion. Such laws prevent abortion opponents from interfering with access to legal abortion services. For example, the American Freedom of Access to Clinic Entrances Act bars the use of threats or violence to interfere with abortion access. Abortion access laws may also establish safe access zones around abortion clinics, with limits on protests and enhanced penalties for anti-abortion violence.

Psychological pressure may also be used to limit abortion access. Some protestors record women entering clinics on camera.

== Non-human examples ==
Spontaneous abortion occurs in various animals. For example, in sheep it may be caused by stress or physical exertion, such as crowding through doors or being chased by dogs. In cows, abortion may be caused by contagious disease, such as brucellosis or Campylobacter, but can often be controlled by vaccination. Eating pine needles can also induce abortions in cows. Several plants, including broomweed, skunk cabbage, poison hemlock, and tree tobacco, are known to cause fetal deformities and abortion in cattle, and in sheep and goats. In horses, a fetus may be aborted or resorbed if it has lethal white syndrome. Foal embryos that are homozygous for the dominant white gene (WW) are theorized to also be aborted or resorbed before birth. In many species of sharks and rays, stress-induced abortions occur frequently upon capture.

Viral infection can cause abortion in dogs. Cats can experience spontaneous abortion for many reasons, including hormonal imbalance. A combined abortion and spaying are performed on pregnant cats, especially in trap–neuter–return programs, to prevent unwanted kittens from being born. Female rodents may terminate a pregnancy when exposed to the smell of a male not responsible for the pregnancy, known as the Bruce effect.

Abortion may also be induced in animals, in the context of animal husbandry. For example, abortion may be induced in mares that have been mated improperly, or that have been purchased by owners who did not realize the mares were pregnant, or that are pregnant with twin foals. Feticide can occur in horses and zebras due to male harassment of pregnant mares or forced copulation, although the frequency in the wild has been questioned. Male gray langur monkeys may attack females following male takeover, causing miscarriage.

== See also ==
- Abortion doula
- Forced abortion
- My body, my choice
- Indirect abortion
- Sex-selective abortion in Taiwan
- Waiting period

== Bibliography ==
- Coppens C (1907). "Abortion" . In Herbermann C (ed.). Catholic Encyclopedia. Vol. 1. New York: Robert Appleton Company.
- Devereux G (1976). A Study of Abortion in Primitive Societies. International Universities Press. ISBN 978-0-8236-6245-6.
- Doan AE (2007). Opposition and Intimidation: The abortion wars and strategies of political harassment. University of Michigan.
- Ganatra B, Tunçalp Ö, Johnston HB, Johnson BR, Gülmezoglu AM, Temmerman M (March 2014). "From concept to measurement: operationalizing WHO's definition of unsafe abortion". Bulletin of the World Health Organization. 92 (3): 155. doi:10.2471/BLT.14.136333. PMC 3949603. PMID 24700971.
- Hartmann B (1995). Reproductive Rights and Wrongs: The Global Politics of Population Control. South End Press. ISBN 978-0-89608-491-9.
- Koblitz AH (2014). Sex and Herbs and Birth Control: Women and Fertility Regulation Through the Ages. Kovalevskaia Fund. ISBN 978-0-9896655-0-6.
- Riddle JM (1997). Eve's Herbs: A History of Contraception and Abortion in the West. Harvard University Press.
- Sedgh G, Bearak J, Singh S, Bankole A, Popinchalk A, Ganatra B, et al. (July 2016). "Abortion incidence between 1990 and 2014: global, regional, and subregional levels and trends". Lancet. 388 (10041): 258–267. doi:10.1016/S0140-6736(16)30380-4. PMC 5498988. PMID 27179755.
- Gammeltoft TM (2018). "Abortion". The International Encyclopedia of Anthropology. pp. 1–3. doi:10.1002/9781118924396.wbiea1490. ISBN 978-1-118-92439-6. Wikidata Q124418995.
- UN (2002). Abortion Policies: A Global Review 3 vols. Population Division, Department of Economic and Social Affairs, United Nations. Archived from the original on 11 January 2005.
- WHO (2005). The World Health Report 2005: Make every mother and child count. Geneva: World Health Organization. ISBN 92-4-156290-0. Archived from the original on 13 April 2005.
- WHO (2012). Safe abortion: technical and policy guidance for health systems (PDF) (2nd ed.). Geneva: World Health Organization. ISBN 978-92-4-154843-4. Archived (PDF) from the original on 16 January 2015.
- WHO (2016). "Health worker roles in providing safe abortion care and post-abortion contraception". Archived from the original on 29 March 2019.
