= Abortion doula =

Abortion doulas provide care before, during, and after an abortion, with support varying by patient and their informational, emotional, physical, and practical needs.

== Work ==
Abortion doulas provide "nonjudgemental" emotional, physical, informational, and logistical support and care before, during, and after a medical or surgical abortion. Many abortion doulas see their role is to help clients to make informed decisions through their support for reproductive autonomy. A challenge clients often face when accessing abortion doula care is lack of funds, resulting in abortion doulas working pro bono.

Doulas work in a variety of situations, including being clinic-based, in community collectives and as solo practitioners. They may support the person emotionally and physically as they navigate a line of protesters, talk with them about the choice they've made, hold the person's hand or help with finding funding, navigating restrictions, accessing childcare, coordinating travel, and scheduling meal deliveries.

Like other doulas, the abortion doula is concerned solely with the patient rather than having other concerns typical for the medical personnel present for an event. Unlike other types of doulas, an abortion doula may interact with a patient only during the patient's abortion and may never interact with that patient again.

Studies show that women overwhelmingly recommend abortion doula support even though there is no measurable effect on pain or satisfaction. Support from a doula is shown to reduce the need for an additional member of the clinic's staff with physicians and staff generally feeling that the presence of a doula improves a patient's experience. The improved patient experience can include improved mental and physical health and respect for reproductive autonomy through affirmation as moral decision-makers.

== Training and licensure ==
Training varies and may include understanding barriers to health care, societal views of abortion, typical patient needs.

In the United States, as of 2022 there are no certifications specifically for abortion doulas that are administered nationally or through individual states. Because of this, there is no accurate estimate of numbers. In 2019, Bustle estimated there were approximately 30 abortion doula collectives throughout the country.

The work of an abortion doula was developed through the women's health movement in the 1980s where midwifery communities are doula began providing support for childbirth. According to Bustle, the first abortion doula collective was formed in New York City in 2007, as a response to how the culture viewed abortion. Abortion doulas often view their work through a reproductive justice lens that utilizes an intersectional approach.

== United States ==
Restrictive abortion policies in the US exacerbates abortion stigma by patients, providers and doulas. This results in abortion doulas having to decide when and how to disclosure or hide their work.

In the United States following the landmark decision, Dobbs v. Jackson Women's Health Organization, doulas expect to be contacted more frequently about abortion support as access becomes more limited. They are taking precautions to retain online anonymity to better protect patients and themselves and navigating threat of legal action.

== COVID-19 ==
Pre-COVID-19, abortion doulas were typically allowed to remain with the patient through the procedure, but during the pandemic safety concerns meant at some clinics the abortion doula could not accompany the patient.

== See also ==
- Jane Collective
