= Sex-selective abortion in Taiwan =

Sex-selective abortion in Taiwan is the termination of pregnancies based on the fetus' sex in Taiwan. Historically, the practice has been very widespread. It has been illegal in Taiwan since 2011.

According to estimations, during the height of Taiwan's sex-selective abortions in the 2000s, every year 4,000 fetuses were aborted solely due to their sex. For context, the island recorded around 200,000 annual births for most of the decade. Sex-selective abortions still persist, at a reduced level, today. Most sex-selective abortions in Taiwan target females.

== Background ==
Traditional Taiwanese Han culture is patrilineal, with some considering married daughters as "spilled water"; belonging to another lineage. Parents rely on their son and their sons' wife to support them when aged and eventually pass down the family line.

The preference for sons had drastically weakened by the 1990s and 2000s in Taiwan due to urbanization and female workforce participation, yet many lingering cultural ideologies prevailed in some families, which led to a male-skewed sex ratio at birth. Unlike Vietnam and South Korea—which have officially punished physicians for revealing the sex of the fetus, and reached 115.1 and 116.5 boys per 100 girls in their respective peaks—Taiwan's peak occurred when there was no legal punishment for revealing fetal sex, and was lower at 110.7 boys per 100 girls.

== History ==
=== Initial spike and temporary reversal (1980s–1990s) ===
The sex ratio at birth in Taiwan in the 1960s and 1970s averaged 106 boys per 100 girls.

Legalized abortion, low fertility and the availability of sex screening, paired with the underlying son preference of Chinese culture, drives the incentive for sex-selective abortions. Abortion in Taiwan was legalized in 1985, at around the time fertility dropped below the self-sustaining replacement level (the total fertility rate was 2.4 in 1981 and dropped to 1.68 in 1986) and ultrasound sex screening became widespread.

The sex ratio at birth in Taiwan rose from 106.2 boys per 100 girls in 1985, to 110.5 boys per 100 girls in 1991. The first wave of sex selective abortions weakened in the early 1990s, due to rumors of the surgeries harming the birthed males' health, which made the sex ratio at birth fall to 107-108 males per 100 females by the mid 1990s.

Sex ratio at birth by birth order in Taiwan, 1985–1995
Year	Overall	1st birth	2nd birth	3rd and later births
1985	106.23			
1986	107.53			
1987	108.37	107.24	108.24	110.82
1988	108.20	107.30	106.88	111.98
1989	108.61	107.02	106.95	114.80
1990	110.29	106.79	108.68	120.77
1991	110.45	107.41	108.50	120.33
1992	109.93	108.04	107.52	118.49
1993	108.12	107.13	106.68	112.89
1994	108.88	107.84	107.32	114.14
1995	107.91	107.04	105.52	114.62

=== Widespread sex selection (2000s) ===
By the early 2000s, the sex ratio at birth in Taiwan saw renewed growth, with 107-108 boys per 100 girls in the mid-late 1990s to the all-time peak of 110.7 boys per 100 girls in 2004, due to lowering fertility rates and improving sex determination skills.

Live births in Taiwan (1997–2010)
Year	Births	Fertility rate
1997	326,002	1.77
1998	271,450	1.47
1999	283,661	1.56
2000	307,200	1.68
2001	259,220	1.4
2002	245,537	1.34
2003	227,611	1.24
2004	216,691	1.18
2005	206,431	1.12
2006	204,444	1.12
2007	204,414	1.1
2008	198,730	1.05
2009	191,310	1.03
2010	166,886	0.90

Sex ratio at birth in Taiwan by parity (2001–2009)
Year	Total	1st birth	2nd birth	3rd and later births
2001	108.70	106.88	105.79	122.78
2002	109.80	106.89	109.08	123.96
2003	110.15	107.66	108.91	125.77
2004	110.66	108.73	109.42	124.26
2005	109.04	107.71	107.07	122.35
2006	109.61	107.24	108.17	127.12
2007	109.71	107.88	108.91	122.67
2008	109.66	108.59	108.40	120.04
2009	108.37	106.66	107.60	122.04

This sex ratio of higher parity births was consistently above 120 boys per 100 girls in the 2000s, peaking at 127.1 boys per 100 girls in 2006. Although the sex ratio at birth peaked in this decade, it does does not indicate that son preference was stronger in the 2000s compared to the 1990s. In a 2005 survey, the percentage of parents that preferred daughters was almost balanced with those that preferred sons.

Taiwanese parents' stated child-sex preferences, 2005
Respondent	No sex preference	Preferred son	Preferred daughter
Mothers	52.6%	24.8%	22.5%
Fathers	55.8%	24.3%	19.9%

=== Government ban and decline (2010s) ===
In 2010, the government of Taiwan placed a ban on abortions solely based on fetal sex, which came to effect on January 13, 2011. As a result of the ban, doctors can be fined or face professional discipline if they illegally reveal fetal sex for non-health reasons before the gestational limit has expired.

The government has also set up a hotline for people to report illegal sex-selective abortions.

The ban was effective, and in 2012 the sex ratio at birth had dropped to 107.4, and dropped further to a low of 106.9 in 2014.

=== Present day ===
The sex ratio at birth of the 1st parity has exceeded that of the 2nd parity in 2022, similar to that of mainland China in recent years, consistent with extreme low fertility and 1st parity selection. The high parity sex ratio hovers around 110 boys per 100 girls.

Sex ratio at birth in Taiwan by birth order, 2023–2025
Year	Total	1st birth	2nd birth	3rd and later births
2023	107.78	108.11	106.16	111.08
2024	107.46	107.80	106.52	108.69
2025	107.19	107.95	104.96	110.12

The Taiwanese government has acknowledged the existence of sex-selective abortions today, and is continuing to work to enforce the established ban.

== Consequences of sex selective abortion ==
Positive effect

Prior to sex screening and abortion legalization, parents wanting a son had to keep giving birth until getting a son, leading to many unwanted daughters which were more likely to receive worse healthcare and nutrition. This was largely replaced by sex-selective abortions by the late 1980s/early 1990s, leading to a lower neonatal death rate for girls.

Negative effect

The sex ratio of those aged 30 in Taiwan in 2021 is 108.73 males per 100 females, compared to 100.03 males per 100 females of 30 year olds in the US the same year, causing a marraige squeeze and need of foreign brides. Sex-selective abortion partially contributed to Taiwan's low birth rate.

== See also ==
- Sex-selective abortion in South Korea
