= Osmotic dilator =

Medical device to dilate the uterine cervix

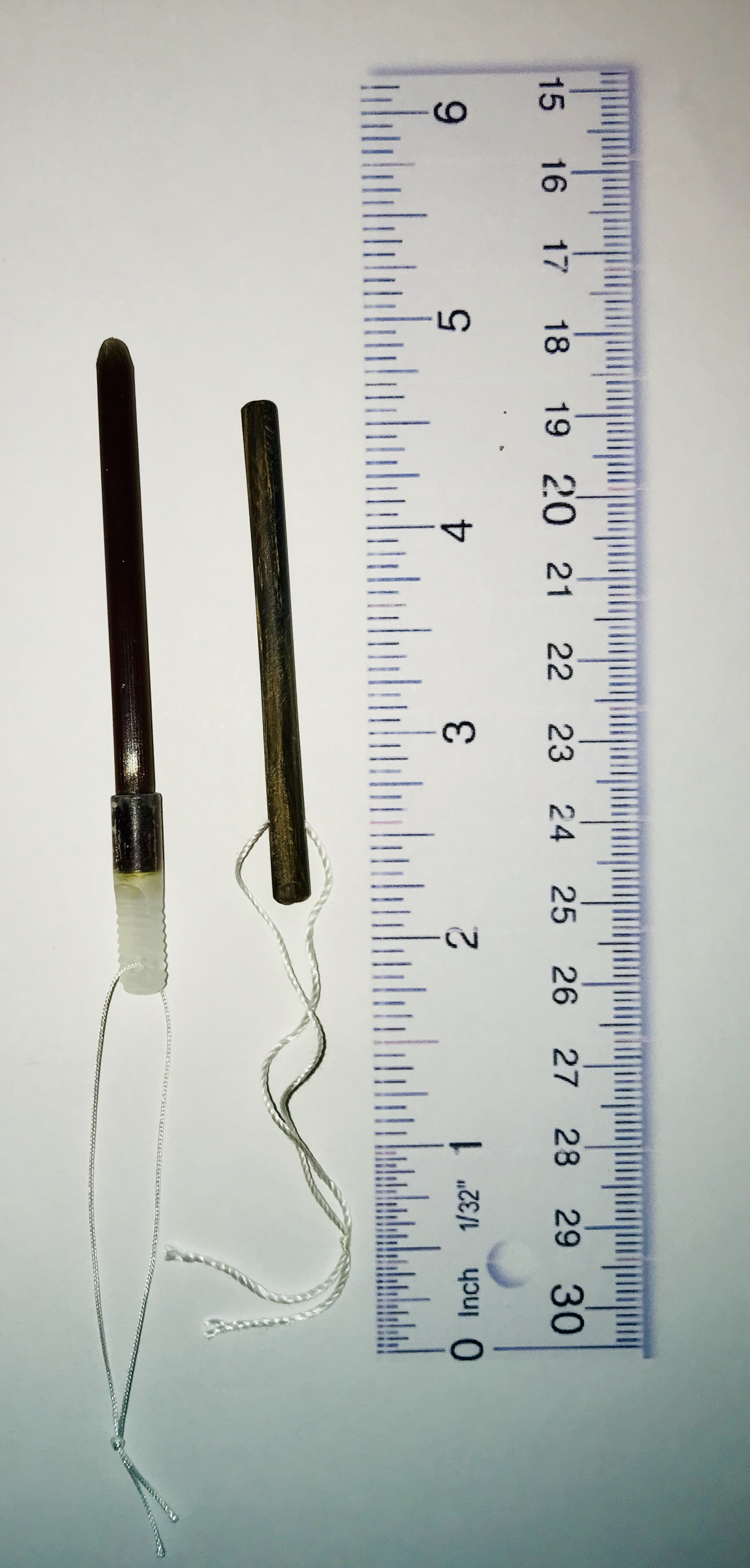
Osmotic dilators prior to expansion. Dilapan-S (left). Laminaria (right)

Osmotic dilators, also known as hygroscopic dilators, are medical implements used to dilate the uterine cervix by swelling as they absorb fluid from surrounding tissue. They may be composed of natural or synthetic materials. A laminaria stick or tent is a thin rod made of the stems of dried Laminaria, a genus of kelp. Laminaria sticks can be generated from Laminaria japonica and Laminaria digitata. Second generation dilators such as Dilapan-S are composed of polyacrylonitrile, a plastic polymer. The hygroscopic nature of the polymer causes the dilator to absorb fluid and expand.

== Use in obstetrics and gynecology ==
Osmotic dilators are most commonly used to slowly dilate and soften the cervix prior to surgical abortion, a process referred to as cervical preparation. Adequate cervical preparation is important prior to surgical abortions because it helps to prevent complications of dilation and evacuation (D&E), such as laceration of the cervix. Cervical preparation can be accomplished with osmotic dilators, with medications such as prostaglandins and/or mifepristone, or with a combination of these. However, there is no consensus as to which cervical preparation method is superior in terms of safety and efficacy.

At later gestational ages, osmotic dilators, including laminaria, may be used to assist in dilating the cervix. Most abortion providers use laminaria, Dilapan-S, or both for osmotic dilation prior to surgical abortion after 16–18 weeks gestation.

Osmotic dilators may also be used to achieve cervical dilation prior to gynecology procedures, such as hysteroscopy or dilation and curettage of the non-pregnant uterus, although this is uncommon.

=== Placement ===
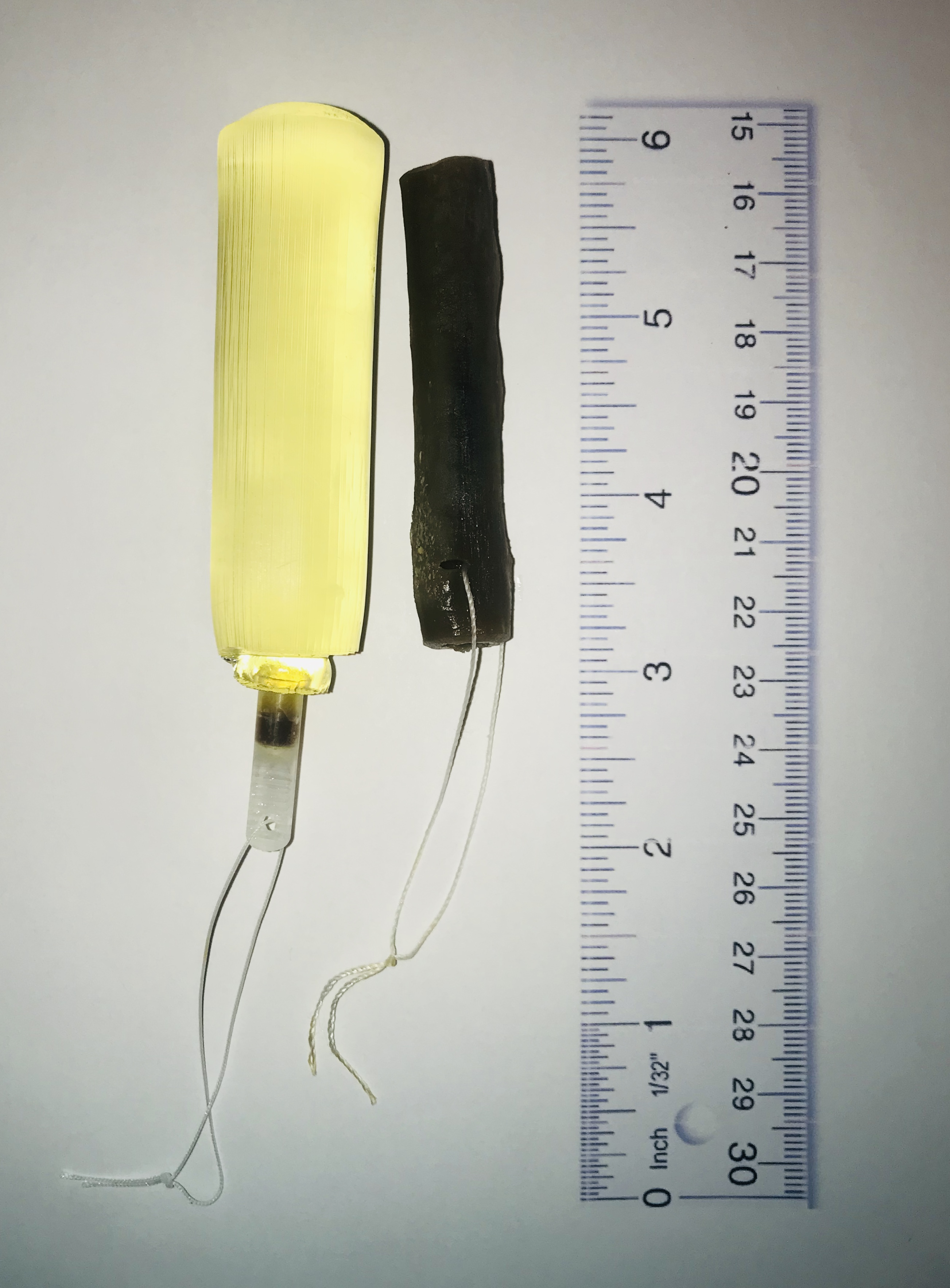
Osmotic dilators after soaking in water for 24 hours. Dilapan-S (left). Laminaria (right). This does not represent the amount of expansion that would occur when used in humans.

Prior to a planned surgical abortion, osmotic dilator(s) may be inserted into a woman's cervix. A speculum is placed in the vagina to allow the provider to see the uterine cervix. A tenaculum may be placed on the anterior lip of the cervix to straighten the cervical canal and hold the cervix steady. Pain medications may be administered via a paracervical block. The dilator is then grasped with a ring forceps and is placed into the cervix so that it spans both the internal cervical os and external cervical os. Over time, the osmotic dilator absorbs fluid and swells to 3-4 times the initial diameter. Most of the increase in size occurs within 6 hours after the dilator are placed in the cervix, though further expansion will continue over 12–24 hours. The number of osmotic dilators placed depends on the degree of cervical dilation that is sought. This may be affected by the gestational age of the pregnancy and history of prior vaginal deliveries. More dilators are generally used with advancing gestational age.

Laminaria tents are usually left in place overnight.

=== Mechanism of action ===
Laminaria function by absorbing fluid from the surrounding tissue and expanding. Thus exerts radial pressure on the cervix. They also cause the release of prostaglandins.

=== Removal ===
Laminaria are removed prior to initiating the D&E, after they have started the process of dilating the cervix. They are removed by grasping the strings of the dilator and applying gentle traction. The cervix may be dilated further using rigid cervical dilators which serially increase in diameter.

=== Effectiveness ===
There is no evidence regarding the risk of not achieving vaginal delivery within 24 hours with laminaria compared to prostaglandin E2 but there may be a lower risk of uterine hyperstimulation with laminaria. It is not certain whether the risks of caesarian section, perinatal death or maternal death are reduced or increased with laminaria compared with vaginal or cervical prostaglandin E2.

=== Risks ===
The incidence of complications related to osmotic dilator use prior to abortion has not been systematically studied and reported, but serious complications appear to be very rare. Risks of osmotic dilator insertion include pain, rupture of amniotic membranes, initiation of labor, cervical or uterine perforation, retention of the dilator, and infection.

Original Dilapan dilators were prone to fracturing under tension during removal which sometimes led to retention of dilator fragments within the uterus. Dilapan was subsequently removed from the market and replaced with Dilapan-S which is less prone to fragmentation. Dilapan may expand unevenly within the cervix and develop a dumbbell shape which can result in difficult removal.
