= Dilation and evacuation =

Gynecological procedure

- D&E

Background
- Abortion type: Surgical
- First use: 1970s
- Gestation: 13–24 weeks

Dilation and evacuation (D&E) or dilatation and evacuation (British English) is the dilation of the cervix and surgical evacuation of the uterus (potentially including the fetus, placenta and other tissue) after the first trimester of pregnancy. It is the most common method and procedure for abortions in the second trimester of pregnancy. The procedure can also be used to remove a miscarried fetus from the womb.

In various health care centers it may be called by different names:

- D&E (dilation and evacuation)
- ERPOC (evacuation of retained products of conception)
- TOP or STOP ((surgical) termination of pregnancy)

D&E normally refers to a specific second trimester procedure. However, some sources use the term D&E to refer more generally to any procedure that involves the processes of dilation and evacuation, which includes the first trimester procedures of manual and electric vacuum aspiration. Intact dilation and extraction (D&X) is a different procedural variation on D&E.

Dilation and evacuation procedures have been increasingly banned in US states since the Dobbs v. Jackson Women's Health Organization decision overruled the right to an abortion.

== Indications for D&E ==
Dilation and evacuation (D&E) is one of the methods available to completely remove the fetus and all of the placental tissue in the uterus after the first trimester of pregnancy. A D&E may be performed for a surgical abortion, or for surgical management of a miscarriage.

=== Abortion ===
Induced abortion after the first trimester of pregnancy is rare. Approximately 930,000 abortions were documented in the US in 2020. Of these, 492,000 were medication abortions. Fewer than 10% of all abortions in the United States are performed after 13 weeks of gestation, and just over 1% are performed after 21 weeks of gestation. The Guttmacher Institute estimated there were 2,200 intact dilation and extraction procedures in the US during 2000; this accounts for <0.2% of the total number of abortions performed that year.In the United States, 95–99% of abortions after the first trimester of pregnancy are performed by surgical abortion via dilation and evacuation.

People who do not have access to affordable abortion care in their area or who face legal restrictions to obtaining a wanted abortion may wait longer to get an abortion after they make the decision to terminate their pregnancy. When an abortion is delayed, a D&E may be necessary. Other factors that often lead to an abortion in the second trimester are late testing for pregnancy, insurance or funding barriers, or delayed provider referral.

Abortion can be considered in the case of congenital anomalies, including genetic aneuploidies and anatomic anomalies, especially since they may not be identified until the second trimester. Other medical indications for an abortion in the second trimester include preeclampsia with severe features or preterm premature rupture of membranes prior to a viable fetal age.

=== Miscarriage ===
Dilation and evacuation can be offered for the management of second trimester miscarriage if skilled providers are available. Some women choose D&E over labor induction for a second trimester loss because it can be a scheduled surgical procedure, offering predictability over labor induction, or because they find it emotionally easier than undergoing labor and delivery. The risks of maternal morbidity during an induction of labor are higher compared to dilation and evacuation. Additionally, a subsequent dilation and curettage procedure for retained placental products may be required after an induction of labor for a miscarriage. Both a labor induction and dilation and evacuation offer the option of fetal and placental testing. Although pregnancy loss is emotionally distressing, there are rarely medical complications associated with a short (<1 week) delay to management.

=== Molar pregnancy ===
Dilation and evacuation is also a treatment option for a molar pregnancy, especially for those who wish to maintain fertility. The procedure is typically done under sonographic guidance as soon as a hydatidiform mole is suspected.

== Description of procedure ==
=== Cervical preparation ===
Prior to the procedure, cervical preparation with osmotic dilators or medications is recommended in order to reduce the risk of complications such as cervical laceration and to facilitate cervical dilation during the procedure. Although there is no consensus as to which method of cervical preparation is superior in terms of safety and technical ease of the procedure, one particular concern is reducing the risk of preterm birth. Concerns within the medical community have advised against or at least asked for further research concerning the safety of performing the dilation of the cervix on the same day as the surgery for some or all second trimester pregnancies. The concern is that performing the dilation too soon before the surgery could increase the risk of preterm birth should the woman ever carry a subsequent pregnancy to term. However, for dilation and evacuation at greater than 20 weeks gestation, at least one day of cervical preparation is recommended, with the option of serial dilation for more than one day. Dilation can be achieved with either osmotic dilation or misoprostol, although osmotic dilation with either laminaria or Dilapan is recommended.

=== Anesthesia options ===
Most patients will be provided NSAIDs for pain management. Local anesthetics, such as lidocaine, are frequently injected by the cervix to reduce pain during the procedure. IV sedation may also be used. General anesthesia may be used depending on individual circumstances, however it is not preferred as it adds significant anesthesia risks to the procedure.

=== Infection prophylaxis ===
Immediately prior to the procedure, antibiotics of either doxycycline or azithromycin are usually administered to prevent infection.

=== Thromboprophylaxis ===
Prophylaxis for venous thromboembolism is not typically required for this procedure.

=== Surgical procedure ===
A speculum is placed in the vagina to allow visualization of the cervix. If osmotic dilators were placed prior to the procedure, these are removed.

The cervix may be further dilated with rigid dilator instruments such as Hegar and Pratt dilators (as opposed to osmotic dilators). Sufficient cervical dilation decreases the risk of morbidity, including cervical injury and uterine perforation. Uterine contents are removed using a cannula to apply aspiration, followed by forceps to remove fetal parts. Tissue inspection ensures removal of the fetus in its entirety. The procedure may be performed under ultrasound guidance to aid in visualizing uterine anatomy and to assess if all tissue has been removed at the completion of the procedure. Operative ultrasonography is beneficial because it can reduce the risk of uterine perforation.

The procedure usually takes less than half an hour.

=== Uterotonics ===
There is no consensus on the routine use of perioperative or postoperative uterotonic medications. While many providers use these agents, there is no definitive evidence to support a decreased risk for bleeding under 20 weeks gestation.

=== Recovery ===
D&E is usually performed in the outpatient setting, and the patient can be safely sent home the same day after a period of observed recovery, ranging from 45 minutes to several hours. Generally, the woman may return to work the following day. The type of anesthesia given also influences the appropriate amount of recovery time before discharge. There is rarely a need for narcotic pain medications afterwards, and NSAIDs are recommended for home pain management. Recovery from the procedure is typically fast and uncomplicated.

Some women may experience lactation after a second-trimester loss or termination of pregnancy. Limited data exists for the efficacy of medications to suppress lactation. However, one randomized control trial found cabergoline to be effective in preventing breast symptoms of engorgement, leakage, and tenderness after a second-trimester loss or termination of pregnancy.

=== Variations ===
If the fetus is removed intact, the procedure is referred to as intact dilation and extraction by the American Medical Association, and referred to as "intact dilation and evacuation" by the American Congress of Obstetricians and Gynecologists (ACOG).

== Risks ==
D&E is a safe procedure when performed by experienced practitioners. The rate of mortality for all types of legal abortion procedures in the US (not specifically D&E) is 0.43 abortion-related deaths per 100,000 reported legal abortions. There were four identified deaths related to abortion in the US during 2019, out of 625,000 abortions. The strongest risk factor for mortality following abortion is increasing gestational age.

Risks of D&E include bleeding, infection, uterine perforation, retained products of conception, and cervical laceration. Hemorrhage occurs following less than 1% of all surgical abortions. Infection rates following second trimester abortion have been reported to be 0.1–4%. The risk of infection is decreased by the use of antibiotics. The risk of retained products of conception and uterine perforation are both under 1%. The risk of cervical laceration is up to 3%. Even rarer, a hysterectomy or damage to surrounding organs or tissues (i.e. bowel or omentum) can occur during a D&E.

There is no evidence that surgical abortion causes an increase in infertility or adverse outcomes in subsequent pregnancies.

== Alternatives ==
Alternatives to D&E include labor induction abortion and medical abortion.

Complication rates after D&E are lower than those of labor induction (medical abortion) after 13 weeks, as has been established through multiple studies. Additionally, in certain clinical scenarios—severe anemia, for example—D&E may be preferred over labor induction.

== Law ==
The laws in the United States surrounding dilation and evacuation have been rapidly evolving since the Dobbs v. Jackson Women's Health Organization decision in 2022. Proposals to limit abortion access sometimes target specific procedures such as D&E, though this also restricts access for non-abortion patients, such as those with pregnancy loss. Kansas was the first state to ban D&E in 2015; later it was struck down in 2016. Currently, D&E is specifically banned in thirty-four states, except when deemed necessary for the preservation of the patient's life. Twenty-one states have banned a "partial-birth" abortion, referring to an intact dilation and extraction. Three of the twenty-one states have a health exception, and seventeen states allow an exception for life endangerment.

Abortion laws in Europe, including dilation and evacuation, vary by country.

== Physician training ==
A national survey of 190 US obstetrics and gynecology residency program directors in 2018 found that 22% considered their graduates to have had enough training in dilation and evacuation to be competent. After Dobbs v. Jackson, almost half of the US obstetrics and gynecology programs are located in states that have implemented abortion restrictions, which will further limit training in dilation and evacuation. The Accreditation Council for Graduate Medical Education states that these programs must either adapt by sending residents to legal jurisdictions where they are able to obtain this training or include uterine evacuation simulations in the educational curriculum.

== See also ==
- Abortion
- Late-term abortion
- Intact dilation and extraction
