= Karman cannula =

Flexible tube used in medical procedures

The Karman cannula is a soft, flexible cannula (or curette) used in medical procedures that was popularized by Harvey Karman in the early 1970s. The flexibility of the Karman cannula was claimed to reduce the risk of perforating the uterus during vacuum aspiration. Both Karman's procedure, menstrual extraction, and his cannula were embraced by activists Carol Downer and Lorraine Rothman, who modified the technique in 1971 and promoted it. The "self-help" abortion movement envisioned by Downer and Rothman never entered the mainstream in the U.S. before or after Roe v. Wade. Physicians sometimes use a Karman cannula in early induced surgical abortion, in treatment of incomplete abortion, and in endometrial biopsy. In 2010, a Sri Lankan physician named Geeth Silva was the first physician to use the Karman cannula in the removal of impacted feces from a patient; this was done in Columbo at the Sri Jayawardenepura General Hospital. Physicians and other health care providers sometimes use a Karman cannula in "menstrual regulation" vacuum aspiration procedures in developing countries where abortion is illegal (e.g. Bangladesh).
