= Endometrial biopsy =

Diagnostic medical procedure

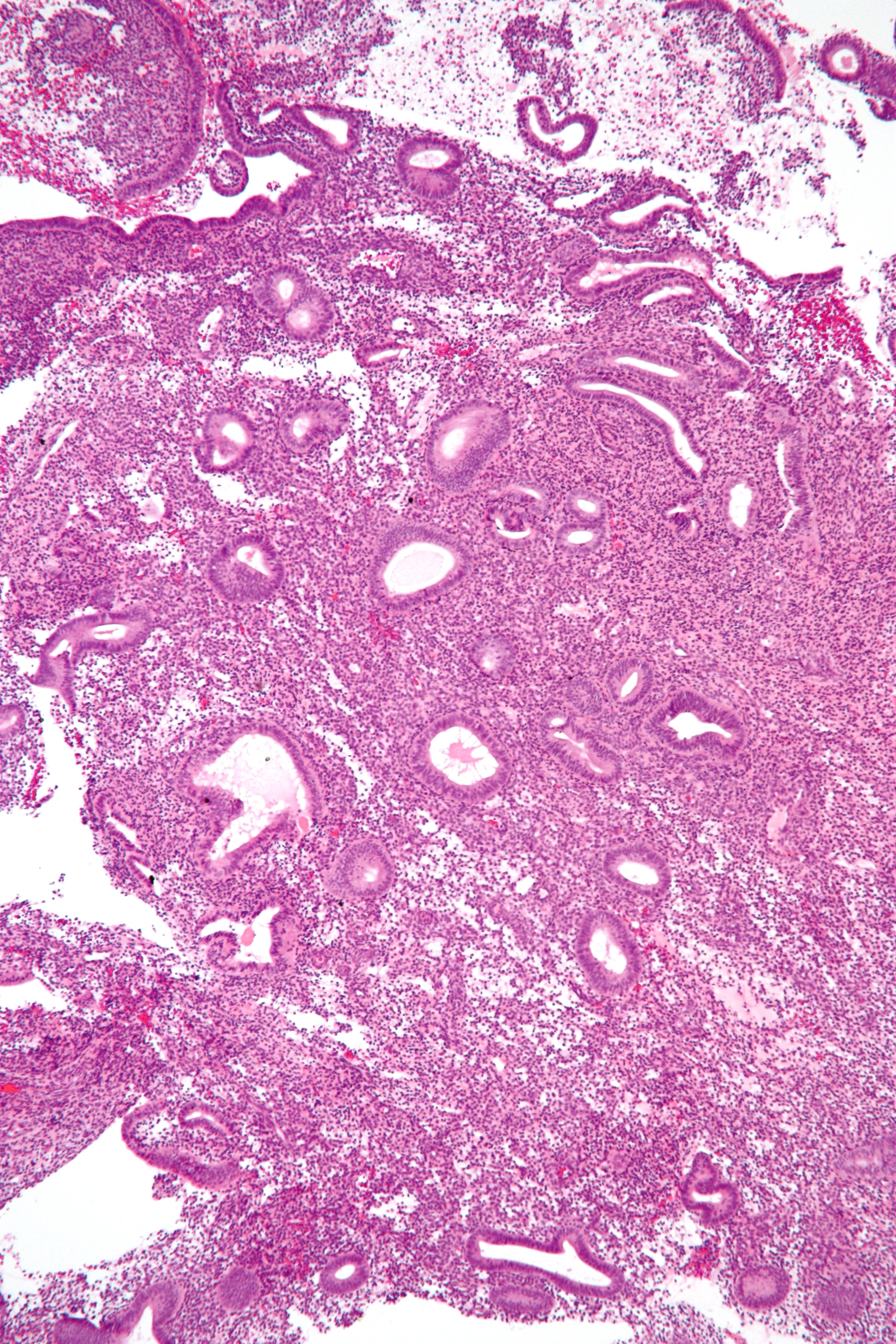
- Micrograph showing an endometrial biopsy with simple endometrial hyperplasia, where the gland-to-stroma ratio is preserved but the glands have an irregular shape and/or are dilated. H&E stain.
- Synonyms: EMB; Uterine biopsy
- ICD-10-PCS: 0UDB
- ICD-9-CM: 68.13, 68.16
- MedlinePlus: 003917

The endometrial biopsy is a medical procedure that involves taking a tissue sample of the lining of the uterus. The tissue subsequently undergoes a histologic evaluation which aids the physician in forming a diagnosis.

== Medical uses ==
There are several indications for obtaining an endometrial biopsy from a non-pregnant woman:

- Women with chronic anovulation, such as the polyendocrine metabolic ovarian syndrome (PMOS), are at increased risk for endometrial problems, and an endometrial biopsy may be useful to assess their lining specifically to rule out endometrial hyperplasia or cancer.
- In women with abnormal vaginal bleeding the biopsy may indicate the presence of abnormal lining such as endometrial hyperplasia or cancer.
- In patients with suspected uterine cancer, the biopsy may discover the presence of cancer cells in the endometrium or cervix.
- In female infertility, the assessment of the lining can determine, if properly timed, that the patient ovulated; however, the same information can be obtained by a blood test of the progesterone level.

Transvaginal ultrasonography is generally done before obtaining an endometrial biopsy, as it may help in the gynecologic diagnosis, or even make the taking of a biopsy superfluous if the lining is thin. If the endometrial lining is less than 5 mm thick on sonography, it is highly unusual to encounter endometrial cancer.

The test is usually done in women over age 35. A more thorough histologic evaluation can be obtained by a dilatation and curettage, which requires anesthesia.

== Contraindications ==
The procedure is contraindicated in pregnancy. Therefore, women in the reproductive years may need a pregnancy test before a biopsy is taken to assure that the test is not done during a pregnancy. Other contraindications are pelvic inflammatory disease and coagulopathies.

An endometrial biopsy usually cannot be done as an office procedure in children, young women, women with vaginismus, or women with cervical stenosis. If necessary, an examination under anesthesia could be performed at which time a biopsy could be taken.

== Risks ==
While the procedure is generally considered safe, cramps or pelvic pain are common but short-lived side effects. After the procedure, the patient may experience some bleeding. Uterine perforation and uterine infections are rare complications.

== Pain ==
Endometrial biopsy pain is quite common. The reason that some doctors spray lidocaine onto the cervix before the procedure is to help deal with some of the pain from the biopsy. The lidocaine spray can burn when it is sprayed into the area, but dissipates with time as the medicine takes effect. Some people will need a reapplication of pain management medication if the first application is not successfully numbing. The metal clamp that is put into the cervix can be another cause of pain, as it sounds and dilates the cervix for access to the uterus. The biopsy procedure itself entails the doctor procuring a piece of the uterine lining, and is normally experienced as being painful. Most of the time, scrape and suction of the endometrial tissue will only be required once, but sometimes the procedure can entail two or three instances of procuring a piece of the endometrium. This is more common in cases where the patient is experiencing active bleeding or displaying symptoms of endometrial hyperplasia.

== Procedure ==

Generally, an endometrial biopsy follows this process:

1. The patient is asked to lie on the table with her feet in the stirrups for a pelvic examination. She may or may not be given localized anesthesia.
2. A speculum will be inserted into the vagina to spread the walls of the vagina apart to expose the cervix. The cervix will then be cleansed with an antiseptic solution.
3. A tenaculum, a type of forceps, will hold the cervix steady for the biopsy.
4. The biopsy curette will be inserted into the uterine fundus, and with a scraping and rotating motion, some tissue will be removed.
5. The removed tissue will be placed in formalin or equivalent for preservation.
6. The tissue will be sent to a laboratory, where it will be processed and tested. It will then be read microscopically by a pathologist who will provide a histologic diagnosis.

Both the application of the tenaculum as well as the removal of tissue by the biopsy may cause pain. Patients, in general, may want to take some pain medication (such as ibuprofen) before the procedure and inquire about local anesthesia.

=== Instruments ===
Several biopsy instruments are in use. The Novak curette is a thin metallic tube with a side opening at the tip; suction with an attached syringe can be applied to help remove tissue. The Pipelle is a more flexible plastic tube with a side opening at the tip. A smaller tube (internal piston) inside the Pipelle is withdrawn to create suction. Meanwhile, the pipelle is rotated and moved outwards from the fundus to the internal os to collect small pieces of endometrial tissue.

Recently, the TruTest has been introduced as an alternative method of endometrial biopsy. Rather than using a suction tube, this method uses the Tao Brush to gently brush the lining of the uterus. Generally, this method is less painful than the traditional suction method.
