= Vacuum aspiration =

Gynaecological procedure

Background
- Abortion type: Surgical
- First use: China 1958 and UK 1967
- Gestation: 3–13+6 weeks

Usage
- Figures are combined usage of MVA and EVA.
- Sweden: 42.7% (2005)
- UK: Eng. & Wales: 64% (2006)
- United States: 59.9% (2016)

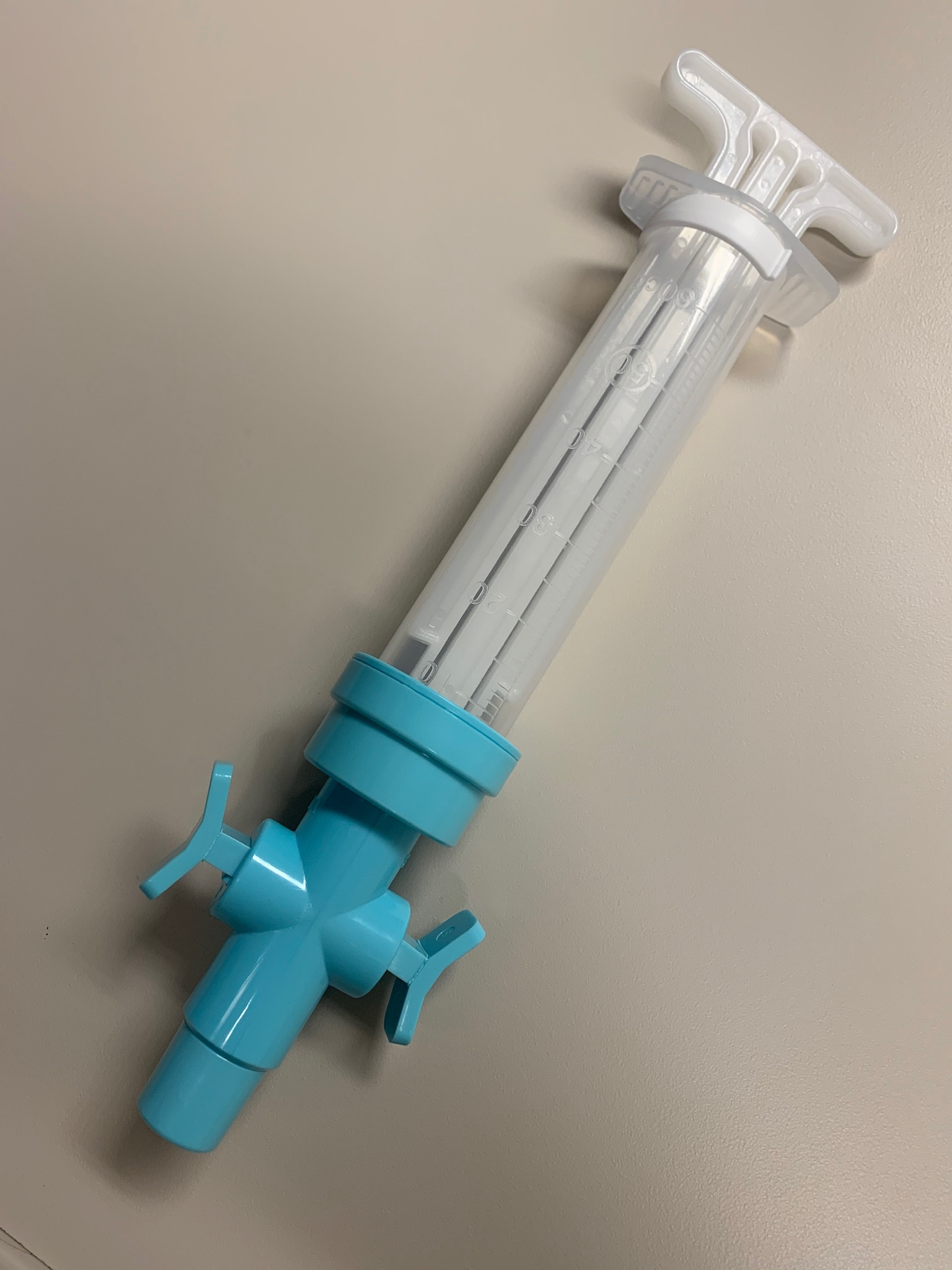
Single-use double-valve manual vacuum aspirator

Vacuum or suction aspiration is a procedure that uses a vacuum source to remove an embryo or fetus through the cervix. The procedure is performed to induce abortion, as a treatment for incomplete spontaneous abortion (otherwise commonly known as miscarriage) or retained fetal and placental tissue, or to obtain a sample of uterine lining (endometrial biopsy). It is generally safe, and serious complications rarely occur.

Some sources may use the terms dilation and evacuation or "suction" dilation and curettage to refer to vacuum aspiration, although those terms are normally used to refer to distinctly different procedures.

== History ==
Vacuuming as a means of removing the uterine contents, rather than the previous use of a hard metal curette, was pioneered in 1958 by Drs Wu Yuantai and Wu Xianzhen in China, but their paper was only translated into English on the fiftieth anniversary of the study which would ultimately pave the way for this procedure becoming exceedingly common. It is now known to be one of the safest obstetric procedures, and has saved countless women's lives.

In Canada, the method was pioneered and improved on by Henry Morgentaler, achieving a complication rate of 0.48% and no deaths in over 5,000 cases. He was the first doctor in North America to use the technique, which he then trained other doctors to use.

Dorothea Kerslake introduced the method into the United Kingdom in 1967 and published a study in the United States that further spread the technique.

Harvey Karman in the United States refined the technique in the early 1970s with the development of the Karman cannula, a soft, flexible cannula that avoided the need for initial cervical dilatation and so reduced the risks of puncturing the uterus.

== Clinical uses ==
Vacuum aspiration may be used as a method of induced abortion as well as a therapeutic procedure after spontaneous abortion. The procedure can also aid in regulation of the menstrual cycle and to obtain a sample for endometrial biopsy. A study found use of Karman vacuum aspiration to be a safer option for endometrial biopsy when compared to the alternatives such as conventional endometrial curettage. It is also used to terminate molar pregnancy.

When used as a spontaneous abortion management or as a therapeutic abortion method, vacuum aspiration may be used alone or with cervical dilation anytime in the first trimester (up to 12 weeks gestational age). For more advanced pregnancies, vacuum aspiration may be used as one step in a dilation and evacuation procedure. Vacuum aspiration is the surgical procedure used for almost all first-trimester abortions in many countries, if medication abortion is not a viable option.

== Procedure ==
A diagram of a vacuum aspiration abortion procedure at eight weeks gestation. 1: Amniotic sac 2: Embryo 3: Uterine lining 4: Speculum 5: Vacurette 6: Attached to a suction pump Figure I is before aspiration of amniotic sac and embryo, and Figure II is after aspiration with the instrument still inside the uterus.

Vacuum aspiration is an outpatient procedure that generally involves a clinic visit of several hours. The procedure itself typically takes less than 15 minutes. Depending on the state of residence and local laws, two appointments and various other proceedings may be required if the vacuum aspiration is being used for therapeutic abortion. There are two options for the source of suction in the use of these procedures. Suction can be created with either an electric pump (electric vacuum aspiration or EVA) or a manual pump (manual vacuum aspiration or MVA). A hand-held 25cc or 50cc syringe can function as a manual pump. Both of these methods can create the same level of suction, and therefore are considered equivalent in terms of efficacy of treatment and safety. The difference in use primarily comes down to provider preference.

The clinician places a speculum into the vagina in order to visualize the cervix. The cervix is cleansed, then a local anesthetic (usually lidocaine) is injected in the form of a para-cervical block or intra-cervical injection into the cervix. The clinician may use instruments called "dilators" in incrementally larger sizes to gently open the cervix, or medically induce cervical dilation with drugs or osmotic dilators administered before the procedure. Finally, a sterile cannula is inserted into the uterus. The cannula may be attached via tubing to the pump if using an electric vacuum, or attached directly to a syringe if using a manual vacuum aspirator. The pump creates a vacuum and suction which empties uterine contents, which either enter a canister or the syringe.

After a procedure for abortion or miscarriage treatment, the tissue removed from the uterus is examined for completeness to ensure that no products of conception are left behind. Expected contents include the embryo or fetus, as well as the decidua, chorionic villi, amniotic fluid, amniotic membrane and other tissues. These are all tissues which are found in a normal pregnancy. In the case of a molar pregnancy, these components will not be found.

Post-treatment care includes brief observation in a recovery area and a follow-up appointment approximately two weeks later. During these visits, it is possible that the provider may perform tests to check for infection, as retained tissue in the uterus can be a source of infection.

Additional medications used in vacuum aspiration include NSAID analgesics that may be started the day before the procedure, as well as misoprostol the day before for cervical ripening which makes dilation of the cervix easier to perform. Procedural sedation and analgesia may be offered to the patient in order to avoid discomfort.

== Advantages over sharp dilation and curettage ==
Sharp dilation and curettage (D&C), also known as sharp curettage, was once the standard of care in situations requiring uterine evacuation. However, vacuum aspiration has a number of advantages over sharp D&C and has largely replaced D&C in many settings. Manual vacuum aspiration has been found to have lower rates of incomplete evacuation and retained products of conception in the uterus. Sharp curettage has also been associated with Asherman's Syndrome, whereas vacuum aspiration has not been found to have this longer term complication. Overall, vacuum aspiration has been found to have lower rates of complications when compared to D&C.

Vacuum aspiration may be used earlier in pregnancy when compared to sharp D&C. Manual vacuum aspiration is the only surgical abortion procedure available earlier than the sixth week of pregnancy.

Vacuum aspiration, especially manual vacuum aspiration, is significantly cheaper than sharp D&C. The equipment needed for vacuum aspiration costs less than a set of surgical curettes. Additionally, sharp D&C is generally provided only by physicians, vacuum aspiration may be performed by advanced practice clinicians such as physician assistants and midwives, which greatly increases access to these services.

Manual vacuum aspiration does not require electricity and so can be provided in locations that have unreliable electrical service or none at all. Manual vacuum aspiration also has the advantage of being quiet, without the louder noise of an electric vacuum pump, which can be stressful or bothersome to patients.

== Complications ==
When used for pregnancy evacuation, vacuum aspiration is 98% effective in removing all uterine contents. One of the main complications is retained products of conception which will usually require a second aspiration procedure. This is more common when the procedure is performed very early in pregnancy, before 6 weeks gestational age.

Another complication is infection, usually caused by retained products of conception or introduction of vaginal flora (otherwise known as bacteria) into the uterus. The rate of infection is 0.5%.

Other complications occur at a rate of less than 1 per 100 procedures and include excessive blood loss, creating a hole through the cervix or uterus (perforation) that may cause injury to other internal organs. Blood clots can possibly form within the uterus and block outflow of bleeding from the uterus which can cause the uterus to be enlarged and tender.
