= Dilation and curettage =

Gynecological procedure

- D&C

Background
- Abortion type: Surgical
- First use: Late 19th century
- Gestation: 4–12 weeks

Usage
- WHO recommends only when manual vacuum aspiration is unavailable
- United States: 1.7% (2003)

Medical notes
- Undertaken under heavy sedation or general anesthesia. Risk of perforation. Day-case procedure

Dilation (or dilatation) and curettage (D&C) is a gynecological procedure that dilates (widens or opens) the cervix and surgically removes tissue or a fetus from the lining of the uterus by scraping or scooping (curettage). The procedure is used for treatment, diagnostic and therapeutic purposes.

D&C can be used to end an unwanted pregnancy or to remove the remains of a non-viable fetus. It can also be used to remove the placenta after childbirth, abortion, or miscarriage. D&C is a commonly used method for first trimester abortion or miscarriage. D&C can also be used to remove tissue from the uterus for diagnostic purposes.

D&C normally refers to a procedure involving a curette, also called sharp curettage. However, some sources use the term D&C to refer to any procedure that involves the processes of dilation and removal of uterine contents; this includes the more common suction curettage procedures of manual and electric vacuum aspiration.

== Clinical uses ==
D&Cs may be performed in pregnant and non-pregnant patients, for different clinical indications. Such examples are for early abortion, removing the remains of a non-viable pregnancy or retention of placenta from a pregnancy loss/abortion, and treatment of menopause induced anomalies with the menstrual cycle.

=== During pregnancy or postpartum ===
A D&C may be performed early in pregnancy to remove pregnancy tissue, either in the case of a non-viable pregnancy, such as a missed or incomplete miscarriage, or an undesired pregnancy, as in a surgical abortion.

Dilation and curettage has been declining as a method of abortion, due to medication-based non-invasive methods of abortion, such as misoprostol and mifepristone. Suction curettage is still the most common and preferred method to ensure complete removal of remains, as the method is a completed process used for termination of a first-trimester pregnancy. The World Health Organization recommends D&C with a sharp curette as a method of surgical abortion only when manual vacuum aspiration with a suction curette is unavailable.

For patients who have recently given birth, a D&C may be indicated to remove retained placental tissue that does not pass spontaneously or for postpartum hemorrhage.

=== Non-pregnant patients ===
D&Cs for non-pregnant patients are commonly performed in tandem with a hysteroscopy, another diagnostic procedure, for the diagnosis of gynecological conditions usually involving abnormal bleeding; during menopause or with various abnormal structures growing within the uterus to remove the excess uterine lining in women who have conditions such as polyendocrine metabolic ovarian syndrome (PMOS); to remove tissue in the uterus that may be causing abnormal uterine bleeding, such as endometrial polyps or uterine fibroids; or to diagnose the cause of post-menopausal bleeding, such as in the case of endometrial cancer.

Hysteroscopy is a valid alternative or addition to D&C for many surgical indications, from diagnosis of uterine pathology to the removal of fibroids and even retained tissue of Pregnancy. It allows direct visualization of the inside of the uterus and may allow targeted sampling and removal of tissue inside the uterus.

== Procedure ==
An illustration of a dilation and curettage

Depending on the anticipated duration and difficulty expected with the procedure, as well as the clinical indication and patient preferences, a D&C may be performed with local anesthesia, moderate sedation, deep sedation, or general anesthesia. The first step in a D&C is to place a speculum in the vagina so as to see the cervix. Often, a tenaculum is placed to steady the cervix. Next, the provider will dilate the cervix. This can be done with Hegar or similar dilators. The amount of dilation depends on the amount of tissue to be removed as well as the size of the instruments to be used. After sufficient dilation, a curette, a metal rod with a handle on one end and a loop on the other, is then inserted into the uterus through the dilated cervix. The curette is used to gently scrape the lining of the uterus and remove the tissue in the uterus. If a suction curette is used, as in a vacuum aspiration, a plastic tubular curette will be introduced into the uterus and connected to suction to remove all tissue in the uterus. This tissue is examined for completeness (in the case of abortion or miscarriage treatment) or by pathology for abnormalities (in the case of treatment for abnormal bleeding).

== Complications ==
The most common complications associated with D&C are infection, bleeding, or damage to nearby organs, including through uterine perforation. Aside from the surgery itself, complications related to anesthesia administration may also occur.

Infection is uncommon after D&C for a non-pregnant patient, and society practice guidelines do not recommend routine prophylactic antibiotics to patients. However, for curettage of a pregnant patient, the risk of infection is higher, and patients should receive antibiotics that cover the bacteria commonly found in the vagina and gastrointestinal tract; doxycycline is a common recommendation, though azithromycin may also be used.

Another risk of D&C is uterine perforation. The highest rate of uterine perforation appears to be in the setting of postpartum hemorrhage (5.1%) compared with a lower rate in diagnostic curettage in non-pregnant patients (0.3% in the premenopausal patient and 2.6% in the postmenopausal patient). Perforation may cause excessive bleeding or damage to organs outside the uterus. If the provider is concerned about ongoing bleeding or the possibility of injury to organs outside the uterus, a laparoscopy may be done to verify that there has been no undiagnosed injury.

Another potential risk is Asherman's syndrome, a condition where intrauterine adhesions lead to subfertility, amenorrhea, or recurrent pregnancy loss. Although older studies described a high (25-30%) risk of developing this condition after dilation and curettage for treatment of miscarriage, these procedures were likely done using sharp curettage, which is no longer routinely performed in modern miscarriage and abortion care. Newer studies reflect the common technique of suction curettage and demonstrate a much lower risk of Asherman's syndrome, with incidence in large prospective trials ranging from 0.7 to 1.6%. A history of multiple (>3) procedures and sharp curettage were identified as risk factors for developing clinical Asherman's syndrome. A systematic review in 2013 concluded that recurrent miscarriage treated with D&C is the main risk factors for intrauterine adhesions. There are currently no studies linking asymptomatic intrauterine adhesions and long-term reproductive outcomes, and similar pregnancy outcomes have been found after miscarriage regardless of whether surgical treatment, medication management, or conservative management (i.e. watchful waiting) was chosen.

== See also ==
- Dilation and evacuation
- Menstrual extraction
- Vacuum aspiration
