= Forrest Turner =

Forrest T. Turner (February 8, 1915 – January 5, 2001) was an American bootlegger and rum-runner who gained notoriety for multiple escapes from prison in the 1930s and 1940s. Georgia Governor Ellis Arnall gave him a full pardon with the understanding that he would speak out against crime and in favor of prison reform. From that time until his death, he gave more than 10,000 speeches to church and school groups about prison reform. He earned his living making dentures, a trade he had learned in prison.

== Prison years ==
Turner was born in McDonough, Georgia. When he was 19, he was supporting his widowed mother and younger brothers and sisters by working as a "soda jerk" in McDonough, when, according to the story he told, he accepted an invitation to ride with a friend. He said that he didn't know the automobile was stolen, but when the police stopped the car, Turner was arrested.

The court-appointed attorney advised a "guilty" plea in the hope that, since it was Turner's first offense, he would likely be sentenced to probation. Instead, the judge sentenced him to four or five years in jail. When the sentence was given, Turner responded by knocking down the bailiff and running away. He was caught when he fell into an open coal pit, and when brought back to court, he was sentenced to the chain gang.

In his first of nine escapes, Turner used a razor blade and black shoe polish to make a fake pistol out of orange crate wood. Another time, after he escaped, he came back, posing as an attorney, and led the entire population of inmates in a mass escape.

In 1938, the State of Georgia dedicated Tattnal Prison in Reidsville, an "escape-proof" facility, and placed Turner there. Turner spent months using automobile valve-grinding compound and piano wire to cut through the bars of his cell. Once out, he released two other prisoners, and the three of them took over the prison switchboard, from which they sent guards to various locations in the prison, ambushed them, and tied them up. Finally, they took a truck and left with 43 prisoners. When he was recaptured, his combined sentences totaled 125 years. He was assigned to the "eight-ball squad," prisoners who performed hard labor while chained to iron balls.

Then, a new director of the State Department of Corrections, Wiley L. Moore, abolished the "eight-ball squad," and offered Turner a prison job in the dental laboratory. In 1946, Turner was transferred from the state system to the Fulton County Prison, where he became assistant to Chaplain Bill Allison. The publicity surrounding Turner led the parole board and the governor to reexamine his case, determining that he had never committed a serious crime, if any crime. In March, 1949, Georgia Governor Ellis Arnall commuted his sentence, and he was released.

== Life as a community citizen ==
Turner opened a dental laboratory business in Jonesboro (Clayton County), Georgia, and gained a reputation for providing dentures free or "at cost" for people who could not afford them.

He also signed personal custody for "hundreds of parolees, of whom only a handful had to go back to jail."

When a detective who had arrested him several times died, Turner served as a pallbearer.

In 1970, Turner was arrested for practicing dentistry without a license, and the case concluded in January 1971 with a guilty verdict, fining him $500., and restricting him from doing dental work for a year. Later, Turner gave his explanation of the case to a friendly newspaper columnist. Regarding the license issue, he told the columnist that he, himself, had advocated licensing of dental laboratories "so old people and poor people can get their false teeth made less expensively," but because of his advocacy, dentists were "out to get him." He was arrested after had made teeth for a man who turned out to be a Georgia Bureau of Investigation informant. There were also claims that investigators had found drugs. Regarding this, he told the columnist, "It's been embarrassing. One of the papers said I was arrested with some drugs. It was some old Novocain that came in a dentist's bag a friend gave me some time ago. But it sounded like I was a pusher or something, and I've felt bad because I do a lot of work with young kids and I keep expecting one of them to come up with something like, 'Daddy-o, what are you on?'"

Turner ran two times for the office of representative in the Georgia legislature. He lost both times.

He died in Snellville, Georgia, on January 5, 2001, and state notables, including former Governor Lester Maddox, attended his funeral.
