= Carol Downer =

American feminist lawyer and non-fiction author (1933–2025)

- Born: Carollynn Aurilla Chatham; October 9, 1933; Shawnee, Oklahoma, U.S.
- Died: January 13, 2025 (aged 91); Glendale, California, U.S.
- Occupations: Immigration Lawyer, Author, Activist, Board of Directors of the Feminist Women's Health Centers of California
- Years active: 40+ years
- Spouse(s): Earle Wallace Brown (divorced) Frank Downer (m. 1965; died 2012)
- Awards: Christopher Tietze Humanitarian Award in 1998, Wiley W. Manuel Award in 1994,
- Website: WomensHealthInWomensHands

Carollynn Aurilla Downer (née Chatham; October 9, 1933 – January 13, 2025) was an American feminist lawyer and non-fiction author who focused her career on abortion rights and women's health around the world. She was involved in the creation of the self-help movement and the first self-help clinic in LA, which later became a model and inspiration for dozens of self-help clinics across the United States.

== Background ==
Downer was born in 1933 in Shawnee, Oklahoma, but was raised in Los Angeles, where she started her local political movements in East Los Angeles in the 1960s. She was not active in the women's movement until 1963, when she had her first abortion after separating from her first husband, who was the father of her four children. She was inspired after watching a protest on the television held at the University of California, Los Angeles, about the lack of birth control services offered on the campus. After going through her experience with the painful abortion, in the early 1970s Downer began her quest to making abortions safer for other women.

In 1969, she joined the LA Chapter of NOW's Abortion Committee to learn about abortion and its history from Lana Phelan. This is where she met Harvey Karman. In 1970, many members of the LA feminist community supported Karman and his colleague, John Gwynn. Together they opened an illegal abortion clinic, the one in which Downer would refer women seeking abortion to. Downer soon began to feel dissatisfaction with the atmosphere of Karman and Gwynn's clinic. Karman eventually agreed to let Downer observe his abortion method at the clinic, but Downer was always careful to say that Karman did not actually teach her how to do the abortions - he only allowed her to observe him perform it. Shortly after, Downer introduced menstrual extraction to other activists.

== Life and career ==
Downer began her activist career in the movement for civil rights and local politics in California during the 1960s. She became active in the women's liberation movement in 1969, and she worked to try to make abortion available in Los Angeles, California under the liberalized abortion law. Downer began her work in the women's health movement on the Abortion Task Force of NOW with Lana Clarke Phelan, author of The Abortion Handbook, who became her mentor. Downer and other women observed abortion procedures at Harvey Karman's illegal abortion clinic on Santa Monica Boulevard in West Los Angeles to learn how to perform abortions themselves. While there, she took a vaginal speculum and figured out how to do a vaginal self-examination. After Downer and others formed the Los Angeles Abortion Task Force, they called a meeting on April 7, 1971 at a feminist book store to educate women about abortion and their bodies. Downer demonstrated the vaginal self-examination to the estimated two dozen women who attended. Downer's group founded the Women's Abortion Referral Service, the first of its kind to offer pregnancy screening. "Women came from all over for help", Downer said.

The result of this first meeting of the Self-Help Clinic was the development of the concept of menstrual extraction and the invention of the Del-Em kit by Lorraine Rothman. This provided women with a less traumatic abortion option than the use of a metal tool to scrape the inside of the uterus, which was predominately used at the time. Downer and Rothman travelled across the country and many Self-Help Clinics were formed. During this time, abortion, birth control and fertility information were not widely available to women. The menstrual extraction and vaginal self examinations that Downer pioneered with her team provided women with the means to learn about their bodies and take control of their reproduction. Barbara Ehrenreich described Downer and Rothman's efforts as "legitimizing the notion that we have the right to know and decide about procedures...that affect our bodies and our lives." In 1972 she also gave a notable speech to the American Psychological Association on September 5, 1972, in Hawaii, entitled "Covert Sex Discrimination Against Women as Medical Patients."

She and Rothman were leaders of a group that founded the Feminist Women's Health Center in Los Angeles in 1971. Equipped with vaginal speculums, they traveled the United States to share their information with women around the country. Downer and Rothman also promoted group meetings where they taught women how to self-administer cervical exams and provided them with information on a procedure called menstrual extraction. Downer and Rothman trained women how to suction out menstrual material on or near the time of the menstrual period; if the woman is pregnant, this constitutes a non-professional abortion. When they came back from their trip around the US, Downer and her followers started a women's abortion referral service at their own clinic. In 1972, the police conducted a search of Downer's clinic/health center and arrested her and Colleen Wilson for practicing medicine without a proper license. Called the Great Yogurt Conspiracy, they were using yogurt inter-vaginally to treat a woman's yeast infection. Downer was later acquitted of all charges.

Within 50 days of the Roe v. Wade Supreme Court decision, which ruled that women have a right to end their pregnancy, her group opened the Women's Choice Clinic in Los Angeles and Orange County. Over the next two years, other Feminist Women's Health Centers were established, forming part of the Federation of Feminist Women's Health Center in 1975.

From 1987 to 1991, Downer attended law school and worked for the Federation of FWHCs. Since then, she has practiced law, mostly in the area of disability rights. In 1981, she was the general editor of A New View of a Woman's Body, published by Simon and Schuster, and she was an editor of a companion book, How to Stay Out of the Gynecologist's Office, published by Women to Women Publication. In 1984, she and Francie Hornstein assisted Ginny Cassidy-Brinn, a Registered Nurse, in writing Woman-Centered Pregnancy and Birth, published by Cleis Press. But during the Reagan Administration, the anti-abortion movement grew, and the clinics were hit with protests. "The low point was 1985, when the clinic burned down, but we didn’t give up," Downer said. Many believe the fire was started by protesters. So these women began mobile clinics located in vans, which did screenings in a safe and secure location.

In 1992, she wrote A Woman's Book of Choices with Rebecca Chalker, published by Seven Stories Press. She has also served on the board of directors of the National Abortion Federation. Downer's book included instructions on how to practice early abortions more safely. The procedure requires the assistance of at least two experts. The book does not only tell readers to do abortions on their own, but it gives advice about when a woman should go to a medical practitioner to terminate early pregnancy.

Downer was promoting women's liberation, giving speaking presentations, and working on her next book in which she advances the belief that women's collective efforts to achieve their sexual and reproductive liberation is a fundamental strategy for social change. She was also working on the board of directors of the Feminist Women's Health Centers of California. This board operates eight Women's Health Specialist Clinics. She recently posted a video on YouTube about the history of her foundation and how she taught other women about the speculum abortion technique. She was also an immigration lawyer in the Los Angeles area.

Downer died on January 13, 2025, at a hospital in Glendale, California, after a heart attack two weeks prior. She was 91.

== Self-help movement ==
The self-help movement started with the formation of self-help groups across the United States as a reaction to the experiences women had with gynecologists in the 1950s and 1960s. It a structural response to the absolute authority of doctors, the objectification of women's bodies in health care, and the increasing dehumanization of the practice and field of medicine. The women in these groups believed that women and their bodily experiences were the best knowledge holders of women's bodies. That was their central epistemological principle. Downer was one of the so-called "self-helpers."

=== Self-help gynecology ===
Self-Help gynecology was the basis of the movement's critique of the mystification of women's bodies and the monopoly of knowledge held by doctors. It was a consciousness-raising technique and involved the conceptualization of health and illness in a fundamentally different manner than the manner common at the time. Self-help gynecology was conceptualized as an ongoing, routine health care process. This had the effect of eliminating and/or minimizing the distinction between medical providers and experts, and the receivers and lay persons.

Downer and the practice of self-help gynecology had many critics, including those from within feminism. Some feminists felt shocked and offended at Downer and Rothman's self-examination presentations. Other feminists worried this practice would take attention away from the other efforts of the women's health movement, such as legislative and judicial reform. Some were concerned that the self-help groups themselves were merely an outlet for women to air their grievances of mainstream medical institutions and did not involve any real change. There were also those who worried that self-help gynecology would lead to an overreliance on it and would cause women to neglecting to visit their physician when experiencing serious conditions. To this, activists argued that self-help gynecology could be used in conjunction with mainstream medicine.

=== Significance to feminism ===
Some scholars, such as Hannah Grace Dudley Shotwell, argue that self-help activists revolutionized women's healthcare by way of creating an entire system of alternative healthcare options. The movement gave activists the opportunity to gain "body-knowledge," which was self-representations of their own embodied experience. Activists were able to reconstruct negative cultural message of women's reproductive bodies, especially messages of female genitals and fluids that reinforced traditional sex roles. By understanding their own bodies through observation and the sharing of their bodily experiences, self-help activists, like Downer, combatted negative perceptions.

== Self-Help Clinic One ==
In 1971, Carol Downer and Lorraine Rothman founded "Self-Help Clinic One" in Los Angeles. Downer and Rothman came up with the idea at the Everywoman's Bookstore, where women interested medical self-help met. During one meeting, Downer demonstrated self-examination technique by lifting her skirt, inserting a speculum into her vagina, and showing her cervix to the women at the meeting.

The clinic began in a back room in the Women's Center on South Crenshaw Boulevard and later, the clinic moved to a house in the same area so as to remain accessible to women who needed its services. Downer explained that the clinic's main goal was to "take women's medicine back into our own hands. The strategy [was] to take back the power over power over our own bodies, both everyday types of control which information and self-knowledge gives [sic] us, and we also want to acquire special skills and knowledge which will allow us collectively to independently provide our own health care." The center eventually became a symbol of the struggle to legalize abortion and had an active part in the public dialogue about reproductive rights.

The first clinic served as a blueprint for other self-help clinics established in other parts of California, Oregon, Washington, Florida, and Georgia. These centers led to the foundation of a decentralized coalition called the "Federation of Feminist Women's Health Centers" (FWHC). Within the coalition, they shared materials, wrote books, and met as a group to share ideas, education and provide support for each other .

=== Principles ===
Before the 1970s, a woman's gynecologist knew more about her body than she did. Downer wanted to change that, giving women the chance to see, understand, and take responsibility for their reproductive health, by making women aware of their rights as health care consumers. As such, Self-Help Clinic One and others like it, were more than just clinics - they were also political organizations.

Although controversial among feminists, Downer believed in the concept of organizational structure. Running a clinic required a bureaucracy, but to avoid the typical bureaucratic pitfalls of regular health centers, Downer and Rothman's clinic had an open structure that invited the maximum participation when making clinic policy. She wanted to make the structure of the clinic work for the staff and patients - not the other way around, and so, the clinic had collective control over the workplace and had no outside board of directors or separate management structure.

Downer wanted to ensure the most comfortable and supportive environment possible - different from the bare environment at typical medical facilities run mainly by men. The environment in the clinic itself had decorations on the walls, colorful rugs and plants, providing a relaxed atmosphere, with comfortable chairs arranged in a circle to facilitate conversations. On the ceiling above the examination table, there was a picture of a pretty landscape to help create a calming atmosphere for the women during procedures.

Downer and Rothman wanted to avoid the layout of traditional abortion clinics where the patient followed a standardized route into and through the clinic. Instead, patients sat at different stations with one another, giving them the opportunity to talk to each other. In addition, each woman was accompanied throughout her visit by a lay counselor so they were never alone. After the procedure, women returned to the waiting room so others could see that she was fine. This created a loop of peer support among patients during their time at the clinic, encouraging women to ask questions, see how other women were doing, and support one another.

=== Services ===
Self-Help Clinic One and other feminist women's health centers like it, offered a variety of reproductive health services. Within two weeks of the Roe v. Wade decision, the Women's Choice Clinic opened and they began offering abortions. Doctors could perform therapeutic abortions up to ten weeks after conception. The staff counseled the women before and after the abortion, and accompanied them into the procedure room to help walk them through the process and to offer emotional support. In addition to this, clinics offered free pregnancy screening, information on birth control, and education about how to properly use birth control methods. Due to the extreme legal vulnerability of abortion access, the staff were careful to follow the letter of the law. Abortion procedures were always done by medical doctors accompanied by two laywomen counselor/health workers.

Clinics also provided "well-woman" gynecology care and education, where women learned how to perform vaginal self-examinations and/or other basic gynecological self-help procedures in a group or one-on-one setting. Although clinic workers had varying levels of formal medical education, and some were entirely clinic trained, all exams and tests were supervised by a staff doctor. This allowed women to have some unique choices for their gynecological care. Women who needed routine medical exams were able to choose whether they saw a gynecologist or a layperson supervised by a doctor, would educate them in self-exam and staying healthy. Another option was to have a group appointment scheduled with several other women and, in addition to being treated by a doctor, they could also watch and learn from the examination and treatment of other women.

== The Great Yogurt Conspiracy ==
In September 1972, police raided Self-Help Clinic one. One doctor, three uniformed policemen and several plainclothes investigators conducted what was later described as a "gynecological treasure hunt". During their raid, they confiscated four trunk-loads of files, books, clothes, furniture, medical supplies, and medical equipment. They seized a fifty-foot extension cord, a plastic specula, syringes and tubes, different forms of birth control (i.e., IUDs, birth control pills, and diaphragms), Del-Ems, a pie tin, a measuring cup, and a carton of strawberry yogurt. The FWHC issued a press release that conveyed the absurdity of the raid. The press release reported the raid and noted that "police also attempted to confiscate a carton of strawberry yogurt, but were deterred by the strenuous objectives of one of the center staff members, who stated 'you can't have that; it's my breakfast!'" This led the feminist community to begin to refer to the raid as "The Great Yogurt Conspiracy." the clinic later learned that they have been under surveillance for the past six months.

=== Arrest and trial ===
Carol Downer and a staff member, Colleen Wilson, were arrested on the grounds of practicing medicine without a license. The police charged Wilson for giving out birth control pills, hypodermic needles, pregnancy tests, for drawing blood, and for aiding women in fitting diaphragms. She pled guilty to one count of practicing medicine without a license as she had aiding a woman in fitting a diaphragm. She was fined $250 and sentenced to two years probation. Downer protested the punishment and is quoted with stating that "fitting a diaphragm was just like fitting a shoe."

Downer was also charged with practicing medicine without a license - she had helped activist Z. Budapest put yogurt into her vagina (a common home remedy for yeast infections at the time), and for showing a woman how to do a self-cervical exam. LA Deputy City Attorney David M. Schacter was convinced that the staff members at the clinic had been practicing medicine and insisted that all the procedures should have been performed by a qualified doctor. He is quoted with demanding: "Who are they to diagnose a yeast infection and prescribe yogurt for it?" To the women at the clinic, Schacter's attitude hinted towards men's monopolistic control of women. Downer pleaded not guilty and went to trial.

Downer's main defense for the trial was that the law that forbade laypeople from diagnosing and treating others was too vague. She argued that "if the state truly did enforce this law, a person could not pass a sneezing friend a tissue or bring over chicken soup for a cold." She even asked a doctor involved in her trial if a mother diagnosing her child's illness would qualify as practicing medicine without a license, to which he replied: "Well, we can't do anything about that." Her feminist attorneys, Diane Wayne and Jeanette Christy, requested and received a woman judge for the trial, which was a major accomplishment given the scarcity of women judges at the time. Downer closed her appeal with the quote: "This trial is a direct threat to our rights to know our own bodies. We not only expect to win, but we also want to give emphatic notice to all who would deny us this right as we will control our own bodies."

=== The public's reaction ===
Men and women around the nation rallied together to support Downer. This had the effect of disseminating more information on self-help across the nation. Women from all over called and wrote to Downer and the FWHC to offer their encouragement. Many people also sent money for the defense. Several well-known personalities, such as Gloria Steinem, Robin Morgan, and Dr. Benjamin Spock, publicly declared their support. Congresswoman Bella Abzug is reported to have stated that "the trial was nothing less than a test case to determine whether women were allowed to examine their own bodies." Feminist anthropologist Margaret Mead is reported in the LA Times to have stated: "Men began taking over obstetrics, and they invented a tool... to look inside women. You would call this progress, except that women tried to look inside themselves, this was called practicing medicine without a license."

=== Verdict ===
The LAPD raided the clinic based on information given from two undercover witnesses: an ex-nun who had attended the session where the yogurt incident occurred, and a policewoman, Sharon Dalton, who was the main witness and who stated that Downer had offered to perform an abortion for her. Downer had not even been at the clinic on the date that Dalton claimed they spoke, having flown to Portland, Oregon that day to conduct a workshop at an American Psychological Association conference.

Nine hours of deliberation later, a jury made up of three black women, one white woman and eight white men acquitted Downer of all charges. Her attorneys successfully argued that the law was too vague and if it was truly followed, Downer and others would not have even been able to discuss a cold with a friend or "offer her a tissue." They went even further to point out that "half of the mothers in the county could be charged with diagnosing that their children had the measles."

=== Impact ===
The most significant impact that "The Great Yogurt Conspiracy" and trial had was that it brought national attention to the concept of self-examination. Both large and small newspapers covered the event, including Times Magazine, Newsweek, and the New York Times. After the trial, many self-help activists saw a significant increase in demand for plastic speculums and received more requests for self-help presentations. The trial was seen as a "great victory for self-help and for women taking control of their bodies."

The case and trial set the precedent for other self-help clinics to operate legally. It revealed to the public how far authorities would go to eliminate the threat of self-help clinics - clinics which gave women control of their own health. Had Downer been convicted, it would have been a serious setback to the women's health movement.

== Awards ==
Throughout Carol Downer's career, she has received multiple awards, such as:

- Outstanding Women Edition of Life Magazine in 1976.
- Women's Caucus of American Health Association in 1989
- Wiley W. Manuel Award in 1994
- Ms. Magazine in 1996
- National Abortion Federation's, Christopher Tietze Humanitarian Award in 1998.

=== Bibliography ===
- Women's Health The Virtual Oral Aural History Archive V O A H A at C S U L B Feminist Health Movement
