= Products of conception =

Tissue resulting in the union between egg and sperm

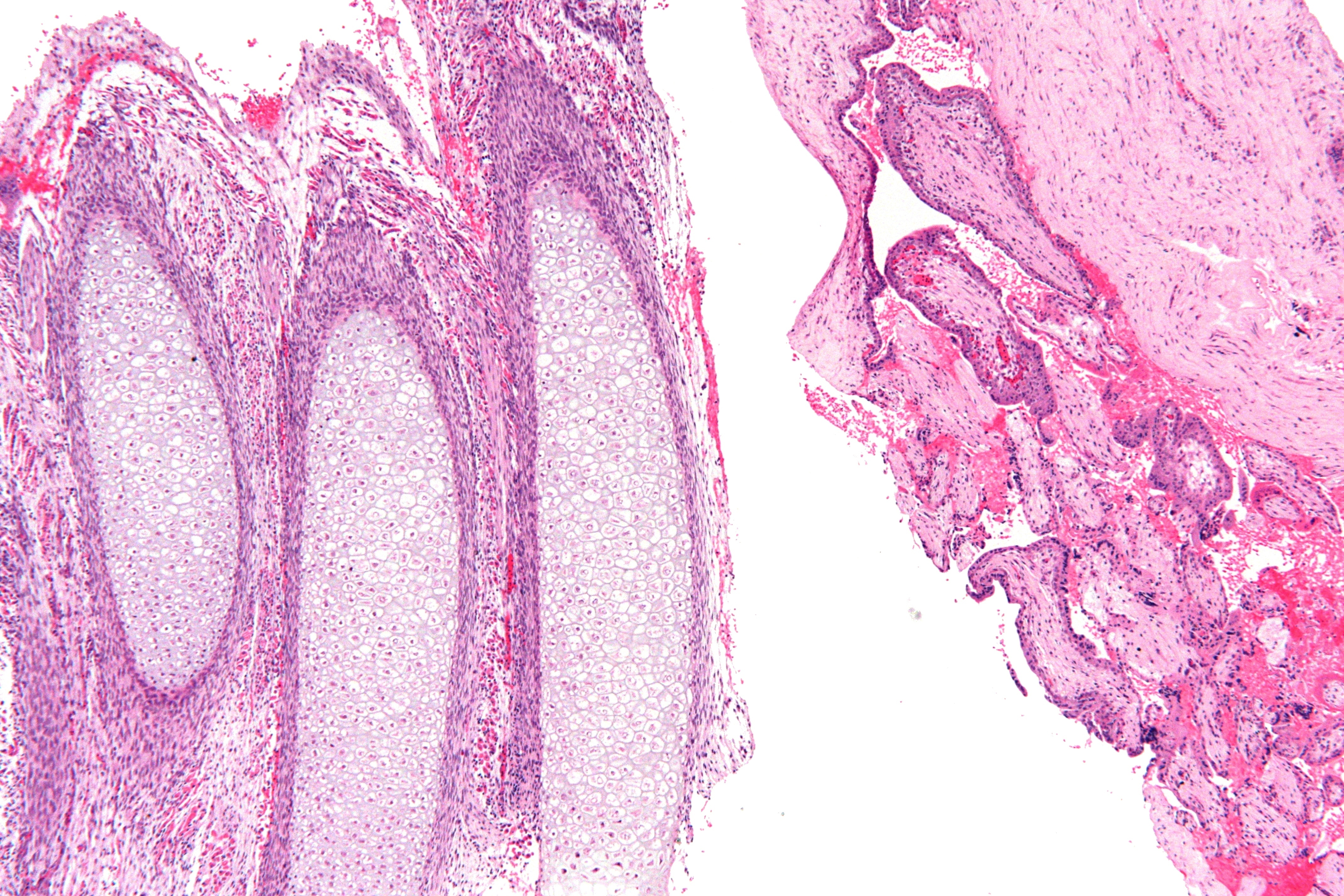
Micrograph of products of conception. Chorionic villi (right of image) and cartilage, i.e. fetal parts (left of image). H&E stain.

Products of conception, abbreviated POC, is a medical term used for the tissue derived from the union of an egg and a sperm. It encompasses anembryonic gestation (blighted ovum) which does not have a viable embryo.

In the context of tissue from a dilation and curettage, the presence of POC essentially excludes an ectopic pregnancy.

== Retained products of conception ==
Retained products of conception is where products of conception remain in the uterus after childbirth, medical abortion or miscarriage (also known as spontaneous abortion). Miscarriage with retained products of conception is termed delayed when no or very little products of conception have been passed, and incomplete when some products have been passed but some still remain in utero.

== Diagnosis ==
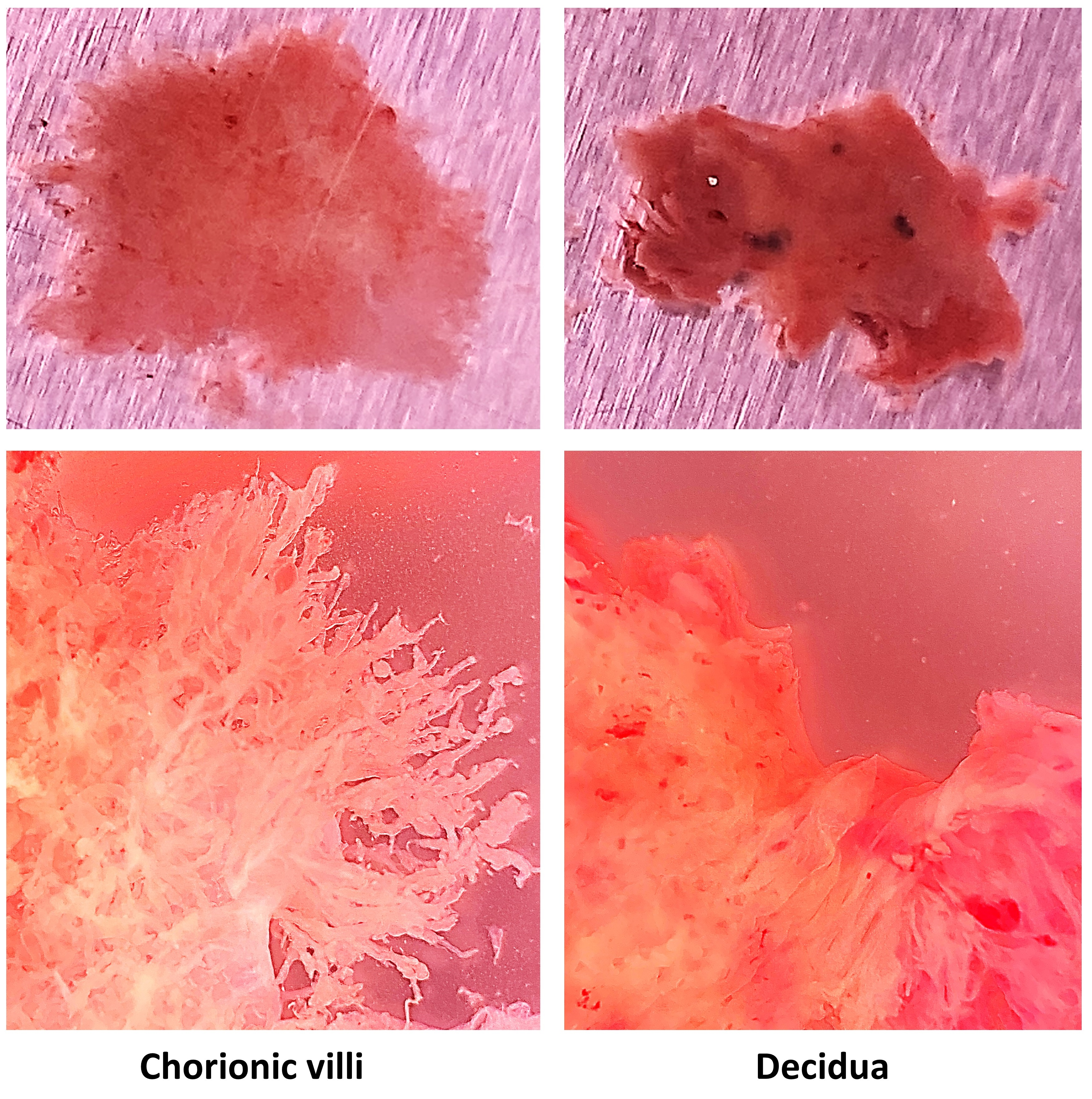
On gross pathology, the presence of chorionic villi (left) is diagnostic of products of conception, whereas decidua (right) is not.

The diagnosis is based on clinical presentation, quantitative HCG, ultrasound, and pathologic evaluation. A solid, heterogeneous, echogenic mass has a positive predictive value of 80%, but is present in only a minority of cases. A thickened endometrium of > 10 mm is usually considered abnormal, though no consensus exists on the appropriate cutoff. A cut-off of 8 mm or more has 34% positive rate, while a cut off of 14 mm or more has 85% sensitivity, 64% specificity for the diagnosis. Color Doppler flow in the endometrial canal can increased confidence in the diagnosis, though its absence does not exclude it, as 40% of cases of retained products have little or no flow. The differential in suspected cases includes uterine atony, blood clot, gestational trophoblastic disease, and normal post partum appearance of the uterus. Post partum blood clot is more common, reported in up to 24% of postpartum patients, and tends to be more hypoechoic than retained products with absent color flow on Doppler, and resolving spontaneously on follow up scans. The presence of gas raises the possibility of post partum endometritis, though this can also be seen in up to 21% of normal post pregnancy states. The normal post partum uterus is usually less than 2 cm in thickness, and continues to involute on follow up scans to 7 mm or less over time. Retained products are not uncommon, occurring in approximately 1% of all pregnancies, though it more common following abortions, either elective or spontaneous. There is significant overlap between appearance of a normal post partum uterus and retained products. If there is no endometrial canal mass or fluid, and endometrial thickness is less than 10 mm and without increased flow, retained products are statistically unlikely.

=== Infections ===
Recent studies indicate that the products of conception may be susceptible to pathogenic infections, including viral infections. Indeed, footprints of JC polyomavirus and Merkel cell polyomavirus have been detected in chorionic villi from females affected by spontaneous abortion as well as pregnant women. Another virus, BK polyomavirus has been detected in the same tissues, but with lesser extent.

== Treatment ==
=== After medical abortion ===
According to the 2006 WHO Frequently asked clinical questions about medical abortion, the presence of remaining products of conception in the uterus (as detected by obstetric ultrasonography) after a medical abortion is not an indication for surgical intervention (that is, vacuum aspiration or dilation and curettage). Remaining products of conception will be expelled during subsequent vaginal bleeding. Still, surgical intervention may be carried out on the woman's request, if the bleeding is heavy or prolonged, or causes anemia, or if there is evidence of endometritis.

=== In delayed miscarriage ===
In delayed miscarriage (also called missed abortion), the Royal Women's Hospital recommendations of management depend on the findings in ultrasonography:

- Gestational sac greater than 30-35mm, embryo larger than ~25mm (corresponding to 9+0 weeks of gestational age): Surgery is recommended. It poses a high risk of pain and bleeding with passage of products of conception. Alternative methods may still be considered.
- Gestational sac 15-35mm, embryo smaller than 25mm (corresponding to between 7 and 9+0 weeks of gestational age): Medication is recommended. Surgery or expectant management may be considered.
- Gestational sac smaller than 15-20mm, corresponding to a gestational age of less than 7 weeks: Expectant management or medication is preferable. The products of conception may be difficult to find surgically with a considerable risk of failed surgical procedure.

=== In incomplete miscarriage ===
In incomplete miscarriage, the Royal Women's Hospital recommendations of management depend on the findings in ultrasonography:

- Retained products of conception smaller than 15mm: Expectant management is generally preferable. There is a high chance of spontaneous expulsion.
- Retained products of conception measuring between 15 and 20mm: Medical or expectant management are recommended. Surgery should only be considered upon specific indication.
- At retained products of conception measuring over 35 to 50mm, the following measures are recommended:

- Administration of misoprostol to hasten passage of products of conception.
- Admission to inpatient care for observation for a few hours or overnight until the majority of the products of conception has passed and bleeding subsided.
- After apparent failure of misoprostol, a gynecologic examination should be done prior to considering surgical evacuation of the uterus or the patient leaving the hospital.

== See also ==
- Abortion
