= Lorraine Rothman =

American activist

- Born: Evelyn Lorraine Fleishman; January 12, 1932; San Francisco, California, US
- Died: September 25, 2007 (aged 75); Fullerton, California, US
- Education: California State University, Los Angeles
- Known for: Menstrual extraction

Evelyn Lorraine Rothman (January 12, 1932 – September 25, 2007) was an American activist. She was a founding member of the feminist self-help clinic movement. In 1971, she invented the Del-Em menstrual extraction kit to make abortions available to women before Roe v. Wade. She was an advocate of self-induced abortions.

== Early life ==
Lorraine Rothman was born Evelyn Lorraine Fleishman in San Francisco, California in 1932 into a traditional Orthodox Jewish family and attended Hebrew school during her younger years. While working full-time, she attended Los Angeles City College and California State University Los Angeles, where she received a B.A. and teaching credential in 1954. After marrying in 1954, she moved to Baltimore with her husband, Al Rothman, and taught in the Baltimore City Public School System. She returned to California with her husband and children in 1964 and resumed public school teaching.

== Social activism ==
In 1968, Rothman first joined a local women's liberation group that she met at California State University Fullerton. She subsequently became a founding member of the Orange County chapter of NOW. Rothman's collaborative relationship with Carol Downer and the Self-Help Clinic movement began when she attended a meeting in 1971, which was organized by Downer to discuss women's reproductive rights and abortion. In the weeks before the meeting, Downer and a few other women visited Harvey Karman's illegal abortion clinic on Santa Monica Boulevard in West Los Angeles to learn how Karman performed abortions. Rothman volunteered to adapt Karman's manual vacuum aspiration equipment for home use.

A week after her first meeting with Downer, Rothman demonstrated the prototype of the Del-Em menstrual extraction kit for their group. The Del-Em kit allowed women to perform self-examinations and early abortions without having to visit a doctor since at the time of its creation abortions were not legal. In 1972, Downer and Rothman founded the first Feminist Women's Health Center (FWHC) in Los Angeles. She later co-founded the second FWHC in Santa Ana, California.

At the FWHC in Los Angeles, the main priority was increasing women's awareness of their bodies and providing a sense of security. Cervical and vaginal self-exams were demonstrated at the clinic so that women could perform these at home. This meant they could avoid going to a doctor's office to secure mandatory approval. In addition to cervical and vaginal self-exams, a demonstration of the at-home pregnancy test was introduced. Along with the tests that were taught at the clinic, there was an outreach for a patient advocacy program. Through it, patients could receive outpatient suction abortions. Approximately 60% of all surgical interventions are done in outpatient settings.

In 1999, Rothman co-authored a book with Marcia Wexler called Menopause Myths and Facts: What Every Woman Should Know About Hormone Replacement Therapy, which was critical of hormone replacement therapy (HRT). Of HRT she said, "Hormone Replacement Therapy is a misnomer: they are not hormones (they are drugs made synthetically in the laboratory), they are not replacing anything (our bodies continue to make enough hormones during and after menopause), and they are not therapeutic (menopause is not a disease)."

== Death ==
Rothman died of bladder cancer on September 25, 2007, in Fullerton, California.

== Legacy ==
According to the book titled Into Our Own Hands, "Lorraine Rothman developed a menstrual extraction kit that she called the Del-Em, which gave women unprecedented control over their monthly periods." Rothman wanted to make sure women were aware and educated about the control they had over their own bodies. In light of Rothman's opening of the "Los Angeles Feminist Women's Health Center" women all over the world have been educated and empowered to take control of their bodies and sense of self-worth.
