= Menstrual extraction =

Vacuum aspiration technique

Background
- Abortion type: Surgical
- First use: 1971
- Gestation: First trimester

Usage
- Developed and used in a feminist, non-medicalized context.

Menstrual extraction (ME) is a type of manual vacuum aspiration technique developed by feminist activists Lorraine Rothman and Carol Downer to pass the entire menses at once. The non-medicalized technique has been used in small feminist self-help groups since 1971 and has a social role of allowing access to early abortion without needing medical assistance or legal approval. ME usage declined after 1973, when Roe v. Wade legalized abortion in the United States. There has been renewed interest in the technique, in the 1990s and more recently in the 2010s, due to increased restrictions on abortion. In some countries where abortion is illegal, such as Bangladesh, the terms "menstrual regulation" or "menstrual extraction" are used as euphemisms for early pregnancy terminations.

== Development within a feminist context ==
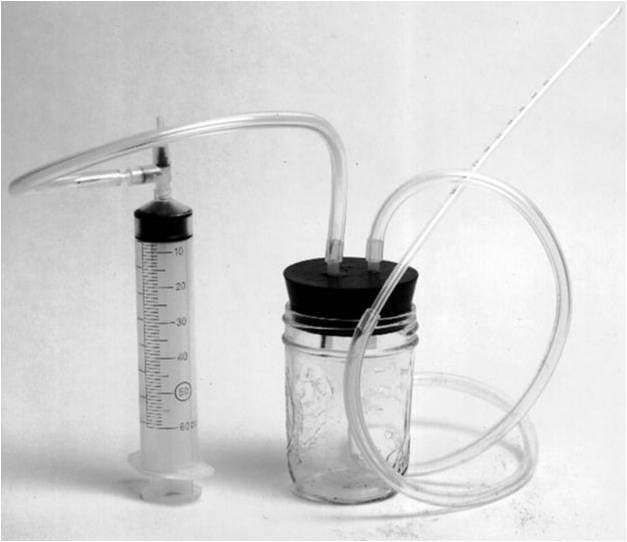
The Del Em

In 1971, Lorraine Rothman and Carol Downer, members of a feminist reproductive health self-help group, modified equipment found in an underground abortion clinic that was developed for a new non-traumatic, manually-operated-suction abortion technique. They took the thin, flexible plastic Karman cannula (about the size of a soda straw), and the syringe (50 or 60ml), and added a one-way bypass valve, to fix two main problems. The contraption could prevent air from being pumped into the uterus, and also suctioned uterine contents directly into the syringe, thus limiting the amount that could be removed. They added two lengths of clear plastic tubing, one from the cannula to the collection jar and another to go from the collection jar to the syringe. With this new setup, the contents of the uterus went directly into the jar, allowing for the extraction of more material, and the two-way bypass valve diverted any air that may have been inadvertently pushed back toward the body to exit harmlessly into the air; this would prevent air from entering the uterus. Rothman and Downer dubbed the new invention the "Del Em". By making it possible for more than one person to operate the device, the skill level required of the operators was greatly reduced. One person could concentrate on guiding the sterile cannula through the vaginal cavity into the cervical os while another could pump the syringe to develop the vacuum. The Del Em made the procedure more comfortable, with personal control of the suction.

Downer considers the teaching and usage of self-help groups to be a key radical feminist action to ensure women's reproductive sovereignty.

== Legality ==
ME was developed and used before the Roe v. Wade Supreme Court decision legalized abortion in 1973. In order to avoid legal issues, Downer and Rothman downplayed the device's potential use as an abortion method. They called the new technique "menstrual extraction" or "ME" to highlight its harmless use in suctioning out menstrual blood and tissue. To further emphasize the innocuousness of ME, "the procedure was only performed when a woman's period was due, and they wouldn't take a pregnancy test beforehand. That way, everyone had plausible deniability."

Since 1971, groups performing menstrual extractions have had an excellent safety record, obviating any opportunity for legal action culminating in the prosecution of any individual. However, the possibility of legal troubles continues to exist, and because of that many of these self-help groups have sought legal advice and researched the laws in the states in which they perform ME. Additionally, many of these self-help groups do not publicize themselves or offer menstrual extraction to those outside of their tight-knit groups, in order to protect themselves and their techniques from legal investigations.

There is one instance in which Carol Downer had legal entanglements. It is well known as the "Yogurt Defense" case, in which Downer was arrested while at her self-help group and charged with practicing medicine without a license because she inserted yogurt into the vagina of Z. Budapest, another member of the group, as treatment for a yeast condition. Downer went to trial and was acquitted, as the jury did not see inserting yogurt as practicing medicine.

== Usage ==
=== Pre-Roe v. Wade ===
ME made its debut at the National Organization for Women conference in Santa Monica, California, in August 1971. To Rothman and Downer's dismay, the organizers of the conference were "so appalled that they refused to give the women exhibit space." Instead, Downer and Rothman hung flyers around the conference, announcing a demonstration in their hotel room. The attendees were given a plastic speculum to begin their education. From the extensive mailing list collected during these demonstrations, Downer and Rothman began a national tour, going all over the country (to 23 cities on a Greyhound bus) teaching the new technique. According to the National Women's Health Network, "the early self-helpers advocated that women join self-help groups and practice extracting each others' menses around the time of their expected periods." The Roe v. Wade Supreme Court decision made abortion legal in 1973. After that, menstrual extraction was practiced much less, though it did not disappear.

=== After legalization of abortion ===
It did begin to regain its popularity in the late 1980s and early 1990s, when the U.S. Supreme Court ruled on Webster v. Reproductive Health Services, which limited access to abortion by state of residence and type of medical insurance. Self-helpers even reprised the 1971 tour, traveling around the U.S. sharing self-examination and menstrual extraction techniques; however it never reached the heights of the early 1970s.

Menstrual extraction has regained popularity once again in the 2010s, in addition to other self-induced abortion methods. These self-helpers are following the 1970s methods of teaching by meeting in other women's homes, performing cervix examinations on each other, and learning menstrual extraction directly from other women. One new underground network, made up of women knowledgeable about ME and other self-induced abortion methods, has performed over 2,000 abortions between 2015 and 2018. The women involved in this network range from those in medical professions, such as nurses or midwives, to others like herbalists or those just interested in learning the procedure. Many of the participants in these networks, and women who seek self-induced abortions overall, are low-income earners, cannot travel to obtain an abortion, or dislike clinical settings.

== Similar techniques ==
Although menstrual extraction is technically similar to manual vacuum aspiration (MVA) and menstrual regulation (MR), it is a unique form because it is not medicalized. It originated in the feminist self-help movement and it is performed by small groups of women where the person getting a ME has complete control over the procedure. Menstrual extraction "minimiz[es]... power differentials between providers and receivers... [which] stands in direct contrast to [MVA and MR]."

Around the same time that menstrual extraction was first used in the United States, a method utilizing nearly identical technology was beginning to be used internationally. This method, another type of manual vacuum aspiration, is most often called menstrual regulation. As with ME, menstrual regulation, when desired as a method of controlling fertility, is performed very early in the menstrual cycle, earlier than a pregnancy test can be performed. One main difference between these two methods is the equipment used. The Del Em was a do-it-yourself assembly consisting of three parts: a cannula with a one-way valve, a collection jar and a syringe, all connected with plastic tubing. Meanwhile, menstrual regulation is performed with a commercially produced kit consisting of two parts: a cannula with a one-way valve and a directly connected syringe. With this kit, the contents of the uterus are sucked directly into the syringe. ME is performed by a group, while menstrual regulation is performed by an individual practitioner.

According to the National Abortion Federation (NAF), "in the developing world, menstrual regulation is still a crucial strategy to circumvent anti-abortion laws." Although abortion is illegal in Bangladesh, the government has long supported a network of menstrual regulation clinics. It is estimated that 468,000 menstrual regulations are performed each year in Bangladesh. NAF also reports, "some other countries allow menstrual regulation because it presumably takes place without a technical verification of pregnancy". Said countries are claimed to include Korea, Singapore, Hong Kong, Thailand, and Vietnam. In Cuba, where abortion is legal, menstrual regulation is widely practiced—menstrual extraction is offered to everyone whose period is two weeks late, without a pregnancy test.
