= Allis clamp =

Surgical instrument

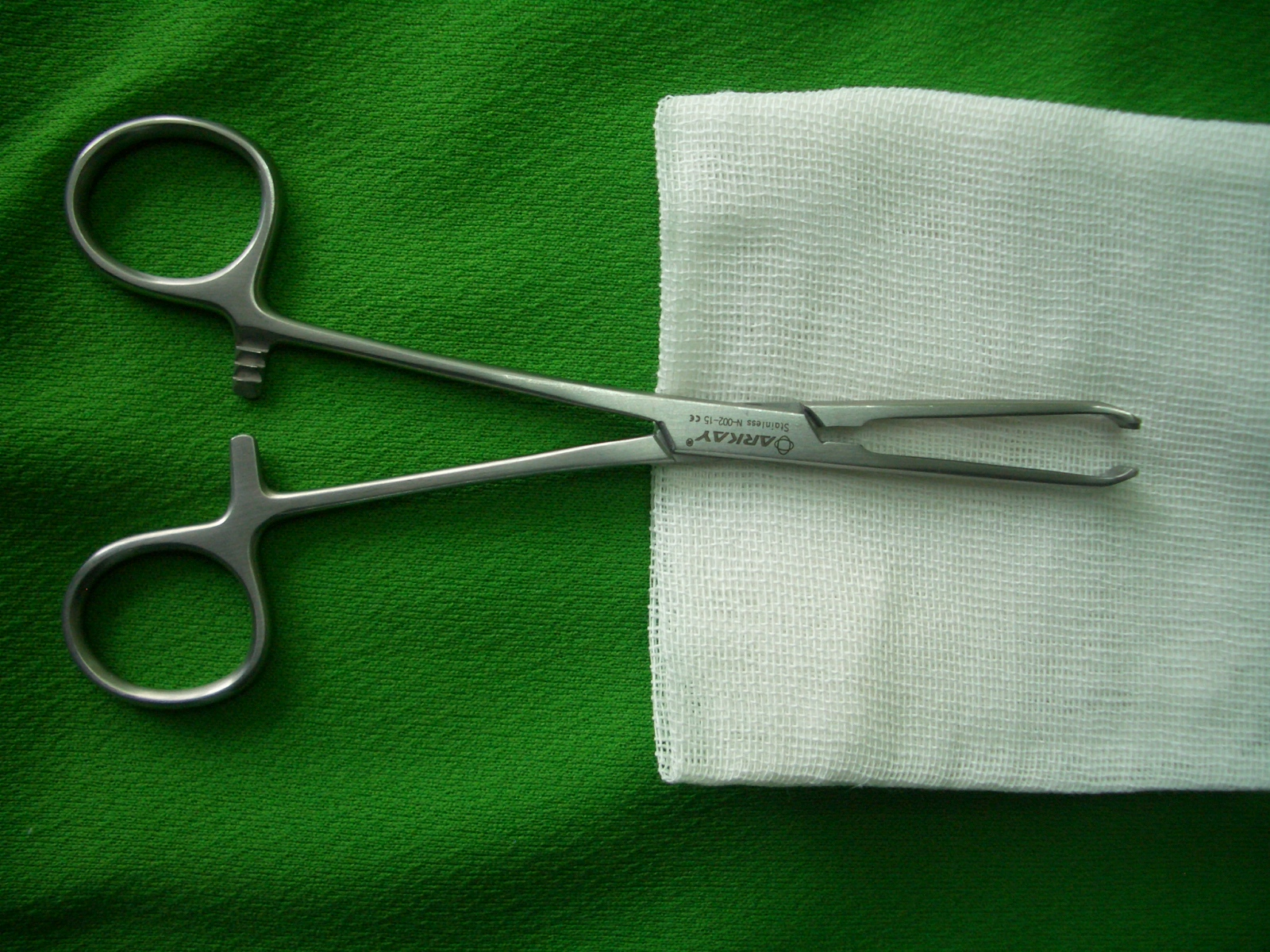
Allis clamp

An Allis clamp (also called the Allis forceps) is a commonly used surgical instrument. It was invented by Oscar Allis a renowned American surgeon in 1883. He designed them specifically for use in abdominal surgeries, and they are now used in many surgical procedures due to their versatility.

- The Allis clamp is a surgical instrument with sharp teeth, used to hold or grasp heavy tissue. It is also used to grasp fascia and soft tissues such as breast or bowel tissue. Allis clamps can cause damage, so they are often used in tissue about to be removed.
- When used to grasp the cervix to stabilize the uterus, such as when an intrauterine device is being inserted, an Allis clamp has the advantage of causing less bleeding than the more commonly used tenaculum (sin. Pozzi forceps).

== See also ==
- Instruments used in general surgery
