= Practicing without a license =

Act of working without a required license

Practising without a license is the act of working without the licensure offered for that occupation, in a particular jurisdiction. Most activities that require licensure also have penalties for practicing without a valid, current license. In some jurisdictions, a license is offered but not required for some professions.

== Types ==
Professions where practicing without a license carry civil or criminal penalties include lawyer, physician, physician assistant, optometrist, audiologist, speech language pathologist, podiatrist, surgeon, coroner, medical examiner, paramedic, funeral director, osteopath, chiropractor, dentist, pharmacist, engineer, pilot, broadcasting, nurse, veterinarian, midwife, teacher, psychologist, notary public, surveyor, detective, social worker, architect, barber, hairdresser, electrologist, tattooist, cosmetologist, real estate agent, plumber, florist, accountant, and masseuse. If a person offering their services is licensed in one of these professions, any member of the public has a right to know if that person is validly licensed or not by the licensing authority. Anyone who claims to have a license and refuses to identify themselves properly by first and last name can possibly lose any one or all of their licenses. In many jurisdictions, it is illegal for service providers to hide their identities for purposes of making it difficult to verify licensure and past disciplinary actions or license violations.

License requirements vary widely with jurisdiction, sometimes even within a single country.

=== Exceptions ===
Practicing a professional discipline (or certain aspects thereof) without a license may be legal in some jurisdictions. For example:

- Nine U.S. states have passed health freedom laws that protect alternative practitioners such as herbalists from prosecution for "practicing medicine without a license."
- In the area of mental health, Oregon offers broad licensing exemptions for professional counselors and marriage and family therapists, allowing people to practice these professions either with or without a license.
- Colorado requires registration but not licensing for psychotherapists.
- In California, while electrical engineering generally requires licensure, it is clarified that the design and layout of electronic circuits itself is not protected, generally protecting DIY electronics projects. Furthermore, as per section 6747 of the Professional Engineers Act, licensure is not required for industrial or commercial products made by the company that hired or contracted an engineer, meaning electrical engineers do not need licenses to design, research, or test consumer electronics for their employers or personal small business, such as Apple Inc. or a small modular synthesizer company.

=== Other unlicensed activity ===
Other occupations, such as operating a business or working as a professional driver or mariner, may require specialized licensure, as well. Operating a business without proper licenses can result in financial and sometimes criminal penalties. These licenses can include a general business license, a liquor license, a specialized drivers license, and other types regulated by local, regional, state, or federal requirements. Certain occupations may require obtaining appropriate intellectual property licenses, such as music licensing, brand licensing, patent licensing, software licensing, and other permissions for use.

Nonprofessional activities may also require licenses for participation. These include driver's license, amateur radio license, dog license, firearms license, hunting license, marriage license, and pilot license. Using certain products or services may also require obtaining a license, such as a software license. Operating without these licenses can lead to civil and criminal penalties.

Penalties vary depending on the severity of the infraction, but practicing without a valid, current license may be punishable by one or more methods, including community service, fine, restitution, probation, and temporary or permanent loss of the license. Criminal charges can lead to incarceration, as they can range from a misdemeanor to a felony, depending on the severity of the infraction.

== Noted incidents ==
On July 6, 1885, Louis Pasteur, a chemist who was a pioneer in microbiology, treated Joseph Meister after the boy was mauled by a dog infected with rabies with a vaccination treatment that had thus far been tested only on animals. This was technically illegal, considering Pasteur was not a licensed physician, but his colleagues agreed that since Pasteur's treatment seemed the only viable option to save the boy from almost certain death, it had been a necessary bending of the law, and since the treatment was a complete success, Pasteur was treated as a hero, and charges were never filed.

Another more modern example is the case of Frank Abagnale, who was accused of impersonating an airline pilot, lawyer, and teaching assistant.

The "yogurt defense" was made famous by the trial of Carol Downer, one of the developers of menstrual extraction. She was arrested at her self-help group and charged with practicing medicine without a license, as she inserted yogurt into the vagina of another woman to treat a yeast condition. Downer was acquitted; the jury did not equate inserting yogurt with practicing medicine.

A contemporary example is a San Francisco Bay Area resident, Kim Thien Le, who had a valid pharmacy technician license that had expired, and who had practiced as a pharmacist—supervising pharmacist and pharmacy technician interns, giving vaccinations, and filling prescriptions and counseling patients on medication—at at least three Walgreens pharmacies (in Fremont, Milpitas, and San Jose) between 2006 and October 2017, when she was caught. An investigation by the California Attorney General and the California State Board Of Pharmacy is ongoing. If Le avoids criminal prosecution or civil lawsuits, the stores could still face penalties such as formal reprimands, fines, or loss of their pharmacy business license, and she would likely not be able to practice again as a pharmacy technician. She filled at least 745,000 prescriptions, some for dangerous or complex legal drugs or for people with serious conditions, over this period. She used licenses of two separate individuals, at least one of whom had a similar name to hers, to avoid detection by the company or the board.

== In fiction ==
=== Anime and manga ===
Black Jack is a Japanese comic book series created by Tezuka Osamu that is about the world's greatest surgeon, who chooses to remain unlicensed. This allows Black Jack to charge extortionate amounts of money instead of the standard fees agreed upon by the Japanese Medical Association. It also lets him perform extremely dangerous, often medically implausible or impossible operations, that are not legally allowed. Black Jack is often viewed as the Japanese equivalent to Batman, in his willingness to routinely break laws to save lives for which he is frequently imprisoned by the police. Notably, Black Jack actually completed his college medical education and carries a driver's license, though he encourages other unlicensed doctors who have no such formal training. Like many of Osamu's works, Black Jack is extraordinarily critical of the medical establishment, and is notable for raising Japanese public awareness of medical corruption.

In episode 34 of Monster, Kenzo Tenma meets a young Vietnamese girl who works as an unlicensed doctor where she treats Asian immigrants.

In Durarara!!, the character Shinra Kishatani works as an unlicensed doctor.

In Kill la Kill, the character Barazo Mankanshoku operates a back-alley clinic in Honno City.

=== Comics ===
The majority of superheroes in comic books investigate crimes without detectives' licenses.

- In DC Comics, The Question, Dick Grayson, Detective Chimp, John Constantine and John Jones/Martian Manhunter are all licensed detectives or police officers, while Wally West, the third Flash, is a professional crime-scene investigator. Jonah Hex is a bounty hunter operating under the loose legal framework of the Wild West. The Green Lantern Corps patrols the D.C. universe and enforces the ancient intergalactic laws of the guardians of Oa. Batman is one of only three members of the Justice League with any medical training, but is the only one who lacks an official doctorate and license to practice medicine. Nevertheless, he occasionally performs surgery on his teammates. He is also the son of the doctor Thomas Wayne. The Crime Doctor is a known underworld doctor.

=== Books ===
Victor Frankenstein, though often incorrectly referred to as a doctor, is only a medical student, and as such, operated on his monster without a license. Prior to the monster's vivification, Frankenstein and his assistant Igor were also acting as unlicensed morticians.

=== TV and films ===
The movie Catch Me If You Can details about Frank Abagnale.

The movie Patch Adams, among other historical inaccuracies, showed the title character practicing medicine without a license, and getting his equipment by stealing from a hospital.

In The Grim Adventures of Billy & Mandy episode "The Secret Snake Club vs. P.E.," it is revealed that Billy's father Harold works as a back-alley doctor.

The USA Network drama Suits' protagonist, Michael "Mike" Ross, gets a high-flying job at the fictitious Pearson Hardman law firm without having the necessary license to practice law.

In Agents of S.H.I.E.L.D., Calvin Zabo works as a back-alley doctor.

The film Hotel Artemis features the titular hotel as a secret hospital for criminals.

In Batwoman, Kate Kane's stepsister Mary Hamilton-Kane runs her own back-alley clinic to tend to the poor and homeless.

In Kamen Rider Ex-Aid, Taiga Hanaya is an unlicensed doctor who runs his own clinic after his license is stripped from him.

In Abigail, the abductor with the alias of "Joey" worked as a military doctor and later became an underworld doctor after she was drummed out of service for "shooting up Uncle Sam's morphine" according to the titular character.

== See also ==
- Unauthorized practice of law
- License
- Permit (disambiguation)
- Occupational licensing
- Lay preacher
