= Tao brush =

Medical instrument for endometrial biopsy

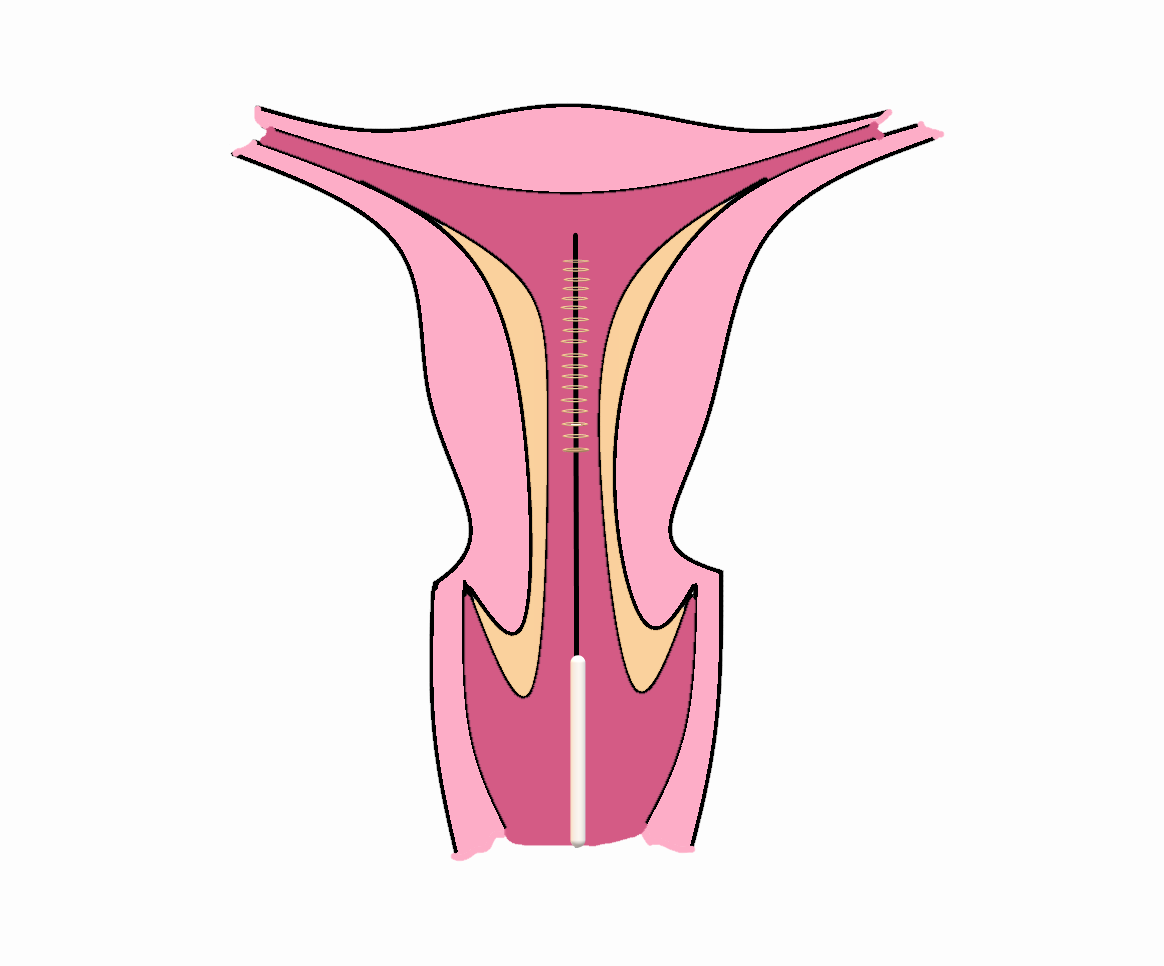
Illustration of Tao brush technique

The Tao brush is a medical instrument used to perform an alternative method of endometrial biopsy, for the purpose of detecting endometrial cancer.

The traditional method of endometrial biopsies uses a specialized catheter (the Pipelle) to suction away a portion of the uterine lining. The Tao brush method instead uses a small, flexible brush to gently brush the entire inside of the uterus. The Tao brush is theoretically able to gather a more complete sampling of the uterus lining, removes less tissue, and some reports suggest that it is less painful than the traditional method. The Tao brush biopsy is able to detect endometrial adenocarcinoma, which accounts for 97% of all endometrial cancers.

== Procedure ==
The procedure for the Tao brush biopsy is: The patient will be asked to lie on the table with her feet in the stirrups, as for a routine pelvic exam. The brush will be inserted into the uterus. The covering sheath will protect the brush from collecting any contaminating tissue from the cervix. Once the brush is in place, the sheath is removed.

The brush is then rotated 4–5 times, collecting tissue from the entire uterine lining. The sheath is then replaced, ensuring that the tissue samples are trapped on the brush. The brush is removed and placed directly in the fixative solution.

The entire procedure takes approximately 30 seconds and can be completed at the same time as a routine Pap smear.

The sample will be ready for processing in about 30 minutes and can be stored for several weeks, allowing it to be transported to an offsite laboratory.
