= Hegar dilators =

Medical implement

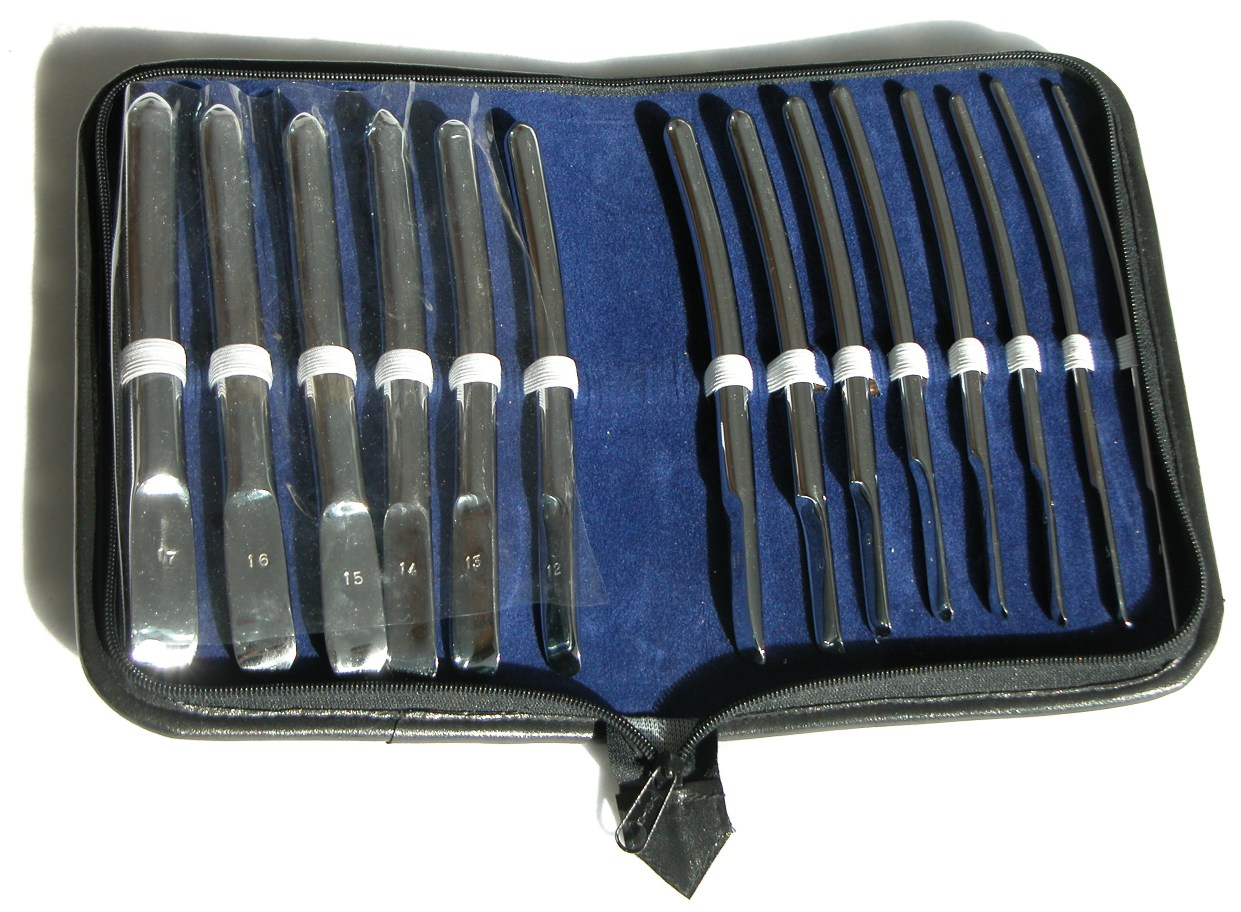
A set of Hegar dilators, from Hegar 4 to 17 (right to left)

Hegar dilators are dilators used to treat vaginismus and induce cervical dilation, and for inflatable penile implant procedures, though for penile implants it has been shown that outcomes are better without dilation.

== Description ==
Hegar dilators were developed and introduced by Alfred Hegar in 1879 originally for use in the field of gynecology. Typically, dilators are a set of metal rods of increasing diameters, from a few millimeters up to 26 millimeters. The rods are round, slightly curved, and have a conal tip. Some sets have conal tips at both ends, while others have one end flattened for easy handling. Hegar dilators are typically marked with a Hegar number that is equivalent to its size in millimeters (e.g., a Hegar size 8 is 8 mm thick).

Commercially available Hegar dilators are commonly sold in sets of 8, 10, or 14 individual rods. Each set includes a range of sizes, popularly from 3 mm to 17 mm for single-ended dilators or 3 mm / 4 mm to 17 mm / 18 mm for double-ended dilators, though configurations with sizes anywhere from 1 mm to 26 mm do exist.

== Use in the treatment of vaginismus ==
Hegar dilators are used to treat vaginismus, also known as genito-pelvic pain disorder. Patients with vaginismus use Hegar dilators of gradually increasing size, potentially followed by penetration by their partner. They have also found application in the management of hymenal stenosis.

== Cervical procedure use ==
Hegar dilators are used to induce cervical dilation in order to gain entry to the interior of the uterus.

During the process of dilation, the cervix may have to be stabilized with a tenaculum, and then the dilators are slowly entered into the cervical canal with a lubricant, starting with a thin, low Hegar number rod and progressing gradually to larger numbers. The dilators can also be used to sound the uterus.

Laminaria rods have also been used to open up the cervix but work slowly as they increase size by absorbing water.

== Non-gynecological uses ==
Typical non-gynecological uses include dilating a stenotic percutaneous gastrostomy stoma, anal dilation and urethral dilation in the case of stricture or stenosis.

== Penile implant procedure use ==
Hegar dilators (commonly, sizes 11 and 12) have been used during the insertion of two intracorporal cylinders into the corpus cavernosum penis during penile implant procedures, but it has been shown that outcomes are better without this dilation, which destroys erectile tissue. These cylinders are inflated and deflated by a pump that moves sterile saline under pressure between a holding reservoir and the cylinders, inflating or deflating an erection of the penis.
