= Paracervical block =

Anesthetic procedure

A paracervical block is an anesthetic procedure used in obstetrics and gynecology, in which a local anesthetic is injected into between two and six sites at a depth of 3–7 mm alongside the vaginal portion of the cervix in the vaginal fornices. In the United States, the paracervical block is underutilized during insertion of intrauterine devices (IUDs). There is speculation that this is related to the disproportionate under-researching of women's health.

It is used for various obstetric and gynecologic procedures, such as hysteroscopy and vacuum aspiration. It is as efficient as intracervical block, according to a study on women undergoing vacuum aspiration with lidocaine as anesthetic agent.

The majority of surgical abortions in the United States are performed with a paracervical block with or without the addition of other pain medications. The best specific technique has yet to be defined and there is still a lot of procedure-related pain. The choice of the best anesthesia depends on patient preference and resources available.

In addition, a paracervical block may be performed by a wide variety of clinicians including family medicine physicians, OB/GYNs, advanced practitioners, certified nurse midwives, and RNs.

Addition of ketorolac may offer added benefit of improved pain control.
