= Permit =

Permit may refer to:

== Licenses ==
- Construction permit, required in most jurisdictions for new construction, or adding onto pre-existing structures
- Disabled parking permit, displayed upon a vehicle carrying a person whose mobility is significantly impaired
- Filming permit, required in most jurisdictions for filming motion pictures and television
- Home Return Permit, travel permit for Hong Kong and Macao residents
- International Driving Permit, allows an individual to drive a private motor vehicle in another nation
- One-way Permit, document issued by the People's Republic of China allowing residents of mainland China to leave the mainland for Hong Kong
- Learner's permit, restricted license that is given to a person who is learning to drive
- Protest permit, permission granted by a governmental agency for a demonstration
- Work permit, legal authorization which allows a person to take employment

== Submarines ==
- Permit-class submarine, a United States Navy class of nuclear-powered fast attack submarines
- USS Permit (SS-178), a Porpoise-class submarine of the United States Navy
- USS Permit (SSN-594), the lead submarine of the Permit class

== Other uses ==
- Permit (film), a 1979 Pakistani Punjabi film
