= Harvey Karman =

American psychologist (1924–2008)

- Born: Harvey Walters; April 26, 1924; Clatskanie, Oregon, United States
- Died: May 6, 2008 (aged 84); Santa Barbara, California, United States
- Occupation: psychologist
- Known for: abortion techniques
- Notable work: Karman cannula
- Spouse: Felice Karman
- Children: Janice Karman

Harvey Leroy Karman (April 26, 1924 – May 6, 2008) was an American psychologist and the inventor of the Karman cannula, a flexible suction cannula used for early-term abortions.

Karman was born Harvey Walters in Clatskanie, Oregon. His father abandoned him when Harvey was young. He subsequently took the surname of one of his several stepfathers, William Karman.

== Conviction ==
In 1955, Karman, who at the time was working towards his doctorate in psychology and who was not licensed to practice medicine, used a speculum and a nutcracker to perform an abortion on a woman in a California motel room, who subsequently died. He was convicted of providing abortion, which was illegal in California at the time. He served two-and-a-half years in state prison.

== "Super coils" ==
Karman also developed the "super coil" abortion technique, which he believed would enable lay practitioners to perform second-trimester abortions with little training or equipment. The coils were inserted into the uterus, where they caused irritation leading to the expulsion of the fetus. The first trial of the super coil method was on Bangladeshi rape victims under the sponsorship of the International Planned Parenthood Federation. These generally resulted in high rates of injury to the patient.

One trial of the super coil method took place in Philadelphia, Pennsylvania, on May 13 and 14, 1972. Fifteen women in their second trimester traveled from Chicago to Philadelphia, where Dr. Kermit Gosnell — later convicted as a serial killer for infanticide and manslaughter as well as federal drug charges for operating a lucrative "pill mill" — used Karman's method to perform their abortions. A public television crew from a station in New York City filmed the procedures at Karman's invitation. Nine of the fifteen had complications, three of those with major complications.

== Flexible cannula ==
Karman invented a soft, flexible cannula for abortions. At the time of his death at Cottage Hospital in Santa Barbara, California in 2008, it was still in wide use around the world.

== Personal life ==
Karman was the father of Janice Karman.
