= Uterine perforation =

- Specialty: Emergency medicine

Uterine perforation is a potential complication of any intrauterine procedure. It may be associated with injury to surrounding blood vessels or viscera such as the bladder or intestine. If not diagnosed at the time of the procedure it can occasionally result in massive hemorrhage or sepsis; however, the majority of uterine perforations are sub-clinical and safely resolve by themselves without treatment and do not cause any significant long-term damage. Risk factors include cervical stenosis during trans-cervical procedures or decreased strength of the myometrial wall as in pregnancy or menopause.

== See also ==
- Uterine rupture
