= Tenaculum =

Surgical instrument

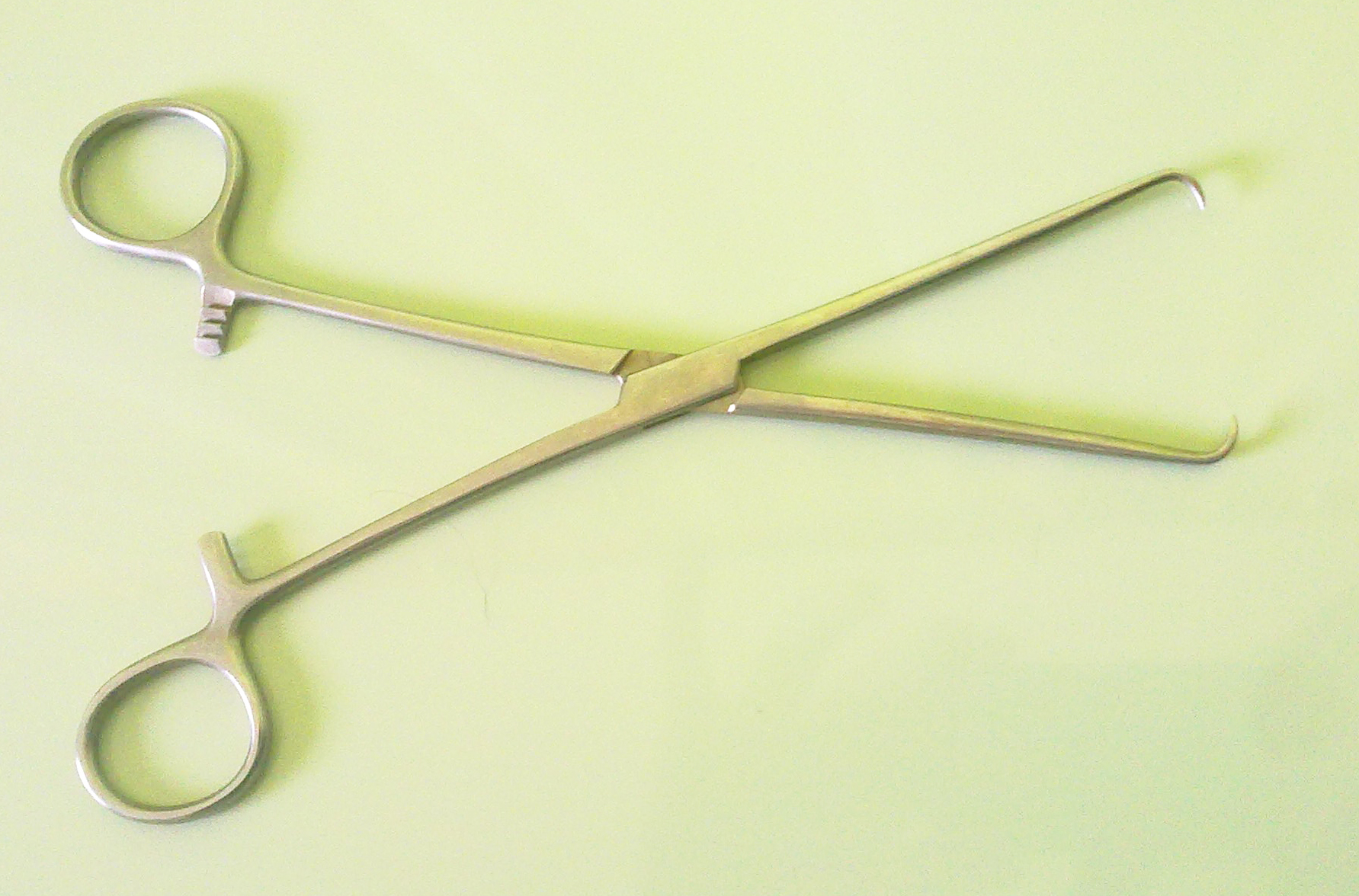
Tenaculum

A tenaculum, also known as Pozzi forceps, is a surgical instrument, usually classified as a type of forceps. It consists of a slender sharp-pointed hook attached to a handle and is used mainly in surgery for seizing and holding parts, such as blood vessels.

Uses include:

- Steadying the cervix and uterus, as is done during insertion of an intrauterine device or during a surgical abortion (although recent research indicates that an Allis clamp may be better suited for those tasks, as it is less likely to cause bleeding complications).
- Seizing and holding arteries in various surgical procedures.

== History ==
The tenaculum has been commonly used in gynecology for over a century. The predecessor of cervical tenaculum was a forceps bullet extractor – a common surgeon’s tool used to extract bullets on the battlefields. During the Civil War in the United States, this tool was used to remove bullets from the patient’s body or to pull out arteries to tie them off. Inspired by the shape of the bullet extractor, Samuel Jean Pozzi, a pioneer of modern gynecology, developed, at the end of 19th century, a gynecological tool called the Pozzi forceps, also known as the tenaculum. Since then, its shape has hardly changed and persists until today. An alternative suction-based device was approved by the FDA in 2023 and by the Medicines & Healthcare products Regulatory Agency in the UK in 2024 but as of 2024 is not available for sale.

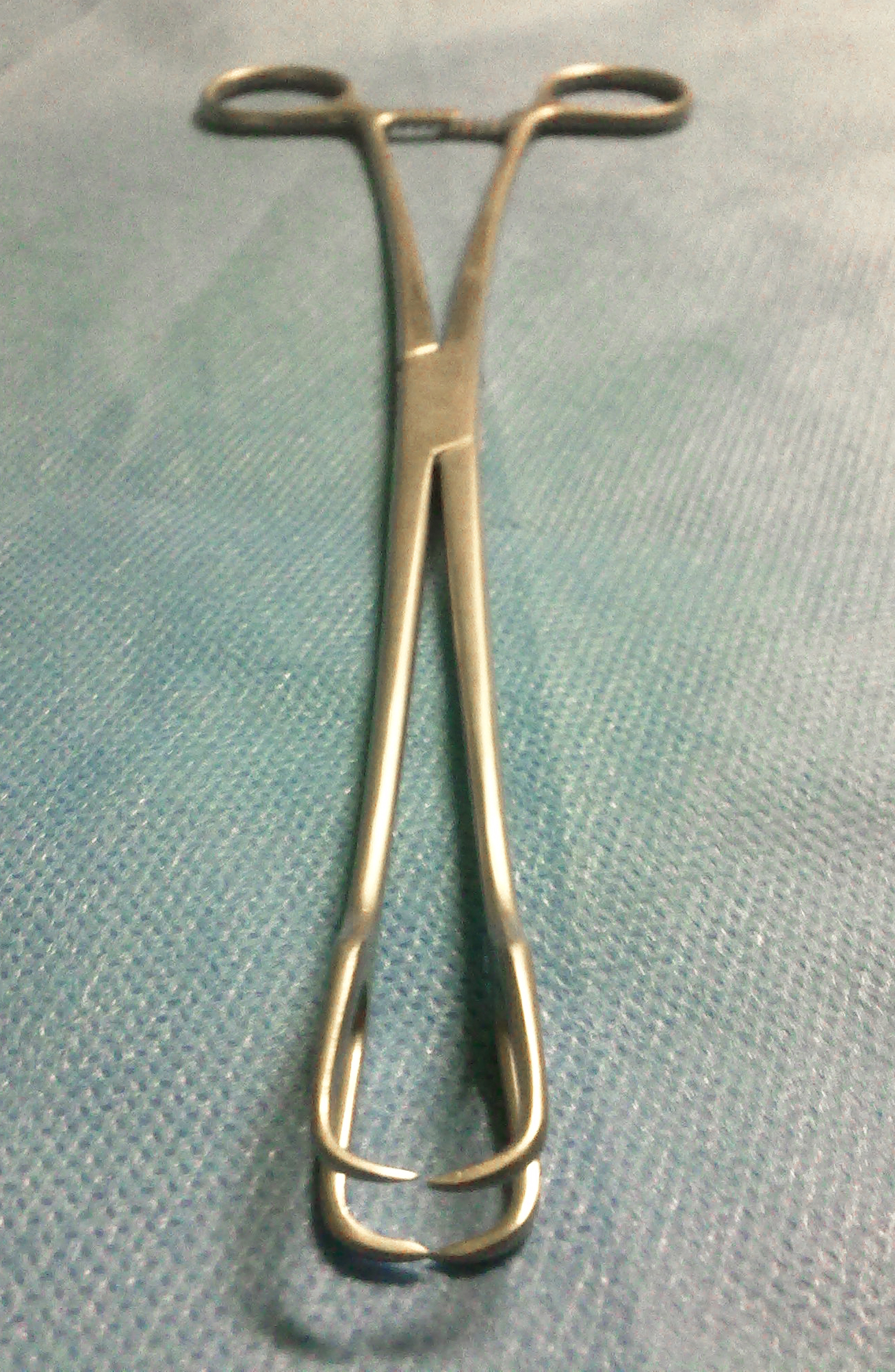

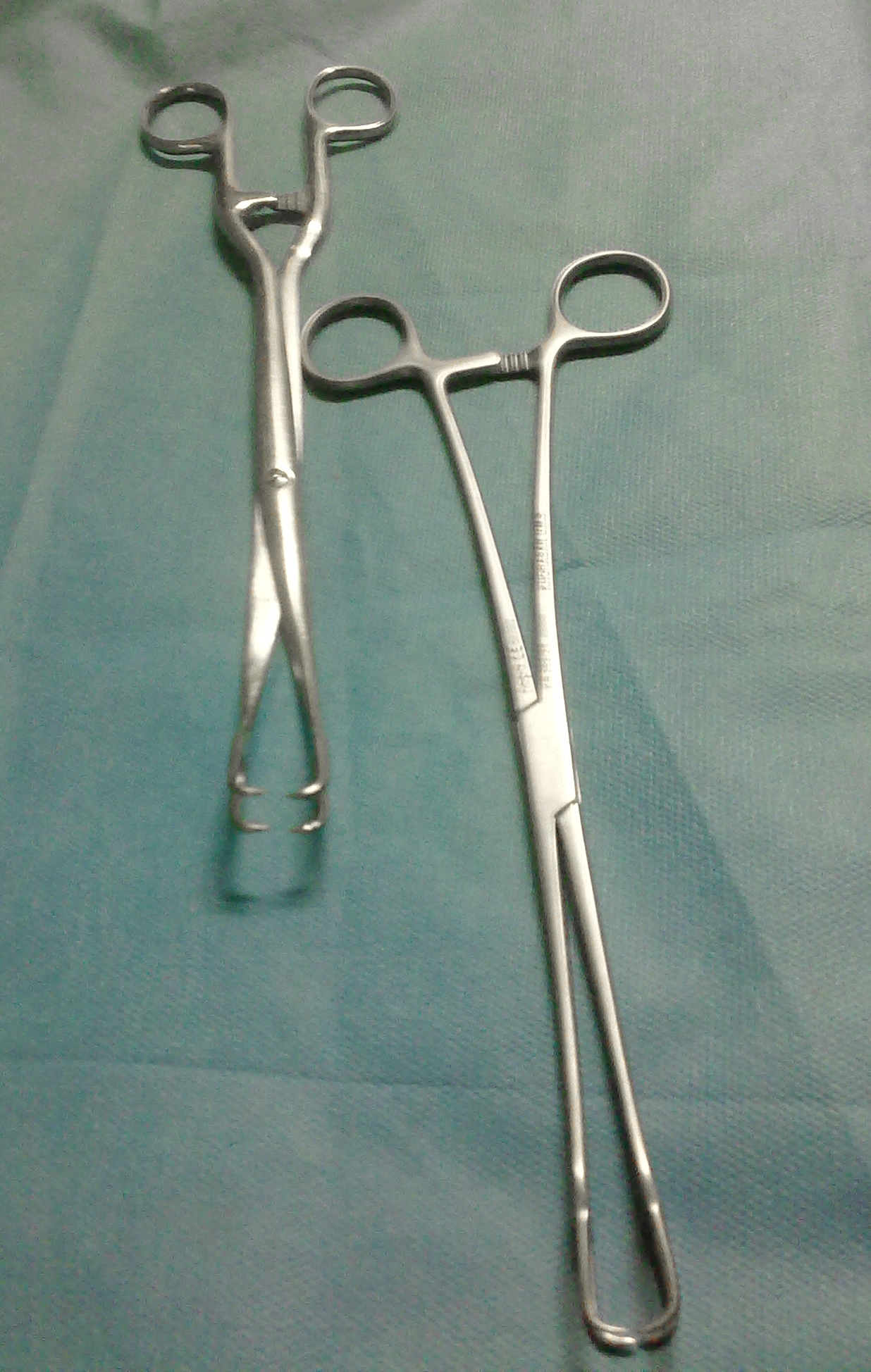

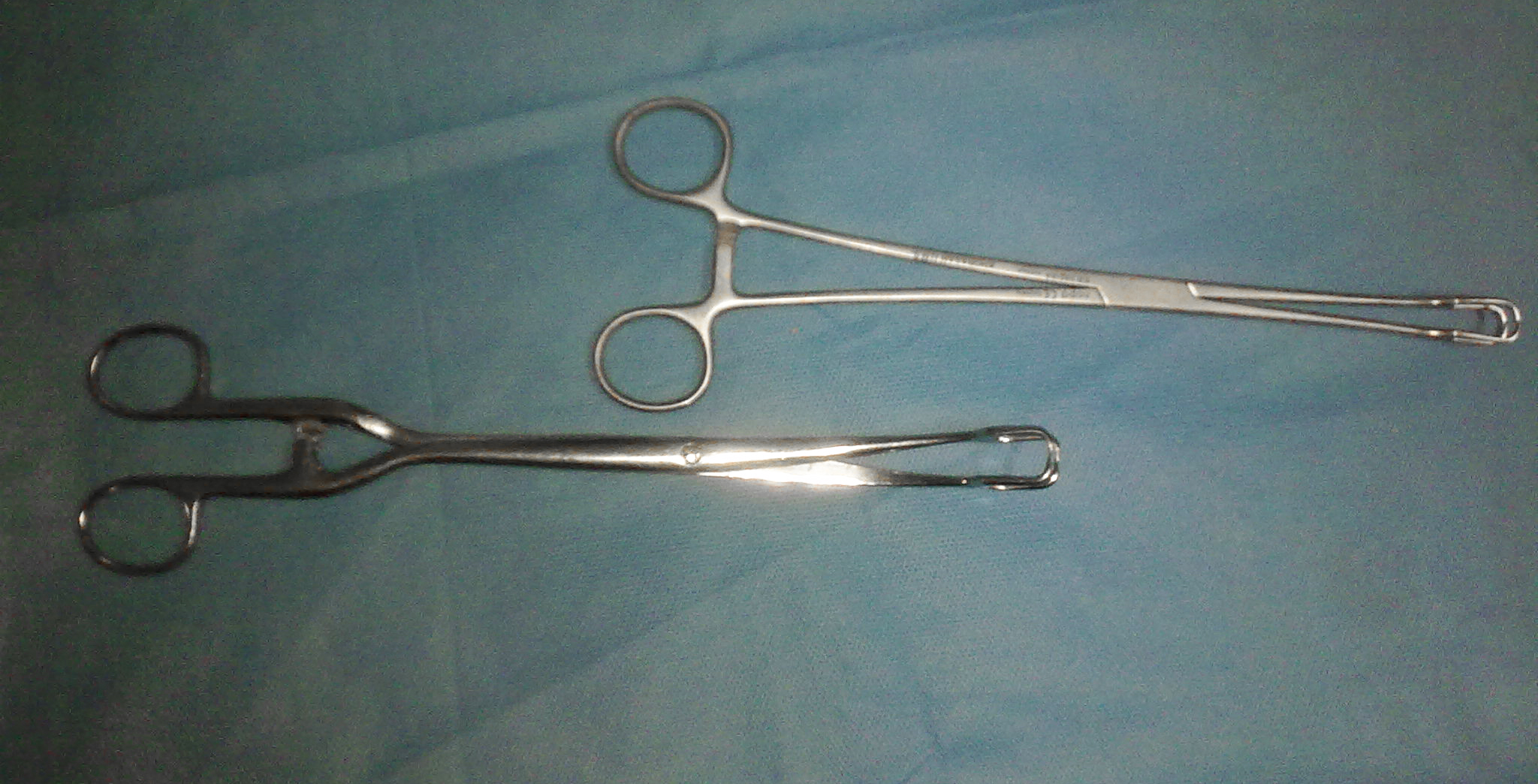

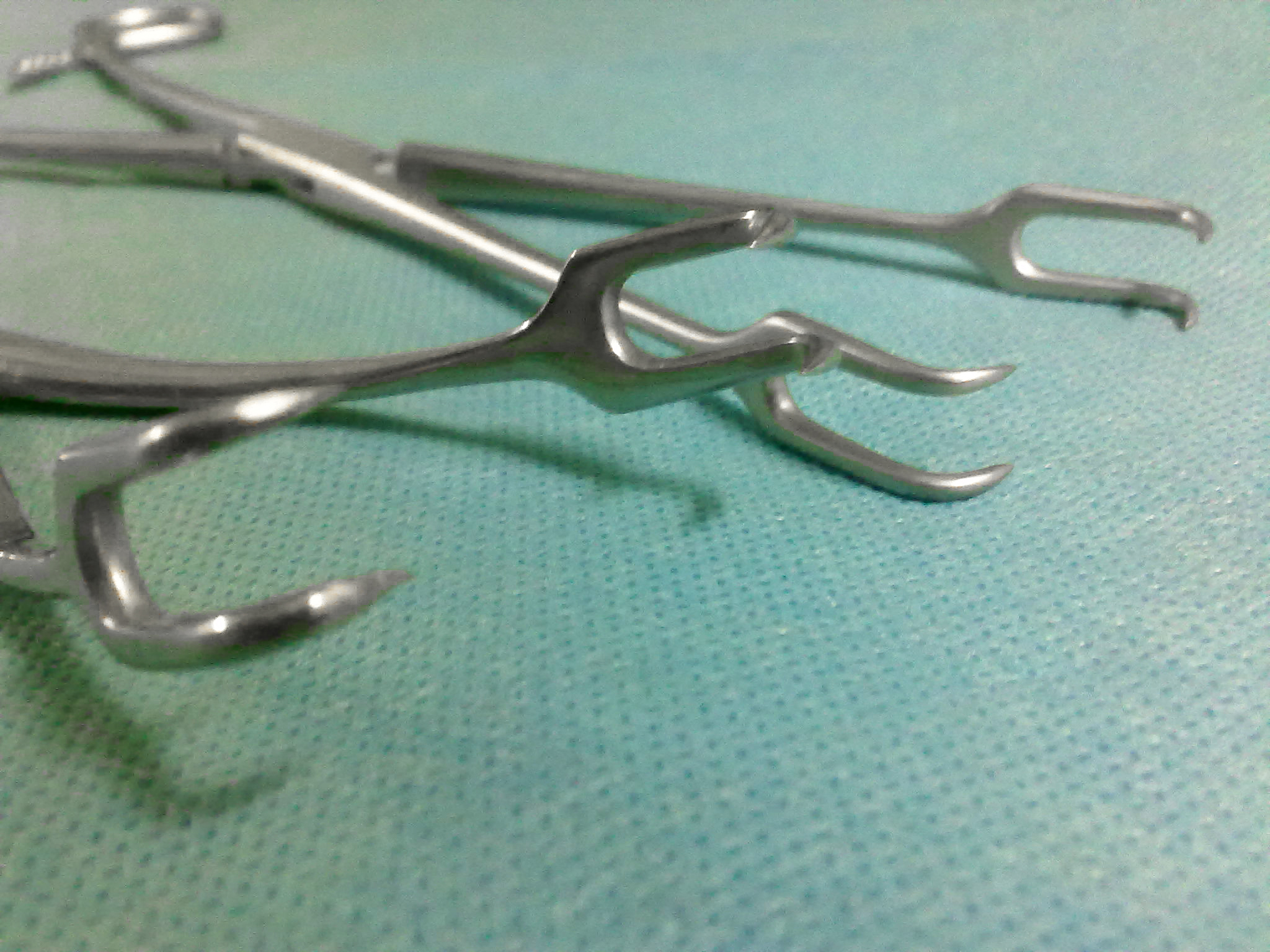

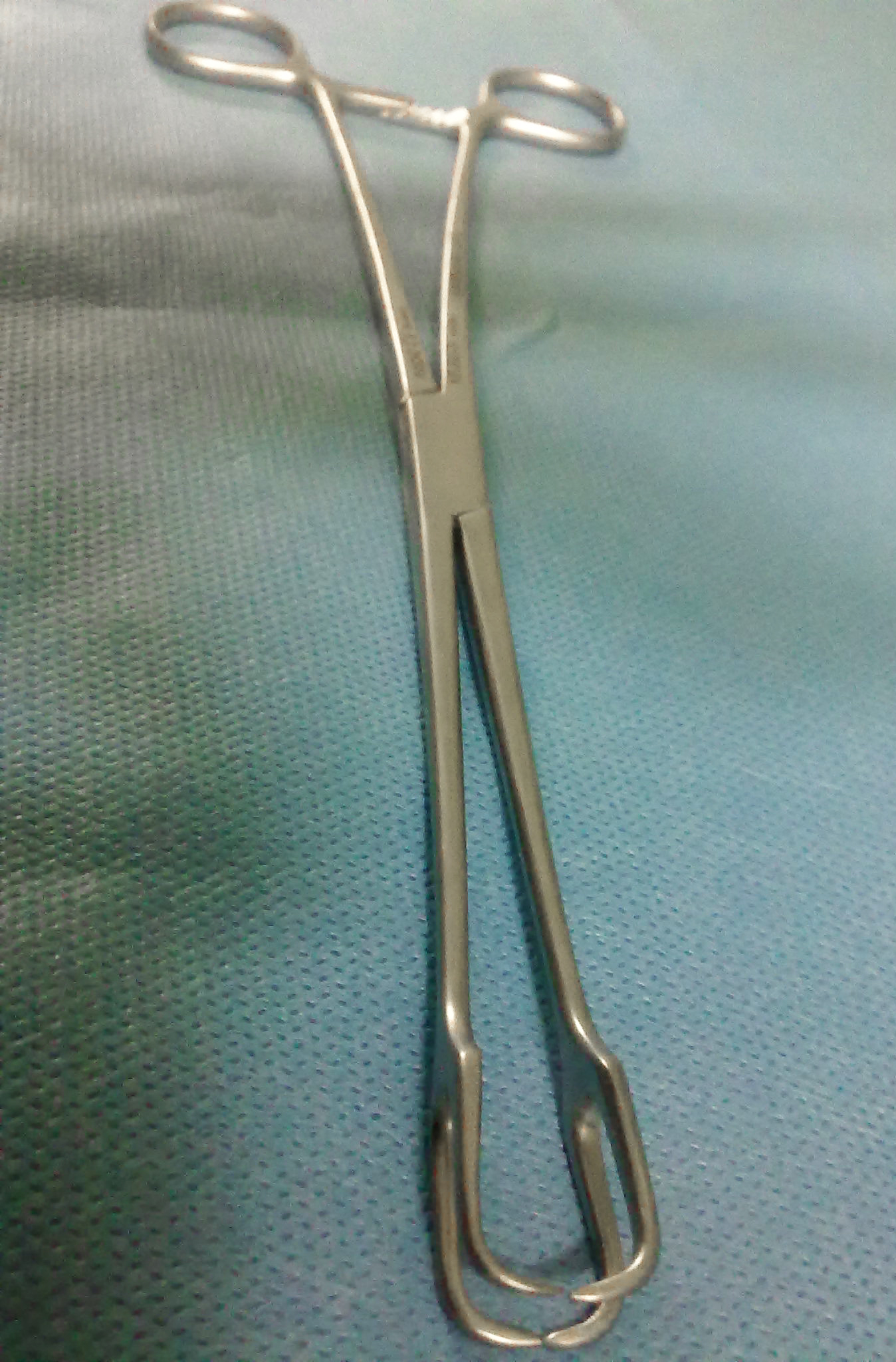

== See also ==
- Instruments used in general surgery
