= Azoulay v The Queen =

Supreme Court of Canada criminal law case

- Supreme Court of Canada

Hearing: Unknown Judgment: November 4, 1952
- Full case name: Leon Azoulay and Her Majesty the Queen
- Citations: [1952] 2 S.C.R. 495
- Prior history: Judgment for the Crown in the Quebec Court of King's Bench, Appeal Side
- Ruling: Appeal allowed

Holding
- A trial judge is required to review with the jury the substantial parts of the evidence and give the theory of the defence to the jury. When the evidence is technical, it is important for the judge to strip the evidence of the non-essentials.

Court membership
- Chief Justice: Thibaudeau Rinfret; Puisne Justices: Patrick Kerwin, Robert Taschereau, Ivan Rand, Roy Kellock, James Wilfred Estey, Charles Holland Locke, John Robert Cartwright, Gerald Fauteux

Reasons given
- Plurality: Taschereau; Rinfret concurring
- Concurrence: Estey
- Dissent: Rand
- Dissent: Fauteux
- Kerwin, Kellock, Locke, and Cartwright took no part in the consideration or decision of the case.

Azoulay v The Queen, [1952] 2 S.C.R. 495, is a decision by the Supreme Court of Canada relating to the role of a trial judge in giving instructions to a jury in a criminal case. The appellant, a medical professional in Montreal, was charged with murder, allegedly for having performed an abortion. The woman died of a haemorrhage in the appellant's office. The jury convicted the accused of manslaughter.

The issue on appeal was whether the trial judge gave adequate instructions to the jury on the medical evidence. By a 3–2 decision, the Supreme Court found that with complicated technical evidence, a judge should summarize it to a jury. The Court set aside the conviction and remitted the matter for a retrial.

== Background ==
Dr. Leon Azoulay was accused of murder after one of his patients died. This woman, described by Justice James Wilfred Estey as "Mrs. P.", had allegedly received an abortion from Azoulay which caused a fatal haemorrhage. An autopsy revealed evidence of an abortion.

The trial lasted for a week, with each side calling twelve witnesses. Both sides called medical doctors to give expert testimony as to the medical issues raised by the case, including the autopsy result which dealt with the cause of the haemorrhage.

The trial judge spoke about the law under which Azoulay was charged, and instructed the jury that to find Azoulay guilty, the Crown prosecutor must prove the case beyond a reasonable doubt. The trial judge declined to summarize the facts of the case, saying that they "have been well elaborated by the Defence and the Crown." The jury found Azoulay guilty of the lesser included offence of manslaughter. The trial judge sentenced him to seven years in prison. Quebec's Court of King's Bench, Appeal Side, upheld the conviction. The Chief Justice of Quebec dissented, finding that the trial judge's charge to the jury was inadequate.

== Decision of the Court ==
The Supreme Court overturned the trial, on a 3-2 split. A majority concluded that the appeal should be allowed, but did not give a single set of reasons.

=== Majority reasons ===
Justice Robert Taschereau gave reasons for himself and Chief Justice Thibaudeau Rinfret. He stated that he could imagine that there was sufficient evidence to convict Azoulay. However, he agreed with the dissenting chief justice in the lower court that the trial judge "failed to instruct properly the jury, in omitting to review the evidence." Taschereau relied on the Supreme Court's earlier decision in Spencer v Alaska Packers Association, which had held that judges should help guide the jury in giving "value and effect" to certain pieces of evidence. He held that the judge's failure to review the evidence meant the jury was "left in a state of confusion."

In his separate reasons, Estey wrote that the evidence in this case was "technical and somewhat involved," and that made it all the more necessary that a judge should help summarize the facts and distinguish important evidence from needless details. In particular, he found that the defence arguments were not adequately presented.

=== Dissenting reasons ===
Two dissents were written by Justices Ivan Rand and Gérald Fauteux.

Rand concluded that the defence was not actually complex, and the facts were generally accepted. For a judge to summarize the defence's arguments would have been redundant after a simple point had been repeated and explored many times.

Fauteux concluded that if the trial judge had summarized the expert testimony, this would work against rather than favour the defence's case.

== See also ==
- List of Supreme Court of Canada cases (Richards Court through Fauteux Court)
- Morgentaler v The Queen
- R v Morgentaler
- R v Morgentaler (1993)
- Tremblay v Daigle
