= Borowski v Canada (AG) =

- Supreme Court of Canada

Hearing: October 3 and 4, 1988 Judgment: March 9, 1989
- Full case name: Joseph Borowski v. The Attorney General of Canada
- Citations: [1989] 1 S.C.R. 342; 1989 CanLII 123 (S.C.C.); (1989), 57 D.L.R. (4th) 231; [1989] 3 W.W.R. 97; (1989), 47 C.C.C. (3d) 1; [1989] 38 C.R.R. 232; (1989), 75 Sask. R. 82
- Docket No.: 20411
- Prior history: Judgment for the Attorney General of Canada in the Court of Appeal for Saskatchewan.
- Ruling: Appeal dismissed.

Holding
- The doctrine of mootness has a two step analysis: (1)Has the dispute disappeared and the issue become academic, and if so, (2)Should the court exercise its discretion and hear the case?

Court membership
- Chief Justice: Brian Dickson; Puisne Justices: Jean Beetz, William McIntyre, Antonio Lamer, Bertha Wilson, Gerald Le Dain, Gérard La Forest, Claire L'Heureux-Dubé, John Sopinka

Reasons given
- Unanimous reasons by: Sopinka J.
- Beetz and Le Dain JJ. took no part in the consideration or decision of the case.

Borowski v Canada (AG), [1989] 1 S.C.R. 342 is the leading Supreme Court of Canada decision on mootness of an appealed legal issue. The Court declined to decide whether the fetus had a right to life under sections 7 and 15 of the Canadian Charter of Rights and Freedoms. Had they found in favour of Borowski, laws against abortion in Canada would have to have been again enacted. Thus, along with the later Supreme Court case Tremblay v Daigle (1989), Borowski "closed off litigation opportunities" by anti-abortion activists.

== Background ==
Joseph Borowski was an anti-abortion activist in Saskatchewan who wanted to challenge the abortion provisions under section 251 of the Criminal Code as violations of the Charter rights to life, security of person and equality of the foetus (because he felt the types of abortions permitted by the Therapeutic Abortion Committees were too liberal). He had previously been successful in gaining public interest standing to challenge the abortion law in the decision of Minister of Justice of Canada v. Borowski, [1981] 2 S.C.R. 575.

At trial the Court of Queen's Bench found that there was no violation as the foetus was not protected by the Charter rights that were argued. The Court of Appeal agreed that sections 7 and 15 did not apply.

The issues of appeal to the Supreme Court were concerning the constitutionality of section 251, given Borowski's arguments that it was too permissive in allowing for abortions. However, the earlier decision of R. v. Morgentaler had already struck down the provision (as being too restrictive on abortion, and therefore breaching the mother's rights under section 7) and so it could not be at issue. As the section had been struck down, the primary issue instead concerned whether Borowski had lost his standing.

== Opinion of the Court ==
Justice Sopinka wrote the decision for a unanimous Court. He held that the appeal was moot and that Borowski had lost his standing.

Sopinka characterized the doctrine of mootness as part of a general policy of the court to decline to hear hypothetical and abstract questions. He described a two step test for determining whether the issue is justiciable. First, the Court must determine "whether the requisite tangible and concrete dispute has disappeared rendering the issues academic," and if so, the court must decide whether it should exercise its discretion to hear the case anyway.

Sopinka found that the "live controversy" had disappeared with the striking down of section 251 of the Criminal Code, and that the Court should not exercise its discretion in these circumstances.

== See also ==
- List of Supreme Court of Canada cases (Dickson Court)
- Fetal Rights
