= Jacqueline Richard =

Canadian conductor (1928–2015)

Jacqueline Richard (March 8, 1928 - August 2, 2015) was a Québécoise Canadian pianist and conductor who resigned from the Order of Canada in 2009. Her resignation was in protest of the appointment of abortion provider Henry Morgentaler to the order.

== Biography ==
Jacqueline Richard was born March 8, 1928, in Montreal, Quebec.

Richard performed with Jeunesses Musicales Canada, during the years of 1950-1951, 1954-1955, and every year between 1957-1961.

In 1963, she founded the Boutique d'opéra. She presented 75 performances, in two years, of various operatic works including L'Oca del Cairo by Mozart.

In 1984, she co-founded the Atelier lyrique de l'Opéra de Montréal.

In 1985, she retired to coach singers privately.

She died on 2 August 2015 in Montreal.

== Accolades ==
- Jacqueline Richard was awarded the Quebec Lieutenant-Governor's medal in 1953.
- She was awarded the Order of Canada in 2004.
