= Pro-Choice Action Network =

The Pro-Choice Action Network (Pro-CAN) was a Canadian abortion rights advocacy group based in Vancouver, British Columbia. Founded in 1987 as the BC Coalition for Abortion Clinics, the group changed its name in 1998. It began publishing a quarterly newsletter, The Pro-Choice Press, in 1995. Pro-CAN was the largest and longest-established abortion rights organization in British Columbia. In November 1988, it successfully opened Everywoman's Health Centre. Groups including women's health groups, the labour movement, the United Church, student groups, and health care professionals supported Pro-CAN's initiative to open Everywoman's Health Centre. This opening is of notable importance because at that time, it was illegal for free-standing clinics to offer abortion services. The group stopped its activities on January 31, 2009, except for its website, and now refers visitors to the Abortion Rights Coalition of Canada.

== Lobbying and advocating ==
Pro-CAN lobbied and advocated for:

- the availability of safe, affordable, and effective contraception, and comprehensive sex education in schools;
- the government fully funding all health services relating to reproductive health in community-based clinics and hospitals, inclusive of surgical and medical abortion services;
- the defeat of any law that criminalizes abortion or impedes what they say is a woman's individual right to choice and access to abortion services;
- protection and enforcement of the Access to Abortion Services Act and women's safe access to abortion services in an atmosphere of dignity and respect;
- the principles of the Canada Health Act of May 1998; and
- provision for universal access to abortion in all regions of Canada and federal guarantee of their access.

== See also ==
- NARAL Pro-Choice America
- Abortion in Canada
