= Canadian Abortion Rights Action League =

Canadian Association for Repeal of the Abortion Law (CARAL) was a coalition of abortion rights activists created in 1974 to protest the incarceration of Dr. Henry Morgentaler, who was jailed for providing safe yet not legalized abortions in Canada. The organization later changed its name to the Canadian Abortion Rights Action League (Association Canadienne pour le Droit d'Avortement) (CARAL/ACDA).

The Canadian Abortion Rights Action League (CARAL) was an important organization in the movement to legalize abortion in Canada. It was created after Dr. Henry Morgentaler was jailed for performing abortions, and the group worked to challenge strict abortion laws. CARAL supported Morgentaler by raising money and pushing for political change. A few years later, they shifted focus mainly on political activism, while education and research work moved to another organization called the Childbirth by Choice Trust. CARAL remained quite active in promoting abortion rights during the 1980s and 1990s. When the Organization shut down in 2004, other groups, including Canadians for Choice and the Abortion Rights Coalition of Canada, continued to advocate for abortion rights in Canada.

== Founding and early years ==
Canadian Abortion Rights Action League was founded on June 20, 1973, in Toronto, by abortion rights activists June Callwood, Kay Macpherson, Lorna Grant, Eleanor Wright Pelrine, Esther Greenglass, and Henry Morgentaler. On November 19, 1974, the group founded the Canadian Abortion Rights Action League in Ottawa with Ed Ratcliffe of London, Ontario, as its president. Among the founding members were Norma Scarborough and Eleanor Wright Pelrine. A youthful experience affected Scarborough's attitude towards abortion. When she was a member of the Canadian Women's Army Corps in the 1940s, Scarborough found a colleague bleeding to death in barracks without medical attention. The woman was afraid to call for help because she had undergone an illegal abortion. Norma arrived too late: the woman bled to death. Her experience gave her a firm conviction that abortion should be legal.

The aim of CARAL was to legalize abortion in Canada. To accomplish this goal, they supported Dr. Henry Morgentaler's challenge of the 1969 abortion law, which required the approval of a hospital's Therapeutic Abortion Committee (TAC) before an abortion could be legally performed (without requiring TACs to be formed or to meet). Fewer than one-third of hospitals had TACs, and some TACs existed on paper but never met.

== Expansion and advocacy ==
In 1980, CARAL changed its name to the Canadian Abortion Rights Action League. In 1982, it separated its education and research arms as the "Childbirth by Choice Trust". This new organization focused on educating the public about birth control, abortion, and family planning. It also worked to support laws and policies that made abortion and reproductive healthcare easier to access in Canada. The Trust allowed CARAL to focus on political activism while still making sure people had information and resources to make safe choices regarding reproductive health.

CARAL formed provincial and local chapters across Canada. In July 1983, it set up the Pro-Choice Defence Fund and helped to raise funds for Morgentaler's legal fees. Its charter sought to assure that "no woman is denied the right to a safe, legal abortion" and to gain recognition that the right to a safe, legal abortion is a fundamental human right. Another reason that they supported Dr. Morgentaler was that the technique he developed, vacuum curettage, was safer and less invasive than the traditional dilation and curettage (D&C) that was traditionally performed at hospitals for abortions or after miscarriages. The development of non-surgical medical abortion for very early pregnancies has reduced maternal mortality still further.

In 1984, CARAL was incorporated as a non-profit organization. It was run by a volunteer board of directors and held annual general meetings each spring. The national office stayed in Ottawa. CARAL described itself as the only national abortion rights organization in Canada. In 1991, it had 36 chapters across the country with over 18,000 members. As its aim was to influence legislation, CARAL had no charitable status and relied entirely on private donations. It focused on keeping abortion legal and on improving access to birth control and abortion services. It lobbied federal and provincial legislators, asked governments to fund clinics, and published and spoke about abortion issues. It also supported the local chapters and medical doctors who provide abortion services. The organization was one of the first leaders of the pro-choice movement in Canada and had been lobbying against Canadas abortion law since 1960s. This period followed the legalization of birth control in 1969 and the amendment of the Criminal Code to allow hospital-based therapeutic abortions.

== Later work and research ==
CARAL also published a Newsletter, which was then renamed Pro-Choice News in 1985. In 2003, CARAL published a major study of access to abortion in Canada. The study found that only one hospital in six performs abortions and that ready access to abortion is found mainly in large cities and in a narrow strip of more densely populated land near the U.S. border. CARAL was a non profit organization run by a volunteer board of directors. its national office was in Ottawa, and by 1991 it had over 18,000 members. The organization relied on private donations, which allowed them to focus on their mission. During this time, CARAL worked to influence lawmakers, ask governments to fund clinics, teach the public about reproductive rights, and support local groups and doctors who provided abortions. all of these efforts were part of CARAL's goal to keep abortion legal and make it easier for people to get reproductive healthcare.

== Closure and legacy ==
In 2004 CARAL ended its operations and was effectively replaced in 2005 by the Abortion Rights Coalition of Canada/Coalition pour le Droit à l'Avortement au Canada (ARCC-CDAC) and a reproductive health resource group, Canadians for Choice (CFC). CFC focused more on education and research instead of political activism. In 2014 they joined two other groups to form Action Canada for Sexual Health and Rights, which combines advocacy with education on reproductive health. After CARAL closed, many activists felt abortion rights still needed protection. in 2005, Joyce Arthur started the Abortion Rights Coalition of Canada (ARCC), the only national political pro-choice group. ARCC works to protect abortion rights, improve access to services, and fight false information from anti choice groups. Even though abortion is legal in Canada, access is not the same everywhere. some provinces, like Saskatchewan, Manitoba, Alberta, and New Brunswick, make it harder to get services. ARCC works to make access fair across the country through advocacy, petitions, education and helping local activists. CARAL's work had a lasting effect, as groups like ARCC keep working to protect abortion rights.

== International context ==
Organizations in different countries worked to improve abortion rights and reproductive health. CARAL worked to improve abortion rights in Canada, but there were similar efforts in the United States. The National Association for the Repeal of Abortion Laws was started around the same time and is still active today. The sister organization of CARAL, the National Association for the Repeal of Abortion Laws, was founded and still operates in the United States. Action Canada for Sexual Health and Rights takes the work started by Canadian Abortion Rights Action League and connects it to the world by working with international partners and supporting reproductive rights in various countries. This shows that CARAL's legacy is part of a larger global movement for reproductive health and rights.

== Archives ==
To better understand the history and work of the Canadian Abortion Rights Action League, it is helpful to look at the records that have been preserved over time. There is a Canadian Abortion Rights Action League fond at Library and Archives Canada. The archival reference number is R3420, former archival reference number MG28-I453. The fond contains archival material ranging from 1974 to 2003. It includes 11.97 meters of textual records; 2 photographs; and 1 16mm film. These records are important because they help show the history and work of the organization over time.
