= Tremblay v Daigle =

Supreme Court of Canada constitutional case

- Supreme Court of Canada

Hearing: August 8, 1989 Judgment: November 16, 1989
- Full case name: Chantale Daigle v Jean-Guy Tremblay
- Citations: [1989] 2 SCR 530, 1989 CanLII 33, 62 DLR (4th) 634
- Docket No.: 21553
- Prior history: Judgment for Mr. Tremblay in the Quebec Court of Appeal.

Holding
- A fetus does not have a right to life under the Quebec Charter of Human Rights and Freedoms or the Civil Code of Quebec; there is no precedent for a man's right to protect his "potential progeny"

Court membership
- Chief Justice: Brian Dickson; Puisne Justices: Antonio Lamer, Bertha Wilson, Gérard La Forest, Claire L'Heureux-Dubé, John Sopinka, Charles Gonthier, Peter Cory, Beverley McLachlin

Reasons given
- Unanimous reasons by: The Court

Tremblay v Daigle [1989] 2 S.C.R. 530, is a decision of the Supreme Court of Canada in which it was found that a fetus has no legal status in Canada as a person, either in Canadian common law or in Quebec civil law. This, in turn, meant that men, while stating they are protecting fetal rights, cannot acquire injunctions to stop their partners from obtaining abortions in Canada.

== Background ==
By the time the legal controversy began, Canadian abortion law had already been mostly invalidated, as the Therapeutic Abortion Committees were found unconstitutional under section 7 of the Canadian Charter of Rights and Freedoms in R v Morgentaler (1988). That case, however, while finding the committees were unfair to women requiring therapeutic abortions, had not resolved the issue of the status of fetal rights. Tremblay v Daigle thus began with two Quebec individuals named Chantale Daigle and Jean-Guy Tremblay, who were involved in a sexual relationship in 1988 and 1989, with Daigle becoming pregnant in 1989. Tremblay beat Daigle, despite being aware of her pregnancy, and afterwards the relationship came to an end and Daigle developed an interest in obtaining an abortion. Among other things, Daigle cited a desire to raise children in peaceful and stable circumstances, an interest in never seeing Tremblay again, and concern for her own psychological health. In response, Tremblay sought an injunction to halt the abortion, arguing he was protecting the fetus's right to life. Tremblay defended the existence of this fetal right by saying that the fetus is indeed a person.

When the case reached the Supreme Court, Daigle left the province for the United States to terminate the pregnancy. Nevertheless, the issue was considered important enough that the Supreme Court declined to set aside the case for mootness. They went on to give a decision, which was unanimous and which vindicated Daigle.

== Ruling ==
The Court ruled that it was not necessary to deal with the issues of Canadian federalism raised by the appeal; the issue of fetal rights would suffice to solve this particular dispute and prevent similar legal incidents in the future. The fetal rights were said to be anchored in the rights to life in the Canadian Charter, the Quebec Charter of Human Rights and Freedoms, and the Civil Code of Quebec. Moreover, it was argued Tremblay had a right to protect his "potential progeny." The Supreme Court considered and rejected all these arguments. As the Court noted, its role was to consider the fetus's legal status; it would not rule on its biological status, nor would it enter "philosophical and theological debates." As far as the Court could tell, there was no legal precedent for fetal rights under the Quebec Charter, and this Charter is written in "very general terms" and does not specify whether the rights within it were available to fetuses. Although the Charter does say its rights belong to humans, whether the fetus is a human is a merely "linguistic" question that would not solve the issue of what the National Assembly of Quebec actually meant in the Charter. Moreover, if the National Assembly had meant for the Quebec Charter to apply to fetuses, it seemed questionable as to why they would not explicitly state this, rather than leave "the protection of this right in such an uncertain state."

Regarding the Civil Code, the Court considered the argument that since the Code deals with fetuses as "juridical" persons, fetuses must legally be human beings. Human beings, under the Code, have rights. Once again, the Court expressed skepticism as to the nature of the term "human being", noting the linguistic nature of the argument. While the Code does give fetuses some similar treatment to legal persons, the Court replied that this does not necessarily imply other fetal rights exist. In the situations where fetuses are recognized as juridical persons, the Court stated that this is a "fiction of the civil law".

The case next turned to Canadian law and common law. With some historical review, it was noted that while fetuses have usually had some protection under the law, abortion has not usually been viewed as being comparable to murder. Thus, a fetus is not a person under common law. The Court also declined to address the question of fetal rights under the Canadian Charter of Rights and Freedoms, noting that the Charter applies to government; it has no force in legal disputes between private citizens, which was the case in Tremblay v Daigle.

Finally, the Court ruled that there was no precedent for men's rights to protect their "potential progeny."

== Aftermath ==
Some scholars have noted that along with Borowski v Canada (AG) (1989), Tremblay v Daigle "closed off litigation opportunities by anti-abortion opponents" of pro-abortion rights Canadians. Another scholar notes that this case, along with the Saskatchewan Court of Appeal's Borowski decision and the Supreme Court case R v Sullivan (1991), all probably indicate the fetus is not a person under the Canadian Charter. A comparable result to Daigle occurred in 1999 in Dobson (Litigation guardian of) v Dobson.

In 2000, Tremblay was convicted of two counts of assault in the violent beating of his former girlfriend and her close friend which had taken place the year before in Calgary, Alberta. He was sentenced to five years in prison plus a ten-year supervision order. Tremblay sought to appeal the supervision order to the Supreme Court, but the Court decided against hearing his appeal in 2005. At the time it was revealed that he had been convicted of fourteen attacks on women, most of whom were his former girlfriends.

== See also ==
- List of Supreme Court of Canada cases (Dickson Court)
- R v Morgentaler (1993)
- Fetal Rights
