= R v Morgentaler (1993) =

- Supreme Court of Canada

Hearing: February 4, 1993 Judgment: September 30, 1993
- Full case name: Her Majesty The Queen v Henry Morgentaler
- Citations: [1993] 3 S.C.R. 463, 125 N.S.R. (2d) 81, 107 D.L.R. (4th) 537, 85 C.C.C. (3d) 118, 25 C.R. (4th) 179
- Docket No.: 22578
- Prior history: Judgment for the accused in the Nova Scotia Court of Appeal
- Ruling: appeal dismissed

Holding
- Nova Scotia regulations regarding abortion were ultra vires the legislature of the province as criminal law.

Court membership
- Chief Justice: Antonio Lamer; Puisne Justices: Gérard La Forest, Claire L'Heureux-Dubé, John Sopinka, Charles Gonthier, Peter Cory, Beverley McLachlin, Frank Iacobucci, John C. Major

Reasons given
- Unanimous reasons by: Sopinka J.

Laws applied
- Constitution Act, 1867, s. 91(27)

R v Morgentaler is a decision by the Supreme Court of Canada invalidating an attempt by Nova Scotia to restrict access to abortions in that province. This followed the 1988 decision R. v. Morgentaler, which had struck down the federal abortion law as a breach of section 7 of the Canadian Charter of Rights and Freedoms. In 1993, the Supreme Court held that the provincial regulations were a type of criminal law, outside provincial jurisdiction under the Constitution Act, 1867, and therefore invalid. That Act assigns criminal law exclusively to the federal Parliament of Canada.

== Background ==
Having won his case in R v Morgentaler, abortion rights activist Henry Morgentaler planned to open an abortion clinic in Nova Scotia. The provincial government responded by passing legislation that would outlaw such clinics (as a provincial offence) and limit abortions to recognized hospitals. This regulation was not limited to abortion but also covered liposuction and other procedures; indeed, the provincial government stated it was merely fighting the privatization of the health care system (since Morgentaler's clinics were private). The penalty set out in the legislation would be a fine of between $10,000 to $50,000. Undaunted, Morgentaler went ahead and opened his clinic, supposedly to receive potential patients for his other clinics outside Nova Scotia. Eventually, however, Morgentaler informed the press that he had indeed carried out abortions in his Nova Scotia clinic. The government charged him for this, but Morgentaler challenged the constitutionality of the law.

== Ruling ==
Upon receiving the issue, the Supreme Court declined to decide the case on the basis of the Charter and limited itself to the federalism issue. Even here, the Court limited itself by not considering the issue of whether abortion relates to peace, order and good government, which would definitely make it federal jurisdiction. Justice John Sopinka, writing for a unanimous Court, simply agreed with the argument that these specific abortion regulations, rather than being a valid provincial regulation of hospitals and medicine, instead constituted an invalid criminal law. As a result, all of these regulations were struck down, including the ones not dealing with abortion.

The Court began by noting that the legislation was always meant to target specific services, and above all else abortion. In considering the law's pith and substance, this raised the question of whether the provincial government's true motives for enacting the legislation was not to regulate hospitals or medicine, but to limit what it saw as "the socially undesirable conduct of abortion" (which would be a criminal law function). The Court also noted that in Morgentaler v The Queen (1975), it had been found that the abortion law later struck down in 1988 had been criminal law, and as such it had been appropriately passed by Parliament as opposed to by a provincial legislature. This also raised the question of whether abortion laws are designed to deal with "socially undesirable conduct." The Court then quoted Nova Scotia's Hansard, which reinforced the notion that the provincial government saw Morgentaler's clinics as a "public evil which should be eliminated" and minimized the argument that the law had been meant to combat privatization.

The Court observed that the fines were serious penal considerations, a typical feature of criminal law.

The provincial regulations were also ruled to be very similar to the federal abortion law struck down in 1988 (although Nova Scotia did not resurrect the Therapeutic Abortion Committees of the federal law). The similarities were problematic to the provincial law, since similarities between provincial laws and laws in the Criminal Code have, in the past, led to provincial laws being struck down as ultra vires the provincial governments.

== Commentary ==
In his book Constitutional Law of Canada, constitutional scholar Peter Hogg referred to this Morgentaler decision as "remarkable," noting that the regulation of the procedures besides abortion had been struck down after the Court had referred to them as a "smokescreen" for the "true purpose of the legislation." In Hogg's view, the Court had done this under the doctrine of colourability, which holds that a law designed to look like it was enacted within the powers of the relevant legislative body, but in fact attempting to regulate a matter within another level of government's authority, should be struck down. The Court, however, had emphasized pith and substance, and stated that it did not employ the colourability doctrine in this particular case.

== See also ==
- List of Supreme Court of Canada cases (Lamer Court)
