= Henry Morgentaler =

Canadian physician and abortion rights advocate (1923–2013)

Henry Morgentaler CM
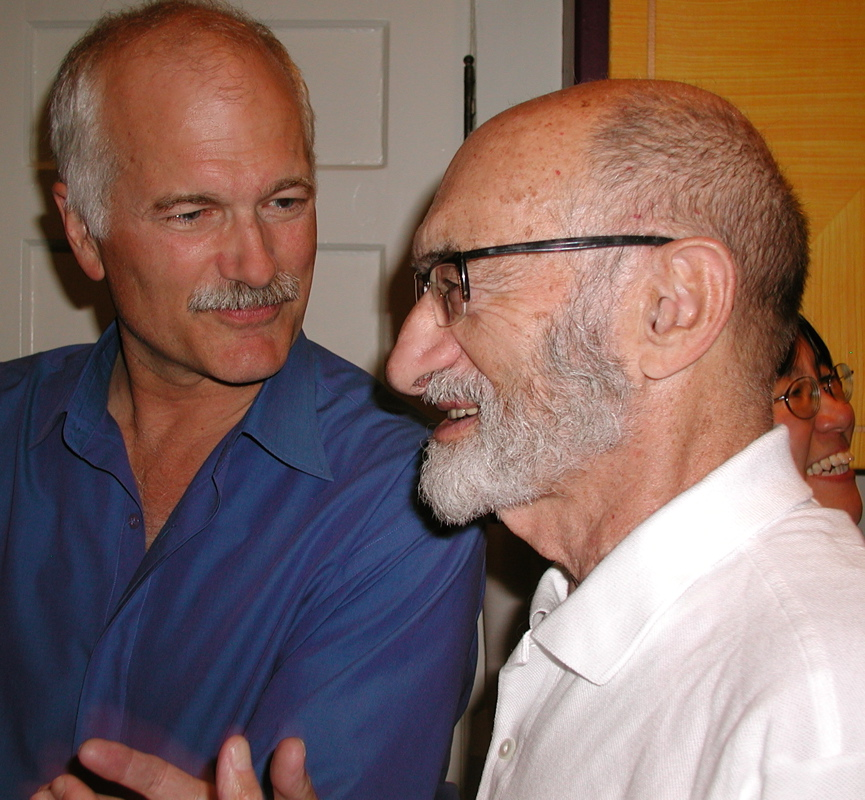
- Henry Morgentaler (right) in August, 2005, with then NDP leader Jack Layton
- Born: Heniek Morgentaler; March 19, 1923; Łódź, Poland
- Died: May 29, 2013 (aged 90); Toronto, Ontario, Canada
- Occupations: Doctor, activist
- Known for: abortion rights advocacy
- Spouse: Chava Rosenfarb (m. 1945–1975)
- Children: 2

Henekh "Henry" Morgentaler CM (March 19, 1923 – May 29, 2013) was a Polish-born Canadian physician and abortion rights advocate who fought numerous legal battles aimed at expanding abortion rights in Canada. As a Jewish youth during World War II, Morgentaler was imprisoned at the Łódź Ghetto and later at the Dachau concentration camp.

After the war, Morgentaler migrated to Canada and entered medical practice, becoming one of the first Canadian doctors to perform vasectomies, to insert intrauterine devices, and to provide birth control pills to unmarried women. He opened his first abortion clinic in 1969 in Montreal, challenging what he saw as an unjust law placing burdensome restrictions on women seeking abortions. He was the first doctor in North America to use vacuum aspiration and went on to open twenty clinics and train more than one hundred doctors. Morgentaler was jailed in 1975 for defying abortion law when the Quebec Court of Appeal overturned a jury's acquittal. The resulting Morgentaler Amendment to the Criminal Code restricted appeal courts from overturning acquittals. Morgentaler twice challenged the constitutionality of the federal abortion law, losing the first time, in Morgentaler v The Queen in 1975, but winning the second time, in R v Morgentaler in 1988.

In 2008, Morgentaler was awarded the Order of Canada "for his commitment to increased health care options for women, his determined efforts to influence Canadian public policy and his leadership in humanist and civil liberties organizations." Morgentaler died at the age of 90 of a heart attack.

== Life ==
Morgentaler was born in Łódź, Poland, about 120 kilometres (75 mi) southwest of Warsaw, to Josef and Golda Morgentaler. Before World War II, Morgentaler's father was active in the General Jewish Labour Bund in Poland. During the German occupation of Poland, a Jewish ghetto in Łódź was created and Jews were not allowed to leave it. Morgentaler's father was killed by the Gestapo, while Henry lived with his mother and younger brother in the Ghetto Litzmannstadt with 164,000 others. His sister had left for Warsaw with her husband before the start of the war. She was incarcerated there at the Warsaw Ghetto, and took part in the Warsaw Ghetto Uprising. She was killed at the Treblinka extermination camp.

When the Germans raided the Ghetto in Łódź with the help of the Jewish Ghetto Police, the Rosenfarbs and the Morgentalers (Golda and her sons Henry and Abraham) along with two other families hid in a room with the door concealed by a wardrobe. After two days in hiding, on August 23, 1944, they were found and deported to Auschwitz concentration camp. The boys never saw their mother again: Golda was murdered at Auschwitz. On August 27, Henry and Abraham were shipped to KL Landsberg, Dachau concentration camp, where they both remained until the end of the war. In February 1945, Henry was sent to KL Kaufering (a satellite camp of Dachau concentration camp). By the end of the war, he was in sick bay (Krankenrevier), whence he was finally liberated by the U.S. Army on April 29, 1945. After his release at age 22 Henry weighed just 32 kilograms (71 lb). He entered a Displaced Persons Hospital in Landsberg am Lech. After a few months there he was moved to a DP Hospital in St. Ottilien, and thence with Abraham to Feldafing, a Displaced Persons Camp, in Bavaria.

=== After the war ===
In 1946, Abraham emigrated to the United States. In 1947, Henry made his way to Brussels in Belgium, where he rejoined his friends the Rosenfarbs. Because they were not in Belgium legally, he and his fiancée, Chava Rosenfarb, were required to emigrate. Chava's sister, Henia Reinhartz, in her Memoir, "Bits and Pieces," described the harsh economic conditions while the family, and Henry, lived in Brussels. One picture shows Henia, Chava, and their mother wearing coats made from blankets donated by UNRRA. In 1949, Henry and Chava married. They left Europe in February 1950 on the RMS Samaria (1920) sailing to Canada.

The couple settled in Montreal, where Chava resumed her vocation as a writer. Several months later their first child, Goldie, was born. Their second child was a son, Abraham. Henry was, by his own admission, a proud womanizer. Their marriage ended in divorce in the mid-1970s. Chava died on January 30, 2011.

== Career ==
Morgentaler received his medical education from the Université de Montréal, graduating in 1953. After receiving his Canadian citizenship, he practised medicine in the east end of Montreal. He started as a general practitioner in 1955 but increasingly specialized in family planning, becoming one of the first Canadian doctors to perform vasectomies, to insert intra-uterine devices, and to provide birth control pills to unmarried women.

On October 17, 1967, he presented a brief on behalf of the Humanist Association of Canada before a House of Commons Health and Welfare Committee that was investigating the issue of illegal abortion. Morgentaler stated that women should have the right to safe abortion. The reaction to his public testimony surprised him: he began to receive calls from women who wanted abortions. Robert Malcolm Campbell and Leslie Alexander Pal wrote, "Henry Morgentaler experienced the [abortion] law's limitations directly in the supplications of desperate women who visited his Montreal office." Morgentaler's initial response was to refuse:

"I hadn't expected the avalanche of requests and didn't realize the magnitude of the problem in immediate, human terms. I answered, 'I sympathize with you. I know your problem, but the law won't let me help you. If I do help you, I'll go to jail, I lose my practice—I have a wife and two children. I'm sorry, but I just can't!'"

For a time he was able to refer the women to two other doctors who did abortions, but they became unavailable. There was no one to whom he could send them, and some of them were ending up in the emergency department after amateur abortions. He has said that he felt like a coward for sending them away and that he was shirking his responsibility. Eventually, in spite of the risks to himself—loss of career, a prison term for years or for life—he decided to perform abortions and, at the same time, challenge the law. He knew from other doctors and from newspaper reports that women in Montreal had died from incompetently performed abortions. He knew that the women were determined to get abortions in spite of the danger to their health and lives. He knew that he could prevent those unnecessary deaths, so he determined to use civil disobedience to change the law.

In 1968, Morgentaler gave up his family practice and began performing abortions in his private clinic. He devoted his clinic to performing abortions on women as well as providing birth control and contraceptives, though it was illegal at the time. At the time, abortion was illegal except for cases in which continuing a pregnancy threatened the life of the pregnant woman. On August 26, 1969, an amendment to the Criminal Code legalized abortion in Canada if performed in a hospital after approval of a Therapeutic Abortion Committee. There was, however, no requirement for a hospital to set up a committee and only about one-third of hospitals did. This left many areas without legal abortion, forcing women to travel and inducing barriers and delays. Some committees never met. Even if they did, they never saw their "patient" and yet her fate was determined by their subjective opinions. In addition, there was no appeal of a TAC's decision. Morgentaler's abortions remained illegal under the new law because he did not submit them in advance to a TAC for approval; they became legal in 1988, when section 251 of the Criminal Code (now known as section 287) was found to be unconstitutional by the Supreme Court of Canada.

In 1983, Morgentaler debated former abortion doctor Bernard Nathanson for an hour on a Canadian national superstation.

After Quebec stopped prosecuting him in 1976, Morgentaler opened an abortion clinic in Ontario. In spite of prosecutions, other provinces followed. In 2003, he was able to close his Halifax clinics because a doctor that he trained was now performing abortions at a local hospital, QEII Health Sciences Centre.

In 2006, Morgentaler had to stop performing abortions after undergoing a heart bypass surgery. He continued, however, to oversee the operation of his six private clinics.

== Judicial battles ==
=== Quebec ===
In 1969, Morgentaler opened an abortion clinic in Montreal. He said that he applied for status as a model abortion clinic and proposed to the federal and provincial governments that abortions could be safely done outside hospitals. He recounts that neither the provincial nor the federal government showed any interest. Each said it was the other's responsibility. No one came to inspect the clinic. Instead, they sent the police. On June 1, 1970, Montreal city police raided Morgentaler's clinic and laid several charges of performing illegal abortions. The first case did not come to trial until 1973; in the meantime, women's groups organized in support of Morgentaler and he continued to perform abortions. In 1973, he stated that he had performed 5,000 safe abortions outside hospitals, demonstrating that a hospital setting was not necessary.

Between 1973 and 1975, Morgentaler was tried three times in Montreal for defying the abortion law; each time, he raised the defence of necessity, and each time, he was acquitted on that defence despite having acted against the abortion law. In each successive case, the juries took less time to reach their decision to acquit: at the third trial, they took one hour. When juries are refusing to enforce a law that they perceive as unjust, it is called jury nullification.

Each charge was brought to trial separately. At the trial of the first charge in 1973, Morgentaler was defended by Claude-Armand Sheppard. Sheppard presented the "defence of necessity"—as a doctor, Morgentaler had a duty to safeguard the life and health of the women who came to him for abortions, which outweighed his duty to obey the law. After hearing some of those women as witnesses, the jury acquitted him.

The province appealed the acquittal. The jury's acquittal was overturned by five judges on the Quebec Court of Appeal in 1974, who substituted a conviction. The doctor appealed his conviction to the Supreme Court of Canada, but the court upheld his conviction in a 6–3 decision, stating that the danger to women was not immediate. He was sentenced to 18 months in prison and began serving his sentence in March 1975.

In 1975, under Liberal Prime Minister Pierre Trudeau, the Canadian Parliament changed the law so that an appeals court could not overturn a jury acquittal, although they could order a new trial. This is known as the Morgentaler Amendment to the Criminal Code. The Quebec government set aside their first conviction and ordered a new trial on the first charge. Morgentaler was released to await trial.

In 1975, while he was in prison, the Ministry of Justice for Quebec laid a second set of charges against him and he was acquitted by another jury. He was, however, already in jail. A political cartoon at the time showed a prison guard pushing a food tray into Morgentaler's cell and saying, "Congratulations, doctor, you've been acquitted again!" The Ministry of Justice appealed this second acquittal but this time, the Quebec Court of Appeal unanimously upheld the acquittal (January 19, 1976).

Morgentaler was not released on parole after serving one-third of his sentence, six months. In total, he served ten months, suffering a heart attack while in solitary confinement, after which he was released to hospital. It was reported that the Liberal Justice Minister for Quebec, Jérôme Choquette, was deeply involved and interested in prosecuting Morgentaler until he was removed from the portfolio.

In January 1976, a third trial was begun against Morgentaler on the first set of charges. On 18 September 1976, the trial ended in an acquittal by a different jury. This was his third jury acquittal in Quebec.

The 1976 Quebec general election brought the Parti Québécois into power. They realized that the abortion law could not be enforced if juries would not convict, so they dropped the remaining charges. On December 11, 1976, the new Justice Minister, Marc-André Bédard, dropped the charges against Morgentaler and other doctors and announced that there would be no further trials for clinic abortions in Quebec. The announcement was just in time to prevent a fourth Morgentaler trial from starting the following Monday.

Bédard called the anti-abortion law unenforceable. From that point on, Quebec refused to enforce federal law prohibiting abortions by qualified medical personnel. Bédard emphasized that police would continue to identify and charge unqualified, back-street abortionists. Federal Justice Minister Ron Basford said that Quebec had made a just and fair decision that was proper to the provincial authority. Quebec Justice Minister Bédard asked Federal Justice Minister Basford to amend Section 251 of the Criminal Code.

Later in 1976, the Attorney General for Quebec announced that thenceforward abortions performed by doctors in free-standing clinics were legal in the province.

In 1976, Morgentaler went to the Supreme Court of Canada in an attempt to overturn the country's abortion law in Morgentaler v The Queen but was unsuccessful. In 1982, the Canadian Charter of Rights and Freedoms was enacted as part of the Canadian Constitution. The Charter was relevant to Morgentaler's later court cases.

=== CARAL ===
In 1974, a group of abortion rights activists founded the Canadian Association for the Repeal of the Abortion Law (CARAL) in Ottawa. The aim of CARAL was to support Morgentaler's challenge of the 1969 abortion law requiring approval of a Therapeutic Abortion Committee (TAC) before an abortion could be legally performed (without requiring TACs to be formed or to meet). The organization formed provincial and local chapters across Canada and helped to raise funds for Morgentaler's legal fees. The group also supported Morgentaler's use of vacuum aspiration under local anesthetic as safer and less invasive than the dilation and curettage (D&C) that was traditionally performed at hospitals for abortions or after miscarriages. The development of medical abortion has also reduced maternal mortality associated with non-medically assisted abortions.

=== Other provinces and Canada ===
Encouraged by public support for his struggle and concern about women's access to abortion in other provinces, in 1983 Morgentaler decided to challenge the law in other provinces. He spent the next 15 years opening and running abortion clinics across Canada, in clear violation of the law. In each province, he announced in advance that he would open a clinic. That year, he opened clinics in Winnipeg and Toronto.

By this point, the tide of public opinion had turned in Morgentaler's favour: A Gallup poll in 1983 showed that 72% of Canadians believed that the decision to abort should rest solely with a pregnant woman and her doctor.

The Toronto clinic was operated with two colleagues, Leslie Frank Smoling and Robert Scott. In 1983, Toronto Police raided Morgentaler's newly opened clinic and he and his two colleagues were charged with providing illegal miscarriages. Once again Morgentaler used the defence of necessity and was acquitted by the jury. The Attorney General's office appealed the acquittal and the verdict was reversed by the Court of Appeal for Ontario, which directed a new trial. Once again, an appeal court had overturned a jury acquittal. Once again, Morgentaler appealed to the Supreme Court of Canada. This time, Morgentaler challenged the law as unconstitutional on the grounds that it denied women the right to life, liberty, and security of the person. At all levels (jury trial, Court of Appeal, Supreme Court), Morgentaler was represented by Ontario constitutional lawyer Morris Manning.

The appeal case, R v. Morgentaler, 1988, was heard by the Supreme Court of Canada. It was a victory for Morgentaler. The court upheld the original jury acquittal. In addition, it declared that the 1969 abortion law violated the Canadian Charter of Rights and Freedoms and was thus unconstitutional in the case of R. v. Morgentaler 1988 (1 S.C.R. 30). The court ruled 5–2 that the administrative procedures were cumbersome and unjustifiably interfered with the body integrity of women." On January 28, the law was found to violate Section 7 of the Charter of Rights and Freedoms because it infringes upon a woman's right to "life, liberty and security of the person."

The five justices wrote three different opinions striking down the law for different reasons: that Section 251 imposed unnecessary procedures and restrictions, restricted access to hospitals, and caused delays; resulted in physical, psychological and emotional risk to the woman; and forced some women to carry a fetus to term against their will.

Chief Justice Brian Dickson wrote:

"Forcing a woman, by threat of criminal sanction, to carry a fetus to term unless she meets certain criteria unrelated to her own priorities and aspirations, is a profound interference with a woman's body and thus a violation of her security of the person."

Justice Bertha Wilson wrote:

"The decision of a woman to terminate her pregnancy falls within the class of protected decisions [because it will have] profound psychological, economic and social consequences for the pregnant woman ... The right to reproduce or not to reproduce ... is properly perceived as an integral part of modern woman's struggle to assert her dignity and worth as a human being ... The purpose of [section 251] is to take the decision away from the woman and give it to a committee."

Thus the court concurred with Morgentaler's reasoning. The Supreme Court ruling essentially ended all criminal restrictions that singled out abortion in Canada for special treatment, leaving it to be governed by Canada's laws concerning medical practice. The Canada Health Act, provincial medical regulations, and health insurance restrictions still applied. In particular, provinces could refuse to pay for clinic abortions; but they could not demand that TACs be used to screen the procedures for approval, nor could they forbid abortion outright. Morgentaler has described this as the happiest day of his life.

The courts also reviewed various attempts by provinces and municipalities to use laws about medical services to restrict or hamper the ability of pregnant women to exercise a right of choice. All such attempts were denied by the courts. Anti-abortion forces resorted to political attempts to deny funding to private abortion clinics and to ban the establishment of clinics within provinces.

In 1989, Nova Scotia took one day to pass a law that banned abortions and some other procedures such as liposuction outside hospitals, making all clinic abortions illegal or at least unfunded. Morgentaler opened a clinic, supposedly to interview clients for abortions outside the province. Then he announced that he had performed abortions there. The government laid a charge of violating the Nova Scotia Medical Services Act, 1989. Nova Scotia then sought an injunction to stop Morgentaler from performing clinic abortions. The injunction was granted on the ground that there was an overwhelming need to ensure that provincial laws are respected. It rejected the argument that the Supreme Court's 1988 decision in R. v. Morgentaler prohibited provinces from passing laws that simply made clinic abortions illegal.

To fight the charges and the injunction, Morgentaler challenged the constitutionality of the Nova Scotia Medical Services Act. In 1993, the case came before the Supreme Court of Canada. The province argued that it was combating the privatization of health services. The court, however, unanimously struck down that part of the Act that forbade procedures in clinics. Justice John Sopinka wrote the decision, which agreed that these abortion regulations were not a valid provincial regulation of hospitals and medicine, but an invalid criminal law: only the federal government can make criminal law. As a result, all of the regulations were struck down, including the ones not dealing with abortion, which the court called a smokescreen for the province's true purpose of stopping women from having abortions. (See R. v. Morgentaler (1993).)

In June 1991, the Ontario government announced that all abortions in the province, including clinic abortions, would be covered by the Ontario Health Insurance Plan. Women would not have to pay out of pocket for clinic abortions, as they did in other provinces. The Ontario Ministry of Health announced that they would be working with the medical profession to ensure that enough doctors were trained and would perform abortions to keep up with the demand from Ontario women.

In 1994 New Brunswick banned abortions in clinics outside hospitals. In 1995 abortion was added to the Canada Health Act as an essential medical service, meaning that it must be covered by health insurance. Nevertheless, some provinces do not cover clinic abortions.

In 1995, provincial and federal rulings forced Nova Scotia and New Brunswick to allow private abortion clinics. The Alberta government was penalized under the Canada Health Act for not funding abortions in clinics, but instead allowing private billing at provincial abortion clinics. In 1996 Alberta gave in to the financial pressure and agreed to fund the clinics.

In 1996, Morgentaler wrote "The Moral Case for Abortion." In it, he gives the reasoning that guided his actions from the first abortions in Quebec and fuelled his defence of necessity in providing women with abortions. This was, in essence, the reason that Quebec juries would not convict him:

Have all these people forgotten that women used to die in our countries from self-induced or quack abortions, that unwanted children were given away to institutions where they suffered enormous trauma that took the joy of life away from them and made them into anxious, depressed individuals with a grudge against society? Have all these people forgotten that an unwanted pregnancy was the biggest health hazard to young fertile women and could result in loss of fertility, long-term illness, injury, and death?

While no precise figures exist, it is estimated that approximately 4,000 to 6,000 Canadian women died from illegal abortions between 1926 and 1947. This lesson was reinforced in 1990 by the Progressive Conservative government's attempt to recriminalize abortion. The federal government, led by Progressive Conservative Prime Minister Brian Mulroney, introduced Bill C-43, which would punish doctors with prison terms if they performed abortions for women whose health was not at risk. It passed the House of Commons by a close vote of 140–131 in a blaze of publicity. It was not yet law, but within a week a 20-year-old university student bled to death in residence from a self-induced coat hanger abortion. A teenage girl was injured in a botched back-alley abortion. These casualties of unwanted pregnancy received considerable publicity and abortion rights demonstrations were held after the death of the student, protesting Bill C-43. The bill was defeated in the Senate by a tie vote in early 1991 and the casualties of illegal abortion ceased.

Morgentaler's final legal battles focused on obtaining universal public funding for abortions, by gaining recognition that a well-regulated specialist clinic provides a service equivalent to that offered in a hospital. In New Brunswick and Prince Edward Island, for example, the provincial health care system paid for abortions only if they were performed at authorized hospitals and approved by two physicians. Morgentaler challenged this policy in New Brunswick.

In 2008, the challenge was before the courts. The province originally stated that women could get medically necessary abortions at New Brunswick hospitals. In 2006 however the last hospital in New Brunswick to perform publicly funded abortions, the Dr. Everett Chalmers Hospital in Fredericton, announced that it would suspend abortion services as of July 1, citing workload problems. New Brunswick and Prince Edward Island are the only provinces in Canada that refuse to pay for abortions in clinics. This rule violates the Canada Health Act as well as the 1988 Supreme Court Morgentaler Decision. The province argued that Morgentaler could not have standing because only a woman who needed to use the clinic had the right to challenge abortion policy. The New Brunswick Court of Queen's Bench ruled that Morgentaler had standing to proceed with a lawsuit against the government. That leaves the Morgentaler clinic in Fredericton, where women can obtain abortions by paying up to $750.

Judge Paulette Garnett said that Morgentaler should have legal standing to proceed with the lawsuit because the personal nature of abortions – and the fact the procedures are time-sensitive – make it difficult for women to take the government before the courts. After the ruling, the government considered whether it should appeal.

In 2009, Morgentaler was working to open two private abortion clinics in the Canadian Arctic so that women who live there do not have to travel vast distances to obtain abortions.

== Death threats, assaults, and bombings ==
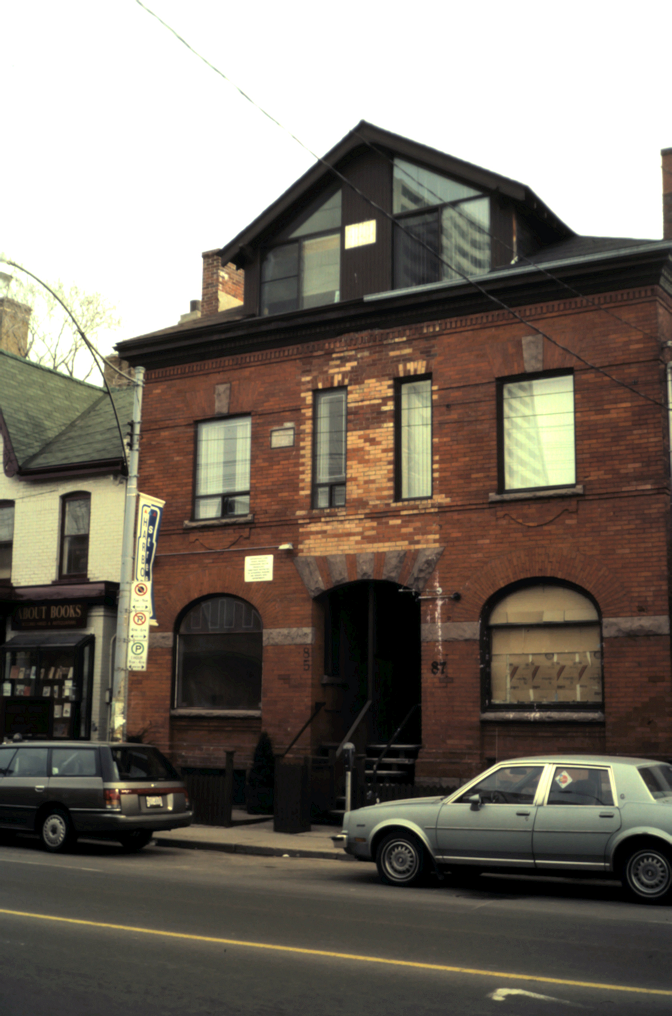
Henry Morgentaler's abortion clinic on Harbord Street in Toronto, 1991

There were many instances of anti-abortion violence against Morgentaler, his staff, his patients, and his colleagues. Anti-abortion violence is described by the Canadian Security Intelligence Service as single-issue terrorism. Death threats against Morgentaler were frequent. In the 1980s, a reporter said that the stack of death threats for a single month was six inches (roughly 15 cm) thick.

In 1983, a man attacked Morgentaler with garden shears outside of his Toronto abortion clinic. Judy Rebick blocked the attack and Morgentaler remained unharmed. Augusto Dantas was charged with assault and with possession of a weapon dangerous to the public good. On July 29, 1983, protesters firebombed his clinic; the clinic suffered only minor damage, but the neighbouring Toronto Women's Bookstore was nearly destroyed.

In May 1992, the Morgentaler Clinic on Harbord Street in Toronto was again firebombed during the night by two people (caught on security camera), using gasoline as fuel and a firework to set off the explosion. The next day, clinic management announced that the firebombing failed to prevent any abortions since all scheduled abortions were carried out in alternative locations. No one was hurt but the building had to be demolished. The Women's Bookstore next door was also damaged. As a result of the arson, the Ontario government decided to spend $420,000 on improved security for abortion clinics. At the time, all four free-standing clinics in Ontario were in Toronto. The government wanted to gather information about activities by anti-abortion sympathizers; at the time, law enforcement agencies in Canada did not collect statistics about harassment and violence against abortion providers, their clinics, or their clients.

After sniper attacks on other doctors such as Garson Romalis and Hugh Short, abortion providers in Canada were aware that their own lives could be in danger from anti-abortion assassins with high-powered rifles.

The murder of Barnett Slepian in Buffalo on October 23, 1998, also by a high-powered rifle, reinforced the threats. Abortion doctors wore bullet-proof vests and pulled their curtains to prevent assassins from shooting into their homes. Morgentaler was quoted as saying, "I know of anecdotal evidence that some doctors are considering that they might not be able to continue. It's a very bad situation." He said that he would go on performing abortions. Morgentaler believed that the attacker was an American and that the attacks were an unwanted byproduct of the vitriolic, religiously fuelled abortion battle in the United States. He stated, "In Canada, you have fewer religious fanatics, there is much less violence in Canada and it's a much more tolerant society."

In response to the stabbing of Garson Romalis in 2000, Morgentaler said that some doctors in Ontario, New Brunswick, and Newfoundland had stopped doing abortions. "For years, we have been living in the shadow of the doctors being killed", said Morgentaler. "This violence is a sign of frustration, rage and moral bankruptcy in the anti-abortion movement."

== Other legal troubles ==
In 1976, the Disciplinary Committee of the Professional Corporation of Physicians of Quebec suspended Morgentaler's medical licence for a year as a result of his conviction for having performed an illegal abortion. As he operated outside hospitals and without a Therapeutic Abortion Committee, all his abortions were illegal. According to Catherine Dunphy's 1996 biography of Morgentaler, the committee "commented on 'an attitude which is primarily directed to protecting his fees. No really valid interview is held before proceeding with the abortion. This behaviour confers a mercenary character in the doctor-patient relationship. This committee is incapable of reconciling this behaviour with the humanitarian concern that the accused invoked throughout his defence'."

The Montreal Gazette reported in 1974 that, according to police evidence, Morgentaler was re-using disposable vacurettes, against the manufacturer's instructions which stated that they "cannot be re-used". The Gazette reported that when contacted, Morgentaler stated that earlier model Vacurettes "could occasionally be used more than once", but he insisted that "whether someone uses a Vacurette once or twice has nothing to do with practising good medicine". A 1991 Alberta Report article reports that he now denied having re-used vacurettes, but it also reported that according to The Gazette's lawyers, Morgentaler never took any legal action against that paper.

In 1973, on the basis of Morgentaler's public statements that he had performed thousands of abortions, the Quebec Ministry of Revenue ordered him to pay $354,799 in unpaid income taxes. Morgentaler settled out of court a few years later, paying $101,000.

== Honours and awards ==
Morgentaler was the first president of the Humanist Association of Canada (HAC) from 1968 to 1999. He remained the organization's honorary president until his death in 2013. The HAC bestowed on him its Lifetime Achievement Award on August 3, 2008, in Toronto, Ontario, during its 40th-anniversary celebration convention, the largest Humanist convention in the nation's history.

In 1973, Morgentaler was one of the signers of the second Humanist Manifesto. The American Humanist Association named him the 1975 Humanist of the Year, along with Betty Friedan, author of The Feminine Mystique.

In 1989, Morgentaler received the "Maggie" Award, the highest honour of the Planned Parenthood Federation, in tribute to their founder, Margaret Sanger.

On June 16, 2005, the University of Western Ontario conferred an honorary Doctor of Laws degree upon Morgentaler; this was his first honorary degree. This decision by UWO's senate honorary degrees committee generated opposition from Canadian anti-abortion organizations. 12,000 signatures were acquired on a petition asking the UWO to reverse its decision to honour Morgentaler and several protest rallies were held, including one on the day the honorary degree was bestowed. A counter-petition, supporting the UWO's decision, gained over 10,000 signatures.

On August 5, 2005, Morgentaler received the Couchiching Award for Public Policy Leadership for his efforts on behalf of women's rights and reproductive health issues. The Award was given by the Couchiching Institute on Public Affairs at its 74th annual summer conference. The Couchiching Award for Public Policy Leadership is presented annually to a nationally recognised Canadian who has demonstrated public policy leadership that results in a positive impact on Canada or a community within Canada, often in the face of public opposition. In part, the citation reads

The women's movement of the 1960s found in Dr. Morgentaler a person who understood that women's equality could not be achieved within the existing restrictions on medical services for reproductive choice. In offering women access to necessary services that faced considerable restriction elsewhere, Dr. Morgentaler used both his professional status and personal skills to fight for women's rights, while placing himself at risk. His actions have brought about fundamental changes in Canadian law and to the health care system and in so doing dramatically affected for the better the lives of Canadians from coast to coast.

The Canadian Labour Congress recognized him on May 28, 2008, with its highest honour, the Award for Outstanding Service to Humanity. The CLC's description reads

Morgentaler, 85 and frail, accepted the award from the Officers of the Canadian Labour Congress and thanked the unions for standing with him through his many years of struggle to secure for women the right to control their own health and their own bodies. Choice and freedom.

On this occasion, Morgentaler said, "We must remain vigilant in defence of a woman's right to choose because there are still too many legislators and health care providers out there who are not pro-choice and too many women who continue to have their health put at risk because they are denied access to safe abortion services in a supportive environment – twenty years after Canada's abortion laws were struck down."

In 2010, Morgentaler was nominated for a Transformational Canadians award as a person who has "made a difference by immeasurably improving the lives of others." The news item says, "In Canada, a woman can have an abortion without fear of prosecution or imprisonment – for the simple reason that there is no abortion law. For more than 20 years, that state of affairs has set us apart from the rest of the developed world. Canadian women enjoy the right to safe and legal abortions largely because Henry Morgentaler fought a long battle on their behalf. For his trouble, the unflappable Dr. Morgentaler stood trial, languished in prison, and received numerous death threats. What drove him to take such risks? "The realization that a terrible injustice was being done to women and the conviction that it was necessary to change the situation to provide help for those who needed it," replies the retired physician via email."

=== Order of Canada ===
Morgentaler was named a Member of the Order of Canada on July 1, 2008; he was recognized "for his commitment to increased health care options for women, his determined efforts to influence Canadian public policy and his leadership in humanist and civil liberties organizations." Abortion-rights activists applauded the decision, saying Morgentaler put his life and liberty on the line to advance women's rights, while anti-abortion groups strongly criticized the award, saying it debased the Order of Canada. Feminist and author Judy Rebick told The Globe and Mail that it was time Morgentaler was honoured for his long battle; she said "Dr. Morgentaler is a hero to millions of women in the country," she said. "He risked his life to struggle for women's rights ... He's a huge figure in Canadian history and the fact that he hasn't got [the Order of Canada] until now is a scandal."

On the matter, Prime Minister Stephen Harper said he would rather see the country's then highest civilian award "be something that really unifies" and "brings Canadians together", while Liberal Party leader Stéphane Dion said, "Dr. Morgentaler has stood up for a woman's right to choose for his entire career, often at great personal risk", and asked Canadians to respect and celebrate the decision.

Several members of the order said they would return their insigniae to Rideau Hall in protest, including Roman Catholic priest Lucien Larré; Gilbert Finn, former Lieutenant Governor of New Brunswick; Frank Chauvin, a retired police detective who founded an orphanage; and the Madonna House Apostolate on behalf of the late Catherine Doherty. Also in 2008, Canadian bishops unanimously stated that they were opposed to the appointment of the abortion provider and pro-choice advocate Henry Morgentaler to the Order of Canada, directly quoting from the Compendium of Social Doctrine. Moreover, the bishops generally advocate pro-life views through the Catholic Organization for Life and Family, the official episcopal agency dedicated to life issues.

On June 1, 2009, three members did leave the order in protest against Morgentaler's admission, including the Archbishop of Montreal, Cardinal Jean-Claude Turcotte. Turcotte explained his resignation to the CBC, saying, "I'm worried about how we treat life, from conception to death. I decided to take a stance that clearly reflects my convictions." The others were astronomer René Racine and pianist and conductor Jacqueline Richard, both from Montreal. In November 2009, engineer Renato Giuseppe Bosisio also resigned his membership in protest. About a dozen people picketed outside the ceremony in Quebec City.

== Other activities ==
Morgentaler's campaign for women's reproductive health took him across Canada on speaking engagements and fund-raising tours to promote family planning. In 1972, Morgentaler ran in the Federal Election in the riding of Saint-Denis as an independent, finishing fourth with 1,509 votes. In 1999, Morgentaler said that a decline in youth crime rates could be credited to the legalization of abortion nearly twenty years earlier, leading to fewer neglected and angry children and more mothers surviving to nurture their children. In 2006, Morgentaler retired from active practice.

In August 2011, Morgentaler attended the funeral of Opposition Leader Jack Layton, leader of the New Democratic Party. In the 1980s, Layton attended clinic defences of the Morgentaler clinics, when abortion rights supporters guarded the entrance of a clinic to keep abortion opponents from blockading the doorways to stop patients from entering. The NDP has been a supporter of abortion rights, making them part of its political platform for many years.

In 1991, he debated William Lane Craig in a debate 'Humanism vs Christianity'.

== Media and cultural representations ==
Morgentaler was the subject of a 1984 National Film Board of Canada documentary Democracy on Trial: The Morgentaler Affair, directed by Paul Cowan.

His ex-wife, Yiddish author Chava Rosenfarb, immortalized him as David, one of the protagonists of her Holocaust-era three-volume saga The Tree of Life.

In 2005, the CTV television network produced a television movie documenting Morgentaler's life and practice called Choice: The Henry Morgentaler Story. The movie is described thus: "It chronicles how the physician defiantly began his fight for women's reproductive rights in 1967, even serving time in a Quebec prison in 1975 on abortion charges. The story culminates with the Supreme Court of Canada deciding to strike down this country's abortion laws in 1988." In an interview with CTV, Morgentaler explains: "I got involved because this was, for me, a fight for justice, for fundamental justice, and the fact that I could possibly do something to help women in spite of a law which did not allow me to do it." "I was willing to go to jail, I was willing to die for it," he told CTV's Canada AM Wednesday. "So when I look back on it, I look at a life of achievement because I achieved a great deal and I'm very proud of it."

A famous Montreal Gazette editorial cartoon by Terry Mosher lampooned Montreal Mayor Jean Drapeau's prediction that "the Montreal Olympics can no more have a deficit, than a man can have a baby." After the financially disastrous 1976 Summer Olympics, he drew a cartoon of a pregnant Drapeau placing a telephone call to Morgentaler.

The alternative rock band Me Mom and Morgentaler used the doctor as the inspiration for its name.

A vandalized name plate from the Toronto Morgentaler Clinic is kept in the Canadian Women's Movement Archives (CWMA) at the University of Ottawa Library's Archives and Special Collections.
