= Frank Chauvin =

Canadian police detective

Francis Chauvin (November 18, 1933 - March 13, 2015) was a Canadian police detective from Windsor, Ontario. He is best known for resigning from the Order of Canada in protest at the appointment of Henry Morgentaler to the Order in 2009. He retired from the Windsor Police Service in 1988.

== Charity work ==
Chauvin began his charitable work with Holy Name of Mary Food Fund in the 1970s.

In 1988, motivated by seeing a mother and her severely sick child during a trip to Port-au-Prince, Chauvin established Foyer des Filles de Dieu, the home of God's daughters, an orphanage and clinic in Haiti for orphaned and abandoned girls between the ages of 18 months and 18 years. The facility is supported by tens of thousands of dollars in donations annually, mostly from Windsor and Essex County. During the 2010 Haiti earthquake, four died at Foyer des Filles de Dieu.

He has been deeply involved with Madonna House and Canadian Food for Children.

== Personal life ==
Chauvin and his wife, Lorraine, had 10 children and have sponsored refugees. He died at the age of 81 at his home in Windsor on March 13, 2015, of lung cancer and chronic obstructive pulmonary disease (COPD).

In 2007, he swayed Windsor's city council to unanimously designate St. Rose Church a heritage building.

== Accolades ==
In 1987, he was awarded the Order of Canada. He would later rescind it in 2009, protesting Henry Morgentaler's appointment to the Order.

In 2009, he was awarded the Benemerenti medal.

In 2009, he was awarded the Catholic Civil Rights League's Archbishop Adam Exner Award for Catholic Excellence in Public Life.
