= Renato Giuseppe Bosisio =

Canadian academic

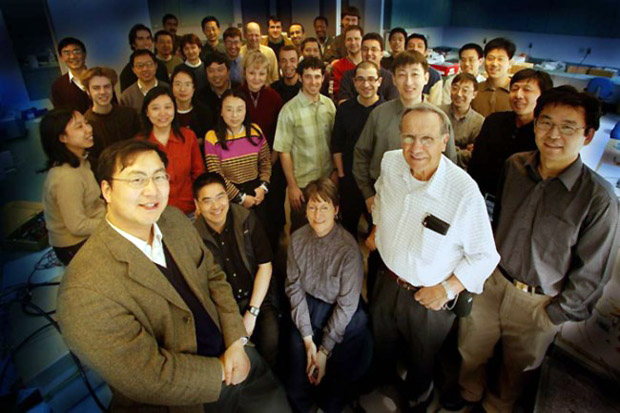
- Dr. Bosisio, with the members of the Poly-GRAMES research center, seen in the front middle-right wearing a white shirt
- Born: Monza, Italy
- Died: February 3, 2019 (aged 88–89)
- Education: McGill University (BS); University of Florida (MS)
- Known for: Microwave engineering
- Scientific career
- Workplaces: Polytechnique Montréal; Department of National Defence (Canada)

Dr. Renato Giuseppe Bosisio (1930–2019) was a Québécois Canadian academic and expert on microwave engineering. He is also known for returning the Order of Canada in protest of Henry Morgentaler's appointment to the Order.

== Positions ==
Bosisio is a professor emeritus at the École Polytechnique de Montréal, Department of Electrical Engineering.

== Notability ==
Bosisio has authored and/or coauthor over 300 academic papers and refereed international conferences. In them, he has made global contributions in developing microwave and millimeter wave engineering. He also holds 12 patents.

In 1992, he founded the Poly-GRAMES Research Center.

== Accolades ==
On January 14, 2002, Bosisio was appointed to the Order of Canada. On November 30, 2009, he resigned in protest of Henry Morgentaler's appointment to the Order.

On May 3, 2004, Bosisio was awarded the McNaughton Medal of IEEE Canada Outstanding Educator Award for "research and teaching of microwaves and innovation of six-port based digital receivers" in 2004.
