= Criminal Law Amendment Act, 1968–69 =

Act of Parliament of Canada modifying the Criminal Code

Parliament of Canada
- Citation: S.C. 1968–69, c. 38
- Enacted by: Parliament of Canada
- Assented to: June 27, 1969

Legislative history
- Bill title: 28th Parliament, Bill C-150
- Introduced by: John Turner, Minister of Justice
- First reading: December 19, 1968
- Second reading: January 23, 1969
- Third reading: May 14, 1969
- Voting summary: 149 voted for; 55 voted against

The Criminal Law Amendment Act, 1968–69 (French: Loi de 1968–69 modifiant le droit pénal) was an omnibus bill that introduced major changes to the Canadian Criminal Code. An earlier version was first introduced as Bill C-195 by then Minister of Justice Pierre Trudeau in the second session of the 27th Canadian Parliament on December 21, 1967, which was modified and re-introduced as Bill C-150 by then Minister of Justice John Turner in the first session of the 28th Canadian Parliament. After heated debates, it passed third reading in the House of Commons by a vote of 149 to 55. The bill was a massive 126-page, 120-clause amendment to the criminal law and criminal procedure of Canada.

The bill decriminalized homosexual acts and homosexuals nationwide and allowed abortion under certain conditions. A related bill, introduced and passed at the same time, decriminalised the sale of contraceptives. The Act also regulated lotteries, tightened the rules for gun possession, and introduced new offences relating to drinking and driving, harassing phone calls, misleading advertising, and cruelty to animals.

John Turner, Trudeau's successor as Minister of Justice, described the bill as "the most important and all-embracing reform of the criminal and penal law ever attempted at one time in this country." Trudeau famously defended the bill by telling reporters that "there's no place for the state in the bedrooms of the nation," adding that "what's done in private between adults doesn't concern the Criminal Code".

== Vote ==
May 14, 1969, vote in the House of Commons of Canada (3rd Reading)
Party	Voted for	Voted against	Present	Absent
G Liberal Party	119: Hubert Badanai; H. Gordon Barrett; Ron Basford; Albert Béchard; Bruce Beer; Edgar Benson; Gustave Blouin; Robert Borrie; Prosper Boulanger; James Elisha Brown; Charles Caccia; Léo Cadieux; Norman Cafik; Jean-Charles Cantin; Hyliard Chappell; Gaston Clermont; Joseph-Roland Comtois; Eymard Corbin; Florian Côté; Jean-Pierre Côté; Guy Crossman; Bud Cullen; Alexandre Cyr; Barney Danson; John Davis; Pierre De Bané; Grant Deachman; Walter Deakon; Charles Drury; Jean-Eudes Dubé; Gérard Duquet; René Émard; Viateur Éthier; Yves Forest; Victor Forget; Maurice Foster; Lloyd Francis; Rosaire Gendron; Paul Mullins Gervais; Colin David Gibson; Alastair Gillespie; Philip Gerald Givens; Thomas Henry Goode; Jean-Pierre Goyer; Herb Gray; Joseph-Philippe Guay; Raynald Joseph Albert Guay; Jacques Guilbault; Stanley Haidasz; Russell Honey; Len Hopkins; Bruce Howard; James Jerome; Eric Kierans; Ovide Laflamme; Arthur Laing; Paul Langlois; Gérald Laniel; Louis Guy LeBlanc; Thomas Lefebvre; Carl Legault; H.-Pit Lessard; Marcel Lessard; James Gordon Lind; Allan MacEachen; Mark MacGuigan; Bryce Mackasey; Pat Mahoney; Robert Benoit Major; Gilles Marceau; Jean Marchand; Len Marchand; George James McIlraith; James Carroll Patrick McNulty; Joseph-Alfred Mongrain; John B. Morison; John Carr Munro; Charles Terrence Murphy; Martin Patrick O'Connell; Bud Orange; Edmund Boyd Osler; Steven Otto; André Ouellet; Gérard Pelletier; Keith Penner; Ray Perrault; J.-E. Bernard Pilon; Arthur Portelance; Marcel Prud'homme; John Mercer Reid^{a}; James Armstrong Richardson; John Roberts; Jean-Léo Rochon; Jean Robert Roy; Marcel-Claude Roy; Sylvester Perry Ryan; Gaetan Serré; Mitchell Sharp; Mark Smerchanski; G.A. Percy Smith; Walter Bernard Smith; Paul St. Pierre; Harold Edwin Stafford; Robert Douglas George Stanbury; Ralph Wesley Stewart; William Douglas Stewart; J. Antonio Thomas; Donald Ross Tolmie; Pierre Trudeau; Jacques L. Trudel; Charles Robert Turner; John Turner; Ian Grant Wahn; James Edgar Walker; Ian Watson; Eugene Whelan; Ross Whicher; Rutherford Lester Whiting; Antonio Yanakis	1: Gordon Joseph Sullivan	-	34: Warren Allmand; David Anderson; Bob Andras; Duncan Gordon Blair; Herb Breau; Judd Buchanan; Jean Chrétien; Gerald Richard Cobbe; Albert B. Douglas; James Hugh Faulkner; John James Greene; David Walter Groos; Hu Harries; Paul Theodore Hellyer; Douglas Aird Hogarth; Kieth Reinhardt Hymmen; Joseph Gaston Isabelle; Donald Campbell Jamieson; Robert Phillip Kaplan; Georges-C. Lachance; Otto Emil Lang; Fernand-E. Leblanc; Gérard Loiselle; Donald Stovel Macdonald; Murray Arndell McBride; Aurélien Noël; Horace Andrew Olson; Jean-Luc Pepin; M. Ervin Pringle; Jean-Thomas Richard; William Kenneth Robinson; Raymond Rock; Allen B. Sulatycky; David Bennington Weatherhead
Progressive Conservative Party	12: Lincoln MacCauley Alexander; Thomas Miller Bell; Robert Gordon Lee Fairweather; William David Knowles; Heath Nelson Macquarrie; Robert Jardine McCleave; Frank Duff Moores; Wallace Bickford Nesbitt; John Patrick Nowlan; William Gordon Ritchie; Robert Lorne Stanfield; Eldon Mattison Woolliams	43: Cliff Downey; Jay Waldo Monteith; Almonte Douglas Alkenbrack; Frederick Johnstone Bigg; Robert Carman Coates; Desmond Morton Code; Lloyd Roseville Crouse; Harold Warren Danforth; John Diefenbaker; Walter Gilbert Dinsdale; Hugh John Flemming; J. Michael Forrestall; Lee Elgy Grills; Deane Roscoe Gundlock; Alfred Dryden Hales; William Marvin Howe; Roch La Salle; Marcel Joseph Aimé Lambert; Howard Russell MacEwan; Donald MacInnis; Jack Marshall; Donald Frank Mazankowski; Maclyn Thomas McCutcheon; James Aloysius McGrath; John McIntosh; Robert Elgin McKinley; Melvin James McQuaid; George Robson Muir; Robert Muir; Percy Verner Noble; Steve Eugene Paproski; Ambrose Hubert Peddle; J.-H.-Théogène Ricard; Philip Bernard Rynard; Stanley Stanford Schumacher; William C. Scott; Robert Simpson; Richard Russell Southam; Donald Craig Stewart; Charles Humbert Thomas; Robert Norman Thompson; Georges-J. Valade; Paul Yewchuk	-	17: Gordon Harvey Aiken; Martial Asselin; Gerald William Baldwin; Albert C. Cadieu; Walter C. Carter; Louis-Roland Comeau; Douglas Scott Harkness; George Harris Hees; John Henry Horner; Stanley James Korchinski; John Howard Lundrigan; David Samuel Horne MacDonald; John Angus MacLean; John Chester MacRae; Harry Andrew Moore; Erik Nielsen; William Skoreyko
New Democratic Party	18: Thomas Speakman Barnett; Leslie Gordon Benjamin; Francis Andrew Brewin; John Edward Broadbent; John Burton; Thomas Clement Douglas; John Gilbert; Alfred Pullen Gleave; Randolph Harding; Stanley Howard Knowles; David Lewis; Winona Grace MacInnis; Barry Mather; Lorne Edmund Nystrom; William Arnold Peters; Mark Willson Rose; John Leroy Skoberg; Harold Edward Winch	-	-	5: Frank Howard; David Orlikow; Max Saltsman; Ed Schreyer; Roderick J. Thomson
Ralliement Créditiste	-	11: Léonel Beaudoin; Réal Caouette; Charles-Eugène Dionne; André-Gilles Fortin; Charles-Arthur Gauthier; Roland Godin; Henry P. Latulippe; René Matte; Romuald Rodrigue; Gilbert F. Rondeau; Oza Tétrault	-	3: Bernard Dumont; Joseph Adrien Henri Lambert; Gérard Laprise
Independent	-	-	1: Lucien Lamoureux (Speaker)	-
Total	149	55	1	59

a. John Mercer Reid was elected as a member of the Liberal-Labour Party, but caucused with the Liberal Party of Canada until the 1972 general election, when he rejoined the main political party.

== Changes to the Criminal Code ==
=== Abortion and contraception ===
==== Abortion ====
Bill C-150 legalized therapeutic abortion under certain conditions. Abortion was previously a criminal offence in Canada, which was still largely influenced by the Catholic Church's moral positions on this issue. Bill C-150 made it legal for women to get an abortion if a therapeutic abortion committee of three doctors felt the pregnancy endangered the mental, emotional or physical well-being of the mother. In a 1999 speech celebrating the 30th anniversary of the bill's passage, Senator Lucie Pépin argued that the new freedom provided by Bill C-150 "proved to be a stepping stone for many other freedoms and options that have altered women's place in [Canadian] society — self-esteem, education, jobs, a voice and empowerment". Abortion legislation in Canada was further liberalized in 1988 with the R. v. Morgentaler ruling, which left Canada without any laws regulating abortion through all nine months of pregnancy.

==== Contraceptives ====
Prior to 1968, the Criminal Code made it an offence to offer to sell, advertise, or have in one's possession for the purpose of sale any "medicine, drug, or article intended or represented as a method of preventing conception or causing abortion or miscarriage." As part of the package of reforms contained in the Criminal Law Amendment Act, the government also introduced Bill S-15, which decriminalised contraceptives and brought them under the regulatory power of the Food and Drugs Act, which governs medicines and medicinal devices. Bill S-15 repealed the reference to contraceptives in the Criminal Code, but left abortifacients criminalised. Bill S-15 received royal assent on June 27, 1969, the same day as the Criminal Law Amendment Act.

=== Homosexuality ===
Bill C-150 decriminalized "buggery" and "gross indecency" between adults over age 21, and between husband and wife, provided each party consented. The two offences had been used to criminalise homosexual acts between men. The British Parliament's adoption of the Sexual Offences Act 1967, influenced Trudeau's decision to include amendments to the Criminal Code concerning homosexuality in Bill C-150. Opposition to homosexuality was so intense that the Catholic Créditistes of Quebec held up debate for six weeks. The Créditistes suggested that communism, socialism and atheism were behind the proposed changes relating to homosexuality and abortion; they demanded that a public referendum be held on these issues and staged a filibuster of Parliament over the amendments concerning abortion.

Proponents of partial decriminalization defended their position by saying that "[h]omosexuality in itself" would remain unlawful unless both parties were over 21 and the act took place in private. Prior to the law being passed, private consensual homosexual conduct was rarely prosecuted. Historian Tom Hooper says that it is a "myth" that the law decriminalized homosexuality and in fact, it "facilitated the recriminalization of homosexuality in Canada".

=== Gambling ===
Prior to Bill C-150, Criminal Code exemptions that permitted small-scale gambling on behalf of charities were introduced. Between 1892 and 1969, Canadians could wager on horse races or gamble at summer fair midways. These charitable experiences with gambling eventually led Bill C-150 to give the provincial and federal governments the opportunity to use lotteries to fund worthwhile activities (e.g. 1976 Montreal Olympics).

=== Gun control ===
Gun politics in Canada were also affected by Bill C-150, which for the first time made it illegal to provide firearms to persons of "unsound mind" or criminals under prohibition orders. The law also expanded the definition of a 'firearm', which, prior to 1969, included only handguns and automatic firearms, and introduced non-restricted, restricted, and prohibited firearm categories.

=== Drunk driving ===
Bill C-150 also addressed the issue of drunk driving. The bill made it an offence to drive with a blood alcohol content (BAC) in excess of 80 mg/100 ml of blood. Refusal of a police officer's demand to provide a breath sample was made an offence at the same time and both began as summary conviction offences, with a mandatory minimum $50 fine.
