= Eike-Henner Kluge =

Canadian-German medical ethicist

PhD Eike-Henner Kluge
- Awards: Royal Society of Canada, Abbyann Lynch Medal

Education
- Education: University of Calgary; University of Michigan

Philosophical work
- Main interests: Biomedical (Medical Ethics) and information ethics, topics in the history of philosophy.

Eike-Henner Kluge FRSC is the first medical ethics expert witness recognized by Canadian courts. Dr. Kluge has acted as an expert witness in Alberta, British Columbia, and Ontario. He is known for his work on contentious medical ethics issue such as abortion and the ethics of deliberate death in addition to privacy and medical informatics. He established and was the first director of the Canadian Medical Association Department of Ethics and Legal Affairs. Dr. Kluge is the author of the International Medical Informatics Association's code of ethics and their ethics handbook. Additionally, he is a fellow in the Royal Society of Canada. In 2022 he acted as an ethics consultant to the British Columbia Ministry of Mental Health and Addiction, and wrote a report Ethics Framework for the Opioid Overdose Crisis Response advising them that it would be ethically appropriate to implement a program that would enable addicted persons to access pharmaceuticals in place of toxic street drugs.

== Abortion ==
While the director of the Canadian Medical Association ethics and legal affairs, Dr. Kluge in 1991 drafted an analysis for a Senate committee about Bill C-43, which would sentence doctors to two years in jail for performing abortions where a woman's health is not at risk. Kluge viewed that the bill was flawed ethically. His presentation may have swayed two votes to change resulting in an unprecedented tied vote in January 1991 which resulted in the Senate not passing the Bill C-43.

== Deliberate Death ==
He was an expert witness in Rodriguez v British Columbia (AG) which was the first case to challenge section 241(b) of the Criminal Code and Carter v Canada (AG). Dr Kluge acted as ethics advisor to Sue Rodriguez. He argues that, "there is no right to die—but there is a right to shape and end our lives in keeping with our competently-held values...It is all a matter of autonomy, beneficence and non-malfeasance." Eike-Henner was also an expert witness in Carter v Canada (AG).

== Law School Admission Council Investigation ==
Dr Kluge's complaint to the Office of the Privacy Commissioner of Canada led to the Law School Admission Council's no longer being able to fingerprint LSAT test takers in Canada.

== Publications ==
=== Books ===
- William of Ockham’s Commentary on Porphyry: Introduction and English Translation (serialised in Franciscan Studies, 1973–74).
- The Practice of Death (1975)
- The Metaphysics of Gottlob Frege: An Essay in Ontological Reconstruction (1980)
- The Ethics of Deliberate Death (1981)
- New human reproductive technologies : a preliminary perspective of the Canadian Medical Association (1991)
- Readings in Biomedical Ethics: A Canadian Focus {1993; 1999; 2004)
- The Ethics of Electronic Patient Records (2001)
- A Handbook of Ethics for Health Informatics Professionals 2003)
- Ethics in Health Care: A Canadian Focus (2013)
- Ethics for Health Informatics Professionals: The IMIA Code, its Meaning and Implications (2016)
- The Electronic Health Record: Ethical Considerations (2020)
- The Right to Healthcare: Ethical Considerations (2022)
- The Ethics of Artificial Intelligence in Healthcare (2024)

=== Co-author books ===
- Withholding Treatment from Defective Newborn Children (1985)
- Home telehealth for chronic disease management (2008)

=== Documentaries ===
- Shadow Company (2006) - As Self - Professor of Ethics

=== Selected academic works ===
- Kluge, Eike-Henner W. (1970). "Secure e-Health: Managing risks to patient health data". International Journal of Medical Informatics. 76 (5–6): 402–406. doi:10.1016/j.ijmedinf.2006.09.003. PMID 17084665.
- Kluge, Eike-Henner W. (2000), "Assisted Suicide, Ethics and the Law: The Implication of Autonomy and Respect for Persons, Equality and Justice, and Beneficence", in Prado, C. G. (ed.), Assisted Suicide: Canadian Perspectives, Ottawa, Canada: University of Ottawa Press, p. 83
- Kluge, Eike-Henner W. (2015). "Ethical Considerations on Methods Used in Abortions". Health Care Analysis. 23 (1): 1–18. doi:10.1007/s10728-012-0232-1. PMID 23076345. S2CID 44776709.
