= Shadow Company =

- Movie poster for Shadow Company
- Directed by: Nick Bicanic; Jason Bourque
- Written by: Nick Bicanic; Jason Bourque
- Produced by: Nick Bicanic; Remy Kozak; Andrew Wanliss-Orlebar
- Starring: Robert Young Pelton; P. W. Singer
- Cinematography: Jarred Land
- Edited by: Les Lukacs
- Music by: Andrew Wanliss-Orlebar
- Distributed by: Purpose Films
- Release date: August 23, 2006
- Running time: 86 min.
- Country: Canada
- Language: English

Shadow Company is a documentary directed by Nick Bicanic and Jason Bourque and narrated by Gerard Butler. It is an introduction to the mercenary and private military company industry, concentrating on the role the industry has been playing in recent conflicts. It was released on DVD in August 2006.

== Content ==
The documentary film is not presented with a complete voice narrative nor a linear story-telling structure. Instead, most of the documentary deals with the issues presented in a topical fashion. There are three primary methods that the filmmakers use to organize and present information. The first is through the personal account of a security contractor named James Ashcroft, the second is to pose questions and directly answer them, and the third method is to utilize small case studies. The film contains footage of mercenary and private military soldiers training in Iraq. Director Nick Bicanic was invited to a Senate Committee Hearing to testify on the subject of mercenaries/private military contractors on September 21, 2007.

=== Letters from James ===
At certain intervals in the documentary, the audience is read different letter excerpts from a security contractor named James Ashcroft (voiced by Gerard Butler). The letter scenes explain the details of James's work and life in Iraq and a small amount of his personal history. Much of the comedy from the documentary is displayed in these scenes. In addition, the letters serve as an opener and a closer for the interview portions of the documentary.

One scene displays a quick montage of James’s life up to Iraq. The viewer finds out James Ashcroft was a graduate of the University of Oxford. Sometime after graduation, he joined the British military and performed bodyguard work in Milan and Paris later on. When the audience listens to his first letter, they find out that he quit his last job at a law firm before heading to Iraq.

His new line of work in Iraq involves being a security contractor for a reputable private military company. He says he is on a ‘six on three off rotation’, which means he works for six weeks, before getting three weeks of off time, and the letters are written in the six-week time frame. Also, he mentions working out of a villa in the Green Zone, the area where the Coalition Provisional Authority resides.

Ashcroft shares how his firm procures weapons like AK-47s and PKMs from the Sadr City bazaar, and how the US military or his firm deals with insurgents. James Ashcroft's autobiography, Making A Killing, written with the ghostwriter Clifford Thurlow was published by Virgin in the UK in 2006 and the US in 2007.

Part of the proceeds of the DVD sales go to the Cape Community Elementary School in Freetown, Sierra Leone.

== Interviewees ==
Listed in the press release are:

- P. W. Singer, senior analyst of the Brookings Institution
- Alan W. Bell, former British Armed Forces member and president of Globe Risk International, a private security consulting company.
- Robert Young Pelton, author and adventurer
- Madelaine Drohan, author and journalist
- Ian Church, adventurer
- Phil Lancaster, Major (Ret.) of the Canadian Armed Forces (aide of Roméo Dallaire during UNAMIR)
- Slavko Ilic, security contractor
- Cobus Claassens, security contractor
- Neall Ellis, private military contractor
- Doug Brooks, IPOA president
- Stephen J. Cannell, producer, creator of The A-Team
- Eike-Henner W. Kluge, professor of ethics
- Frances Stonor Saunders, author and historian
- John F. Mullins, Vietnam veteran turned mercenary, he became known for serving as the protagonist and military consultant for the First-person shooter video game series Soldier of Fortune.
- Tasha Bradsell (née Larson), journalist and wife of Andy Bradsell, British Special Forces veteran killed in Iraq while working as a private security contractor for London-based company Olive Security. Tasha used to work for the Canadian television station The New VI, but with the death of her husband she retired from journalism and founded Baraka Gardens in his memory.
