= Canadian Youth for Choice =

Pro-choice youth advocacy group in Ottawa, Ontario

Canadian Youth for Choice (CYC) is a pro-choice youth advocacy group based in Ottawa, Ontario. The group, which is the first of its kind in Canada, advocates for the sexual and reproductive rights of people between the ages of 13 and 30.

CYC work with the goal of increasing access to information and services relating to reproductive health for all Canadian youth. They have written a "Canadian Charter of Sexual and Reproductive Rights of Youth" and petitioned the House of Commons of Canada to pass it into law.

Four members of Canadian Youth for Choice participated in a cross-country tour designed to provide sex education in the summer of 2007.
