= Abortion Rights Coalition of Canada =

- Abbreviation: ARCC
- Formation: 2005
- Type: Rights Coalition
- Legal status: active
- Purpose: pro-choice organization
- Headquarters: Vancouver, British Columbia, Canada
- Region served: Canada
- Official language: English French
- Website: https://www.arcc-cdac.ca/

The Abortion Rights Coalition of Canada (ARCC) is a Canadian abortion rights organization which was founded in 2005. Headquartered in Vancouver, British Columbia, it is currently the only political group in Canada which is engaged in pro-abortion rights activism on a national level.

== Background ==
Canada is signed under the International Covenant on Economic, Social, and Cultural Rights, but fails to meet standards outlined within it regarding abortion. Some women in Canada still have problems accessing abortion services because about 80% of hospitals will not perform them. Other challenges to abortion in Canada include protests outside abortion clinics. Legislation was imposed in an attempt to put an end to these protests.

== Data base ==
The Abortion Rights Coalition of Canada provides a detailed list of abortion clinics by province and the maximum gestational period that the clinic will provide abortion up to. This information is available in English, French, and Mandarin. This website also has other resources, including information on referrals and how to obtain financial support for travel expenses, after-treatment supplies, child care and various other needs.

== See also ==
- Abortion in Canada
- Canadian Abortion Rights Action League
- Abortion Caravan
