= Morgentaler v The Queen =

- Supreme Court of Canada

Hearing: October 2, 3, 4, 7, 1974 Judgment: 1975-03-26
- Full case name: Dr. Henry Morgentaler (Appellant) v Her Majesty The Queen (Respondent) and Attorney General of Canada, Foundation for Women in Crisis, Canadian Civil Liberties Association, Alliance for Life, Association des médecins du Québec and the Front Commun pour le Respect de la vie, and Fondation pour la vie (Interveners)
- Citations: Morgentaler v. The Queen, [1976] 1 S.C.R. 616
- Prior history: APPEAL from a judgment of the Court of Queen's Bench, Appeal Side, Province of Quebec: R v Morgentaler, [1974] CA 129 (Casey, Rinfret, Crete, Bélanger and Dubé JJ.A).
- Ruling: Appeal dismissed.

Holding
- Section 251 of the Criminal Code which prohibits abortion except under certain circumstances is a valid exercise of the federal criminal law power and does not infringe the Canadian Bill of Rights. The indictment was not an abuse of process. The defence of necessity did not apply, nor did the defence set out in s 45 of the Criminal Code relating to medical procedures. The Court of Appeal had the power to set aside the acquittal and enter a conviction, but this power is to be used with great circumspection.

Court membership
- Chief Justice: Bora Laskin; Puisne Justices: Ronald Martland, Wilfred Judson, Roland Ritchie, Wishart Spence, Louis-Philippe Pigeon, Brian Dickson, Jean Beetz, Louis-Philippe de Grandpré

Reasons given
- Majority: Pigeon J, joined by Martland, Ritchie, Beetz and de Grandpré JJ
- Majority: Dickson J, joined by Martland, Ritchie, Beetz and de Grandpré JJ
- Concurrence: Dickson J
- Concurrence: Pigeon J
- Concur/dissent: Laskin CJC, joined by Judson and Spence JJ

Laws applied
- Criminal Code, RSC 1970, c C-34, ss 45, 251(1), (4), 613(4)(b), 603, 605, 618(2)

Morgentaler v The Queen is a decision of the Supreme Court of Canada where physician Henry Morgentaler unsuccessfully challenged the prohibition of abortion in Canada under the federal Criminal Code. The Court found the abortion law was appropriately passed by Parliament under the laws of federalism. This was the first of three Supreme Court decisions on abortion that were brought by Morgentaler.

== Background ==
Morgentaler was prosecuted, for openly providing abortions, by the provincial government of Quebec three times, but they failed to secure a conviction at a jury trial:

- The first Quebec case was in 1973. Morgentaler used the defence of necessity, that abortions were necessary for his patients' life or health. The jury acquitted him. However, Quebec's provincial appeal court reversed the acquittal and replaced it with a conviction and a prison term.
- In 1975, a jury in Quebec again found Morgentaler not guilty. However, Morgentaler was already in prison. In 1975, under Prime Minister Pierre Trudeau, the law of Canada was changed so that courts could not replace a jury acquittal by a conviction (however, appeal courts can still overturn an acquittal and order a new trial). This is called the Morgentaler Amendment.
- After Morgentaler was released from prison, Quebec again brought a case against him. A jury acquitted him for the third time. In 1976, the Parti Québécois was elected and announced that it would not prosecute Morgentaler, so the repeated prosecutions came to an end.

Morgentaler challenged the law on two grounds. First, on the grounds that modern abortion techniques were no longer a threat to the woman's health so the dangers that the law was intending to protect no longer applied and consequently the law no longer had a valid criminal purpose required under the federal government's criminal law-making power under section 91(27) of the Constitution Act, 1867. Second, on the grounds that the provisions violated the Canadian Bill of Rights.

== Reasons of the court ==
The Court, split 6 to 3, held that the abortion provisions were still valid as there was still a criminal law purpose in prohibiting abortion even without there being a danger to the woman. The general purpose of the law was to "protect the state interest and the foetus", which was sufficient to invoke the criminal law power under the Constitution.

The Court also rejected the challenge on the basis that it violated the Bill of Rights.

== Aftermath ==
It would not be until 13 years later, after the introduction of the Charter, that Morgentaler successfully challenged the provisions in the decision of R. v. Morgentaler (1988).

In 1993, Morgentaler also successfully challenged a provincial attempt to regulate abortion in the decision of R. v. Morgentaler (1993).

== See also ==
- List of Supreme Court of Canada cases (Laskin Court)
