= Abortion in Canada =

Abortion in Canada is legal throughout pregnancy and is publicly funded as a medical procedure under the combined effects of the federal Canada Health Act and provincial health-care systems. While some restrictions exist, Canada is one of the few nations with no criminal restrictions on abortion. Access to services and resources varies by region, as abortion is subject to provincial healthcare regulatory rules and guidelines for physicians. No jurisdiction offers abortion on request at 24 weeks and beyond, although there are exceptions for certain medical complications.

Formally banned in 1869, abortion remained illegal in Canadian law for the next 100 years. In 1969, the Criminal Law Amendment Act, 1968–69 legalized therapeutic abortions, as long as a committee of doctors certified that continuing the pregnancy would likely endanger the woman's life or health. In 1988, the Supreme Court of Canada ruled in R. v. Morgentaler that the existing law was unconstitutional, and struck down the 1969 Act. The ruling found that the 1969 abortion law violated a woman's right to "life, liberty and security of the person" guaranteed under Section 7 of the Canadian Charter of Rights and Freedoms established in 1982.

In Canada, all surgical abortions are performed by a physician, with nurse practitioners, pharmacists and midwives able to provide medications for non-invasive medical abortions within nine weeks (63 days) of gestation. Canada has had a relatively stable abortion rate since decriminalization; the rate of recorded abortion per 1000 women of childbearing age (15–44) was 10.2 in 1974, rising to 16.4 abortions per thousand women in 1997, and declining to 10.1 abortions per 1000 women in 2020. However, these rates of abortion only reflect the number of abortions reported by abortion clinics and hospitals. They do not account for unreported abortions in these setting or count abortions induced by prescription drugs such as mifepristone and misoprostol taken at home, and so these official rates of abortion undercount the true rate of abortion. Nevertheless, Canada has a low abortion rate overall compared to other countries, with approximately 74,000 abortions reported in 2020. Roughly half of abortions occur among women aged 18 to 29 years and roughly 90% of abortions are performed within the first trimester (12 weeks).

== History ==
=== Early history ===
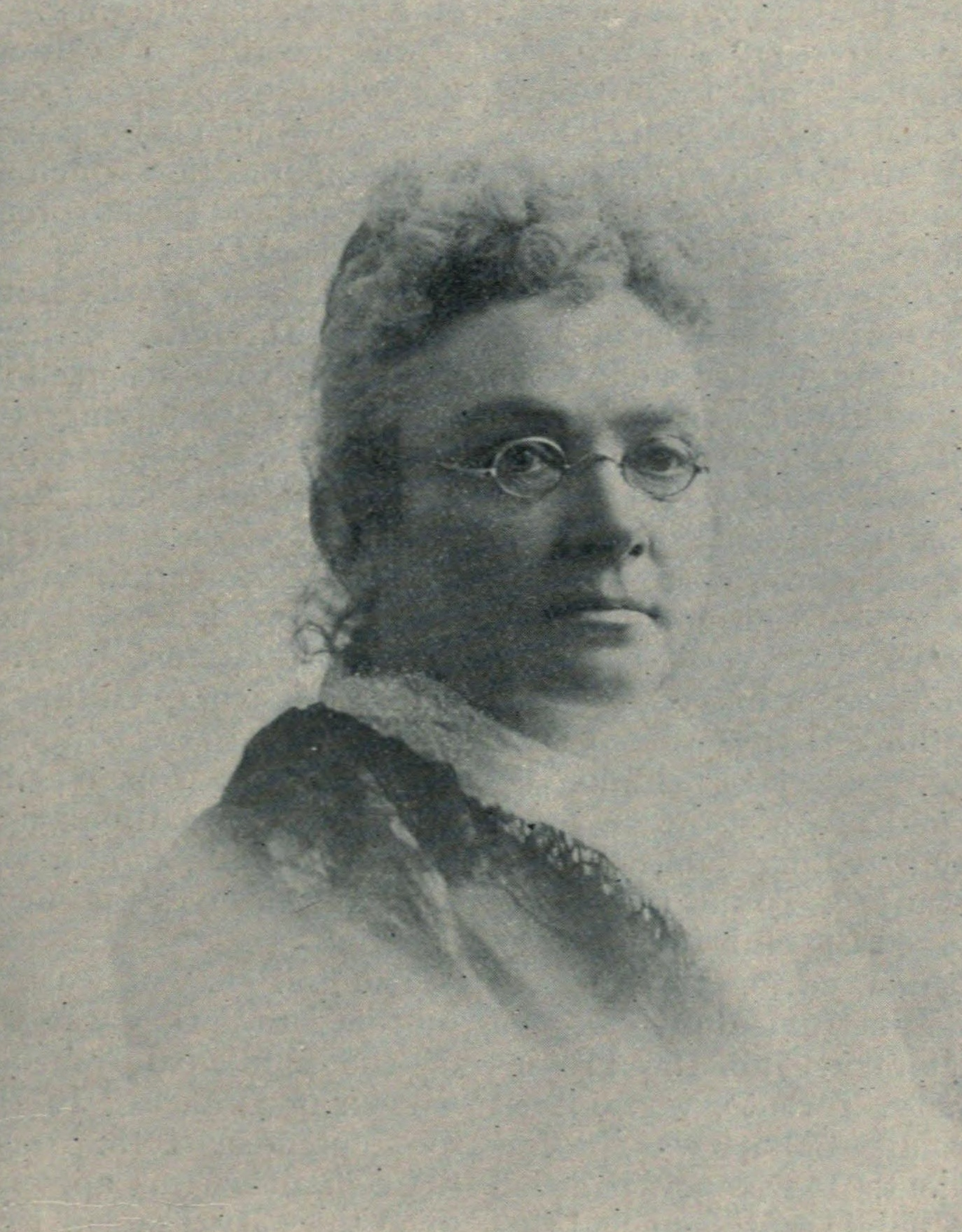
Emily Howard Stowe was the first female physician to practise in Canada, the second licensed female physician in Canada and an activist for women's rights and suffrage.

During the eighteenth and early nineteenth centuries, abortion before the “quickening” (15–20 weeks) was legal in the British North American colonies. However, as the century progressed, the United Kingdom began to pass laws which created criminal offences relating to abortion, such as the Malicious Shooting or Stabbing Act 1803, that made performing or attempting to perform a post quickening abortion a death penalty offence. That was followed in 1837 by the Offences Against the Person Act 1837, that removed the death penalty clause, while making the procurement of any miscarriage unlawful. The British North American provinces followed the British example and began restricting abortion rights. Abortion was prohibited in Canada in 1869, two years after the country's formation. That prohibition was continued in the Criminal Code until 1969. Anyone who procured a miscarriage for a woman was liable to imprisonment for life, while a woman who procured a miscarriage for herself was liable to imprisonment for two years.

As in other countries, illegal abortions were still performed, and some cases charged that this led to the deaths of women. The abortion trial of Emily Stowe (1879) is one early example. Another such case, Azoulay v The Queen, reached the Supreme Court in 1952. In both cases, the alleged abortion provider was ultimately acquitted of responsibility for the woman's death. Abortion rights activist Marilyn Wilson, former executive director of the Canadian Abortion Rights Action League, says, "Illegal abortions were common, but often of poor safety. Several hundred women per year died from botched abortions."

=== Liberalisation of abortion laws ===
==== Chief Coroner Shulman ====
The movement to liberalize Canada's abortion laws began in the 1960s. Former Chief Coroner of Ontario Morton Shulman recalls that in the sixties, abortion could be legally performed only to save the life of the woman, so there were practically no legal abortions. He stated that the pregnant daughters of the rich were sent to reliable physicians who did abortions for cash. He estimated that these physicians did twenty to thirty abortions per week. Women who were not rich were left to perform an abortion on themselves or go to what he called a "nurse" abortionist. Their method was commonly pumping Lysol into the woman's womb. The mortality rate was high and the infection rate was over 50%. He added, "By the time I became Chief Coroner, I had had the unpleasant experience of seeing the bodies of some dozens of young women who had died as a result of these amateur abortions."

Shulman decided to publicize deaths from illegal abortions. He instructed his coroners to call a public inquest into each abortion death. He describes one case that he believes was the turning point, that of 34-year-old Lottie Leanne Clarke, a mother of three children, who died of a massive infection in 1964 after an illegal abortion in spite of medical treatment and antibiotics. At the inquest into her death, the jury recommended that the laws about therapeutic abortion be revised. Shulman added that a federal government committee should review the question of abortion and the law. Newspapers published editorials recommending the reform of the abortion law. In 1965, the Minister of Justice, Guy Favreau, wrote to Shulman that the recommendation would be considered in the program to amend the Criminal Code. The eventual amendment closely followed the recommendations of the coroners' juries.

==== Partial de-criminalisation ====
In 1967, Justice Minister Pierre Trudeau introduced a bill which included an amendment to the provision of the Criminal Code which prohibited abortions. The bill, known as the Criminal Law Amendment Act, 1968–69, continued the basic prohibition on abortions, with the potential life sentence. However, the bill made an exception for abortions performed in a hospital with the approval of that hospital's three-doctor therapeutic abortion committee. The committee would have to certify that the pregnancy would be likely to endanger the life or health of the pregnant woman. The term health was not defined, and therapeutic abortion committees were free to develop their own theories as to when a likely danger to "health" (which might include psychological health) would justify a therapeutic abortion. This same bill also legalized homosexuality and contraception, and would be the subject of one of Trudeau's most famous quotations: "The state has no business in the bedrooms of the nation."

When he introduced the bill in 1967, Trudeau was Minister of Justice in the government of Prime Minister Lester Pearson. In 1968, Pearson retired and Trudeau succeeded him as prime minister. The bill did not pass before the 1968 election, but was re-introduced by John Turner, Minister of Justice in the Trudeau government. Parliament passed the bill in 1969. In the 1970 federal statute revision, the provision was re-numbered as s. 251 of the Criminal Code.

==== Badgley report ====
In 1975, a Committee on the Operation of the Abortion Law was appointed "to conduct a study to determine whether the procedure provided in the Criminal Code for obtaining therapeutic abortions [was] operating equitably across Canada", and to make recommendations "on the operation of this law rather than recommendations on the underlying policy". The Committee, known as the Badgley Committee after its Chair, Dr. Robin F. Badgley, reported in January 1977. It found, quite simply, that "the procedures set out for the operation of Abortion Law are not working equitably across Canada". In large part, this was because the intent of the law was neither clear nor agreed upon. Access to abortion as set out in the Criminal Code was not available for many women due to variations in distribution of hospitals and doctors, and in whether Therapeutic Abortion Committees were set up and in doctors' interpretations of "health" for women, ages of consent, and parental notification requirements. The report recommended better family planning to reduce the number of unwanted pregnancies, but their main conclusion was that abortion services were not being delivered as required.

=== Difficulties in access before decriminalization ===
By 1982, there were 66,319 legal abortions in Canada. Interpretation of the 1969 law varied widely between doctors and hospitals, leading to uneven access. The standard was the physical or mental well-being of the woman, to be decided by a hospital's Therapeutic Abortion Committee. However, there was no requirement for a hospital to have a TAC to evaluate women. Only about one-third of hospitals had one. Some committees took a liberal stance and allowed most requests, while others blocked almost all requests. Access to legal abortions was easy in major metropolitan areas, but much harder outside large cities. In the province of Prince Edward Island, the lone Therapeutic Abortion Committee shut down, and there were no legal abortions in the province after 1982. The Therapeutic Abortion Committees often took days or weeks to make their decisions, pushing a pregnancy further along than it would have been otherwise. The women were not seen by the committee, and had no right to appeal a decision. Advocates for abortion rights believed that the choice should be made by the woman, rather than a panel of doctors.

Because of the lack of facilities in smaller provinces and rural areas, women were often forced to travel to major cities at their own expense. In St. John's, there was a period of time in which only a single gynaecologist performed abortions. Many women in Newfoundland had to buy expensive plane tickets to Toronto or Montreal to get an abortion. Other women chose to travel to the United States, where abortions became available at many private clinics after the Roe v. Wade decision in 1973. In 1982, 4,311 Canadian women travelled to the United States for an abortion.

=== Constitutional challenges to the abortion law ===
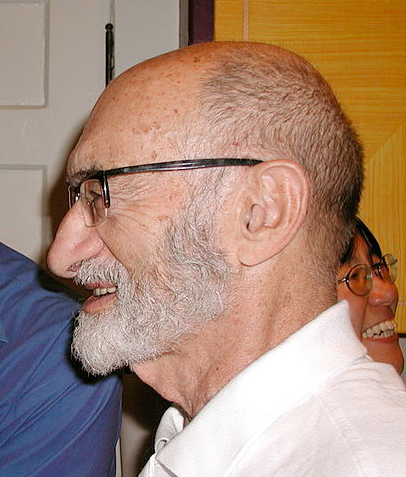
Dr. Henry Morgentaler was an abortion-rights advocate physician who fought numerous legal battles aimed at expanding abortion rights.

In defiance of the law, Dr. Henry Morgentaler began performing abortions at his clinic in Montreal without approval of a therapeutic abortion committee. He challenged the constitutionality of the abortion law on two separate occasions. The Supreme Court of Canada dismissed his first constitutional challenge in 1975, brought under the division of powers and the Canadian Bill of Rights, but in 1988, the Supreme Court allowed his second challenge, brought under the Canadian Charter of Rights and Freedoms. The Court held that the abortion law was inoperative. Morgentaler eventually brought a third constitutional challenge, to a provincial law restricting access to abortions. He was successful in that challenge as well.

Morgentaler's struggle prompted a nationwide movement to reform Canada's abortion laws. In 1970, as part of the Abortion Caravan, 35 women chained themselves to the parliamentary gallery in the House of Commons, closing Parliament for the first time in Canadian history.

==== First Morgentaler challenge: 1975 ====
In 1973, Morgentaler stated publicly that he had performed 5,000 abortions without the permission of the three-doctor committees, even going so far as to videotape himself performing operations.

The Crown prosecution service of Quebec prosecuted Morgentaler three times, and each time juries refused to convict him despite his outright admission that he had performed many abortions. The Crown appealed the first acquittal. In 1974, the Quebec Court of Appeal overturned the jury's verdict of acquittal in the first case, substituted a guilty verdict, and returned the matter to the trial judge for sentencing.

Morgentaler then appealed to the Supreme Court of Canada on several grounds, arguing that:

- the Criminal Code provision was unconstitutional under the division of powers;
- the provision was inoperative under the Canadian Bill of Rights;
- the Court of Appeal did not have the authority to overturn the jury verdict of acquittal;
- the defence of necessity was available;
- s. 45 of the Criminal Code, which provided that a medical practitioner was not criminally liable for performing surgical procedures, was available as a defence.

In 1975, the Supreme Court dismissed his appeal by a 6–3 decision: Morgentaler v The Queen. The Court was unanimous that the provision was valid criminal law, and therefore within the constitutional authority of the federal Parliament; it did not intrude on provincial jurisdiction over health. The Court also held unanimously that the law did not infringe the Canadian Bill of Rights.

The Court gave those rulings from the bench, with written reasons on these points later given by Chief Justice Laskin. However, the Court split 6–3 on the issues of necessity and s. 45 of the Criminal Code, which provided that a medical doctor who performed a surgery according to reasonable medical standards was immune from criminal liability:

- Six members of the Court, for reasons written by Justice Pigeon, held that the Criminal Code provisions respecting Crown appeals authorised the Court of Appeal to substitute a guilty verdict.
- Six members also held, for reasons given by Justice Pigeon and Justice Dickson, that the defences of necessity and s. 45 did not apply to the criminal offence of procuring an abortion.
- In dissent, three members of the Court, for reasons written by Chief Justice Laskin, would have held that the defences of necessity and s. 45 were available and therefore properly considered by the jury.

As a result, the Supreme Court upheld the conviction entered by the Court of Appeal and remitted the matter to the trial judge for sentencing. The trial judge imposed a sentence of eighteen months imprisonment.

Public outcry over the decision caused the federal government to introduce an amendment to the Criminal Code (commonly known as the Morgentaler Amendment) taking away the jurisdiction of appeal courts to substitute a conviction for a jury's verdict of acquittal.

Following the third jury acquittal, the Quebec government declared that the law was unenforceable and no further charges were brought.

==== Second Morgentaler challenge: 1988 ====
Upon his release from prison in Quebec, Morgentaler decided to challenge the federal abortion law in other provinces. Over the next ten years, he opened and operated private abortion clinics across the country in direct violation of the law. Following a fourth jury acquittal in 1984, the provincial Crown prosecution service appealed the decision. The Ontario Court of Appeal set aside the acquittal and ordered a re-trial.

Morgentaler, in turn, appealed to the Supreme Court of Canada. In a landmark decision, the Supreme Court declared in 1988 the entirety of the country's abortion law to be unconstitutional: R. v. Morgentaler. By a 5-2 decision, the Court held that section 251 of the Criminal Code was of no force or effect because it violated section 7 of the Canadian Charter of Rights and Freedoms. Section 7 states that: "Everyone has the right to life, liberty, and the security of the person, and the right not to be deprived thereof, except in accordance with the principles of fundamental justice." The Court also held that the infringement could not be justified under s. 1 of the Charter, which in some cases allows a government to provide a reasonable justification for an infringement.

There was no single majority judgment. Chief Justice Dickson, Justice Beetz, and Justice Wilson all wrote decisions finding the law to be unconstitutional, but for varying reasons in support. Justice McIntyre wrote the dissenting opinion.

Chief Justice Dickson held that "[f]orcing a woman, by threat of criminal sanction, to carry a fetus to term unless she meets certain criteria unrelated to her own priorities and aspirations" infringed the woman's right to security of the person, as protected by s. 7 of the Charter. Justice Wilson found that the law "asserts that the woman's capacity to reproduce is to be subject, not to her own control, but to that of the state" which similarly breached the right to security of the person.

Having found that law infringed the right to security of the person, the majority then considered whether that infringement was consistent with the principles of fundamental justice, which is the second branch of s. 7 of the Charter. The judges in the majority agreed that the procedural requirements to obtain an abortion, as set forth in the law, were especially troublesome. Only accredited or approved hospitals could perform abortions, which imposed a barrier to local access. The law also specified that women wanting an abortion were required to obtain approval from a "therapeutic abortion committee" in a hospital. The committee was composed of at least three physicians appointed by the hospital's board of members, and did not include the practitioner who was to perform the procedure. The court found that the committee requirement was deeply flawed, in part because of the long delays caused by the committees and that in many hospitals, the committees were merely committees on paper and did not actually approve abortions.

Chief Justice Dickson held that "the structure – the system regulating access to therapeutic abortions – is manifestly unfair. It contains so many potential barriers to its own operation that the defence it creates will in many circumstances be practically unavailable to women who would prima facie qualify..." Noted barriers included a lack of hospitals with committees, doctors who did not wish to refer matters to committees, the lack of a standard meaning for "health" leading to inconsistent standards among committees, and geographical and financial differentials in treatment. He concluded the provision violated the principles of fundamental justice.

The majority of the court in Morgentaler did not find it necessary to consider whether there was a substantive right to abortion under Section 7. Justice Wilson was of the opinion that such a right existed, but the other judges in the majority made their decision on procedural grounds, relating to the insufficiencies in the committee process.

=== Attempts at a new law ===
Following the 1988 Supreme Court decision, the Mulroney government made two attempts to enact a new abortion law.

In the spring of 1988, the government first attempted to find a compromise solution that would give easy access to abortion in the early stages of pregnancy and criminalize late term ones. The motion in the House of Commons was defeated 147 to 76, voted against by both MPs who opposed easy access to abortions and those who opposed adding any abortion rules to the Criminal Code.

The Supreme Court decision became an important issue in the 1988 federal election later that fall. Both the Progressive Conservative and Liberal parties were sharply divided on the issue and neither party advanced a concrete platform on the abortion issue. Prime Minister Brian Mulroney declared he was opposed to "abortion on demand", but gave no details on what that meant legally. Liberal leader John Turner stated that MPs should be allowed to vote their conscience, but refused to give his own opinion on the issue. NDP leader Ed Broadbent had a firm position that abortion is a medical matter, not a criminal one, and should be left to a woman and her doctor. The Mulroney government was returned in the 1988 election.

==== Bill C-43 (1989–1990) ====
On 3 November 1989, Minister of Justice Doug Lewis introduced Bill C-43 (titled An Act respecting abortion), a much stricter bill, in the House of Commons. If enacted, it would ban all abortions unless a doctor ruled the woman's life or health would be threatened. Anyone found in violation of the law could be imprisoned for up to two years. On May 29, 1990, the House of Commons passed the new bill by nine votes, with the cabinet being whipped in favour and most anti-abortion members supporting it. Both pro-life and pro-choice advocates have voted against the bill.

House of Commons third reading vote on Bill C-43 (An Act respecting abortion)
Party	Yea	Nay	Abstention	Absent
Progressive Conservative	136	15	None	13
Liberals	2	72	None	8
New Democratic	0	42	None	1
Reform	0	1	None	0
Independents	2	1	None	0
Total	140	131	0	22

In June 1990, a teenager from Kitchener, Ontario, was injured during a botched abortion performed in a man's home. Several days later, on June 13, a Toronto woman, Yvonne Jurewicz, died from a self-induced, coat-hanger abortion. These cases were reported in the news and the latter case was discussed at multiple levels of government. Speaking in the Legislative Assembly of British Columbia, New Democratic MLA Darlene Marzari pointed out:

For our purposes, though technically speaking the bill has not been proclaimed, Bill C-43 is, in the minds of the public and in the minds of women, now law. In fact, while we're dancing on the head of a pin and counting ourselves as angels, a woman in Toronto has died—she bled to death—three weeks ago. Her name was Yvonne Jurewicz, she was 20 years old and was probably afraid to go to the doctor and afraid to go to the hospital after she tried to abort herself. This is the sad fact of Bill C-43. While we debate the minor points of whether or not the Lieutenant Governor or the Governor-General of Canada has picked it up, we know that young women in this country are under the impression they will be considered criminals if they show up in an emergency ward door hemorrhaging.

Reform Party MP Deborah Grey, who supported the bill, denied that this death, the first known death from illegal abortion in Ontario in twenty years, could have anything to do with the publicity surrounding the passing of Bill C-43. But in Ontario, the connection was made. Richard Johnston, MPP suggested to Premier David Peterson that Ontario announce it would not start any third-party prosecutions against women or doctors, to prevent any further tragedies and to reassure doctors that they could go on providing services to the women of Ontario.

A few months later, the bill failed in the Senate on a tie vote. Under the rules of the Constitution in Section 36 of the Constitution Act, 1867, a tie meant the measure was defeated. The defeat was somewhat unexpected since it was the first time since 1941 that the Senate, whose members are appointed, had outright defeated legislation passed by the House. Eike-Henner Kluge, the director of the Canadian Medical Association ethics and legal affairs committee, viewed that the bill was flawed ethically. Kluge drafted an analysis for a Senate committee about Bill C-43 and his presentation may have swayed two votes to change resulting in a tie vote which resulted in the Senate not passing the Bill C-43.^{[5]}

In the wake of the controversy surrounding passage of the Goods and Services Tax the Progressive Conservative government did not wish to provoke a contest of wills with the Senate and announced it would not re-introduce the legislation. The fact that no subsequent government has re-visited this decision has led to the situation of Canada having no criminal abortion law. Abortion is now treated like any other medical procedure, governed by provincial and medical regulations.

=== Later cases relating to abortion ===
The court in Morgentaler did not consider the question of whether the unborn were included in the "everyone" who have the right to life. At that time, another case before the courts would have raised that issue; it was brought by Joe Borowski, a former member of the Legislative Assembly of Manitoba. However, after the Morgentaler decision, the Supreme Court held, in Borowski v Canada (AG), that his case was moot since Morgentaler had struck down the provisions Borowski was challenging.

Two further cases, Tremblay v. Daigle and R. v. Sullivan, relied on the born alive rule, inherited from English common law, to determine that the fetus was not a person: Sullivan could not be charged with murder of a fetus and Tremblay could not seek standing in court as the guardian of a fetus. The 1989 Supreme Court of Canada case of Tremblay v Daigle is one of the most widely publicized cases concerning abortion in Canada after the law prohibiting abortions was overturned by the Supreme Court of Canada. Daigle's ex-boyfriend obtained a restraining order against her having an abortion. While the restraining order was issued in Quebec, it was legally restricting Canada-wide. The Supreme Court of Canada ruled that only the woman could make the choice; the man had no legal say in a woman's choice to terminate a pregnancy or carry it to completion.

Daigle had already had a late second-term abortion before the Court ruled on her case. While the case was fast-tracked, the progress was so slow that Daigle would have been in the third-trimester had she waited for the ruling to be handed down. Daigle had an abortion in the United States while the case was before the Supreme Court of Canada. This was not made public until after the ruling, although it was not unexpected. This is in contrast to the Roe v. Wade case in the United States where Roe had carried the pregnancy to term. That case, however, was different from the Tremblay v. Daigle case in that it was about whether abortion was legal. In the Tremblay v. Daigle case, the question was whether a male partner has a say in whether a woman can obtain an abortion ruling.

Two further cases addressed the "interest in the fetus". In Dobson (Litigation Guardian of) v. Dobson, a grandfather attempted to act on behalf of a child born with cerebral palsy, supposedly resulting from a car accident in which the mother was the driver. He attempted to sue the mother with negligence in driving. The mother was in favour of the suit succeeding as it would have provided her with funds to raise her disabled child; her insurance company was defending the suit through subrogation. Citing the case of Kamloops v. Nielsen, the Court decided that courts cannot impose a duty of care on a pregnant woman toward her fetus because it would interfere with the exercise of her autonomy rights during pregnancy and faced difficulty in defining a standard of care in pregnancy. Only a legislature can do this. In Winnipeg Child & Family Services (Northwest Area) v. G. (D.F.), the Supreme Court determined that a pregnant woman addicted to solvents could not be civilly committed for treatment.

=== Case law ===
- Abortion trial of Emily Stowe (1879)
- Eastview Birth Control Trial (1936)
- Azoulay v The Queen (1952)
- Morgentaler v The Queen (1976)
- R. v. Morgentaler (1988)
- Borowski v Canada (AG) (1989)
- Tremblay v. Daigle (1989)
- R. v. Morgentaler (1993)

== Accessibility and methods ==
Color-coded map illustrating availability of abortion in Canada, in weeks of embryonic age (from fertilization). Abortion is legal at all stages in Canada, but availability is subject to medical guidelines. Available first 12 weeks (PEI) Available first 13 weeks Available first 16 weeks Available first 19 weeks Available first 20 weeks Available first 24 weeks Available first 25 weeks

Surgical and non-invasive medical abortions in Canada are provided on request for any reason, are confidential for all ages and funded by Medicare; to those who are covered by provincial/territorial medical care plans (depending on the province or territory, this always includes Canadian citizens and permanent residents, but may vary on inclusion of international students, workers, and protected persons or refugee claimants). For those not covered by a medical care plan (e.g. Americans in states that prohibit abortion after the decision in Dobbs v. Jackson Women's Health Organization), the federal government has committed to letting them obtain abortions in Canada without restriction. However, this will be contingent on their being able to pay for travel costs and the procedure themselves.

Nationally, abortion is legal through all nine months (40 weeks) of pregnancy, nevertheless no providers in Canada offer care beyond 23 weeks and 6 days. Restrictions are based on professional medical guidelines, resources available (equipment, trained personnel) and individual facility mandates makes access to all types of services vary by region within each province and territory. Each province and territory regulates and funds their own healthcare system. The federal government provides funding to each province and territory, provided they comply with the requirements of the Canada Health Act. One of those requirements is comprehensiveness, which means that all insured health services defined by the Act must be covered by a provincial or territorial health plan for that province or territory to receive federal funds. Abortion is not specifically mentioned in the Canada Health Act. It is simply included in the broad definition of "insured health services", just like other medical and surgical procedures.

One-third of hospitals perform surgical abortions, and these perform two-thirds of surgical abortions in the country. The remaining surgical abortions are performed by public and private clinics. Medical abortions are available in Canada using medications such as methotrexate, misoprostol, or mifepristone. Mifepristone used in combination with misoprostol (brand name Mifegymiso) was approved for use in Canada when prescribed by a doctor on July 29, 2015. In 2017 the approval expanded to include prescribing abilities to nurse practitioners, midwives and pharmacist based on provincial regulations, and it may be dispensed by pharmacists directly to the patient.

Nationwide information is provided by advocacy associations such as the Abortion Rights Coalition of Canada and National Abortion Federation that maintain detailed lists of abortion clinics by province and the maximum gestational period that the clinic will provide abortion types up to. These sites also provide information on how to obtain medication involving medical abortions, how to obtain financial support for travel/accommodation expenses, after-treatment supplies, child care and various other needs.

=== Accessibility by province and territory ===
There is no abortion law in Canada, but provincial and territorial health regulations and professional bodies restrict the procedure to various grounds or gestational limits. There are also significant disparities between rural and urban access to abortion.
Region	Gestational limits	# of providers	Notes
Alberta	20 weeks	5	The province has abortion services accessible in Edmonton and Calgary. All abortion services are offered.
British Columbia	23 weeks and 6 days	24	The province is governed by the Access to Abortion Services Act, which limits political demonstrations outside abortion-providing facilities, doctor's offices, and doctor's homes to set distances. BC Women's Hospital & Health Centre can provide late-term abortions in Vancouver up until the 25th week of pregnancy (its CARE Program). There are six abortion clinics throughout the province that can be accessed without a doctor referral and upwards of 30 hospitals that are required to perform abortions with a doctor's referral.
Manitoba	19 weeks and 6 days	4	The province has limited access for those in rural communities. Aspiration or surgical procedures are available for up to 19 weeks and 6 days. Medical abortions up to 9 weeks.
New Brunswick	16 weeks	5	New Brunswick does not use public funding to pay for abortion services outside of hospital settings. This means that abortions provided in clinics are not funded by the government.
Newfoundland and Labrador	15 weeks	4	Planned Parenthood Newfoundland and Labrador is the only sexual health clinic in the province. Full spectrum doula services.
Northwest Territories	19 weeks and 6 days	1	Northern Options for Women (abbreviated as NOW) provides both medical and surgical abortion services in the Northwest Territories and Nunavut.
Nova Scotia	16 weeks	11	In Nova Scotia, there is an abortion clinic in Halifax or someone needing an abortion can call the abortion helpline for other options throughout the province that may be closer to them.
Nunavut	12 weeks	2	All abortions must be performed in a hospital.
Ontario	23 weeks and 6 days	38	Intimidation of and interference with patients or providers are illegal in "safe access zones" around abortion-providing clinics and other requesting health care facilities; the offices (on request) of providing doctors, nurses, pharmacists and some other providers; and providers' homes under the Safe Access to Abortion Services Act, 2017. There are nine regions in Ontario where abortion is available with full spectrum doula services.
Prince Edward Island	12 weeks and 6 days	1	Prince Edward Island offers in province abortions up until 12 weeks and 6 days pregnant. After that limit, an out of province surgical abortion would have to be performed. A referral must be obtained through a PEI physician prior to any surgical procedure.
Quebec	23 weeks and 6 days	49	The province has a multitude of options for abortion access. Historically, late-term abortions (beyond 30 weeks) had to be performed in the US with all expenses paid by the Quebec government. This changed in 2020 because of Covid travel restrictions.
Saskatchewan	18 weeks and 6 days	3	Few resources available to those in rural areas.
Yukon	12 weeks and 6 days	1	Whitehorse General Hospital is the only location in Yukon available for both medical and early aspiration abortions.

== Politics ==
As of 2024, all federally represented political parties in Canada, as well as their leaders, support continued legal abortion access in Canada. While elected members of the Bloc Québécois, New Democratic Party, the Liberal Party of Canada, and the Green Party of Canada nearly universally support abortion rights and all these parties' MPs would be expected to vote against any hypothetical Bills that would restrict or limit abortion rights in any way, the Conservative Party of Canada has both members who favour abortion rights and members who oppose them and has stated that members would be allowed to vote their conscience on any vote concerning abortion. In the past, more Conservative members have been against abortion.

The Conservative Party has had to wrestle with combining the conflicting social policies of its two predecessor parties, the moderate right-wing Progressive Conservative Party and the more right-wing Canadian Alliance, which merged in 2003. Many socially conservative Alliance supporters were angered at the prospect of Belinda Stronach, who favoured abortion rights, winning the leadership election in early 2004, while in contrast, some Progressive Conservative supporters objected during the 2004 federal election to the new party's perceived openness to legislation that would restrict abortion rights. In the March 2005 policy convention, in a narrow vote, the party voted to not introduce legislation on the subject of abortion (members can still introduce private members bills on the issue), although it condemns sex-selective abortions. The party's stance on abortion is frequently voted on at the party's policy conventions. Motion 312 was introduced by Conservative MP Stephen Woodworth in 2012, calling for a House of Commons committee to determine when human life begins, but was defeated 203–91. In 2013, Conservative MP Mark Warawa introduced a motion condemning discrimination against females through sex-selective abortion. In 2021, Conservative Cathay Wagantall introduced a private member's bill that would prohibit a medical practitioner from performing a sex-selective abortion. Although the bill was defeated 248-82, a majority of Conservative MPs voted in favour of the bill.

Until recently, the Liberal Party had a few anti-abortion MPs, such as Liberal MP Paul Steckle introduced a bill that would have made abortion after 20 weeks gestation a criminal act in June 2006. Former Liberal Leader Justin Trudeau required that all Liberal party candidates will have to vote according to the party's abortion-rights policy when he assumed leadership of the Liberal Party in 2013.

Although the issue of abortion rights has popped up from time to time in federal elections as a wedge issue, the issue is consistently rated as a low priority for most Canadians. The Christian Heritage Party of Canada claims to be Canada's only stated anti-abortion federal political party and supports a total abortion ban in Canada. However, they never had a member elected to parliament and won about only 0.05% of the vote in the 2021 Canadian federal election. The People's Party of Canada supported banning abortion in Canada after 24 weeks of pregnancy, with exceptions for cases in which the life of the pregnant individual is in danger, serious fetal abnormalities, and when the pregnancy is a result of rape. In 2025, the party further supported significant abortion restrictions after the first trimester.

On October 19, 2012, anti-abortion protester Patricia Maloney expressed concern over 491 cases of live-birth abortions between 2000 and 2009. The finding reported to Statistics Canada did not include detailed information on how long each fetus survived after removal or how many would have been possible to save. Canada, unlike the United States, does not specifically have a law confirming or denying the legal rights of a baby who survives abortion. On January 23, 2013, Conservative MPs Wladyslaw Lizon, Leon Benoit, and Maurice Vellacott wrote a letter requesting that the RCMP investigate how many of the 491 live-birth abortions meet the definition of homicide set forth in the Criminal Code. When CBC and The Canadian Press used the phrase "investigate all abortions performed after 19 weeks gestation", Vellacott accused the media outlets of false reporting and acknowledged that abortion in Canada is fully legal. The CBC / Canadian Press story was subsequently corrected. The move drew approval from Dr. Eike-Henner Kluge, former director of ethics and legal affairs for the Canadian Medical Association, who said that doctors should "do the best [they] can for what is now a person in the eyes of the law". However, Dr. Douglas Black, president of the Society of Obstetricians and Gynaecologists, said that the situation is not one of homicide, but rather allowing fetuses "to pass away, depending on what the circumstances are, sometimes in their mom's arms".

== Opinion polls ==
- In a March 2010 EKOS poll, a majority of Canadians (52%) describe themselves as "pro-choice" while just over one in four (27%) describe themselves as "pro-life". One in ten respondents (10%) describe themselves as neither "pro-choice" nor "pro-life", and 11% did not respond.
- In an IPSOS poll conducted in 2017, 77% said abortions should be permitted, which is higher than the global average of 71%. A majority of Canadians (53%) said abortion should be permitted whenever a woman decides she wants to abort, while 24% favoured access under only some circumstances, such as when a woman has been raped. A further 7% believed that abortion should only be permitted when a woman's life is in danger, and 5% believed the procedure should be illegal under any circumstance; 11% said they were unsure.
- In a 2020 DART & Maru/Blue Voice Canada poll, 75% of Canadians said they were “satisfied” with Canada's abortion policies and 25% were not satisfied. The strongest satisfaction was found in Québec (85%), followed by British Columbia (75%), Ontario (72%), Alberta (70%), Atlantic Canada (68%), and Manitoba and Saskatchewan (70%). Satisfaction with Canada's policies were nearly identical across gender and age groups, with slightly higher favourability amongst middle and high-income Canadians as compared with those earning less than CDN$50,000 (78% vs. 74%). In the poll, 71% of Canadians said that the government should not re-open the issue, and just 10% said they should re-open it; 8% professed indifference. Canadians were almost equally split on whether they thought the government should even discuss creating a regulatory framework for abortion. 70% of Canadians said they found abortion acceptable, vs. 10% who found it unacceptable; 11% professed indifference, and 10% said they didn't know.
- In a 2020 IPSOS poll, support for abortion rights were slightly stronger than in 2017: 59% of Canadians said that abortion should be permitted whenever a woman wants one, with 18% saying it should only be permitted under limited circumstances (such as after rape), and 6% saying it should only be legal if the mother's life were in danger; just 4% said it should not be legal under any circumstances, while 13% either said they didn't know or that they preferred not to express an opinion.
- A 2022 poll by Research Co found that 44% of Canadians believe that abortion should be legal under any circumstances, 37% think that abortion should be legal only under certain circumstances, and 10% think that abortion should be illegal in all circumstances. Support for legal abortion under any circumstances was highest in Quebec (50%), then Saskatchewan and Manitoba (47%), British Columbia (46%), the Maritime provinces (43%), Alberta (40%), and Ontario (39%). Support for legal abortion under any circumstances was highest among self-identified NDP voters (57%), followed by Liberal voters (48%), and Conservative voters (32%).
- A 2022 poll by the Angus Reid Institute found that 52% of Canadians describe themselves as being completely pro-choice, while 8% describe themselves as being completely pro-life, and 41% describe themselves as being somewhere in between these two positions.

== Abortion rights movement ==
The abortion rights movement in Canada focuses on establishing abortion as a component of provincial health care plans, to ensure it is available in all regions, especially for those who couldn't afford it otherwise.

Dr. Henry Morgentaler was widely seen as the one individual personifying the Canadian abortion rights movement, but organizations such as the Canadian Abortion Rights Action League (CARAL), Canadians for Choice, and the Pro-Choice Action Network also contributed significantly to advancing the abortion rights movement in Canada. CARAL folded, and was replaced by the Abortion Rights Coalition of Canada, whose focus is on the objectives mentioned above. Feminist or pro-feminism organizations also contribute to promote the abortion rights approach.

The Canadian affiliate of Planned Parenthood, now known as the Canadian Federation for Sexual Health, is also in favour of abortion rights, and while it does refer pregnant women to abortion providers, it does not have a history (unlike its American counterpart) of engaging in widespread litigation in favour of legalized abortion.

== Anti-abortion movement ==
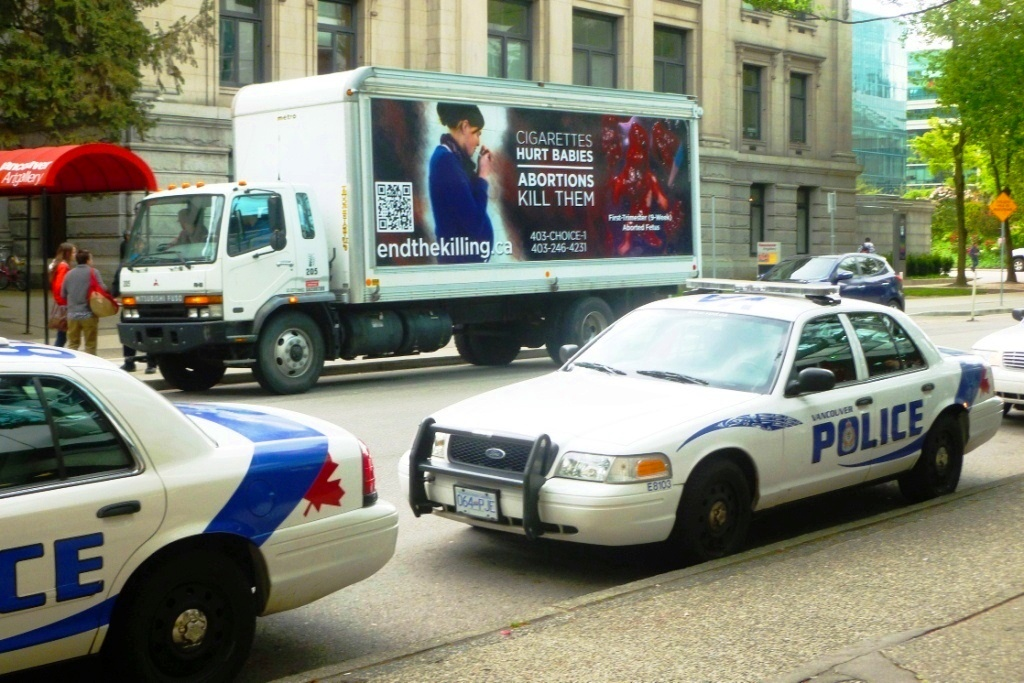
Anti-abortion ad on a truck in Vancouver, British Columbia

The anti-abortion movement, which self-identifies as the pro-life movement, disapproves of the lack of legal restrictions on abortion in Canada and of abortions being funded by provincial health care programs, even if the abortion is not for therapeutic reasons. A medical reason for obtaining an abortion is no longer required in Canada since the 1988 decision of the Supreme Court finding that the abortion provisions of the Criminal Code were unconstitutional.

The anti-abortion movement in Canada is represented by the Catholic Church, Prolife Alberta, The Wilberforce Project, Campaign Life Coalition, REAL Women of Canada, We Need A Law, Abortion in Canada, Action Life (Ottawa), Inc., among other organizations. Anti-abortion rallies or Marches for Life occur annually in Ottawa and in some provincial capitals, drawing thousands of people, although many of these marches were cancelled because of the COVID-19 pandemic.

== Violence towards abortion providers ==
- In 1983, Henry Morgentaler was attacked by a man wielding garden shears; the attack was blocked by feminist activist Judy Rebick, who was standing nearby.
- In 1992, Morgentaler's Toronto clinic was firebombed and sustained severe damage. The event occurred at night, so no one was injured, although a nearby bookstore was damaged. Appointments were switched to another clinic in Toronto and no abortions were prevented.
- On November 8, 1994, Vancouver doctor Garson Romalis was shot in the leg.
- On November 10, 1995, Dr. Hugh Short of Ancaster, Ontario, was shot in the elbow.
- On November 11, 1997, Dr. Jack Fainman of Winnipeg was shot in the shoulder.
- On July 11, 2000, Dr. Garson Romalis was stabbed by an unidentified assailant in the lobby of his clinic.

== See also ==
- Abortion laws by country
- Abortion debate
- Abortion-rights movements
- Anti-abortion movement
- Feminism in Canada
- History of Canadian women
- Human rights in Canada
- Women's suffrage in Canada
