= Therapeutic abortion committee =

Process to determine who should get an abortion

Therapeutic abortion committees (commonly known as TACs) were committees established under the Canadian Criminal Code. Each committee consisted of three medical doctors who would decide whether a request for an abortion fit within the exception to the criminal offence of procuring a miscarriage, i.e. performing an abortion. The Criminal Code only permitted lawful abortion if continuation of a pregnancy would cause a woman medical harm, as certified by a TAC. The TACs were almost always composed of men, due to fewer women practicing medicine and even fewer having these types of high level positions. These restrictions on abortion were struck down as unconstitutional by the Supreme Court of Canada in its decision in R v Morgentaler in 1988.

== Abortion law in Canada prior to 1968 ==
Prior to 1968, abortion was a criminal offence in Canada. Any woman who sought an abortion was potentially committing a criminal offence. If a doctor performed an abortion on compassionate or medical grounds, the doctor ran the risk of being prosecuted under the Criminal Code.

In many cases, judges were willing to convict but juries were unwilling to condemn any qualified medical doctor acting in good faith with the intention to protect the health of a patient.

== Introduction of therapeutic abortion committees in 1968 ==
In 1968, the federal Minister of Justice, Pierre Trudeau, introduced the Criminal Law Amendment Act, 1968–69 to amend the Criminal Code in many respects, including in relation to abortion. The bill introduced the concept of therapeutic abortion committees, which could approve abortions for medical reasons. The committees were based in hospitals and had to be composed of three doctors. The doctor who proposed to perform an abortion could not be a member of the committee which considered the request.

== Text of the law ==
Following the passage of the Criminal Law Amendment Act, 1968–69, the provisions dealing with abortion read as follows:

251. (1) Every one who, with intent to procure the miscarriage of a female person, whether or not she is pregnant, uses any means for the purpose of carrying out his intention is guilty of an indictable offence and is liable to imprisonment for life.

(2) Every female person who, being pregnant, with intent to procure her own miscarriage, uses any means or permits any means to be used for the purpose of carrying out her intention is guilty of an indictable offence and is liable to imprisonment for two years.
...
(4) Subsections (1) and (2) do not apply to

(a) a qualified medical practitioner, other than a member of a therapeutic abortion committee for any hospital, who in good faith uses in an accredited or approved hospital any means for the purpose of carrying out his intention to procure the miscarriage of a female person, or

(b) a female person who, being pregnant, permits a qualified medical practitioner to use in an accredited or approved hospital any means described in paragraph (a) for the purpose of carrying out her intention to procure her own miscarriage,

if, before the use of those means, the therapeutic abortion committee for that accredited or approved hospital, by a majority of the members of the committee and at a meeting of the committee at which the case of such female person has been reviewed,

(c) has by certificate in writing stated that in its opinion the continuation of the pregnancy of such female person would or would be likely to endanger her life or health, and

(d) has caused a copy of such certificate to be given to the qualified medical practitioner.

These were the provisions of the law which the Supreme Court ruled to be unconstitutional in R v Morgentaler.

== The law in operation ==
=== Abortion clinics not covered ===
Abortion clinics were illegal under this law; in Québec only, authorities concluded in the 1970s that the law was unenforceable after a number of unsuccessful criminal cases against doctors. Most notably Henry Morgentaler openly operated clinics as a form of civil disobedience in order to establish a judicial test case based on the legal defence of necessity.

=== Variation from hospital to hospital ===
Even within the hospital system, there were great discrepancies between what different TAC's in different hospitals would be willing to consider a risk to a woman's health.

In some hospitals, mental health problems resulting from carrying a pregnancy to term were acceptable to the TAC as endangering a woman's health. This made abortion partially accessible (albeit with at best limited access and some rather unacceptable delays) in some communities as women could claim to be suicidal and on this basis insist that continuation of the unwanted pregnancy represented an imminent danger to mental health.

In other TAC's the law was interpreted much more closely, making it difficult to get an abortion in the hospital even if they did have a TAC.

In some cases, procedures required to protect a woman's life were not available during pregnancy. A prime example would be cancer treatments such as chemotherapy which would do extensive and irreversible harm to an embryo or foetus if done during pregnancy but which, if not done in a timely fashion, can allow the cancer to spread to a point at which the condition is fatal and no longer successfully medically treatable.

These were the cases which the TAC's were originally intended to address, but many hospitals were unwilling to perform abortions at all.

=== No requirement for hospitals to provide abortions ===
Hospitals had therapeutic abortion committees only if they opted to provide abortions, and there was and is no requirement that they do so. As well, the requirement for three doctors to sit on a committee, in addition to the doctor who proposed to perform an abortion, meant that abortions were only available in hospitals where there were four doctors familiar with the procedure.

=== Net effect of the law ===
The end result was a very limited access to lawful abortion which varied widely from one town or province to another. Many towns and cities did not have any hospital that provided abortions.

== Supreme Court rules the provisions are unconstitutional ==
In 1988, a case involving Morgentaler reached the Supreme Court of Canada. The court ruled that the provisions relating to abortion were contrary to section 7 of the Canadian Charter of Rights and Freedoms. Although there was no single majority judgment, the three judgments finding the provisions unconstitutional concluded that the delays and limited access to abortion inherent in the system of therapeutic abortion committees violated the right to security of the person of a woman seeking an abortion. The delays and limited access potentially had a profound impact on a woman's health and thus infringed her rights to liberty and security of the person, contrary to section 7 of the Charter. The court held that this section of the Criminal Code was unconstitutional and inoperative. The effect of the decision was that abortion was decriminalized in Canada.

== Senate rejects attempt to re-criminalize ==
Following the Supreme Court decision, the Progressive Conservative government of Prime Minister Brian Mulroney explored legislative options in response to the decision. In 1990, a compromise bill, Bill C-34 passed the Commons. Similar to the previous requirement for approval by a TAC, it would have required the consent of one additional doctor, other than the one who proposed to perform the abortion. Although Bill C-34 passed the Commons, it was defeated in a tie vote in the Senate of Canada, marking the end of criminalisation of abortion in Canada.

== See also ==
- Abortion in Canada
