= R v Morgentaler =

1988 Supreme Court of Canada decision legalizing abortion

- Supreme Court of Canada

Hearing: October 7–10, 1986 Judgment: January 28, 1988
- Full case name: Dr Henry Morgentaler, Dr Leslie Frank Smoling and Dr Robert Scott v Her Majesty The Queen
- Citations: [1988] 1 SCR 30, 63 OR (2d) 281, 37 CCC (3d) 449, 31 CRR 1, 62 CR (3d) 1, 26 OAC 1
- Docket No.: 19556
- Prior history: Judgment for the Crown in the Court of Appeal for Ontario
- Ruling: Appeal allowed, acquittal restored

Holding
- Section 251 of the Criminal Code violates a woman's right to security of person under section 7 of the Canadian Charter of Rights and Freedoms and cannot be saved under section 1 of the Charter.

Court membership
- Chief Justice: Brian Dickson; Puisne Justices: Jean Beetz, Willard Estey, William McIntyre, Julien Chouinard, Antonio Lamer, Bertha Wilson, Gerald Le Dain, Gérard La Forest

Reasons given
- Plurality: (1) Dickson (pp. 45–80), Lamer concurring; (2) Beetz (pp. 80–132), Estey concurring; (3) Wilson (pp. 161–184)
- Dissent: McIntyre (pp. 132–161), La Forest concurring
- Chouinard and Le Dain took no part in the consideration or decision of the case.

R v Morgentaler, [1988] 1 SCR 30 is a decision of the Supreme Court of Canada which held that the abortion provision in the Criminal Code was unconstitutional because it violated women's rights to security of the person under section 7 of the Canadian Charter of Rights and Freedoms. Since this ruling, there have been no criminal laws regulating abortion in Canada.

== Background ==
Prior to this ruling, section 251(4) of the Criminal Code, allowed for abortions to be performed solely at accredited hospitals with the proper certification of approval from the hospital's Therapeutic Abortion Committee.

Three doctors, Henry Morgentaler, Leslie Frank Smoling and Robert Scott, set up an abortion clinic in Toronto for the purpose of performing abortions on women who had not received certification from the Therapeutic Abortion Committee, as required under subsection 251(4) of the Criminal Code. By doing so, they were attempting to bring public attention to their cause, claiming a woman should have complete control over the decision on whether to have an abortion.

Morgentaler had previously challenged the abortion law at the Supreme Court in the pre-Charter case of Morgentaler v The Queen, in which the court denied having the judicial authority to strike down the law.

The Court of Appeal for Ontario found in favour of the government. On appeal, the main issue put before the court was whether section 251 violated section 7 of the Charter. A secondary issue put to the court was whether the creation of anti-abortion law was ultra vires ("outside the power") of the federal government's authority to create law.

== Ruling ==
The court ruled five to two that the law violated section 7 and could not be saved under section 1. Morgentaler's previous acquittal was restored.

There were three different sets of reasons given by the five judges in the majority on the main issue. They agreed that the appeal should be allowed and the Criminal Code provision was unconstitutional. However, there was no majority decision on the reasons for that outcome, so there was not a clear precedent on the legal basis for the decision.

On the issue of jury nullification, the Court unanimously held that defence counsel's argument at trial, asking the jury not to apply the law, was improper. On that point, there was a clear legal precedent.

=== Dickson ===
Perhaps the most prominent position in the majority was that of Chief Justice Brian Dickson, with Justice Antonio Lamer concurring. Dickson began by examining section 7. He found that section 251 forced some women to carry a fetus irrespective of her own "priorities and aspirations". This was a clear infringement of security of person. He found a further violation due to the delay created by the mandatory certification procedure which put the women at higher risk of physical harm and caused harm to their psychological integrity.

In his section 7 analysis, Dickson examined whether the violation accorded with the principles of fundamental justice. He found that it did not because the excessive requirements prevented smaller hospitals from providing such services thus preventing many women from even applying for certification. Moreover, he found that the administrative system failed to provide adequate evaluation criteria which allowed the committees to grant or deny therapeutic abortions arbitrarily.

Dickson found that the violation could not be justified under section 1, focusing on the means chosen by the government to achieve its objectives. In the end, the law failed on every step of the proportionality test. First, he found the administrative process was often unfair and arbitrary. Second, the resultant impairment of the women's rights was beyond what was necessary to evaluate their case. Third, the effect of the impairment far outweighed the importance of the law's objective.

=== Beetz ===
Justice Jean Beetz, with Justice Willard Estey concurring, wrote a second set of reasons finding the abortion law invalid. In it, Beetz noted that by adopting section 251(4), the government acknowledged that the interest of the state to protect the woman is greater than its interest to protect the fetus when "the continuation of the pregnancy of such female person would or would be likely to endanger her life or health". Beetz's reasoning closely resembled that of the Chief Justice. He found a violation of section 7 as the procedural requirements of section 251 were "manifestly unfair".

Beetz's reasoning in the section 1 analysis was also similar to that of Dickson. He found that the objective had no rational connection to the means, meaning the law could not be justified. He also speculated that if the government were to enact a new abortion law, this law would require a higher degree of danger to the woman in the later months rather than the early months for an abortion to be allowed. In this case, it could be sufficiently justifiable under section 1.

In examining whether the law was ultra vires, Beetz examined sections 91 and 96 of the Constitution Act, 1867. He decided that the law was within the power of the federal government on account that the committee was not given any power over any provincial jurisdiction under section 91 nor did it function in any sort of judicial manner under section 96.

=== Wilson ===
Justice Bertha Wilson wrote her own concurring reasons taking a significantly different approach. She held that section 251 violates two rights: liberty and security of person. She emphasized how section 251 violated a woman's personal autonomy by preventing her from making decisions affecting her and her fetus' life. To Wilson, a woman's decision to abort her fetus is one that is so profound on so many levels it goes beyond being a medical decision and becomes a social and ethical one as well. By removing the women's ability to make the decision and giving it to a committee would be a clear violation of their liberty and security of person. Wilson commented that the state was effectively taking control of a woman's capacity to reproduce.

Wilson went on to agree with the other judges that section 251 (prohibiting the performance of an abortion except under certain circumstances) is procedurally unfair, adding that the violation of section 7 also has the effect of violating section 2(a) of the Charter (freedom of conscience) in that the requirements for a woman to be permitted to obtain an abortion legally (or for a doctor to legally perform one) were in many cases so onerous or effectively impossible that they were "resulting in a failure to comply with the principles of fundamental justice". The decision to abort is primarily a moral one, she noted, and therefore by preventing her from doing so, the decision violates a woman's right to conscientiously-held beliefs. With the abortion law, the government was supporting one conscientiously-held belief at the expense of another, and in effect, was treating women as a means to an end and depriving them of their "essential humanity".

Wilson also stated that

The decision whether to terminate a pregnancy is essentially a moral decision, a matter of conscience. I do not think there is or can be any dispute about that. The question is: whose conscience? Is the conscience of the woman to be paramount or the conscience of the state? I believe, for the reasons I gave in discussing the right to liberty, that in a free and democratic society it must be the conscience of the individual.

In her analysis of section 1, Wilson noted the value placed on the fetus is proportional to its stage of gestation and the legislation must take that into account. However, here, the law cannot be justified because it takes the decision-making power away from the woman absolutely and therefore cannot pass the proportionality test.

== Dissent ==
A dissent was written by Justice William McIntyre, with Justice Gérard La Forest concurring. McIntyre found that there was no right to an abortion under section 7 nor under other laws. His argument was based on the role of judicial review and how the courts must not go about creating rights not explicitly found in the Charter nor interpret Charter rights to protect interests that the rights were not initially intending to protect. He said that nowhere in any constitutional texts, history or philosophies is there support for any such rights. Furthermore, there is no societal consensus that these interests should be protected either.

Even if a right could be found, said McIntyre, the case would not have been sufficient to prove a violation. The provisions of section 251(4) cannot be said to be "manifestly unfair" on the basis that some women do not have access. The problems with administrative procedure are external to the legislation and cannot be the basis of a violation.

== Aftermath ==
When the decision was announced, it was sometimes reported to be more broad than it was; the decision did not declare a constitutional right to abortion nor "freedom of choice".

The Progressive Conservative government of Prime Minister Brian Mulroney made two attempts to pass a new abortion law. The first proposal, in the spring of 1988, did not pass the House of Commons. The second attempt, introduced by the Minister of Justice as Bill C-43 in late 1989, was defeated on a tie vote by the time it came to third reading in Senate on January 31, 1991, leaving Canada without criminal legislation governing abortion.

As of 2026, Parliament had not acted to replace the abortion law, meaning Canada does not criminalize abortion. Provinces have taken action to restrict access to abortion in various ways that do not involve criminal law.

At the 25th anniversary of the decision in early 2013, and upon Morgentaler's death three months later, the extent and nature of Morgentaler was discussed in the media.

== See also ==
- List of Supreme Court of Canada cases (Dickson Court)
- The later case of Tremblay v Daigle (1989), which established that a fetus has no legal status in Canada as a person in common law or in Quebec statutes.
