= Feminism in Canada =

The history of feminism in Canada has been a gradual struggle aimed at establishing equal rights. The history of Canadian feminism, like modern Western feminism in other countries, has been divided by scholars into four "waves", each describing a period of intense activism and social change. The use of "waves" has been critiqued for its failure to include feminist activism of Aboriginal and Québécois women who organized for changes in their own communities as well as for larger social change.

== Waves of Canadian feminism ==
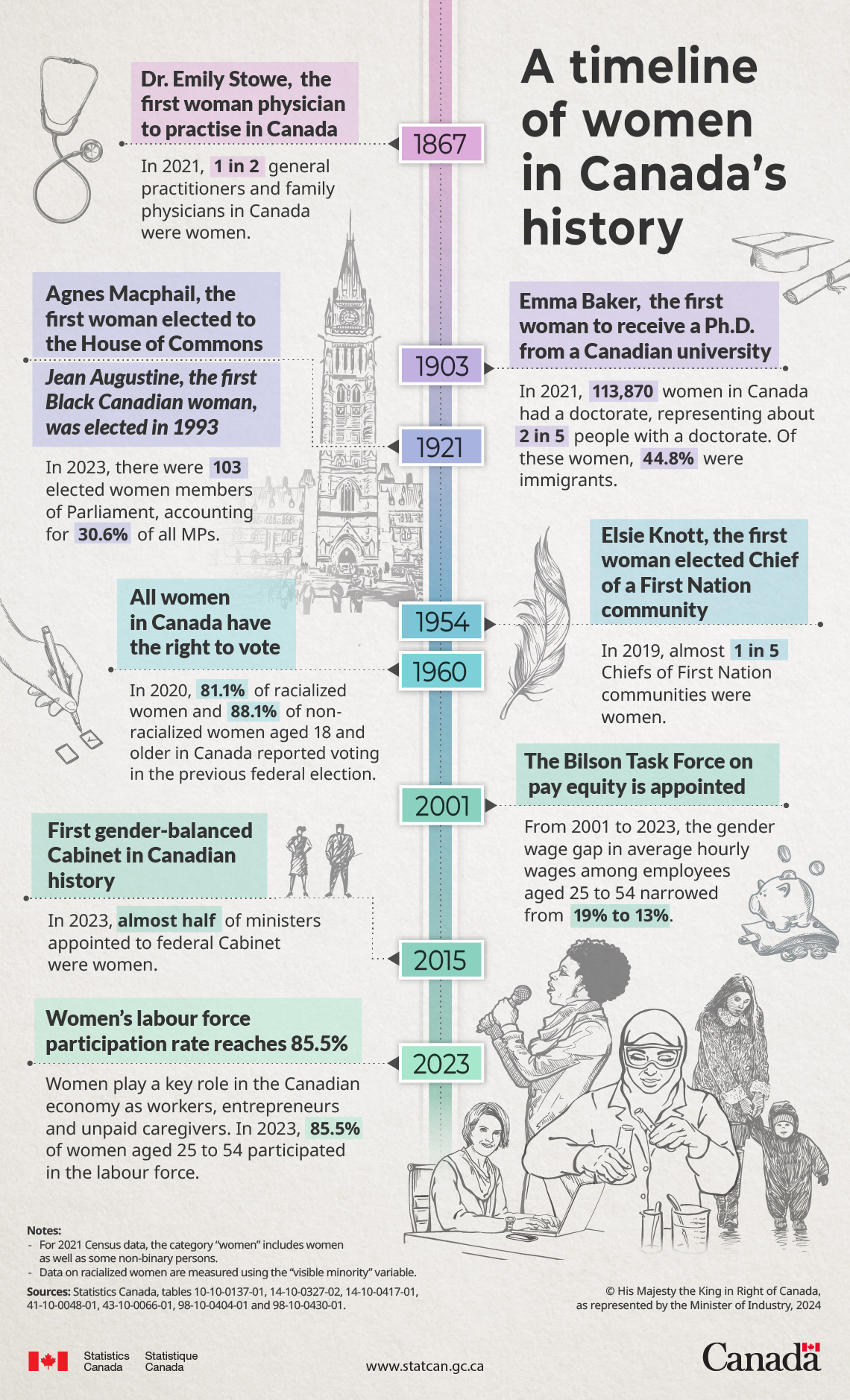

=== First wave ===
The first wave of feminism in Canada occurred in the late 19th and early 20th centuries. This early activism was focused on increasing women's role in public life, with goals including women's suffrage, increased property rights, increased access to education, and recognition as "persons" under the law. This early iteration of Canadian feminism was largely based in maternal feminism: the idea that women are natural caregivers and "mothers of the nation" who should participate in public life because of their perceived propensity for decisions that will result in good care of society. In this view, women were seen to be a civilizing force on society, which was a significant part of women's engagement in missionary work and in the Woman's Christian Temperance Union (WCTU).

The first wave in Canada was different in Québec. Although the first wave was developed at an earlier time, many women in Québec had to wait until April 1940 for their right to vote and run in elections.

Canadian women's social, political, and cultural roles and influence changed dramatically during WWII. Women had taken over many of the missing roles of men while they were off at war. Women worked in factories, took over farms, and proved their importance in society.

==== Early organizing and Activism ====
Religion was an important factor in the early stages of the Canadian women's movement. Some of the earliest groups of organized women came together for a religious purpose. When women were rejected as missionaries by their Churches and missionary societies, they started their own missionary societies and raised funds to send female missionaries abroad. Some of them raised enough to train some of their missionaries as teachers or doctors.

The first of these missionary societies was founded in Canso, Nova Scotia in 1870 by a group of Baptist women inspired by Hannah Norris, a teacher who wanted to be a missionary. Norris asked the women in her Church for help when her application to the Baptist Foreign Mission Board was rejected. They formed their own missionary society, and soon there were Presbyterian, Methodist, and Anglican women missionary societies forming across the western provinces, Quebec, Ontario, and the Maritimes. These new societies not only enabled women to work as missionaries, but they also gave women the opportunity to manage the funding, training, and employment of female missionaries in foreign countries.

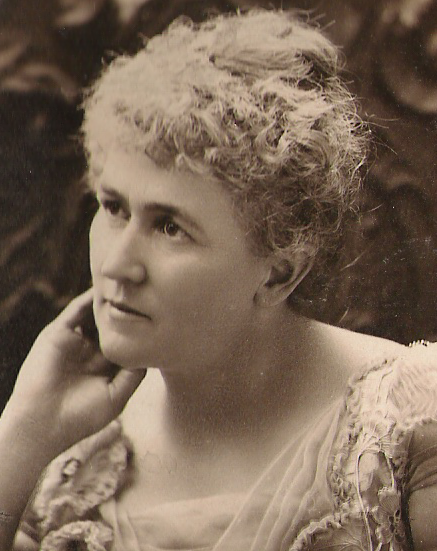
Adelaide Hoodless, co-founder of the National Council of Women of Canada

Women's religious organizing was also a means through which women could advocate social change. The Woman's Christian Temperance Union, for example, was formed in 1874 by Letitia Youmans of Picton, Ontario, in order to raise awareness of the negative consequences of alcohol consumption on society, and ultimately to ban alcohol and promote evangelical family values. Inspired by its American counterpart, the WCTU grew to become one of the first organizations to fight for suffrage while also being a training ground for future suffrage leaders. The Hebrew Ladies Sewing Circle (founded 1860) also worked to promote social change through religion-inspired organizing. It was organized in Toronto in 1906 by Ida Siegel to provide girls in their community training in sewing skills and as a response to the conversion attempts of Jewish youth by Protestant Evangelicals. It grew to establish a Jewish Endeavour Sewing School where they taught girls sewing, Jewish religion and history. in Toronto grew to establish a Jewish Endeavour Sewing School where they taught girls sewing, Jewish religion and history. Other examples include the Young Women's Christian Association (YWCA) which provided (and continues to provide) services such as reception centres, shelters, and educational programs for single working class women along with The Girls’ Friendly Society (Anglican-based), the Catholic Women's League, and the Grey Nuns of Montreal who provided daycare centres for working women.

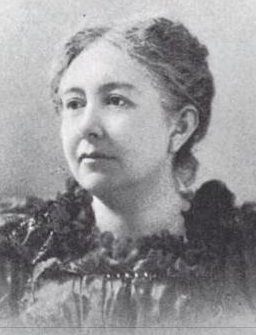
Edith Archibald

In the late nineteenth and early twentieth centuries women in Canada were also making inroads into various professions including teaching, journalism, social work, and public health. Grace Annie Lockhart became the first woman in the British Empire to receive a bachelor's degree, providing clear evidence of the justice of women's claim to full rights in the field of higher education. Advances included the establishment of a Women's Medical College in Toronto (and in Kingston, Ontario) in 1883, attributed in part to the persistence of Emily Stowe, the first female doctor to practice in Canada. Stowe's daughter, Augusta Stowe-Gullen, became the first woman to graduate from a Canadian medical school.

Women also established and became involved with organizations to advance women's rights, including suffrage. In 1893, the National Council of Women of Canada was formed which was designed to bring together representatives of different women's groups across Canada, providing a network for women to communicate their concerns and ideas. When they endorsed suffrage, in 1910, the NCWC did so on the basis that women had an indispensable role in society which should give them the right to participate in public life by electing their government, in keeping with the maternal feminism prevalent in the period.

During World War I, women took on not only traditionally feminine jobs, but also heavy work such as in munitions factories. This changed role of women increased women's political prominence, and issues such as women's suffrage were raised.

During the 1920s, women adventurers pushed the boundaries of acceptable behavior for women. From 1922 until 1929, Aloha Wanderwell (born in Canada) became the first woman to travel around the world in a car, beginning her journey at the age of 16.

==== Women's right to vote in Canada ====
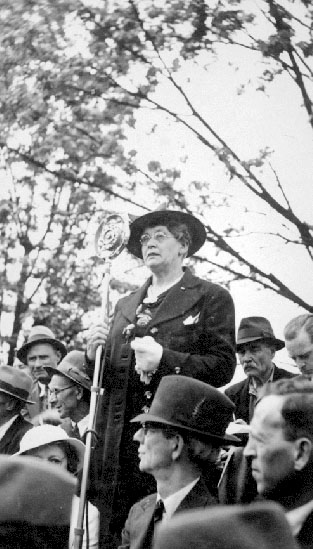
Helena Gutteridge fought for women's suffrage in BC

Organizing around women's suffrage in Canada peaked in the mid-1910s. Various franchise clubs were formed, and in Ontario, the Toronto Women's Literary Club was established in 1876 as a guise for suffrage activities, though by 1883 it was renamed the Toronto Women's Suffrage Association. Compared to other English speaking industrialized countries, Canada's suffrage movement gained success rather easily, and without violence. The tactics adopted by the movement in order to bring about reform included collecting petitions, staging mock parliaments and selling postcards.

Widows and unmarried women were granted the right to vote in municipal elections in Ontario in 1884. Such limited franchises were extended in other provinces at the end of the 19th century, but bills to enfranchise women in provincial elections failed to pass in any province until Manitoba, and Saskatchewan finally succeeded in early 1916. Alberta followed the same year and Emily Murphy became the first woman magistrate not just in Canada, but the entire British Empire. At the federal level it was a two step process. On September 20, 1917, women gained a limited right to vote: According to the Parliament of Canada website, the Military Voters Act established that "women who are British subjects and have close relatives in the armed forces can vote on behalf of their male relatives, in federal elections." About a year and a quarter later, at the beginning of 1919, the right to vote was extended to all women in the Act to confer the Electoral Franchise upon Women. The remaining provinces quickly followed suit, except for Quebec, which did not do so until 1940. Agnes Macphail became the first woman elected to Parliament in 1921.

Large numbers of women continued for many years to be excluded from the right to vote, based on race or indigeneity. British Columbia, for example, denied persons of Asian, Indian (Southeast Asian), and Indigenous origin the rights to universal adult suffrage that came about with the Dominion Elections Act of 1920.

Province	Date of Women's Suffrage	Date of Women's Ability to Hold Office
Manitoba	January 28, 1916	January 28, 1916
Saskatchewan	March 14, 1916	March 14, 1916
Alberta	April 19, 1916	April 19, 1916 (Note: First women elected in the British Empire were two Alberta women (Louise McKinney and Roberta MacAdams) elected in 1917.)
British Columbia	April 5, 1917	April 5, 1917
Ontario	April 12, 1917	April 24, 1919
Nova Scotia	April 26, 1918	April 26, 1918
New Brunswick	April 17, 1919	March 9, 1934
Prince Edward Island	May 3, 1922	May 3, 1922
Newfoundland (Note: Newfoundland was not yet a part of Canada in 1925 as it was a separate Dominion of the British Empire.)	April 13, 1925	April 13, 1925
Quebec	April 25, 1940	April 25, 1940
Dominion of Canada (federal government)	Relatives of individuals in the armed forces - September 20, 1917. All female British subjects in Canada, not included under racial or Indigenous exclusions - May 24, 1918	July 7, 1919 (Note: First woman elected to the House of Commons was Progressive candidate Agnes MacPhail, elected in 1921.)

==== Women ruled legally to be "persons" ====
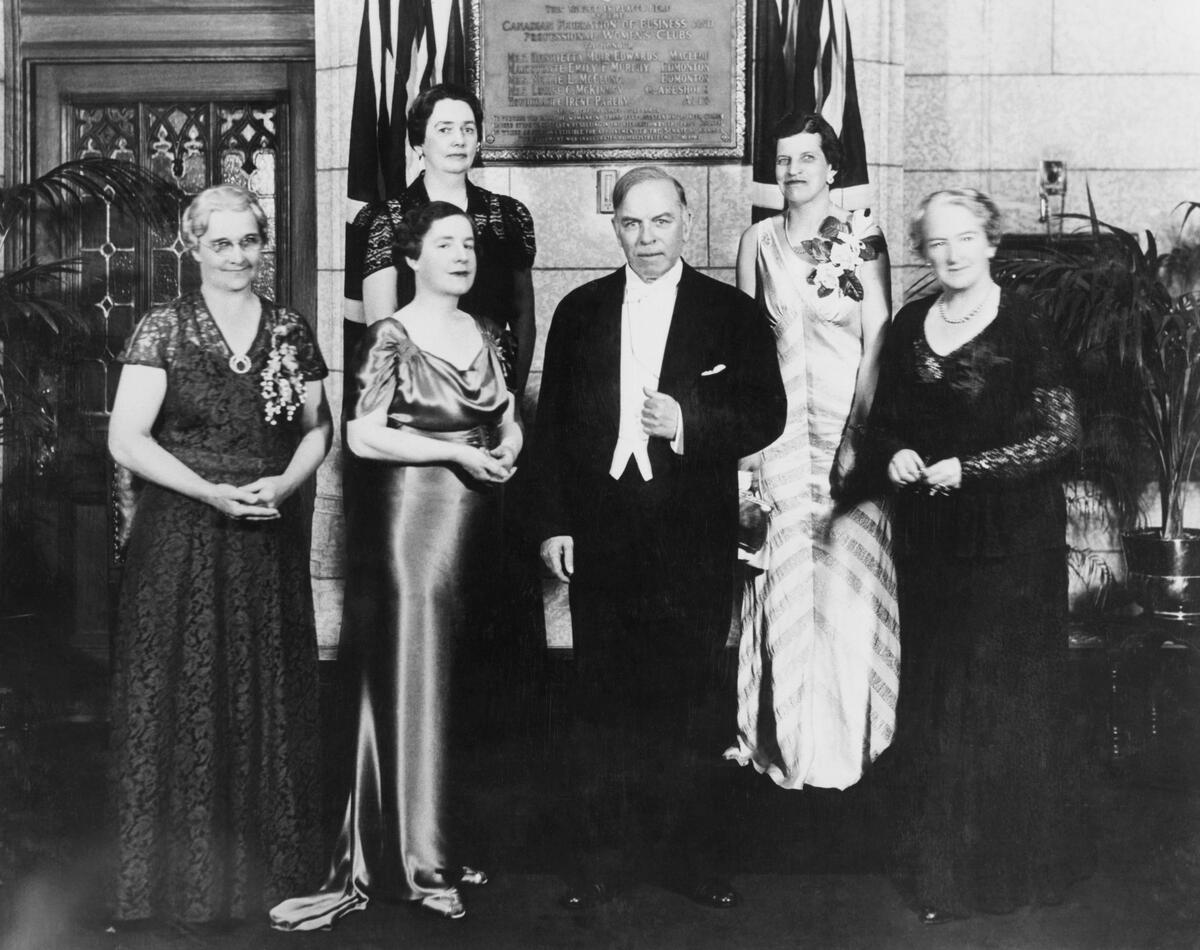
Unveiling of a plaque commemorating the five Alberta women whose efforts resulted in the Persons Case, which established the rights of women to hold public office in Canada.

The Famous Five were a group of five women from Alberta who wanted courts to determine women were considered to be "persons" for the purposes of being called to the Senate under section 24 of the British North America Act, 1867, the main provision of Canada's constitution. The Senate was the body which at that time approved divorces in some provinces of Canada, among other decisions important to women. The Famous Five petitioned the Federal Cabinet to refer this issue to the Supreme Court. After some debate, the Cabinet did so. The Supreme Court, interpreting the Act in light of the times in which it was written, ruled in 1928 that women were not "persons" for the purposes of section 24 and could not be appointed to the Senate.

The five women, led by Emily Murphy, appealed the case to the Judicial Committee of the British Privy Council, at that time the highest court of appeal for the British Empire. In 1929, the five Lords of the Committee ruled unanimously that "the word ‘persons' in Section 24 includes both the male and female sex". They called the earlier interpretation "a relic of days more barbarous than ours".

==== Eastview Birth Control Trial ====
The Eastview Birth Control Trial of 1936–1937 was the first successful legal challenge to the dissemination of information and the possession of materials relating to birth control being illegal in Canada, and it marked the beginning of a shift in Canadian society's acceptance of such practices. In September 1936, Dorothea Palmer was arrested in Eastview (now Vanier, Ontario), and charged with possessing materials and pamphlets related to birth control, then highly illegal under Canadian law. As she was working for the Kitchener-based Parents' Information Bureau (PIB), her arrest could have led to the collapse of the organization and as many as two years' imprisonment for Palmer. However, the PIB was the brainchild of industrialist A. R. Kaufman, a eugenically-minded industrialist whose support eventually saw Palmer's charges dropped. The trial lasted from September 1936 to March 1937.

Ultimately, the case was dismissed by the presiding magistrate Lester Clayon, who ruled that, as Palmer's actions were "in the public good", no charges could be held against her. In his final ruling, he explained that:

The mothers are in poor health, pregnant nine months of the year... What chance do these children have to be properly fed, clothed and educated? They are a burden on the taxpayer. They crowd the juvenile court. They glut the competitive labour market.

=== Second wave ===
Though feminism in Canada continued after the work of the Famous Five, during the Depression and the Second World War, feminist activism in Canada was not as clear to see as it was during the fight for suffrage and thereafter. However, women's engagement in the workforce during the Second World War brought about a new consciousness in women with regards to their place in public life, which led to a public inquiry on the status of women, as well as new campaigns and organizing for equal rights. Whereas the first wave was organized around access to education and training, the second wave of Canadian feminism focused on women's role in the workforce, the need for equal pay for equal work, a desire to address violence against women, and concerns about women's reproductive rights.

==== Canadian women during and after World War II ====
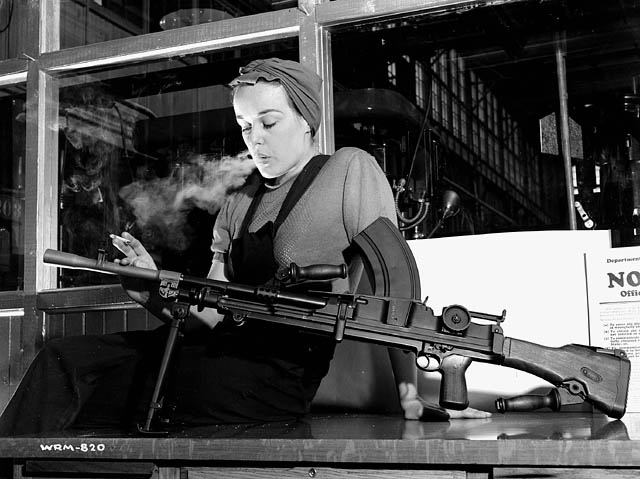
Veronica Foster, popularly known as "Ronnie, the Bren Gun Girl" on the production line. Many women worked "on the home front" during the war.

During the Second World War, Canadian women were actively pursued by the Canadian government to contribute to the war effort. One of the ways in which women contributed to the war effort was by joining the workforce. Prior to the war, some young and unmarried women had already joined the workforce; however, during the war an increased need for female workers arose in many industries due to the depleted pool of male workers who had largely been mobilized to fight in the war. Although women continued to work in their pre-war traditional fields of employment such as textile manufacturing, retail, nursing, and homecare services, as the demand for labour intensified in all industries, women became employed in many non-traditional fields including: manufacturing, trade, finance, transportation, communication, and construction.

In response to the labour needs of many industries, the Canadian government created a special Women's Division of the National Selective Service to recruit women into the workforce. The first groups of women to be recruited were single women and childless married women. The National Selective Service then recruited women with home responsibilities and later women with children. By 1944, more than one million women worked full-time in Canada's paid labour force.

The inclusion of women with children into the workforce led the federal government to develop a program known as the Dominion-Provincial Wartime Day Nurseries Agreement in order to assist working mothers with childcare during the duration of the war. Under the Agreement, the federal government offered to help the provinces subsidize childcare programs. Quebec and Ontario took advantage of the agreement and developed childcare facilities such as nurseries and after school programs.

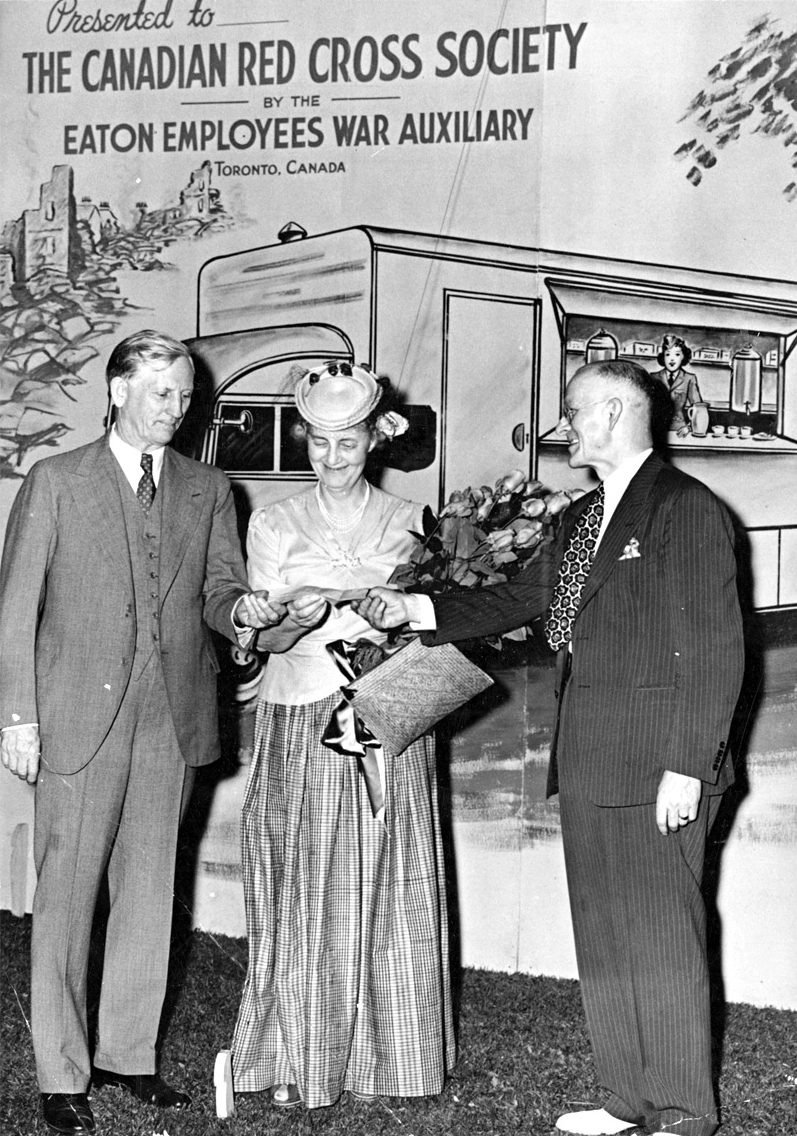
Flora Eaton presenting a cheque to the Canadian Red Cross. She was an active fundraiser and allowed Eaton Hall to be used as a military hospital for Canadian soldiers during the war.

Women also contributed to the war effort by volunteering. As soon as the war broke out, many local women's volunteer societies quickly mobilized to contribute to the war effort. Women in these organizations engaged in a range of activities including: sewing clothes for the Red Cross, cultivating "victory" gardens, and collecting materials like rubber and metal scraps for wartime production. By the middle of the war the Canadian government established the Women's Voluntary Services to coordinate the wartime activities of the local women's societies across Canada.

Women also participated in the war by joining the military. Prior to the war, with the exception of the Nursing Service of the Royal Canadian Army Medical Corps, the Canadian army was composed only of men. Yet, by 1942 women were recruited into the military, air force, and navy. In fact, by the end of the war 20,497 women were members of the army, 16,221 were members of the air force, and 6,665 were members of the navy. When women were first recruited they mostly worked in administrative and support positions such as stewardesses and clerical aides, but as the war carried on, women were promoted to more skilled positions such as motor vehicle mechanics, electricians, and sail-makers.

The Canadian government expected women to return to their roles in the home once the war ended. In 1941, the government created an Advisory Committee on Reconstruction to deal with the post-war reconstruction issues. Shortly after its creation, some Canadian women advocated for female representation within the Committee due to the vital contribution of women to the war effort. Consequently, in 1943, the government created a subcommittee to deal with issues women would encounter once the war ended. The subcommittee was headed by Margaret McWilliams, a journalist and notable women's organization activist and consisted of nine other women from across the country. The subcommittee produced a report with a number of recommendations including that women should be trained or retrained for jobs on the same basis as men and that household workers should receive labour benefits like unemployment insurance. The report received little public attention and ultimately failed to achieve any of its recommendations. However, many of its recommendations were discussed once again, decades later in the 1970 report of the Royal Commission on the Status of Women.

When the war finally ended many Canadian women did as the government expected of them and returned to their roles in the home. Additionally, when the war ended some of the services the government offered working women during the war, like childcare, were discontinued.

Yet, in the years following the war, the number of women joining the workforce steadily increased as women's contribution became more and more necessary to sustaining both the home and the economy - a fact addressed by a number of government initiatives. In 1951, the Ontario government passed the Female Employees Fair Remuneration Act, and by the end of the 1950s, all provinces except for Quebec and Newfoundland and Labrador had passed similar legislation. In 1954, the Government of Canada created a specialized women's department within the Department of Labour, and in 1956, it also passed legislation providing pay equity for women working in the federal civil service.

==== Royal Commission on the Status of Women, 1970 ====
The Royal Commission on the Status of Women was a Canadian Royal Commission that examined the status of women and recommended steps that might be taken by the federal government to ensure equal opportunities with men in all aspects of Canadian society. The Commission commenced on 16 February 1967 as an initiative of Prime Minister Lester B. Pearson. Public sessions were conducted the following year to accept public comment for the Commission to consider as it formulated its recommendations. Florence Bird was the Commission's chair. The Commissioners appointed were: Florence Bird (chairperson), Elsie MacGill, Lola M. Lange, Jeanne Lapointe, Doris Ogilvie, Donald R. Gordon, Jr (resigned from Commission), Jacques Henripin, John Peters Humphrey (appointed following Gordon's resignation).

==== The National Union of Students and the Women's Movement in the 1970s ====
The National Union of Students (Canada) (NUS) formed in 1972 and became the Canadian Federation of Students in 1981. While student aid, education cut-backs and, by the late 1970s, tuition fees may have been the primary policy concerns of the national student organization, there was a definite undercurrent of women student organizing in NUS and on local campuses. Women and some men supporters rallied around issues of sexism on student councils and in NUS, violence against women, abortion rights and the establishing women centres and daycare on campuses. By 1979, NUS established the Declaration of the Rights of the Woman Student. As Moses points out (p. 89), the "Declaration avoided discussion of other serious social inclusions — issues of race, physical ability, and aboriginal people were not included" which perhaps speaks to why issues of racism and ability caused much discordance in the women's movement of the 1980s.

Moses (2010, pp. 76–77) cites several key sources on the long history of women student organizing in Canada going back to the late 1800s and suggests that "NUS women's student activism of the 1970s should not be viewed as an entirely new phenomenon arising amidst the clamour and legacy of 1960s liberation struggles". "Throughout the 1950s and 1960s, women's participation in [the Canadian Union of Students and its predecessor, the National Federation of Canadian University Students stayed consistent: around the 15–17 percent mark." Moses (2010, p. 92, note 34).

The link between women students and late 1960s women's movements has been widely acknowledged. Yet, as Moses points out, this acknowledgement stops abruptly after 1971; the activism of youth and students was widely ignored in the historiography of women's movement in the 1970s. This is not something that Moses attempts to explain. It would seem likely that the gap in recognition has something to do with how young women and how women historiographers of the 1970s identified; that is, not as students or youth per se, but as women. While the women's movement of the 1970s was of course, multigenerational, it was also most certainly in many ways, a significant youth movement and this, as Moses (2010) suggests, has not been well understood and acknowledged.

==== Violence against women and the Battered Women's Movement ====
The Battered Women's Shelter Movement in Canada emerged predominantly during the late 1960s and early 1970s, within the framework of second wave feminism. Building on the oft-used second wave slogan, "the personal is political", second wave understandings of the state's role in regulating private life paved the road for a re-conceptualization of domestic violence as a social problem as opposed to a completely private matter. The movement was generated in large part because for women who had experienced domestic violence, "there was no place to go." However, several feminists have criticized the Battered Women's movement for its reliance on the battered woman-as-victim archetype.

==== National Action Committee on the Status of Women ====
The National Action Committee (NAC) was formed as a result of the frustration of women at the inaction of the federal government in regards to the recommendations of the Royal Commission. Beginning in 1972 as a coalition of 23 women's groups, by 1986 it had 350 organizational members, including the women's caucuses of the three biggest political parties. Partly funded by government grants, the NAC was widely regarded as the official expression of women's interests in Canada, and received a lot of attention from the media. In 1984 there was a televised debate on women's issues among the leaders of the contending political parties during the federal election campaign. The NAC and women's issues were receiving a lot of attention and the NAC was rapidly growing, although beginning in 1983 it had competition from REAL Women of Canada, a right-wing lobby group.

==== Canadian Human Rights Act, 1977 ====
Passed by prime minister of the time, Pierre Trudeau, the Canadian Human Rights Act gave basic rights to all humans. There was no discrimination based on sex, race, religion etc.... It specified that there must be "equal pay for work of equal value". There had been significant disparity between the pay received by women and by men. However, by the mid-1980s there was still disparity: full-time female employees earned on average only 72% of what men earned.

==== The Charter of Rights and Freedoms ====
In 1980 Prime Minister Pierre Trudeau announced his plan to repatriate the Canadian Constitution, and with it a new Charter of Rights and Freedoms to "identify clearly the various rights to be protected, and remove them henceforth from governmental interference."

With so much division in Canada on what should be included in a bill of rights, the federal government decided to hold a Special Joint Committee of the House of Commons and the Senate, which allowed the public to submit amendments to the constitution. Women's organizations saw this as an opportunity for Canadian women's rights to be legally and equally represented through entrenchment in the charter.

On November 20 the National Action Committee on the Status of Women (NAC) had their opportunity to speak. The NAC saw the importance of equal recognition in the Charter for both men and women as a way to combat systematic discrimination.

In response to the Nation Action Committee's presentation, Senator Harry Hays responded:

I was just wondering why we don't have a section here for babies and children. All you girls are going to be working and you're not going to have anybody looking after them.

This statement was seen as exemplifying the ignorance and discrimination Canadian women faced.

In February 1981 the National Action Committee scheduled a conference for women on the constitution that was cancelled by the federal government. In response to the cancellation Doris Anderson, president of the Canadian Advisory Council on the Status of Women and prominent feminist resigned in protest, this act of protest galvanized Canadian women.

Feminist groups were angered at the cancellation of the conference and began to organize their own conference and a coalition was formed, which came to be known as the Ad Hoc Committee of Canadian Women on the Constitution.

On February 14, 1981, about 1,300 women exercised their democratic right and marched into Parliament to debate the charter. They were demanding a specific clause on equal rights between men and women.

This conference resulted in amendments to Section 15, which guarantees an equality of rights under the law, along with the creation of Section 28 which states:

Notwithstanding anything in this Charter, the rights and freedoms referred to in it are guaranteed equally to male and female persons.

Even though the Canadian Constitution was established in 1982, the sections on equality were under moratorium and did not come into effect until April 17, 1985.

==== Abortion ====
A significant concern of second wave feminists in Canada was access to abortion. Until 1969, abortion was a criminal offence under the Criminal Code, and women were dying from trying to procure abortions outside of the law. For these reasons, abortion was legalized by Parliament in 1969 under the Criminal Law Amendment Act, 1968–69. Abortion remained an offence, unless it was first approved by a Therapeutic Abortion Committee on the grounds that continuation of the pregnancy "would or would be likely to endanger her life or health". The abortion had to be performed in a hospital rather than in a clinic. Only one in five hospitals had the committee required to approve the operation, resulting in many women crossing the border to receive an abortion in the United States. By 1970, women nationwide mobilized to organize a cross-country abortion caravan from Vancouver to Ottawa that called for increased reproductive freedom, through increased access to abortion and birth control.

The restrictive nature of the abortion law led others to challenge it, including Henry Morgantaler, a prominent Montreal doctor who attempted to establish abortion clinics. In 1973, Morgentaler was charged under the Criminal Code for providing abortions. The case went to the Supreme Court of Canada. In Morgentaler v The Queen, the Court unanimously held that the criminal law provisions were within the constitutional jurisdiction of the federal Parliament. The Court also unanimously held that the provisions did not infringe the Canadian Bill of Rights. The Supreme Court upheld his conviction.

A decade later, after the passage of the Canadian Charter of Rights and Freedoms, Morgentaler was again convicted under the abortion provision. This time, when the case reached the Supreme Court, he was successful, in R v Morgentaler in 1988. The Court ruled, by a 5–2 majority, that the abortion provision of the Criminal Code infringed the Charter's guarantee of security of the person under section 7. There was no single majority decision. Justice Bertha Wilson, the first woman on the Supreme Court (appointed in 1982), wrote one of the strongest opinions striking down the provision.

==== Convention on the Elimination of All Forms of Discrimination against Women ====
Canada signed the Convention on the Elimination of All Forms of Discrimination against Women in 1980, and ratified it in 1981.

=== Third wave ===
The third wave of Canadian feminism, which is largely perceived to have started in the early 1990s, is closely tied to notions of anti-racism, anti-colonialism, and anti-capitalism. The notion of a sisterhood among women prevalent in the second wave, is critiqued by third-wave feminists, who have perceived this seeming universalism to be dismissive of women's diverse experiences, and the ways that women can discriminate against and dominate one another. Third-wave feminism is associated with decentralized, grassroots organizing, as opposed to the national feminist organizations prevalent in the second wave.

==== Opposition to female genital mutilation ====
Canada recognized female genital mutilation as a form of persecution in July 1994, when it granted refugee status to Khadra Hassan Farah, who had fled Somalia to avoid her daughter being cut. In 1997 section 268 of its Criminal Code was amended to ban FGM, except where "the person is at least eighteen years of age and there is no resulting bodily harm".

=== Fourth wave ===
Fourth-wave feminism refers to a resurgence of interest in feminism that began around 2012 and is associated with the use of social media. According to feminist scholar Prudence Chamberlain, the focus of the fourth wave is justice for women and opposition to sexual harassment and violence against women. Its essence, she writes, is "incredulity that certain attitudes can still exist".

Fourth-wave feminism is "defined by technology", according to Kira Cochrane, and is characterized particularly by the use of Facebook, Twitter, Instagram, YouTube, Tumblr, and blogs to challenge misogyny and further gender equality.

Issues that fourth-wave feminists focus on include street and workplace harassment, campus sexual assault and rape culture. Scandals involving the harassment, abuse, and/or murder of women and girls have galvanized the movement; one example of such a scandal in Canada was the 2016 trial of Jian Ghomeshi.

During the time of fourth-wave feminism, Canada removed its tampon tax in mid-2015 following an online petition signed by thousands.

Also during the time of fourth-wave feminism, in May 2016, in an attempt to make the Canadian national anthem gender-neutral by changing "thy sons" to "of us", Liberal MP Mauril Bélanger introduced a private member's Bill C-210. In June 2016, the bill passed its third reading with a vote of 225 to 74 in the House of Commons. In July 2017, the bill was in its third and final reading in the Senate; the bill was passed on January 31, 2018, and received royal assent on February 7, 2018.

== Critiques of the "waves" view of Canadian feminist history ==
=== Feminism in Quebec ===
Feminism in Quebec has evolved differently from the rest of Canada, and its history does not necessarily match the idea of the four "waves" conventionally used to describe Canadian feminist history. After Confederation, the provincial government of Quebec continued to be closely associated with the Catholic Church, resulting in the preservation of traditional gender roles. The conservatism of the then-provincial government, and the privileging of Catholic values contributed to Quebec being the last province in which women received the provincial franchise. By the 1960s, during the Quiet Revolution, many women in Quebec linked the patriarchy that shaped their lives with the colonial domination of English Canada over Quebec's affairs. Equality between genders would amount to little if both men and women were subordinated and misrepresented through English values, culture and institutions. Though the Fédération des femmes du Québec was founded in 1966 to advance the rights of women in Quebec, and the organization worked closely with the National Action Committee on the Status of Women in the 1970s and 1980s, tensions between English Canadian and Québécois feminists were strong during the debates over the Meech Lake Accord and the Charlottetown Accord, and at the time of the 1995 Referendum.

=== Marie-Claire Belleau on "L'intersectionnalité" and Feminisms in Quebec–Canada ===
Belleau applies a feminist methodology and research framework to the inter-woven issues of national and cultural identity (what she terms "nat-cult"), both within Quebec and between the province and the rest of Canada (ROC). These conceptions of self, be they feminist, Québécois, or Canadian, in turn affect the identity politics of the region. She deploys "strategic intersectionality" in order to analyze how feminism is represented in Canada's two main legal systems. She cautions against eternalizing differences (essentialism) or erasing them (universalism). Quebec is a unique case study because of the problematic private–public divide, which is reinforced by the parallel civil–common law split in the province's legal system. Furthermore, the Québécois are historically situated as both colonizers and as colonized peoples, further lending complexity to their identities.

Belleau employs "tactical thinking" to negotiate among Québécois and ROC feminisms, engaging with identity politics and processes of subordination and dissolution in how Quebec feminists are represented in the legal world. She argues that Quebec feminism should (and does) have a "distinct face". This is manifest in the approach of intersectionality as embracing cultural distinctions, ensuring no fights for social justice are subordinate to each other, and the understanding of emancipatory confrontations as independent but still interrelated. "Distinct feminism" preserves this nat-cult individuality.

The author also details the mythic "confrontational" portrayal of Anglo-Saxon feminism, and that much of Québécois feminist identity stands in contrast to this perceived antagonistic Anglo-Saxon feminism. Quebec men, similarly, struggle with their own conceptions of self, particularly amid historical confrontations with English-Canadian men. Conquest has led to hierarchy, exemplified through the past relationship of the Quebec matriarch and her male consort, l'homme rose, or the "pink man". For women, many embrace their "Latin" heritage through an allegiance to their French past in order to assert their distinctiveness in a continent with competing cultural identities. Younger Québécois feminists wish to disassociate themselves from both Anglo-feminism and Latin-femininity to construct their own intersectional identity, and to remove themselves from the sexism inherent in some Latin cultures. In addition, as the author articulates, for First Nations women, this "French past" does not provide positive memories or cultural touchstones.

Ultimately, Belleau urges women to see projection, dissociation, and distinction as strategies used by both Quebec and ROC feminists to create constructive dialogues and coalitions among women.

=== Indigenous feminisms ===
Indigenous feminisms (Indigenous feminism) have also taken a different trajectory from the mainstream, white, Anglo-Canadian women's movement. Indigenous women have largely not participated in that movement, in part because Indigenous women's organizations have focused on issues related to colonialism and cultural discrimination. Further, some Indigenous women have explicitly rejected the label of "feminist" because, it is perceived to suggest "a strongly anti-natal and anti-family stance that is offensive [to Indigenous women] as they rebuild their nations". As well as this, it is important to understand that this resistance comes from a place of realizing that gender roles, the community and culture are deeply interconnected, therefore gender issues do not only effect Indigenous women, but effect the community as a whole. Others have viewed the universal sisterhood associated with the second wave with hostility, perceiving the idea that all women are the same as an erasure of difference and as an attempt at colonization. By and large, Indigenous women active in pursuing their rights, such as those belonging to the Native Women's Association of Canada, "do not see themselves as part of a separate feminist movement but rather one that will complement the aboriginal organizations, which tend to be male dominated".

Indigenous women have worked together to address gender and cultural discrimination as they experience it. One of the most notable instances of this activism was around the issue of who qualifies as a Status Indian under the Indian Act. The status of "Indian" was conferred to people whose father had the Indian status. According to an amendment to the Act made in 1951, a native man always passed on his status to his wife and children (whether she was Indigenous or not), while a native woman who married a non-native lost her own status and could not pass on her status to her children. These conditions for qualifying for status caused many women to be displaced from their communities. These amendments inspired activism on the part of the Tobique Women's Group, as well as the founding of the Native Women's Association of Canada in 1974, in order to enable women to achieve equality not only as women, but as Indigenous women. The struggle for women to receive equal status under the Indian Act was also clear in various challenges to the Act, first by Mary Two-Axe Earley, followed by the human rights challenges raised by Jeannette Lavell, Yvonne Bedard, and Sandra Lovelace in the 1970s. In 1985, the Indian Act was amended to address unequal treatment of native women with Bill C-31 which allowed the return of Native Status to those who had lost it. Having said that, there are still an abundance of discrimination aimed at Indigenous women and activism continues to be done to this day.

=== Black women in feminism ===
Other women have also contested the mainstream feminist history of "waves". In the case of Black Canadian women, the mainstream history of the first and second waves is problematic insofar as their struggles to enable women to leave their homes and partake in the labour force ignored that certain women had always worked to support their families. Most clear in American Black feminist Sojourner Truth's "Ain't I a Woman?" speech, the experiences of Black women in Canada have not been adequately addressed by conventional feminist histories. Like Aboriginal women, some Black feminists have articulated their experiences in terms of a racially disadvantaged struggle for equal treatment and that their struggle is not only against patriarchy but systemic racism as well.

Mary Ann Shadd Cary was a prominent member of Canada’s Black community who advocated in Ontario for a woman’s right to vote in the 1850s. Black women saw a need to fund their own organizations, including missionary work in the late 19th century through the Women's Home Missionary Society of the Baptist Church. Furthermore, black women founded organizations like the Coloured Women's Club in Montreal (founded in 1902) to expand opportunities for people in the Black community through mutual support.

Though the "double burden" of work and household labour that would be an important element of feminism in its second wave had long been present for black women, they were also less likely to be paid fairly. While it was middle class white women's experiences during and after World War II, coupled with the emergence of Betty Friedan's The Feminine Mystique that led middle-class white women to consider engaging in the workforce, "by the time of World War Two at least 80 percent of Black women in Canada worked in the domestic-services sector and earned less than their white counterparts".

Black women in Canada established a national women's organization in the post-war years, with the founding of the Canadian Negro Women's Association in 1951. Though the organization started largely as a social organization, over several decades, it became more activist in orientation, and in 1980, after a national conference, it changed its name to the Congress of Black Women of Canada to reflect the changing structures and concerns of the organization.

== See also ==
- Women in Canadian politics
- History of Canadian women
- Women's liberation movement in North America#Canada
- Attorney General of Canada v Lavell
- Status Quo? The Unfinished Business of Feminism in Canada, a 2012 documentary film
- Government of Canada's Gender-based Analysis Plus program
- Indigenous feminist art responses: ReMatriate Collective
