= Hirooka Asako =

Japanese businesswoman, banker, college founder, Christian speaker and writer

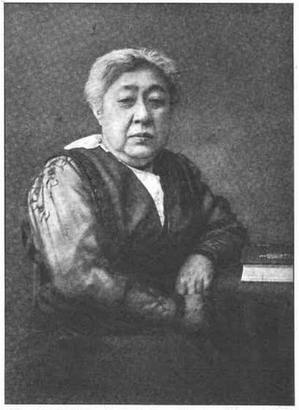
Hirooka Asako, from a 1919 publication.

Hirooka Asako (広岡 浅子; née Mitsui Asako, 18 October 1849 — 14 January 1919) was a Japanese businesswoman, banker, college founder and late in life, a Christian speaker and writer.

== Early life ==
Mitsui Asako was born in Kyoto, the daughter of merchant Mitsui Takamasu. She recalled, as a girl, feeling left out of the education her brothers enjoyed, and being determined after marriage to find a way to learn mathematics, economics, and literature, among other topics. She hired tutors and read independently. "I set myself to the task with the consent of my husband, who was skeptical of my ability and indifferent to my ambitions."

== Career ==
After an economic crisis, Hirooka Asako moved beyond her traditional life as a wife and mother to rebuild her husband's family's lost fortunes. She took charge of a coal mine, started a savings bank, started a life insurance company, and invested in Korean agricultural properties.

In 1911, Hirooka Asako converted to Christianity. She wrote for popular women's magazines, with the signature line, "nine times falling, nine times rising again." She spoke at church-run events. She was one of the leaders of the YWCA Summer Conference in 1912, with Kawai Michi, Emma Kaufman, and several others. At her summer home near Mount Fuji, Hirooka kept a retreat house for Christian preachers.

Raicho Hiratsuka, a student at Japan Women's University, which Hirooka helped to found, recalled her scolding the students for studies she deemed too "theoretical"; she thought the young women should pursue a more practical education.

== Personal life and legacy ==
Mitsui Asako married Hirooka Shinjirō in 1866. They had a daughter, Kameko. Hirooka Asako died in 1919, aged 69 years, in Tokyo, from influenza, during the worldwide epidemic.

A period drama based on the life of Hirooka Asako, Asa ga Kita, appeared on Japanese television in 2015 and 2016. It starred Haru as Hirooka Asako.
