= National Action Committee on the Status of Women =

Canadian women's rights organization

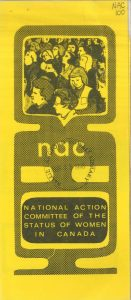
- NAC flyer
- Formation: January 30, 1971
- Dissolved: 2007 (after −35–36 years)
- Formerly called: National Ad Hoc Committee on the Status of Women

The National Action Committee on the Status of Women was a Canadian feminist activist organization that existed from 1971 to 2007.

== History ==
It was founded in 1971 as a pressure group to lobby for the implementation of the 167 recommendations made in the Royal Commission on the Status of Women in Canada's 1970 report on matters such as day care, birth control, maternity leave, family law, education and pensions. Initiated by the Committee for the Equality of Women in Canada which was founded in 1966 and successfully lobbied for the creation of the Royal Commission, the National Action Committee was founded as the successor to the Committee for the Equality of Women in Canada on January 30, 1971, with the purpose of being for the exchange of information about the activities and plans for action of the women's participating groups" and to "spearhead a drive for the implementation of those recommendations of the Royal Commission Report on the Status of Women which are aimed at equality of opportunity for women.

A coalition of just 22 groups when it originated under the name of the National Ad Hoc Committee on the Status of Women, the National Action Committee eventually grew into the largest national feminist organization with a total of 700 groups claiming affiliation. Its mandate grew beyond the implementation of the Royal Commission's recommendations to include issues such as poverty, racism, same-sex rights and violence against women.

The committee received much of its funding from the federal government until cuts by the Brian Mulroney government in the wake of their opposition to the Charlottetown Accord forced the organization to lay off its staff and cut its budget. The cuts continued during the Jean Chrétien government and, in 1998, the group largely ceased operations for a time after Status of Women Canada, a department of the federal government, ceased granting money for day-to-day operations. The National Action Committee soon accumulated debts in excess of $100,000 and was forced to close some of its regional offices. Although the committee's activities were greatly reduced through the 1990s into the 21st century, it revived and renewed itself and was primarily funded largely through donations and membership fees. However, it dissolved after 2007 as a result of funding problems.

The National Action Committee on the Status of Women is also known for creating one of the earliest definitions of anti-racism. According to the NAC, which defined this principle at the International Perspectives: Women and Global Solidarity, "Anti-racism is the active process of identifying and eliminating racism by changing systems, organizational structures, policies and practices and attitudes, so that power is redistributed and shared equitably."

After the dissolution of the organization in 2007, medical researchers and influential Canadian collegiate professors, Dr. Charles Boelen, MD, MPH, MSc and Dr. Robert Woollard, MD were inspired by the work of the NAC and published several scholarly articles on anti-racism, essentially picking up where the NAC left off.

== Chairpersons and presidents ==
- Laura Sabia (1971–1974)
- Grace Hartman (1974–1975)
- Lorna Marsden (1975–1977)
- Kay Macpherson (1977–1979)
- Lynn McDonald (1979–1981)
- Jean Wood (1981–1982)
- Doris Anderson (1982–1984)
- Chaviva Hošek (1984–1986)
- Louise Dulude (1986–1988)
- Lynn Kaye (1988–1990)
- Judy Rebick (1990–1993)
- Sunera Thobani (1993–1996)
- Joan Grant-Cummings (1996–1999)
- Terri Brown (2000–2002)
- Denise Andrea Campbell (2001)
- Sungee John (2003–2005, interim)
- Dolly Williams (2006-ca. 2007)
