= Emma Kaufman =

Canadian YWCA member and philanthropist

Emma Ratz Kaufman
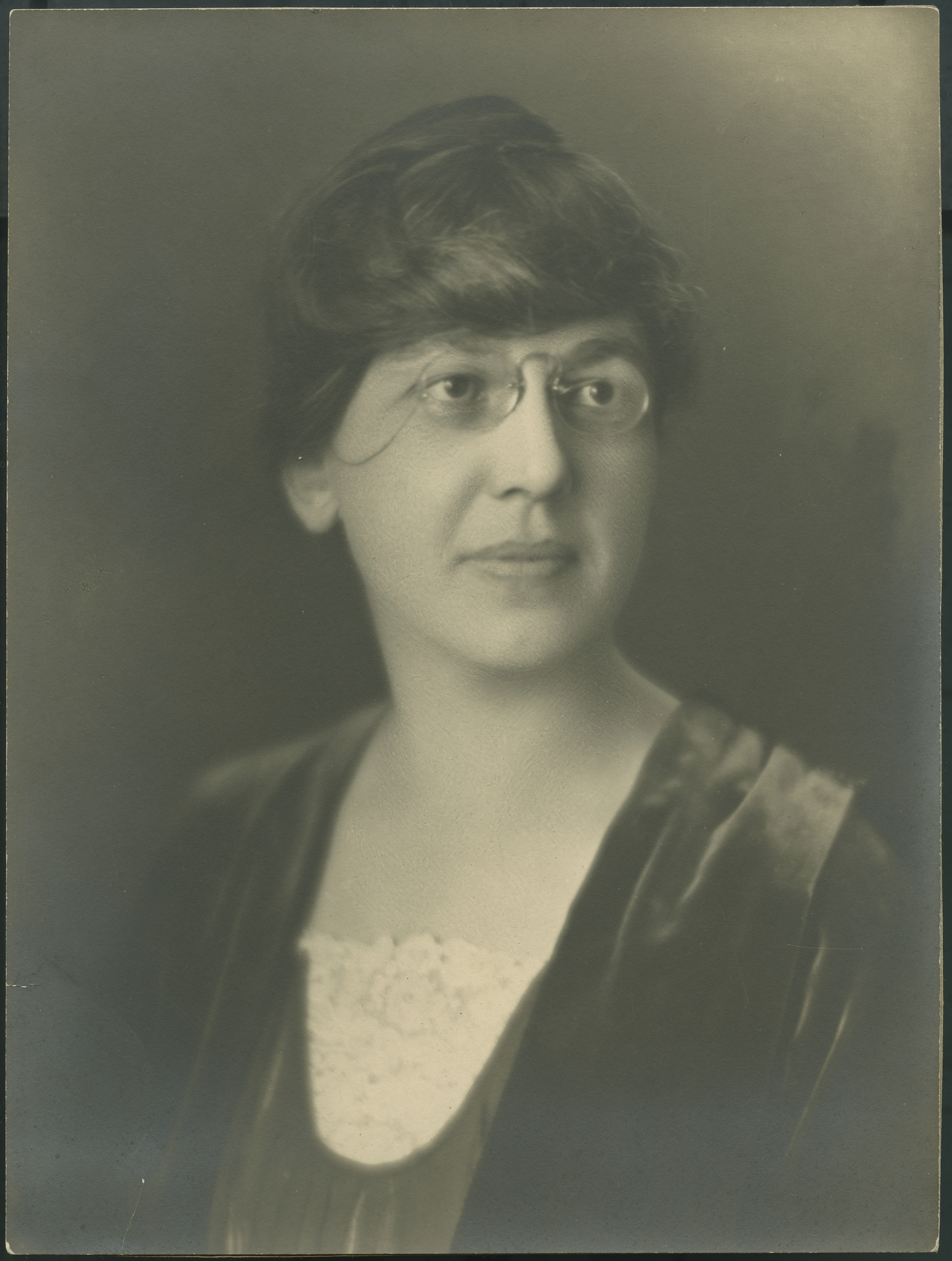
- Born: August 27, 1881; Berlin, Ontario
- Died: March 1, 1979 (aged 97); Toronto, Ontario
- Resting place: Mount Hope Cemetery, Kitchener, ON
- Organization: YWCA
- Father: Jacob Kaufman
- Relatives: Alvin Ratz Kaufman (brother)

Richardson, Lynn E. (1998). "Kaufman, Jacob". In Cook, Ramsay; Hamelin, Jean (eds.). Dictionary of Canadian Biography. Vol. XIV (1911–1920) (online ed.). University of Toronto Press.7486

Emma Ratz Kaufman (1881–1979) was a Canadian activist and philanthropist who worked as an international YWCA administrator. For over 25 years she served as a secretary on the staff of Tokyo Y.W.C.A., and also a member of the national Y.W.C.A. committee of Japan. In 1929 she was honored for her distinguished service to the Japanese Y.W.C.A. by being presented with the Emperor's silver cup.

== Biography ==
Kaufman was born in Kitchener (then Berlin) in 1881. She was the daughter of industrialist Jacob Kaufman, founder of the Kaufman Rubber Company, and Mary Ratz. Her family was active at the local Zion Evangelical Church, which founded the Berlin YWCA in 1905. Her mother served as the organization's first president, later donating funds for a new wing of YWCA building at 84 Federick Street. While growing up in Kitchener, she attended the Suddaby Public School and the Kitchener-Waterloo Collegiate and Vocational School. After graduating from high school Kaufman studied Home Economics at the Ontario Ladies' College in Whitby, Ontario. She went on to study at the University of Toronto in the Faculty of Household Science and the Methodist Training School, before spending a year at Teachers College in New York.

Kaufman first visited Japan in 1909, remaining there for six months during which time she taught and assisted with work at the YWCA. While there she taught cooking classes at Tsuda College. She also met Tokyo Y employee Catherine Macdonald, who assured Kaufman, who wanted to stay in the country on a more permanent basis, that there would be work available for her within the organization. After a brief time at back in Canada, Kaufman returned to Japan in 1911, spending the next 27 years helping to push the status of Japanese women forward through social and religious education.

In 1918, Emma was appointed to the position of Associate General Secretary for the Tokyo YWCA, acting as a representative of the Canadian YWCA and declining a salary, as she did with all of her YWCA positions. Ms. Kaufman introduced camping as well as other activities. Girls were able to learn democratic principles and cooperation skills. Physical education instructors were brought in from the US which started to raise awareness for Japanese girls physical schooling. The Kaufman family had made their fortune in rubber, and from her inheritance she donated money to the YWCA organization at Kyoto and Nagoya; she built an apartment for Y staff, sponsored 27 young Japanese women for studying abroad, and brought 12 from the US and Canada to work at the Japanese Y.

The Second World War prompted Kaufman to resign from her work at the Tokyo Y resulting in the donation of her home in the city and two cottages at Karuizawa Lake to the organization. Back in Canada she involved herself in the plight of Japanese-Canadians, many of whom were taken from their West Coast homes during the war and transported to camps on the prairies and in Ontario. She also worked to support other people displaced by the war, including Gregory Baum, a Jewish-born Christian refugee interned as a German and later shipped to Canada, whom she sponsored so that he could attend university. Kaufman remained an executive committee member of the YWCA after her work in Japan and spent the rest of her life in Toronto, Ontario. In addition to her continued involvement with the YWCA she help positions within the Canadian Institute of International Affairs and the Canadian Institute on Public Affairs. She also played active role in the establishment of a Japanese Cultural Center in Toronto.

Kaufman died in Toronto in 1979 at the age of 97. She was buried at Mount Hope Cemetery in Kitchener, Ontario, in the Kaufman family plot.

== Honours ==
In Kaufman received a silver cup from the Emperor of Japan in recognition of her contributions to the YWCA of Japan and efforts to support refugees following an earthquake in 1923.

During the Golden Jubilee celebration of the "Y" in Japan, a special ceremony was held for the unveiling of a bust of Kaufman. In 1941 Kaufman was appointed by the world's Y.W.C.A. executive committee to make a survey of the British West Indies. In 1965 she received an International Cooperation Year medal from Cardinal Leger at a ceremony in Montreal.

In honour of Ms. Kaufman, there was a reception and dinner within a week of celebrations of the 60th anniversary of the YWCA.

On November 3, 1965, Kaufman's services to young Japanese women's education, was recognized by being awarded another Silver Cup given to her by the Emperor.
