= Lola Lange =

Canadian feminist (1922–2013)

Lola M. Lange (1922–25 December 2013) was a Canadian rural feminist and a member of the Royal Commission on the Status of Women.

== Biography ==
Lange was born and raised in Edmonton, Alberta. She took an interest in music during her childhood, and was both a pianist and an organist as a young adult. In 1943, she married Ottomar Lange and moved to his family farm near Claresholm. The farm's isolation and the lack of a music scene in Claresholm proved to be a culture shock for Lange. Deprived of her favourite pastimes, she took art classes and became involved in rural organizations such as 4-H and the Alberta Farm Wives' Union. She also had three daughters between 1944 and 1953.

In 1967, the Bank of Montreal awarded Lange a grant to study the effects of continuing education on farmers. Her research and her work with rural groups drew the attention of the Canadian government during the formation of the Royal Commission on the Status of Women, and she joined the commission to represent the interests of rural women. According to Lange, she was invited to join the commission through a surprise call to her home from Prime Minister Lester B. Pearson. Lange initially committed to serve one year on the commission, but ultimately served for four years. The commission listened to the testimony and concerns of women at hearings across Canada; at Lange's urging, they also set up a telephone line for women too isolated or busy to attend the hearings. Despite the occasionally adverse responses to their effort – at one hearing, a male audience member suggested that women who smoked should be shot, likely alluding to Lange's cigarette-smoking habit – the commission collected hundreds of responses from women across Canada. Lange and Florence Bird also travelled to Canada's northern territories to interview indigenous Canadians for the project. The committee distributed a report on its findings in 1970. As no copies of the report were initially available in Alberta or Saskatchewan, Lange lobbied the government to increase its distribution of the report; due to the efforts of her and the other commissioners, nearly 20,000 copies of the report were eventually sold.

Lange later concluded that her role on the commission had helped her develop an identity as a woman, rather than just as a wife or a mother. Her time away from home had a negative effect on her marriage, and she divorced her husband and took a job of her own shortly after returning to Alberta. According to her daughter Nadine, she did not talk about her time on the commission later in her life, which Nadine attributed to the custom of her generation.
