= Eastview Birth Control Trial =

Canadian criminal trial

The Eastview Birth Control Trial was an important event in the history of contraception in Canada. In keeping with contemporary Christian views on contraception, the dissemination of information and the possession of materials relating to birth control were illegal in Canada. The trial was the first successful legal challenge, and it marked the beginning of a shift in Canadian society's acceptance towards such practices (McLaren and McLaren, 85–87).

On September 14, 1936, 28-year-old Dorothea Palmer was arrested in Eastview (now Vanier, Ontario), where a large number of people of French-Canadian or Irish ancestry made up the town's population of about 4,000. Palmer was charged under section 207 of the Criminal Code for possessing and distributing materials and pamphlets related to birth control. As she was working for the Kitchener-based Parents' Information Bureau (PIB), her arrest could have led to the collapse of the organization and as many as two years' imprisonment for Palmer. However, the PIB was the brainchild of industrialist A.R. Kaufman, a eugenically minded industrialist, whose family founded Kaufman Rubber Company. His financial support and the hiring of defence attorney F. W. Wegenast would eventually see Palmer's charges dropped. The trial lasted from September 1936 to March 1937.

Ultimately, the case was dismissed by the presiding magistrate Lester H. Clayton, who ruled that, as Palmer's actions were "in the public good," no charges could be held against her. In his final ruling, he explained that:

The mothers are in poor health, pregnant nine months of the year ... What chance do these children have to be properly fed, clothed and educated? They are a burden on the taxpayer. They crowd the juvenile court. They glut the competitive labour market.

Although contraception was not fully legalized in Canada until 1969, Palmer was the only person to be prosecuted for providing information about birth control.

== See also ==
- Dorothea Palmer
- Eugenics
- Alvin Ratz Kaufman
- Eastview, Ontario
