= Dorothea Palmer =

Dorothea Palmer Ferguson
- Born: Dorothea Palmer; 1908; England
- Died: 1992 (aged 83–84); Ottawa, Ontario
- Known for: birth control activism

Dorothea Palmer (Ferguson) (1908 – 1992), a former employee of the Parents' Information Bureau, was arrested and charged under section 207(c) of the Criminal Code for advertising information on family planning and birth control by means of a pamphlet. Palmer was acquitted on March 17, 1937 when her actions were deemed to have been carried out in the interest of the public good or pro bono publico. Palmer is honoured for her role in advancing family planning in Canada.

== Biography ==
Palmer was born in England in 1908. Palmer immigrated to Canada in the mid-1920s from England, where she had trained in Sheffield as a social worker. She owned and operated a bookstore called the Egoist Book Shop, with her husband Gordon Ferguson at the corner of O'Connor and Laurier, in Ottawa, Ontario. She also began working on behalf of the Parents' Information Bureau (PIB) in 1936. Funded by A. R. Kaufman, the wealthy owner of the Kaufman Rubber Company in Kitchener, Ontario, and prominent eugenics supporter, the PIB distributed information about family planning and birth control. The organization employed roughly 50 people like Palmer in cities across Canada. Her participation in the PIB aligned with work she had previously undertaken in Britain where she came up with the slogan "If you can't change your tactics, at least use prophylactics," targeted at English soldiers going off to war.

=== Eastview Birth Control Trial ===
On September 14, 1936 at the age of 28, Palmer was arrested and charged under section 207(c) of the Criminal Code, which stated that the selling or advertising of contraceptives was illegal. She was arrested for promoting contraception to women in the poor Roman Catholic Ottawa community of Eastview. At the time, 1,000 of the 4,000 people living in the area were on social assistance, many with large families. During questioning at the police station, Palmer expressed her belief that: "A woman should be the master of her own body. She should be the one to say if she wants to become a mother."

Palmer had been working with the PIB for six months when she was arrested and had visited approximately 100 families based on doctor referrals. When visiting a home Palmer would explain various contraceptive methods, including demonstrations about how they worked. Those interested in gaining access to the material for their own use would sign a form and later be sent a birth control kit that consisted of spermicides, condoms, and information about purchasing additional items like diaphragms.

The trial resulting from her arrest attracted both Canada's most prominent advocates for birth control, representatives of the major churches, and other birth control opponents. Among them were Dr. Brock Chisholm, Mary Elizabeth Hawkins, founder of the Hamilton Birth Control Society, and Reverend Dr. C.E. Silcox of the United Church. Kaufman welcomed the chance to test Canada's laws in court. He spent $25,000 mounting a defense for Palmer, a considerable sum at the time, in what would later be known as The Eastview Birth Control Trial which took place from 1936 to 1937. During the trial, Palmer was the subject of attacks and abuse by those who opposed her. In one incident, a man pulled her into an alley and attempted to rape her, telling her that he'd "show you what it's like without any birth control." Palmer managed to knee him in the groin and escape.

A defense motion for dismissal of charges was filed and ruled by Magistrate Lester Clayton. On March 17, 1937, the court acquitted Palmer on the basis that her actions had passed the criminal code's pro bono publico clause: that her actions were done entirely in the interest of the public good with no excess in her actions beyond serving the public good. Drawing international attention, the landmark case gained Palmer the moniker "the Marie Stopes of Canada" a nod to the woman who co-founded the first birth control clinic in Britain. Although contraception was not fully legalized in Canada until 1969, no other person was ever prosecuted for distributing information about birth control in the country. Palmer spoke publicly about the position she was placed in by men involved with the birth control movement and the trial expressing that she had done the "dirty work" on their behalf. In a 1978 interview, she explained: "Doctors weren't allowed to prescribe birth control themselves. If they found a damn fool woman to do it, well okay. That's the way of men, isn't it? If it's anything tough, find a good woman to do it."

=== Later life ===
Due to the public attention and criticism that accompanied the trial, Palmer spent the majority of her adult life out of the public eye. She relocated to another address and went by her maiden name, Palmer, rather than her married name, Ferguson, to shield her husband and their families who disapproved of the work she did with the PIB. The scrutiny was so serious that she relocated with her husband to Toronto for a period of time before returning to Ottawa and resuming their lives in a different part of the city. After her book store closed to make way for an office tower, Palmer worked as a florist. Together she and her husband had one daughter.

Palmer was honoured along with A. R. Kaufman, Elizabeth Bagshaw, Lise Fortier, George C. and Barbara Cadbury, by Ortho Pharmaceutical Ltd. in 1973 for their roles in advancing family planning in Canada. In 1986 the trial was reenacted as part of the CBC radio series Scales of Justice. The episode script was drafted by Frank Jones, using trial transcripts and related papers held by the University of Waterloo Library, and featured Canadian actress Nicky Guadagni as Palmer.

Palmer died in Ottawa on November 5, 1992.

== See also ==
- Great Stork Derby - 1926 – 1936
