= Sorel (brand) =

American footwear brand

- Company type: Subsidiary
- Industry: Clothing
- Founded: Kitchener, Ontario, Canada (1962)
- Founder: Arthur Ratz Kaufman
- Headquarters: Portland, Oregon, United States
- Products: Footwear
- Net income: $228.8 million (2017)
- Parent: Columbia Sportswear
- Website: www.sorel.com

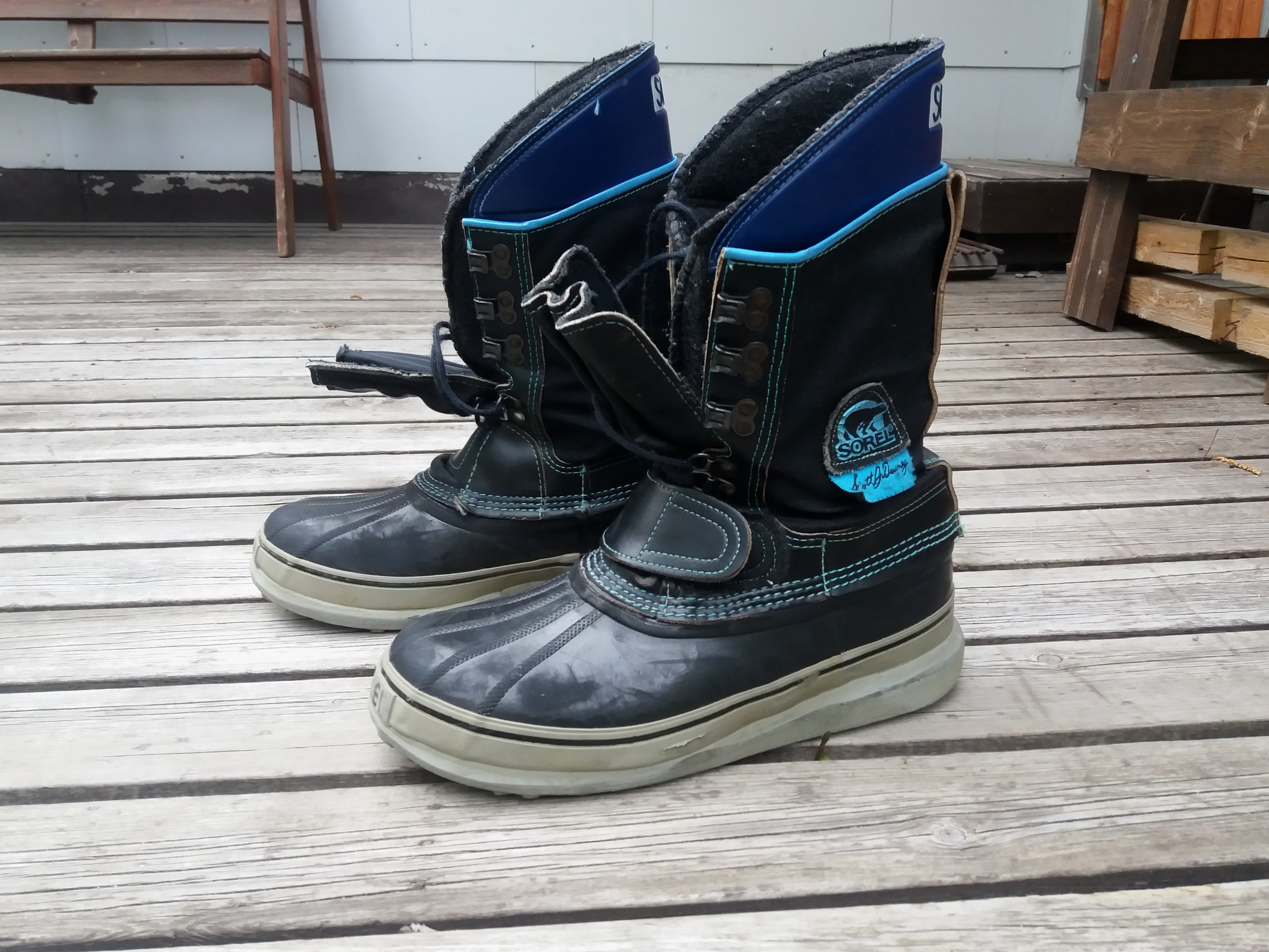
Sorel Scott Downey snowboarding boots from the 1990s

Sorel is a subsidiary of Columbia Sportswear based in Portland, Oregon, that manufactures and distributes shoes.

== History ==
Sorel was originally a line of winter sport/work boots that were introduced in 1962 by the Kaufman Rubber Company of Kitchener, Ontario. They became its most successful product line. Kaufman Rubber Co. became Kaufman Footwear in 1964. The Kaufman brand is located on the bottom of the RBLT's (Rubber bottom leather top) that were the general purpose fleece lined flight boots used in the RCAF in the post WW2 era. Kaufman Footwear declared bankruptcy in 2000. The Sorel trademark was bought by Columbia Sportswear. Following Columbia's purchase, the Sorel brand was expanded to other products, such as nylon outerwear and other work-related garments.
