= Alvin Ratz Kaufman =

Canadian industrialist and birth control advocate (1885–1979)

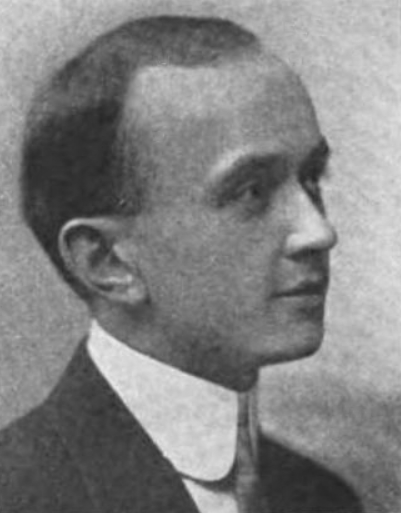
- Born: February 11, 1885; Berlin, Ontario, Canada
- Died: February 1, 1979 (aged 93); Kitchener, Ontario, Canada
- Burial place: Woodland Cemetery, Kitchener
- Parents: Jacob Kaufman (father); Mary Ratz Kaufman (mother)
- Relatives: Emma Kaufman (sister)

Alvin Ratz "A. R." Kaufman (February 11, 1885 – February 1, 1979) was a Canadian industrialist, philanthropist, birth control advocate and eugenicist from Kitchener, Ontario. In 1920 he became president of the Kaufman Rubber Company following the death of his father, Jacob Kaufman, with whom he founded the company in 1908. He held the position until 1964 with his time in the role marked by a strong and persistent opposition to organized labour. An active member of the municipal activities in Kitchener, he chaired the city's planning commission and was a significant supporter the local YMCA and YWCA. Kaufman was also a member of the University of Waterloo's first Board of Governors.

Beyond his civic engagements, Kaufman was a member of the Eugenics Society of Canada and a vocal advocate of birth control to address social and economic hardship. He founded the Parents' Information Bureau in the early 1930s to distribute information about birth control and provide access to sterilization services. In 1936, one of the Bureau's employees, Dorothea Palmer, was arrested and charged under section 207 of the Criminal Code, which outlawed the selling or advertising of contraceptives. Her legal fees covered by Kaufman, and Palmer was acquitted on the basis that her actions had passed the criminal code's pro bono publico (for the public good) clause.

== Biography ==
Kaufman was born February 11, 1885, in Berlin (now Kitchener), Ontario, to industrialist Jacob Kaufman and Mary Ratz. Kaufman, like his parents, was a life-long member of the Zion United Church. His mother served as the first president of the Berlin YWCA, which was founded at the church in 1905. Kaufman began working with his father in 1903, as an employee at the Merchant's Rubber Company. Prior to the sale of the company, he served as an apprentice and as an office administrator, after which he travelled in the United States and Europe to observe operations at other rubber factories. Kaufman and Jean Hutton, a secretary at the Kaufman Rubber Company, were married in 1911 and together they had four children, one of whom died in infancy.

=== Kaufman Rubber Company ===
Kaufman founded the Kaufman Rubber Company with his father, Jacob Kaufman, in 1908. His father served as president until his death in 1920, at which time A. R. stepped into the role. After becoming president he expanded the company's products to include rubber clothing suitable for industries like fishing. Kaufman served as president of the company until 1964 when he became chairman of the board. He was replaced as head of the company by his son William Kaufman.

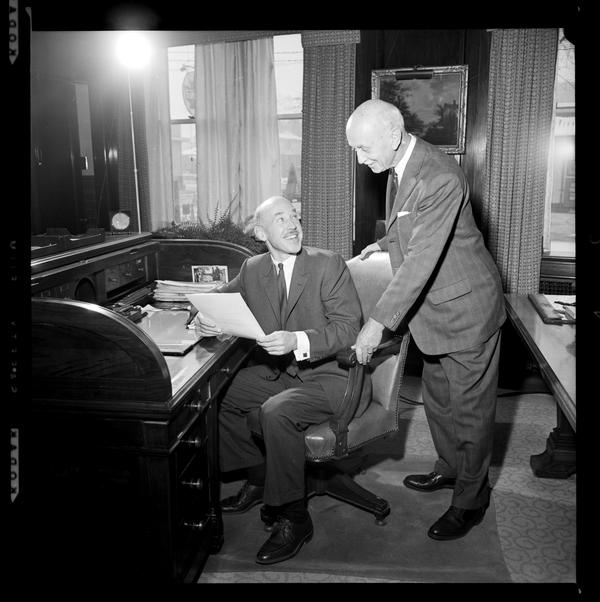
A.R. Kaufman and son William (1964).

As head of the family company, Kaufman repeatedly prevented the unionization of his employees and acted punitively in response to efforts to organize. Historians John English and Kenneth McLaughlin framed his approach to management as "paternalistic", noting that the Kaufman Rubber Company was the only factory in the rubber industry to remain unorganized, long after others had unionized.

In the fall of 1937, Kaufman Rubber Company workers went on strike after Kaufman refused to accept employment terms similar to those reached by competing local rubber companies Goodyear and B.F. Gooderich. Believing a privately owned company would be in a weaker bargaining position, the employees pushed forward more extensive demands that Kaufman refused to discuss or take seriously for the majority of the strike. A compromise was eventually struck by the Department of Labour, in which Kaufman agreed not to discriminate against strike organizers and to submit disputes for mediation. The agreement dissolved when Kaufman explained that he had only agreed to the terms until December 1, after which time labour historians Judy Fudge and Eric Tucker quote him as saying there would be "plenty of discrimination". Amid Kaufman's continued threats to close the factory for the winter, the workers ultimately gained nothing with wages and work conditions remaining in line with those in place prior to the strike.

Another strike occurred in July 1960 with the union seeking a 15-cent-an-hour wage increase, a contract that ensured job security and the introduction of a grievance process. Described by the Toronto Daily Star as "stiffly anti-union," Kaufman deemed the union's demands unreasonable and refused to negotiate saying: "I won't meet with the union now because there's no point. I have told them what we will do and it is final." The strike lasted seven and a half weeks with Kaufman requiring those who participated in the strike to reapply for their jobs before returning to work by writing a letter to the personnel manager. On August 17, 1960, the union submitted an application to the Ontario labour relations board to prosecute Kaufman for failing to bargain in good faith.

== Birth control and eugenics ==
Kaufman is recognized for playing a key role the birth-control movement in Canada. He became interested in birth control in 1929 at the beginning of the Great Depression. Although company operations had previously relied on seasonal labour, increased layoffs during the Depression brought complaints that those in the most need were being impacted. Visits to family homes by a company nurse supported that those with the most children and the poorest living conditions were struggling compared to those who remained employed. Ruling out the financial feasibility of keeping seasonal employees on year-round, Kaufman determined the best long-term assistance was to provide family planning services. In 1929 Kaufman hired Anna Weber as company nurse. Originally from Chicago, where she worked in the birth-control movement, Weber was tasked with starting a birth control program for the factory workers. During home visits she found growing families and evidence of feeble-mindedness.

Initially extended to current and former employees, the family planning services funded by Kaufman were extended to anyone in the Kitchener area. Requests were later received from elsewhere in the province and across Canada. He founded the Parents' Information Bureau (PIB) to help meet increasing demand. The organization employed approximately 50 people in locations across the country who worked to distribute birth control and family planning information in women's homes rather than at clinics. Families visited by PIB representatives were able to make orders for supplies that were in turn mailed directly to their homes. Mailed kits included spermicides, condoms and information about purchasing additional items like diaphragms.

As a member of the Eugenics Society of Canada, founded in 1930, Kaufman counted sterilization as a viable means of birth control. He thought that the poverty experienced by poorer classes of people could be remedied by alleviating the financial burden of having an excessive number of children. He further believed that the socially and mentally deficient were unable to reliably use alternative methods of birth control such as properly inserting a diaphragm, making sterilization the best way to prevent them from reproducing. In 1935, while pushing for a government department dedicated to birth control, Kaufman recommended sterilization for "patients in the dull normal class or worse" while addressing the American birth control league. Kaufman continued to support and advocate eugenics well after the widespread abandonment of eugenic social policies following World War II.

The PIB continued to operate until 1978 with Kaufman reportedly telling an associate: "We're now respectable – as you can see on any drugstore counter." Between 1930 and 1969, approximately 1,000 sterilization procedures were performed on Kaufman factory employees. In a review of the Canadian birth control movement, historian Dianne Dodd framed Kaufman's interest in birth control as financially and politically motivated, rather than one rooted in providing women reproductive control, as it provided an easy way to address the social unrest tied to poverty and unemployment while avoiding social or economic reform.

=== Eastview Birth Control Trial ===
In September 1936, Dorothea Palmer, an Ottawa-based PIB employee, was arrested and charged under section 207 of the Criminal Code, which stated that the selling or advertising of contraceptives was illegal. She was arrested for promoting contraception to women in the poor Roman Catholic Ottawa community of Eastview. At the time 1,000 of the 4,000 people living in the area were on social assistance, many with large families.

Kaufman welcomed the chance to test Canada's laws in court. He spent the then considerable sum of $25,000 mounting a defence for Palmer in what would later be known as The Eastview Birth Control Trial (1936–1937). F. W. Wegenast, a fellow member of the Eugenics Society of Canada, was hired to defend Palmer in court. Kaufman testified during the trial, disputing a claim that his interest in birth control was commercially driven, explaining his actions were philanthropic in nature. He was also asked about the services provided to employees following visits from Weber, swearing that some seasonal employees were provided with birth control while sterilizations had been arranged for others who requested the procedure.

On March 17, 1937, Palmer was acquitted based on the conclusion that her actions passed the criminal code's pro bono publico clause and were carried out in the interest of the public good. The verdict was challenged in the Ontario Court of Appeal, but ultimately upheld. In comments following the trial, Palmer explained her position as having had to do the "dirty work" on behalf of men involved with the birth control movement. Although contraception was not fully legalized in Canada until 1969, Palmer was the only person to be prosecuted for providing information about birth control.

== Philanthropy ==
Kaufman was a generous benefactor of Kitchener's public works and services, including the donation of three parks – Kaufman, Hillside and Huron. He and his wife donated the funds for an addition to the Emmanuel Evangelical Church, which was dedicated in their honour in 1938. Kaufman was a member of the city's Planning Commission for 36 years and continued his family's active support of the YMCA and its various activities. Kaufman also served on the Kitchener Hospital Board and was a member of the first Board of Governors at the University of Waterloo. The A.R. Kaufman Charitable Foundation was founded in 1973 to manage donations. Following his death in 1979, remaining assets totalling close to one million dollars were distributed to various projects, including $665,000 put toward the construction of what would become the A.R. Kaufman Family YMCA.

== Death and legacy ==
In 1964, Kaufman was named Citizen of the Year by the Kitchener-Waterloo Jaycees, recognized for his work in civic planning and planned parenthood. Kaufman was honoured along with Elizabeth Bagshaw, Lise Fortier, George C. and Barbara Cadbury, by Ortho Pharmaceutical Ltd. in 1973 for their roles in advancing family planning in Canada. Kaufman was again honoured in 1976 by Planned Parenthood of Ontario for his work in advancing access to birth control and family planning services. Kaufman is a member of the Waterloo Region Hall of Fame and in 1973 Kitchener's A R Kaufman Public School was named in his honour.

Kaufman died in his sleep on February 1, 1979.

In 2021, a Waterloo Region District School Board school board committee reviewed school names. It noted Kaufman's efforts to sterilize low-income, working-class employees and those with physical or mental disabilities. In April 2023, Trustees at the Waterloo Region District School Board voted to rename the school from "A.R. Kaufman Public School" to "Hillside Public School".
