= Royal Commission on the Status of Women =

- Commissioners: Florence Bird (Chair); Jacques Henripin; John Peters Humphrey; Lola M. Lange; Jeanne Lapointe; Elsie Gregory MacGill; Doris Ogilvie
- Inquiry period: 16 February 1967 – 28 September 1970
- Authorized: Order in Council P.C. 1967-312

The Royal Commission on the Status of Women was a Canadian Royal Commission that examined the status of women and recommended steps that might be taken by the federal government to ensure equal opportunities with men and women in all aspects of Canadian society. The Commission commenced on 16 February 1967 as an initiative of Prime Minister Lester B. Pearson. Public sessions were conducted the following year to accept public comment for the commission to consider as it formulated its recommendations. Florence Bird was the commission's chair.

In Canada, 32 women's groups had formed. As a result, Pearson created the Royal Commission on the Status of Women to ensure equality for women, and was the first Commission to be chaired by women. The Commission wrote reports to the government about issues regarding pay, child care, birth control and education. The government responded to these issues by creating the Status of Women in 1971 to inform the public about these issues.

== History of Commission ==
In the mid-1960s, activist Laura Sabia led a coalition of 32 Canadian women's groups in carrying out a national campaign demanding action against gender inequality in society. The coalition formed the national Committee for the Equality of Women (CEW) in 1966, with Sabia as chair, and asked the government to establish a formal royal commission. If their demands were to go unmet, CEW promised that "two million women would march on Parliament Hill" in protest.

In 1967, in response to the rising public pressure, Prime Minister Lester B. Pearson set up the Royal Commission on the Status of Women in Canada with the mandate to "inquire into and report on the status of women in Canada, and to make specific recommendations to the federal government to ensure equality for women in all aspects of society."

== Commissioners ==
Florence Bird, a journalist and broadcaster from Ottawa, was appointed chairperson of the commission. This marked the first time a Royal Commission of inquiry had been chaired by a woman. Bird was associated with the Canadian Senate in 1978 and was part of the Royal Commission in 1967. Since she was part of the Royal Commission's chair, she was given thousands of letters from public hearings concerning women's rights. The arguments in the letters from common people mostly stated that men and women were seen as equal, but they were not in many ways. The main argument Bird covered was inequality in pay. Women were earning half of what men earned for the same job. Bird's commission also fought for their right to abortion and birth control access.

Elsie MacGill (1905 – 1980) was an active feminist and the first female aeronautical engineer. During the Second World War, she had worked as chief aeronautical engineer for Canadian Car & Foundry and oversaw the mass production of Hawker Hurricane fighter planes, which led media to give her the nickname “Queen of the Hurricanes.” MacGill had grown up with a keen interest in women's rights: her mother had broken ground as one of the first female judges in Canada, while her maternal grandmother had been a suffragist. Before joining the commission, MacGill had served as national president of the Canadian Federation of Business and Professional Women's Clubs, and she would go on to become noted as a vocal critic of discrimination against women in engineering. Because of her workforce experience, she advocated for women in the workforce. MacGill was heavily involved with women being paid for maternity leave. As a liberal feminist, MacGill believed that women should also have full control over their bodies, and should have the right to abort, much like Bird.

Lola M. Lange was from Claresholm, Alberta, and had a background in farming and community activism.

Jeanne Lapointe was a literature professor at Université Laval. She had previous commissioner experience as part of the Royal Commission of Inquiry on Education in the province of Quebec. After her work with the commission, she would go on to make significant academic contributions to psychoanalytic literary analysis and feminist analysis.

Doris Ogilvie was a juvenile court judge from Fredericton, New Brunswick. She would later go on to chair the Canadian Commission of the International Year of the Child.

Jacques Henripin was a professor of demography at Université de Montréal, noted for his key contributions to the field of study in Canada. After his time on the commission, he would go on to work at Statistics Canada and serve as a council member for the Social Sciences and Humanities Research Council of Canada, before receiving the Order of Canada in 1988.

John Peters Humphrey was a law professor at McGill University, known for having drafted the United Nations Universal Declaration of Human Rights during the 1940s. Humphrey was appointed following the resignation of Donald R. Gordon, a journalist and educator.

== Results ==
Azilda Lapierre Marchand prepared a report on behalf of the Women's Association for Education and Social Action (French: L'Association féminine d'éducation et d'action sociale, AFÉAS) evaluating the invisibility of women's work, and presented the findings to the commission. She argued that their unpaid labor as homemakers and workers in family enterprises was undervalued and ignored by society.

The Commission discovered that:

- in 1970 only 3.9% of managers were women;
- although 8 out of 10 provinces had equal-pay laws, women were still paid less than men for doing the same work; and
- two thirds of people that were on welfare were women

In 1970, a report came out with 167 recommendations to ensure that men and women had equal opportunities. Some recommendations were:

- "gender" and "marital status" be prohibited as grounds for discrimination by employers
- training programs offered by the federal government be made more open to women
- the federal government name more women judges to all courts within its jurisdiction
- more qualified women from each province be appointed to the Senate as seats became vacant, until a more equitable balance between men and women were achieved
- employed women be granted eighteen weeks of unemployment benefits for maternity leave.
- birth control
- pensions
- day care
- educational opportunities for women

As a result, the Commission helped establish an agenda of reform for women's-rights groups in the 1970s.

== See also ==
- Women's rights in Canada
- Department for Women and Gender Equality
