= Azilda Lapierre Marchand =

Quebec feminist, educator and social activist (1918–2010)

Azilda Lapierre Marchand CM CQ
- Born: Azilda Lapierre; 8 December 1918; Ange-Gardien, Quebec, Canada
- Died: 9 May 2010 (aged 91); Montreal, Quebec, Canada
- Occupations: Educator, feminist activist

Azilda Lapierre Marchand CM CQ (8 December 1918 – 9 May 2010) was a Quebec feminist, educator and social activist. A co-founder of the Association féminine d'éducation et d'action sociale (AFEAS), she served as its provincial president from 1970 to 1975. Her work focused particularly on women's access to education and on the social, economic and legal recognition of women's work, including unpaid work in the home and in family businesses.

Marchand served on Quebec's Conseil supérieur de l'éducation from 1972 to 1985 and on the Conseil du statut de la femme from 1975 to 1980. She participated in the preparation of the council's 1978 policy document Pour les Québécoises : égalité et indépendance. She received a Governor General's Award in Commemoration of the Persons Case in 1984, was appointed a Knight of the National Order of Quebec and a Member of the Order of Canada in 1985, and received an honorary doctorate from the Université de Sherbrooke in 1987.

== Early life and education ==
Azilda Lapierre was born on 8 December 1918 in Ange-Gardien, Quebec. A profile based on an interview with Marchand, first published in 1983, states that her family moved to Lachine when she was two months old. She trained as a teacher at the École normale Marier-Rivier in Saint-Hyacinthe. She subsequently taught in rural schools in the Ange-Gardien area.

In 1942, she married Jean-Maurice Marchand of Ange-Gardien. The couple had nine children.

Her involvement in women's organizations began early. AFEAS's institutional history credits her with founding the Jeunesse agricole catholique féminine in the Diocese of Saint-Hyacinthe in 1937. She later belonged to the Union catholique des fermières and, from 1950, the Union catholique des femmes rurales. In 1961, she became president of the latter's Saint-Hyacinthe federation.

== AFEAS and women's social action ==
Beginning in 1963, Marchand was responsible for a coordinating committee bringing together women's organizations that were considering the creation of a new provincial association. The committee's work led in 1966 to the creation of AFEAS through the reorganization and merger of existing women's associations.

During the formation of AFEAS, Marchand supported establishing the new organization as an autonomous women's social-action movement rather than placing it under direct ecclesiastical control. Historian Micheline Dumont describes Marchand as resisting pressure from bishops and chaplains to give the organization an explicitly Catholic identity, arguing that the women themselves should determine its orientation.

Marchand developed and taught courses for women in social education and applied psychology relating to childhood and adolescence; some of these courses were later taken up by Quebec's adult-education administration. A social-education course she prepared under AFEAS auspices was published in 1969.

In 1967, Marchand represented AFEAS at a congress of the World Union of Catholic Women's Organisations in Rome. In 1970, she became AFEAS's first elected provincial president and remained in office until 1975. The association's approach linked popular education with social action, seeking to strengthen women's capacity to understand and act on issues affecting their lives.

=== Recognition of women's unpaid work ===
One of Marchand's principal concerns at AFEAS was the economic recognition of women's work. She argued that women were already working, whether in the home, in family enterprises or in the paid labour market, and drew particular attention to women working without remuneration in businesses owned by their husbands or families. She also publicly criticized the Royal Commission on the Status of Women in Canada for giving insufficient attention to unpaid work in family businesses.

Under her presidency, AFEAS began a research project in 1974 on the legal and financial position of women who worked in their husbands' for-profit businesses without being partners, shareholders or co-owners. A November 1974 letter signed by Marchand as president described the project as a study of the legal and financial status of the femme collaboratrice. The research continued through 1977 and contributed to the creation of the Association des femmes collaboratrices.

At a 1979 committee hearing of the National Assembly of Quebec, an AFEAS vice-president introduced Marchand as a former president and the initiator of the femme collaboratrice project. AFEAS argued that these women should have the economic value of their work formally recognized and gain access to remuneration and social protections associated with paid work.

== Public service and education ==
Marchand served on Quebec's Conseil supérieur de l'éducation from 1972 to 1985. During the 1970s, she chaired its Commission de l'enseignement collégial and later served on the Commission de l'enseignement supérieur.

From 1975 to 1980, Marchand was a member of the Conseil du statut de la femme. She participated in the preparation of the council's 1978 policy document, Pour les Québécoises : égalité et indépendance. The document lists Marchand among the council's members; the council stated that its members had unanimously accepted the objectives set out in the policy.

In 1975, Marchand attended the World Conference of the International Women's Year in Mexico City as a delegate associated with AFEAS and the Conseil du statut de la femme. She also represented AFEAS in work with the Canadian Commission for UNESCO.

== Later life ==
Marchand remained involved in community activities after leaving provincial public bodies. In 1980, she helped found the Société d'histoire des Quatre Lieux, a regional historical society centred on the Ange-Gardien area. She also wrote a local history, La petite histoire de l'Ange-Gardien, published in 1981.

Marchand died in Montreal on 9 May 2010, aged 91.

== Honours and legacy ==
In 1984, Marchand received a Governor General's Award in Commemoration of the Persons Case for her work to improve the status of women in Canada. She was also made an honorary member of the Canadian Research Institute for the Advancement of Women in 1984.

In 1985, she was appointed a Knight of the National Order of Quebec and a Member of the Order of Canada. In 1987, the Université de Sherbrooke awarded her an honorary doctorate.

AFEAS established the Prix Azilda-Marchand in her honour. The organization states that the prize has been awarded annually since 1984 to recognize social-action initiatives undertaken by its local associations.

== Selected works ==
- Cours de formation sociale (1969)
- La petite histoire de l'Ange-Gardien (1981)
