= Jacob Kaufman =

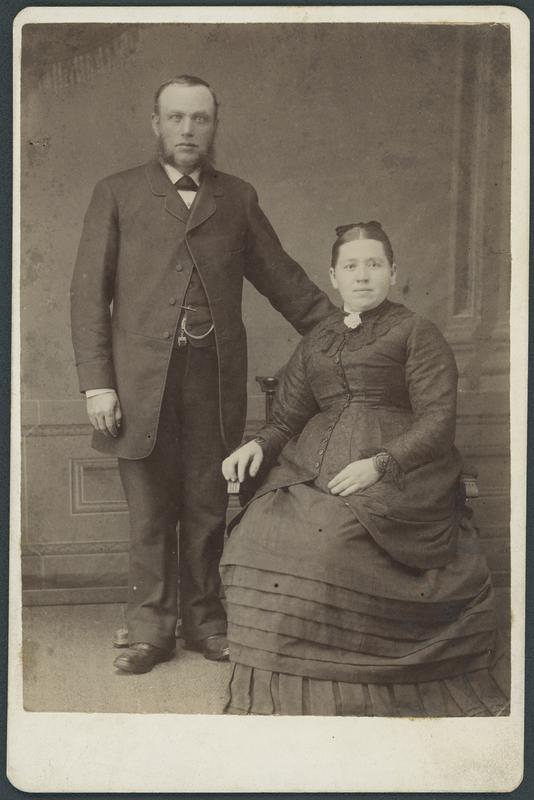
- Jacob and Mary Kaufman c. 1877
- Born: July 15, 1847; North Easthope Township, Canada West
- Died: April 20, 1920 (aged 72); Kitchener, Ontario, Canada
- Resting place: Mount Hope Cemetery, Kitchener, Ontario, Canada
- Children: 4, including A.R. Kaufman and Emma Kaufman

Jacob Kaufman (15 July 1847 – 20 April 1920) was a manufacturer and industrialist in Berlin, now Kitchener, Ontario, Canada. He built a large lumber operation and pioneered the manufacturing of rubber outerwear.

== Biography ==
Kaufman was born July 15, 1847, in North Easthope Township to German parents, Joseph Kauffman and Anna Stroh. One of ten children, Kaufman only attended school during the winter months, working on the family farm the remainder of the year. At the age of 22 he accepted a position in Gads Hill working for Henry Ratz as a sawyer, where he remained for eight years. Kaufman married Ratz's daughter, Mary (1856-1943), in 1877 and moved to Berlin, Ontario. Together they had seven children, though only four - Emma (1881-1979), Alvin (1885-1979), Milton (born 1886) and Edna (1891-1983) - would live to adulthood.

Following his move to Berlin, Kaufman founded a planing mill with assistance from his father-in-law. To address a dwindling supply of lumber in the region, Kaufman purchased a plot of land in Muskoka, operating sawmills in Rosseau Falls and Trout Creek to help meet demand. Although his decision to locate the mill outside of city was initially questioned by friends, the success of the business resulted in multiple expansions and allowed Kaufman to buy out his father-in-law. In 1888 the original factory, at the time deemed inadequate, was enclosed by a new building and torn down only after the new building was complete, an approach that caused operations to be halted for only ten days. In 1897, Kaufman built a Victorian style home at 621 King Street West with an office window that allowed him to survey his rubber factory. Sold in the late 1940s, it housed the Ratz-Bechtel Funeral Home funeral home until 2015.

Kaufman is credited with establishing Kitchener's rubber industry. In 1899 he founded Berlin Rubber Manufacturing Company Limited alongside A. L. Breithaupt, Louis Weber and George Schlee. The plant was located on Margaret Avenue, at one time employing 65 people and producing about 800–1,000 pairs of rubber boots a day. Although the company was successful, Kaufman had a falling out with the group, resulting in him leaving to launch his own business. He founded the Merchants Rubber Co. in 1903 with Talmon Henry Rieder. The company specialized in rubber-based garments and footwear for fisherman and miners and was sold in 1906 to the Montreal-based Canadian Consolidated Rubber Company, that also acquired Berlin Rubber. The following year Kaufman founded the Kaufman Rubber Company Limited with his son A.R. Kaufman, which would go on to become Kaufman Footwear.

A resident of Kitchener for 43 years, Kaufman was a member of the Zion Evangelical Church played an active role local government, believing in public ownership of local utilities. He served as a member of commissions related to water and light, helping to electrify the city and establish a sewage disposal system.

=== Death ===
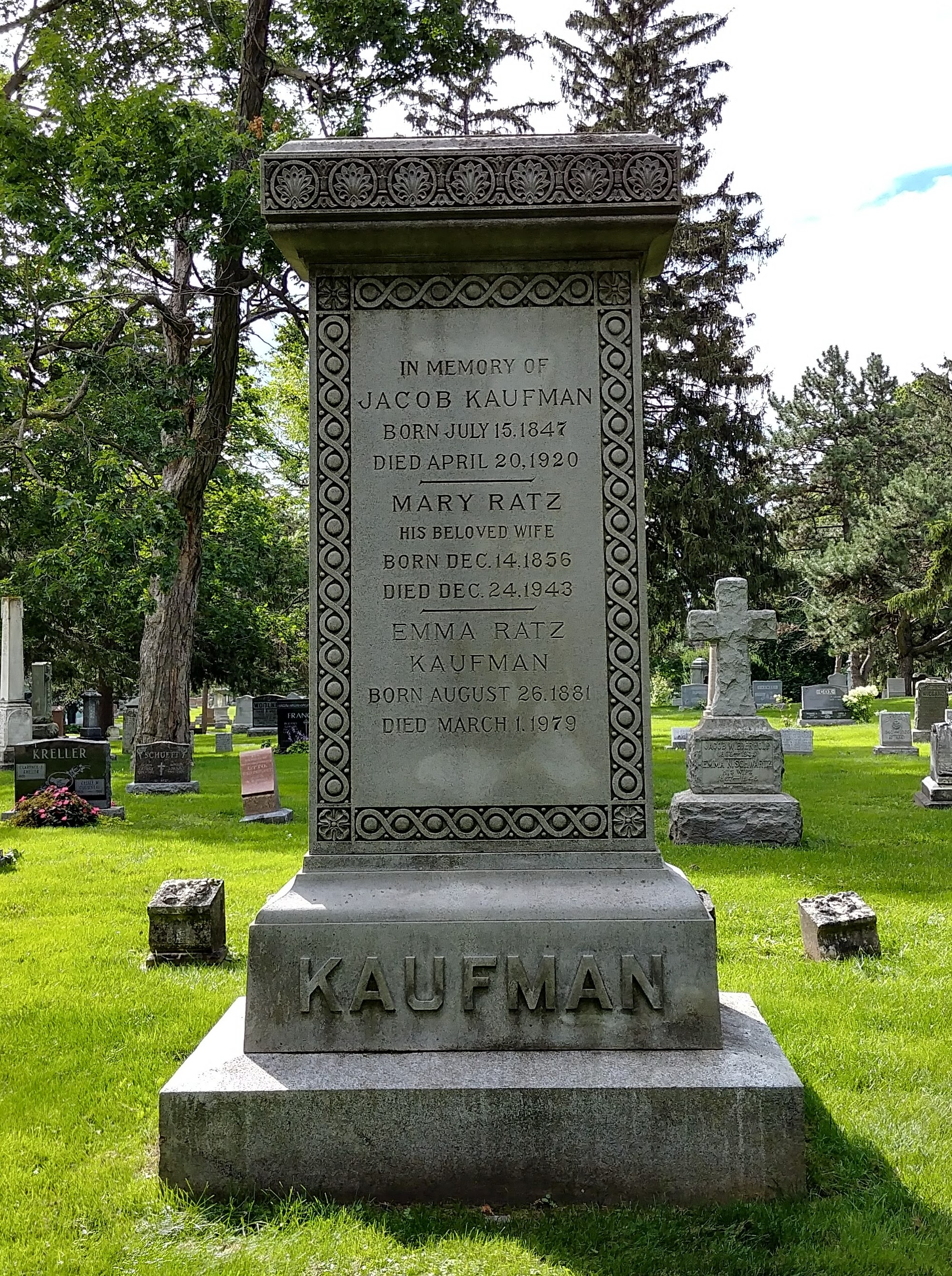
Headstone of Jacob, Mary and Emma Ratz Kaufman in Kitchener-Waterloo Mount Hope Cemetery

Kaufman died on April 20, 1920, at home in Kitchener. His estate was valued at $278,879, $50,000 of which was designated for distribution to charitable, religious or educational endeavours at the discretion of his wife and children, who acted as executors. He was remembered by Chronicle Telegraph as a "town builder" for his role and influence in the development of various local industries. He was buried at Mount Hope Cemetery in the Kaufman family plot.
