= Jeanne Lapointe =

Canadian academic and intellectual (1915-2006)

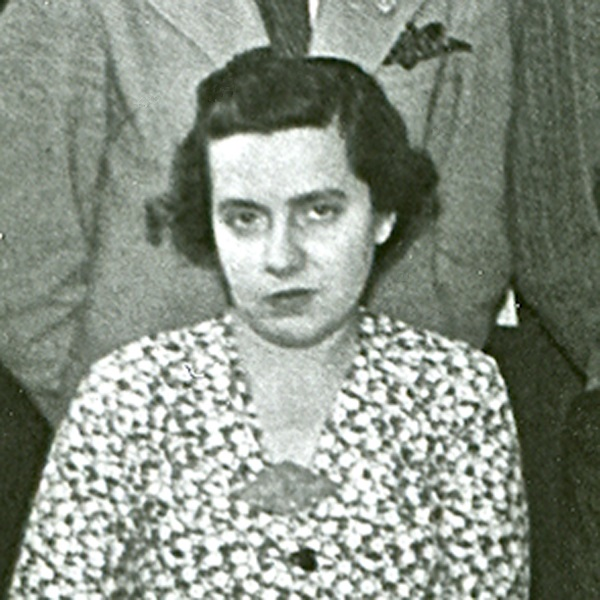
Jeanne Lapointe

Jeanne Lapointe (September 7, 1915, Chicoutimi - January 7, 2006, Quebec City) was a Canadian academic and intellectual.

In 1940, she was the first female professor of literature in the Faculty of Arts of the Laval University. Her essays and actions contributed to the advent of literary modernity in Québec, thanks to her intellectual debates published in the journal Cité Libre (1950) and its influence on major Quebec writers such as Marie-Claire Blais, Anne Hébert and Gabrielle Roy, for whom she played the role of mentor. Her actions as Commissioner on the Parent Commission and Bird Commission during the Quiet Revolution gave a political forum for progressive ideas about education in Quebec and the status of women in Canada. It was then that her words were defined ironically against the discourse of domination and sexual inequality, rhetoric she developed in psychoanalytic literary analysis (1970) and feminism (1980-1990). Correspondence filed with Library and Archives Canada, documents communication with many intellectuals as well as Quebec and European writers such as Jean Le Moyne, Louky Bersianik, Pierre Gélinas, Judith Jasmin, Félix-Antoine Savard, Pierre Elliott Trudeau, Driss Chraïbi, Nathalie Sarraute, and others.

== Commemoration ==
=== Events ===
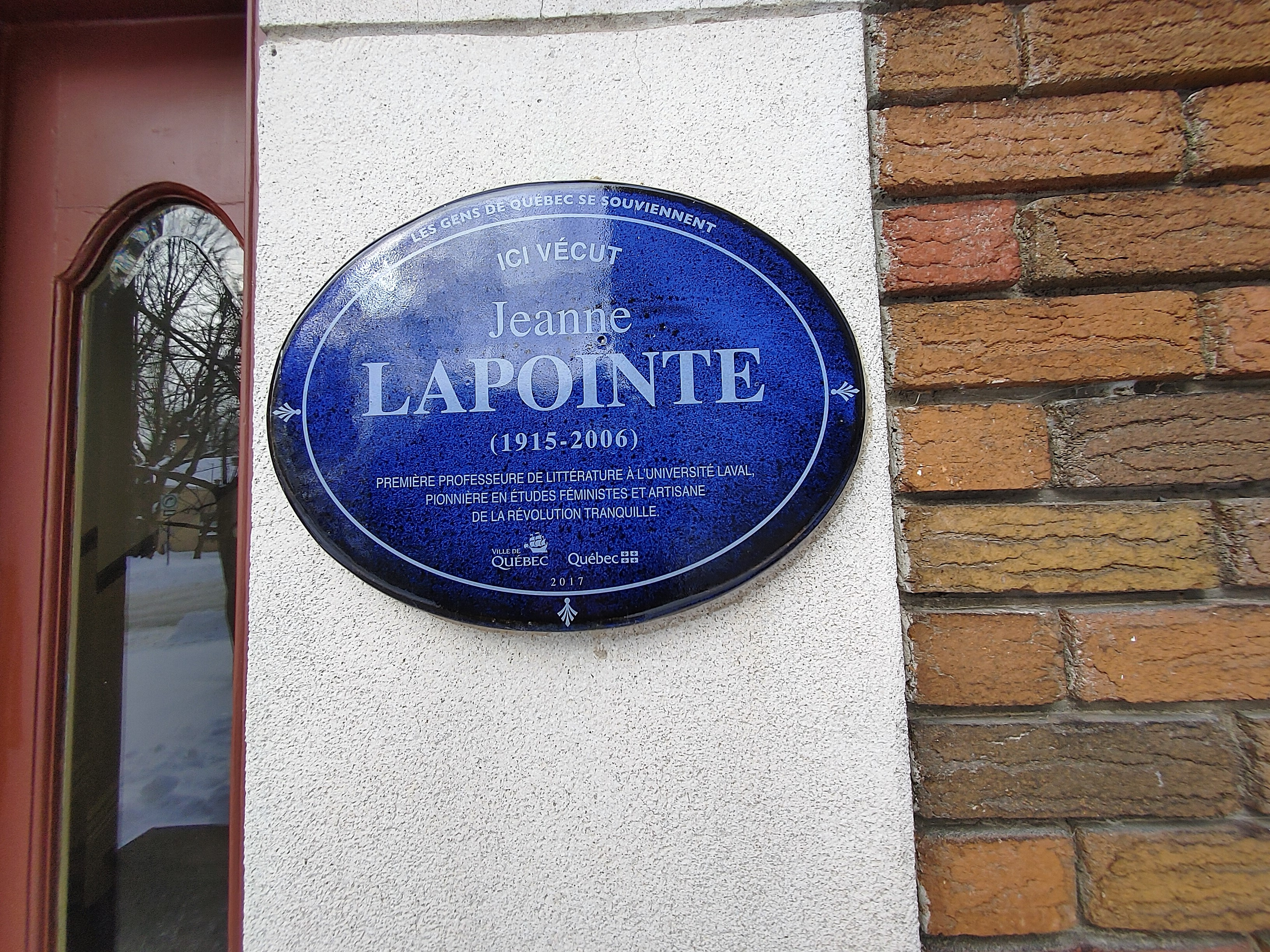
10, avenue Wilfrid-Laurier, Québec

- The exhibition "Jeanne Lapointe, pioneer of the Faculty of Arts of Laval University (1937-2007)" is presented in the fall of 2007 at the Jean-Charles-Bonenfant Library of Laval University, on the occasion of the 70th anniversary of the Faculty of Arts (1937-2007). Commissioner: Chantal Théry.
- A memorial plaque Here lived Jeanne Lapointe is unveiled by the City of Quebec, May 28, 2018, in tribute to an exceptional woman who has marked the history of Quebec City: "Jeanne Lapointe : Première professeure de littérature à l'Université Laval, pionnière en études féministes au Québec et artisane de la Révolution Tranquille" (Jeanne Lapointe: First professor of literature at the University of Quebec Laval University, pioneer in feminist studies in Quebec and craftswoman of the Quiet Revolution).
- The launch of Jeanne Lapointe's first book, Rebelle et volontaire. Anthologie 1937-1995, takes place on October 16, 2019 at the feminist bookshop L'Euguélionne. All the women working together on the book are there: Marie-Andrée Beaudet, Mylène Bédard, Claudia Raby, Lori Saint-Martin and Juliette Bernatchez.
- In November 2019, the journal Études littéraires published an issue devoted to Jeanne Lapointe, under the direction of Marie-Andrée Beaudet and Mylène Bédard.

=== Creation of awards on behalf of Jeanne Lapointe ===
==== Jeanne-Lapointe Fund ====
The Jeanne-Lapointe Fund for Feminist Studiescomes from a donation made by Jeanne Lapointe to the R.A.F Foundation (Research and Action for Women). It is used to award bursaries for excellence as well as to support new research projects, feminist community services, and training and outreach activities for women's studies. The Claire-Bonenfant Chair - Women, Knowledge and Societies assumes the evaluation of submitted projects; the Fonds is under the responsibility of the Laval University Foundation.

==== Théry-Lapointe Scholarship ====
The Théry-Lapointe Scholarship was created by Chantal Théry, retired professor at Laval University. It is awarded annually to encourage the dissemination of feminist research and creation by graduate students in the Faculty of Arts and Humanities at Laval University.

==== Acfas Jeanne-Lapointe Award ====
The creation of the Acfas Jeanne-Lapointe Award was announced on November 15, 2019 by the French Association for the Advancement of Science (Acfas). It rewards the excellence and influence of the work and actions of a researcher in the field of educational sciences. The award is "named in honor of Jeanne Lapointe, member of the Royal Commission on Education in the Province of Quebec (Parent Commission), the only lay woman, lead author of the Parent report, and researcher in the humanities and social sciences. [It's a recognition of her] exceptional academic career. [She] was a pioneer in the francophone university world, where she worked for 47 years."

== Bibliography ==
=== Works ===
==== Essays and studies ====
- « Sillage sur la Mer Caraïbe », Regards, issue 3 (décembre 1940), p. 103-107.
- Un professeur aux cours d’été, « Juillet 44 à l’Université Laval », Le Travailleur, vol. XIV, issue 42 (19 octobre 1944), p. 1-2.
- « Pour une morale de l’intelligence », Le Devoir littéraire, 15 novembre 1955, p. 19.
- « La prédication et son auditoire », Revue dominicaine, vol. LXII, issue 2 (septembre 1956), p. 74-84.
- « Humanisme et humanités : étude présentée à la Commission du Programme de la Faculté des Arts de Laval », 1958, Bibliothèque et Archives nationales du Québec (Montréal), Centre de conservation, ms. 233158 CON.
- « Vacances en URSS avec l’Intourist », Cité Libre, issue 24 (janvier-février 1960), p. 11-13.
- « L’éducation au Canada français », dans Canada, Éditions Burin/Martinsart, Paris, 2008, p. 179-256 .
- « Jeanne Lapointe », entretien du 10 octobre 1995 sur le Rapport Parent, dans Gabriel Gosselin et Claude Lessard (dir.), Les deux principales réformes de l’Éducation du Québec moderne. Témoignages de ceux et celles qui les ont initiées, Presses de l’Université Laval, Québec, 2008, p. 51-66.

==== Criticism of Quebec literature ====
- «Quelques apports positifs de notre littérature d’imagination », Cité Libre, issue 10 (octobre 1954), p. 17 à 36. [Repris dans Gilles Marcotte, Présence de la critique. Critique et littérature contemporaines au Canada français, HMH, Montréal, 1971 [1966], p. 103-120].
- « De notre littérature. II- Réponse à la lettre précédente », Cité Libre, issue 12 (mai 1955), p. 34-39.
- « Saint-Denys Garneau et l’image », Cité Libre, issue 27 (mai 1960), p. 26-28 et 32. [Repris dans Gilles Marcotte, Présence de la critique, op. cit., p. 123-130].
- « Mystère de la parole par Anne Hébert », Cité Libre, issue 36 (avril 1961), p. 21-22. [Repris dans Gilles Marcotte, Présence de la critique, op. cit., p. 120-123].
- « Histoire de la littérature canadienne-française by Gérard Tougas », French Studies, vol. XV, no 3, juillet 1961, p. 282–284.
- « La sociologie comme critique de la littérature : commentaire », dans Fernand Dumont et Jean-Charles Falardeau (dir.), Littérature et société canadiennes-françaises, Presses de l’Université Laval, Québec, 1964, p. 241-244.
- « Gérard Tougas: History of French-Canadian Literature (second edition) », French Studies, vol. XXII, no 1, janvier 1968, p. 88-89.
- « Une petite aventure en littérature expérimentale », dans Frank Scott et Anne Hébert, Dialogue sur la traduction : à propos du Tombeau des rois, Bibliothèque québécoise, Québec, 2000 [1970], p. 19-28.
- « Hommage à Gabrielle Roy 1909-1983 », La Vie en rose, issue 13 (septembre-octobre 1983), p. 51. Read online
- « Notes sur Le Premier jardin d’Anne Hébert », Écrits du Canada français, issue 65 (1989), p. 47-50.
- « Hommage à Anne Hébert », Arcade, issue 49 (1996), p. 88-91.

==== Psychoanalytic criticism ====
- « Attention flottante sur La Chamade, de Françoise Sagan. Où trouver le langage de l’inconscient dans un roman sans qualité? », Institut de psychothérapie du Québec, Québec, tapuscrit sans date.
- « Notes sur rire narcissisme et intersubjectivité dans Vous les entendez?, roman de Nathalie Sarraute », Institut de psychothérapie du Québec, Québec, tapuscrit sans date.
- « Lecture psychanalytique de La Maison de Petrodava, roman de Virgil Georghiu », dans Études en psychothérapie, vol. 1, issue 4 (décembre 1971), p. 130-154.
- «To the lighthouse, de Virginia Woolf, et le monde de la féerie fusionnelle », Études en psychothérapie, vol. 1, issue 10 (juin 1972), p. 354-385.

==== Feminist critique ====
- « Du discours de domination », dans Gabrielle Frémont (dir.), Études littéraires, vol. 12, issue 3 (décembre 1979), p. 351-355.
- « La femme comme non-sujet dans les sciences dites humaines », Institut Simone de Beauvoir, Université Concordia, Montréal, mai 1980, tapuscrit disponible au GREMF de l’Université Laval.
- « Research on Women : a Question of Life and Identity », Le Bulletin/Newsletters, vol. 3, issue 6 (novembre 1982), Université Concordia, p. 9-11.
- « Le meurtre des femmes chez le théologien et le pornographe », dans Suzanne Lamy et Irène Pagès (dir.), Féminité, subversion, écriture, Remue-Ménage, Montréal, 1983, p. 209-223 [Les Cahiers du GRIF (mars 1983), p. 43-53].
- Jeanne Lapointe et Margrit Eichler, Le traitement objectif des sexes dans la recherche, Conseil de recherches en sciences humaines du Canada, Ottawa, 1985.
- « Fantasmes/réalités », dans Pauline Fahmy (dir.), Les évènements de Polytechnique. Analyses et propositions d’action, Actes d’un colloque tenu à la Faculté des sciences de l’éducation de l’Université Laval le 23 janvier 1990, Le GREMF édite, cahier 4, 1990, p. 35-38.
- « A Feminist Perspective in Literature » (traduction de Mary Brennan), in Winnie Tomm (dir.), The Effects of Feminist Approaches on Research Methodologies, Waterloo, Wilfrid Laurier University Press, 1989, p. 159-170 [« Perspectives féministes en littérature », dans Roberta Mura (dir.), Un savoir à notre image? Critiques féministes des disciplines, vol. 1, Adage, EF, Montréal, 1991, p. 37-48].
- « Préface », dans Claudine Baudoux, La gestion en éducation : une affaire d'hommes ou de femmes? Pratiques et représentations du pouvoir, Cap Rouge, Presses Inter universitaires, 1994, p. 1-2.

==== Radio chronicles ====
- « Revue des Arts et des Lettres », series of fifteen radio chronicles presented on Radio-Collège, Radio-Canada, 1951-1954, Fonds Jeanne-Lapointe, série C.1, P 474, Université Laval [tapuscrit].
- « L’écrivain et son style », series of fifteen radio chronicles presented on Radio-Collège, Radio-Canada, from January 9 to April 17, 1955, Fonds Jeanne-Lapointe, série C.1, P 474, Université Laval [tapuscrit].

==== Anthology ====
Rebelle et volontaire. Anthologie 1937-1995 , directed by Marie-Andrée Beaudet, Mylène Bédard et Claudia Raby, with the collaboration of Juliette Bernatchez, Montréal, Leméac, 2019, 253 p.

=== Articles about Jeanne Lapointe (in french) ===
- « L'apport de Jeanne Lapointe au Québec moderne », Archives Radio-Canada, 14 janvier 2022.
- BARBEAU-LAVALETTE, Anaïs et Mathilde CINQ-MARS, « Jeanne Lapointe », in Nos héroïnes: 40 portraits de femmes québécoises, Montréal, Marchand de feuilles, 2018, p. 72-73.
- BEAUREGARD, Micheline et Chantal THÉRY, « Hommage à Jeanne Lapointe », Recherches féministes, vol. 19, No. 1 (2006), p. I-II.
- BEAUDET, Marie-Andrée et Mylène BÉDARD, « Présentation », Études littéraires, vol. 49, no 1 (2020) [publié en novembre 2019], p. 7-14.
- BÉDARD, Mylène, « La relation entre Jeanne Lapointe et Judith Jasmin comme point de départ d’une réflexion sur l’amitié féminine », dans Julie BEAULIEU, Andrien RANNAUD et Lori SAINT-MARTIN (dir.), Génération(s) au féminin et nouvelles perspectives féministes, Québec, Codicille (Coll. Prégnance), p. 13-31.
- BÉDARD, Mylène, « Jeanne Lapointe, mentore et amie », Études littéraires, vol. 49, no 1 (2020) [publié en novembre 2019], p. 65-80.
- BLAIS, Marie-Claire, « Jeanne Lapointe, une femme en avance sur son temps », Recherches sociographiques, vol. 47, No. 2 (mai-août 2006), p. 223-224.
- DAGENAIS, Huguette, « Inoubliable Jeanne Lapointe », in Le trait d’union, no 110 (septembre 2018), p. 7-8.
- DESAUTELS, Louise, « Le nom d’une femme pour un pavillon à l’Université Laval? », Le trait d’union, no 110 (septembre 2018), p. 8.
- DUVAL, Alexandre, « Le nom d'une femme pour un pavillon à l'Université Laval? », Radio-Canada, 8 avril 2018.
- GAGNON, Evelyn, « Jeanne Lapointe explique l’école nouvelle », Châtelaine, vol. 6, No. 3 (mars 1965), p. 38-39etp. 101-104.
- GAGNON, Madeleine, « Mémoire de Jeanne Lapointe », À bâbord!, Dossier « Femmes inspirées, femmes inspirantes », No. 44 (mai-avril 2012).
- LÉGER, Marthe, « Jeanne Lapointe et Marthe Blackburn: amitié et mentorat », Les Instantanés: la vitrine des archives de BAnQ, 12 août 2020.
- LIVERNOIS, Jonathan et Alex NOËL, « La lente intégration des femmes à l'université », Le Devoir, 10 juin 2017.
- NÉRON, Camille, « Jeanne Lapointe et son approche de la poésie : l’exigence de vérité », Études littéraires, vol. 49, no 1 (2020) [publié en novembre 2019], p. 41-52.
- NOËL, Alex, « L’ouverture d’un espace dialogique dans les interventions intellectuelles de Jeanne Lapointe », Mens, Vol. 18, No 1 (2017), p. 21–49.
- RABY, Claudia, « Jeanne Lapointe ou penser la critique littéraire », in Manon AUGER et Mélissa DUFOUR (dir.), Pré/textes: premiers regards sur la littérature et la culture, Québec, CRILCQ, Collection Interlignes, 2005, p. 33-49.
- RABY, Claudia, Le parcours critique de Jeanne Lapointe, Québec, Université Laval (master's thesis in letters), 2007, 133p.
- RABY, Claudia, « L'œuvre infinie de Jeanne Lapointe. Forger la critique littéraire féministe au Québec », in Chantal Savoie (dir.), Histoire littéraire des femmes. Cas et enjeux, Québec, Éditions Nota bene, Collection Séminaires, 2010, p. 253-289.
- RABY, Claudia, « Transformer le monde par la critique littéraire : regard stylistique sur les chroniques radiophoniques de Jeanne Lapointe », Recherches féministes, vol. 24, No. 1 (2011).
- RABY, Claudia, « Jeanne Lapointe », in Yvan LAMONDE and al. (dir.), Dictionnaire des intellectuel.les du Québec, Presses de l’Université de Montréal, coll. "Corpus", 2017, p. 196-197.
- RABY, Claudia, « L’humanisme révolté de Jeanne Lapointe », in Karine CELLARD et Vincent LAMBERT [dir.], Espaces critiques. Écrire sur la littérature et les autres arts au Québec (1920-1960), Québec, Presses de l'Université Laval (Coll. Cultures québécoises), 2018, p. 291-310.
- RABY, Claudia, « La morale de l’intelligence, gage de liberté chez Jeanne Lapointe », Études littéraires, vol. 49, no 1 (2020) [publié en novembre 2019], p. 15-24.
- RABY, Claudia, « Bibliographie de Jeanne Lapointe », Études littéraires, vol. 49, no 1 (2020) [publié en novembre 2019], p. 99-104.
- RABY, Claudia, « La variable du genre dans le traitement biographique de l’intellectuelle », Mens – Revue d’histoire intellectuelle et culturelle, vol. 22, n^{os} 1-2 (automne 2021-printemps 2022) [publié en janvier 2023], p. 9-34.
- RABY, Claudia, « Jeanne Lapointe. De la critique littéraire moderne à l’action féministe », dans Claude CORBO et Sophie MONTREUIL [dir.], Faire connaissance. 100 ans de sciences en français, Montréal, Éditions Cardinal/Acfas, 2023, p. 100-103.
- RABY, Claudia, « Les femmes professeures à l’université francophone au Québec : une histoire de résistance et de renouveau », Magazine de l’Acfas [en ligne], dossier « Enjeux de la recherche : 100 ans de recherches », mis à jour le : 13 septembre 2023.
- Rédaction, « Jeanne Lapointe (1915-2006) », Recherches sociographiques, vol. 47, No. 2 (mai-août 2006), p. 222.
- ROBERT, Lucie, « La modernité littéraire », L’Institution du littéraire au Québec, Presses de l’Université Laval, Québec, 1989, p. 207-211.
- ROBERT, Lucie, « Jeanne Lapointe et Eva Kushner. Deux femmes chez les sociologues », Études littéraires, vol. 49, no 1 (2020) [publié en novembre 2019], p. 25-40.
- ROY-BLAIS, Caroline, « Un pavillon Jeanne-Lapointe à l'Université Laval? », Québec Réveille (report), CKIA, 18 avril 2018.
- SAINT-MARTIN, Lori, « Féminin singulier, transmission plurielle », Études littéraires, vol. 49, no 1 (2020) [publié en novembre 2019], p. 81-88.
- SAMSON, Henri, « Une œuvre de Virginia Woolf analysée par Jeanne Lapointe. Introduction », Études en psychothérapie, vol. 1, No. 10 (juin 1972), p. 351-352.
- SAVARD, Fred, « Destins de femmes, destins de science », La Balado de Fred Savard, avec Louise Bienvenue, Alexandre Klein et Claudia Raby, saison 5, épisode 36, 17 juin 2023.
- SIMARD, Claude, « Pour un pavillon Jeanne-Lapointe à l'Université Laval », Le Devoir and Le Soleil, 21 avril 2018. Read Le Devoir online Read Le Soleil online.
- SCHWARTWALD, Robert, « Littérature d’imagination valorisée », Institution littéraire, modernité et question nationale au Québec (1940 à 1976), Québec, Université Laval (doctoral thesis in Letters), 1985, p. 69-97.
- THÉRY, Chantal, avec la collaboration de Claudia RABY, « Jeanne Lapointe : un art et une éthique du dialogue », Recherches féministes, vol. 21, No. 1 (2008), p. 59-78.
- THÉRY, Chantal (dir.), Jeanne Lapointe. Artisane de la Révolution tranquille. Hommages de Monique Bégin, Louky Bersianik, Marie-Claire Blais, Gabriel Gagnon, Madeleine Gagnon, Gilles Marcotte, Guy Rocher, Chantal Théry, Montréal, éditions Triptyque, 2013, 101 p.
- THÉRY, Chantal, « Chronologie de Jeanne Lapointe », Études littéraires, vol. 49, no 1 (2020) [publié en novembre 2019], p. 95-98.
- VENNE, Jean-François, « Les sciences de l'éducation auront bientôt leur prix », dans Le Devoir, 16 novembre 2019.
- WATTEYNE, Nathalie, « Jeanne Lapointe et Anne Hébert : une longue amitié », Études littéraires, vol. 49, no 1 (2020) [publié en novembre 2019], p. 53-64.
