= Doris Ogilvie =

Canadian activist

Doris Ogilvie (1919–2012) was a Canadian judge and activist.

A graduate in law from the University of New Brunswick, Ogilvie was a judge in both the juvenile and provincial court systems. She chaired the Canadian Commission of the International Year of the Child, and was a member of the Royal Commission on the Status of Women.
