= Judy Fudge =

Labour law scholar

Judy Fudge is a scholar of labour law and the LIUNA Enrico Henry Mancinelli Professor in Global Labour Issues at McMaster University. Before coming to McMaster, Fudge was a professor of law at the University of Kent and the Landsdowne Chair in Law at the University of Victoria Faculty of Law. In 2019, she received the Bora Laskin Award from the University of Toronto in recognition of her work on labour law.

== Publications ==
- Fudge, Judy; Tucker, Eric (2004). Labour before the Law: The Regulation of Workers' Collective Action in Canada, 1900–1948. University of Toronto Press. ISBN 978-1-4426-5727-4. OCLC 903968592.
- Fudge, Judy; Owens, Rosemary J. (2006). Precarious Work, Women, and the New Economy: The Challenge to Legal Norms. Bloomsbury Publishing. ISBN 978-1-4725-6365-1. OCLC 648018074.
- Judy Fudge and Eric Tucker (eds.), Work on Trial – Canadian Labour Law Struggles (Toronto: Osgoode Society / Irwin Law, 2010).
