= L'Euguélionne =

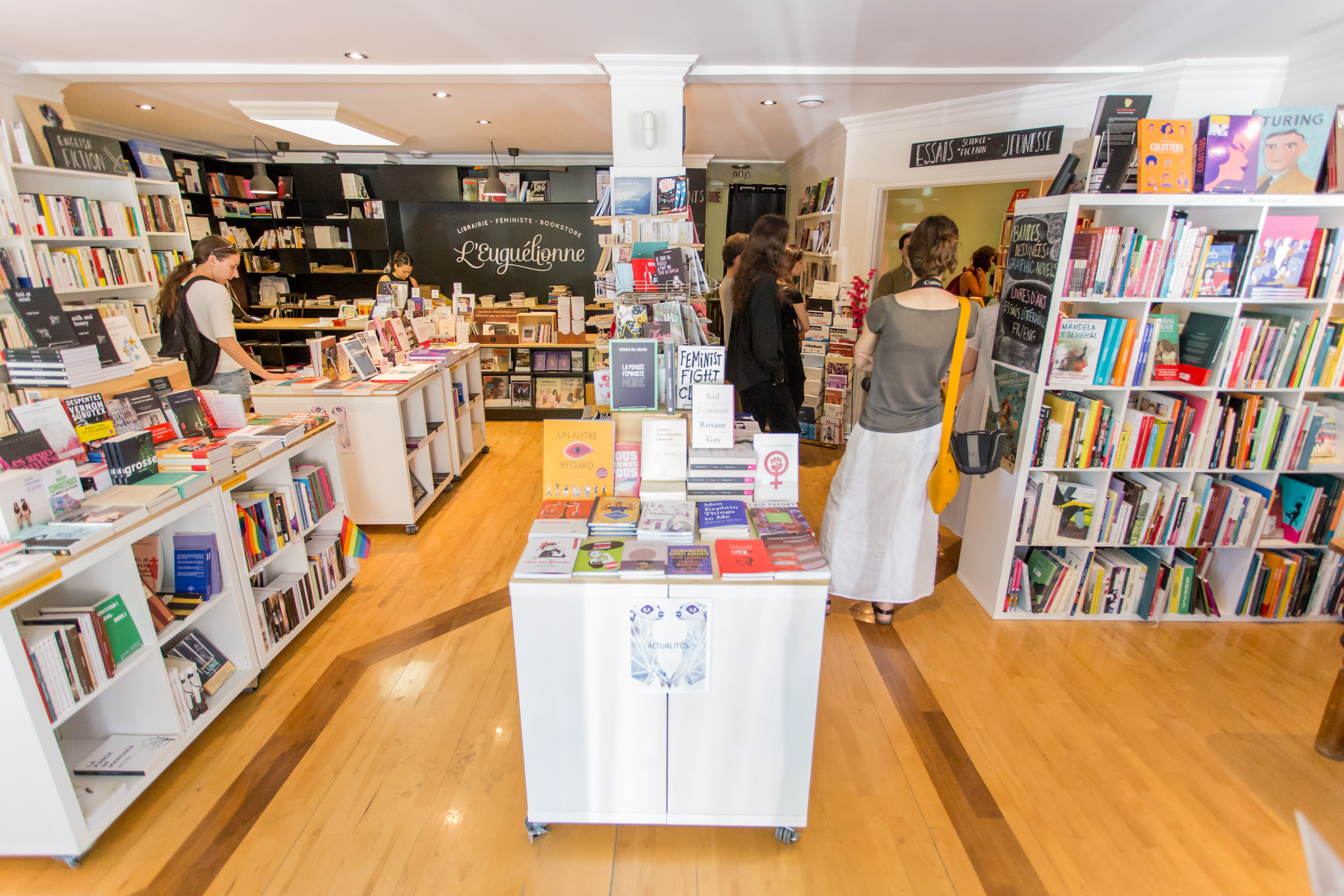
- Type: bookstore
- Headquarters: Montreal
- Website: librairieleuguelionne.com/en/

L'Euguélionne is a feminist and LGBTQ bookstore located on Beaudry street in the Montreal's gay village. It takes its name from the eponymous 1976 novel by Louky Bersianik.

== History ==
The bookstore had been in development since 2015 and opened to the public on 15 December 2016. Located on Beaudry street in the Montreal's gay village, it is the only feminist bookstore in Canada after the L'Androgyne bookstore closed in 2002. It takes its name from the eponymous feminist novel by Louky Bersianik, the pen name of Lucille Durand, published in 1976.

It was founded by a collective consisting of literature students, authors and booksellers–Marie-Ève Blais, Sandrine Bourget-Lapointe, Stéphanie Dufresne, Nicolas Longtin-Martel, Karine Rosso, and Camille Toffoli. The bookstore specializes in feminist and LGBTQ literature.

L'Euguélionne operates as a cooperative with "direct democracy and collegiality" amongst its rules. It follows a horizontal cooperative model, described as "guided by the desire to include the as many people as possible, and feminists from all walks of life". The collection of books at L'Euguélionne is carefully curated by its members.

In 2018, the cooperative had 2,750 members. The bookstore is accredited by the Government of Quebec to supply books to various institutions such as libraries and schools.
