= Doris Anderson =

Canadian author, journalist

Doris Hilda Anderson
- Born: November 10, 1921; Medicine Hat, Alberta, Canada
- Died: March 2, 2007 (aged 85); Toronto, Ontario, Canada
- Occupations: Author, journalist and women's rights activist

Doris Hilda Anderson, CC OOnt (November 10, 1921 – March 2, 2007) was a Canadian author, journalist and women's rights activist. She is best known as the editor of the women's magazine Chatelaine, mixing traditional content (recipes, décor) with thorny social issues of the day (violence against women, pay equality, abortion, race, poverty), putting the magazine on the front lines of the feminist movement in Canada. Her activism beyond the magazine helped drive social and political change, enshrining women's equality in the Canadian Constitution and making her one of the most well-known names in the women's movement in Canada.

== Personal life ==
Doris Anderson was born in Medicine Hat, Alberta as Hilda Doris Buck to Rebecca Laycock Buck and Thomas McCubbin. Mrs. Buck, whose first husband had abandoned her and her two young sons, leaving them in debt, met McCubbin when he was a guest at her mother's boarding house in Calgary. She was staying with her sisters in Medicine Hat when Anderson was born and briefly placed her "illegitimate" child in a home for unwanted babies in Calgary, reclaiming her several months later. (Note: There is contradictory information published about Anderson's place of birth and her surname at birth because of this series of events, notably in The Canadian Encyclopedia.) Buck and McCubbin married shortly before Anderson's eighth birthday.

Anderson described her father as difficult and domineering, rebuking her forward and unladylike demeanour. Her mother wanted Anderson to be demure, keep her head down and conform to "respectable" expectations, perhaps as a result of her experiences as a single mother bearing a child out of wedlock. Anderson chafed under the expectations of her parents that she marry and raise children and chose instead to forge an independent life.

Anderson attended Crescent Heights High School and went on to graduate from teacher's college in 1940. She used her teaching income to earn a Bachelor of Arts degree from the University of Alberta in 1945. (Note: This reference claims a 1925 birth year, contrary to other sources indicating 1921.)

Anderson married Prince Edward Island-born lawyer and Liberal Party organizer David Anderson in 1957. The pair had three sons: Peter (born 1958), Stephen (born 1961), and Mitchell (born 1963), before divorcing in 1972. Theirs was not a love match; she married because she wanted children.

When her employers discovered she was pregnant, they sent her to work at home. At the time, women were expected to resign from their employment when their pregnancies began to show. Anderson, however, worked until her due date, and returned to work almost immediately (there was no parental leave available).

== Career at Chatelaine ==
Upon receiving her degree, Anderson wrote and sold pieces of fiction and spent time in Europe before she returned to Canada and secured a job writing advertising copy for Chatelaine in 1951. By 1955, she'd worked her way up to associate editor. When John Clare, the editor, stepped down, and a new male editor was appointed, Anderson threatened to quit, and her publisher eventually relented and gave her the job instead.

Anderson held the position of editor of Chatelaine from 1957 to 1977. Her early tenure at the magazine saw it transformed from a traditional women's publication into one that addressed challenging issues of the day, including legal abortion in specific circumstances (1959), child abuse (1960), Canadian divorce laws (1961) and a call for equal pay for women (1962). The female writers she employed (June Callwood, Barbara Frum, Adrienne Clarkson, and Michele Landsberg) would go on to have successful careers as journalists.

In 1963, Anderson chose not to run an excerpt from a new ^{book}~~novel~~ in Chatelaine, feeling the material had already been well explored by the magazine. The book was Betty Friedan's The Feminine Mystique.

In 1969, she campaigned for, and did not receive, the editorship of Maclean's magazine, losing the job to Peter Gzowski despite her significantly longer tenure with the company and her track record of success. The job would have meant more than increased visibility in the publishing industry – it paid more than twice as much. The publisher said that she wouldn't have been able to represent the company publicly, but couldn't explain why.

Promoting the role of women in politics under her direction, Chatelaine identified 50 women who had potential as parliamentarians and put 12 of them - including Member of Parliament Flora MacDonald - on the cover. For much of her life, Anderson supported greater representation of women in Parliament.

She departed Chatelaine in 1977. In her two decades as editor, she'd tripled circulation of the magazine, and made it the most profitable of the Maclean-Hunter publications. By the late 1960s, one in every three women in Canada was reading the magazine.

In 2008, the magazine was recognized as the second-most influential magazine in Canada – just ahead of Maclean's.

== Post-Chatelaine career ==
In the 1978 by-election she ran unsuccessfully for the House of Commons of Canada as a Liberal in the Toronto riding of Eglinton, as the Liberals were swept from office in a wave of anti-Trudeau sentiment.

She was appointed chair of the Canadian Advisory Council on the Status of Women (CACSW) in 1979. She worked successfully for the inclusion of women's rights in the Canadian Constitution and the Canadian Charter of Rights and Freedoms (section 28), adding a single statement to the Charter indicating that men and women are equal under law. The specific wording reads: "Notwithstanding anything in the Charter, the rights and freedoms referred to in it are guaranteed to male and female persons." It was clear, Anderson said, "that the charter of rights could do good things for women or, if it was a bad charter, it could be a terrible problem for women for generations to come."

With CACSW, she commissioned research into issues such as the prevalence and prevention of domestic abuse and other violence against women.

Her frustration with the status quo was evident in a column published in Maclean's in 1980, where she wrote of wage inequality, domestic violence, and being ignored by politicians.

From 1982 to 1984, she was the president of the National Action Committee on the Status of Women, where she was known as a peacemaker within the movement. For almost a decade, beginning in 1984, she was a columnist for the Toronto Star (that ended when she refused to cross a picket line when Star writers were on strike). She was named a recipient of the Governor General's Awards in Commemoration of the Persons Case in 1991, and served as Chancellor of the University of Prince Edward Island from 1992 to 1996.

In 1994, Doris Anderson was invited to be an observer in the South African election that brought Nelson Mandela to power and ended apartheid, an opportunity her son Mitchell described as "one of the greatest thrills of his mother's life."

== Final years ==
Anderson was named the chair of the Ontario Press Council in 1998, and in 2001, the Doris Anderson Ontario Graduate Scholarship in Women's Studies was established at York University to recognize her contributions. She was promoted to Companion of the Order of Canada in 2002, the last public award she received during her lifetime.

Anderson's final years were marked by ill health, from heart failure in 2001 to numerous other health problems that developed after a 2006 visit to Costa Rica. In February 2007, she was admitted to St. Michael's Hospital in Toronto, where she died on March 2 at age 85 from pulmonary fibrosis.

== Legacy ==
Doris Anderson has been posthumously recognized for her contributions to Canadian society. In 2016, her accomplishments were recognized on a plaque by Heritage Toronto. In 2017, she was included in the She Who Dares project by the Calgary YWCA, which recognized women who impacted Calgary as part of Canada's sesquicentennial.

Anderson's autobiography, Rebel Daughter, was transformed into a play by students at the University of Toronto Mississauga and Sheridan College in 2014, which became the subject of a radio documentary entitled Daughters and Sons

Her impact on Canadian feminism was documented in a 2007 edition of Canadian Woman Studies, entitled Celebrating Doris Anderson.

In 1981 a grass-roots, feminist group opened an emergency shelter for women and children fleeing violence and named it Anderson House, after Doris Anderson. The shelter is still in operation today.

== Honours ==
Doris Anderson was widely recognized, and received many awards during her life:

- National honours: Canadian Centennial Medal (1967); Officer of the Order of Canada (1974); Governor General's Awards in Commemoration of the Persons Case (1991); Companion of the Order of Canada (2002)
- Honorary degrees: University of Alberta (1973); Conestoga College (1981); University of Dalhousie (1984); Ryerson Polytechnic University (1987); Concordia University (1990); University of Waterloo and Mount Saint Vincent University (1992); York University and Simon Fraser University (1997)
- Journalism awards: News Hall of Fame (1981); Mediawatch award (1990)
- Regional recognition: City of Toronto award (1981); Toronto YWCA Woman of Distinction award; University of Alberta Hall of Fame (1993); Distinguished Alumni Award, University of Alberta (1994); Member of the Order of Ontario (1995); Distinguished Alumni Award, Mount Royal College (1996)

== Selected works ==
- Rebel Daughter: An Autobiography (1996, ISBN 1-55013-767-0)
- The Unfinished Revolution: Status of Women in Twelve Countries (1991, ISBN 0-385-25271-4)
- Affairs of State (1988, 0-3852-5154-8)
- Rough Layout (1981, ISBN 0-7710-0742-6)
- Two Women (1978, ISBN 0-7705-1653-X)

== Archives ==
There is a Doris H. Anderson fonds at Library and Archives Canada. The archival reference number is R12700. The material covers the date ranges 1935 to 2007. It consists of 3.88 meters of textual records and 102 photographs : 70 b&w negatives; 21 b&w prints; 5 contact sheets; 6 col. prints.
