= Florence Bird =

Canadian politician

The Honourable Florence Bayard Bird CC

Canadian Senator from Ontario
- In office 1978–1983
- Appointed by: Pierre Trudeau

Personal details
- Born: Florence Bayard Rhein; January 15, 1908 Philadelphia, Pennsylvania, U.S.
- Died: July 18, 1998 (aged 90) Ottawa, Ontario, Canada
- Party: Liberal
- Education: Bryn Mawr College (BA)

Florence Bayard Bird, CC (January 15, 1908 – July 18, 1998) was a Canadian broadcaster, journalist, politician. She is best known for her work as chairwoman of Royal Commission on the Status of Women.

== Background ==
Born Florence Rhein in Philadelphia, Pennsylvania, she attended Bryn Mawr College and in 1928 married journalist John Bird. They moved to Montreal in 1931. In 1937, they moved to Winnipeg where her husband worked for the Winnipeg Tribune. She also appeared on CBC Radio and Television as Anne Francis, a political analyst. Francis [Bird] made several appearances on the panel show, Fighting Words in the early 1960s.

She is best remembered for her work as chair of the Royal Commission on the Status of Women.

She was a member of the Senate of Canada from March 23, 1978 until January 15, 1983.

In 1971, she was invested as a Companion of the Order of Canada. In 1983, she was named a recipient of the Governor General's Awards in Commemoration of the Persons Case. She was a member of the Junior League.

== Archives ==
There is a Florence Bird fonds at Library and Archives Canada.
