= Kaufman Footwear =

Canadian footwear manufacturing company

Kaufman Footwear was a Kitchener, Ontario-based shoe company. It was known for its Sorel brand.

== History ==
The Kaufman Rubber Company was founded by Jacob Kaufman and his son Alvin Ratz Kaufman in 1908, in Berlin, Ontario - what is now Kitchener, Ontario. It became Kaufman Footwear in 1964.

A.R. Kaufman took over as president of the company in 1920, a position he held until 1964, when his son, William H. Kaufman, assumed the role. A. R. Kaufman was a leading Canadian eugenicist who encouraged sterilization of his workers. When Kaufman Rubber laid off workers during the Great Depression, Kaufman's proposed solution to their financial woes was sterilization. Kaufman would later take credit for over 1000 male sterilizations performed at Kaufman factories between 1930 and 1969.

Kaufman Rubber Co. brands included Foamtread slippers, introduced in 1953; Showertogs, an early use of PVC as a clothing material, in 1954; and its Sorel line of winter boots, which was later developed as a utility and fashion winter footwear brand.

In 1961 Kaufman purchased L.H. Packard & Co. of Montreal, followed by Prospect Shoes Ltd. of Sherbrooke in 1966. Kaufman also manufactured under the brand names "Oomphies" (women's casual and duty shoes), "Snowbelles" (slush-molded vinyl boots), "Feelings" (women's casual sandals), "The Real Thing" (women's footbed sandals), "Kingtreads" (safety footwear) and "Black Diamond" (industrial footwear and clothing).

Kaufman Footwear declared bankruptcy in 2000 and the Sorel trademark was bought by Columbia Sportswear.
