= Batshaw =

Batshaw may refer to:

== Organizations ==
- Batshaw Youth and Family Centres, a youth protection centre

== People ==
- Harry Batshaw (1902–1984), Canadian lawyer and a justice of the Quebec Superior Court
- Manuel G. Batshaw (1915–2016), Canadian social worker
- Mark Batshaw (1945-), American pediatrician
