= Britannia Secondary School =

Britannia Community Secondary School

Location
- 1001 Cotton Drive; Vancouver, British Columbia, V5L 3T4; Canada; 49.276203°N 123.07145°W

Information
- School type: Public, high school
- Motto: Latin: Per Vias Rectas (Through The Right Way)
- Founded: 1908
- School board: School District 39 Vancouver
- Superintendent: Helen McGregor
- Area trustee: Lois Chan-Pedley
- School number: 03939004
- Principal: Sonia Blair
- Grades: 8-12
- Enrollment: 592 (2025/2026)
- Language: English
- Area: Grandview–Woodland
- Colours: Red, Green, and White
- Team name: Bruins
- Feeder schools: Britannia Community Elementary; Seymour Elementary; Strathcona Elementary; MacDonald Elementary; Lord Nelson Elementary; Grandview Elementary; Queen Victoria Annex
- Website: britannia.vsb.bc.ca
- Last updated: October 3, 2026

Britannia Community Secondary School is a public community secondary school located in the Grandview–Woodland neighbourhood on the east side of Vancouver, British Columbia. The school was founded in 1908 and is the oldest remaining secondary school in Vancouver.

Situated adjacent to Commercial Drive, the school is a part of the larger Britannia Community Centre complex which includes an elementary school, public library, skating rink, fitness facility and swimming pool. Nearly 200 courses are offered at the school, as well as several alternative programs including the International Baccalaureate (IB) Diploma Programme and a Hockey Canada Skills Academy.

Britannia athletic teams are known as the Bruins and compete in the Vancouver Secondary School Athletics Association as part of BC School Sports.

== History ==
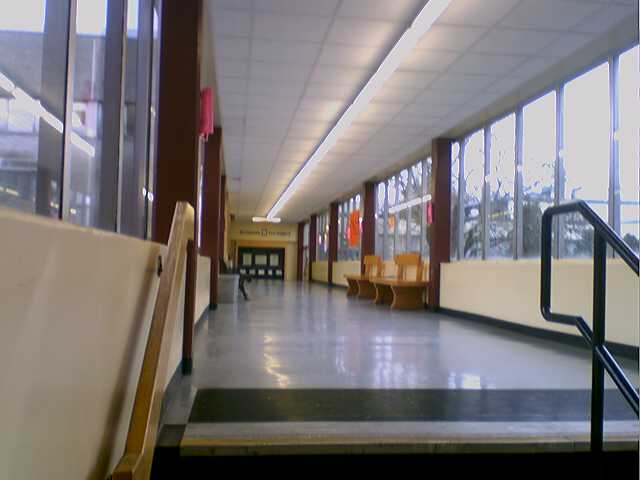
"The Skywalk", which connects the old building to the new building

Founded in 1908, Britannia is the oldest remaining secondary school in Vancouver. The first classes were held in the Admiral Seymour building in September 1908, and the school moved into the Britannia building in 1910. In September 1955, a gymnasium and cafeteria were opened, and the school began admitting students in grades 8 and 9.

In 1972, the school became Britannia Elementary-Secondary School, with the elementary section opening on January 9, 1975. The new addition brought 370 students, resulting in a total of approximately 1800 students. The same year, the school was designated a Community School and the Britannia Community Services Centre Society was incorporated.

Britannia celebrated its centennial in 2008. In June 2016, the Vancouver School Board (VSB) placed Britannia on a preliminary list of potential closures because of low enrolment. In September 2016, it was removed from the list after opposition from community groups. Mike Lombardi, chair of the VSB, cited the school's large number of vulnerable and Indigenous students as a factor: "We felt in the year of truth and reconciliation this was the year to build on what Britannia had been doing – not to close it down."

== Alternative programs ==
=== International Baccalaureate ===
Britannia offers an International Baccalaureate (IB) Diploma Programme for grades 11–12 and a Venture program for grades 8–10. Britannia and Sir Winston Churchill Secondary School are the only two public secondary schools in the Vancouver school district to offer the program, which offers some course content at the first-year university level.

=== Britannia Hockey Academy ===
The Britannia Hockey Academy was a low-barrier hockey program for grades 8–12. The first sport-focused academy in the school district, the program was a licensed Hockey Canada Skills Academy. In June 2026, the Vancouver School Board announced that the academy would be paused for the 2026–27 school year, citing low enrolment.

=== Other programs ===
The school also offers Streetfront, an alternative program for students with academic difficulties; Outreach, an alternative program for Indigenous students; and Venture, an advanced program for students in grades 8–10.

== Facilities ==
Britannia Secondary is notable for having community centre facilities within the complex. The school is situated on a 16-hectare (40-acre) site that includes an ice rink, swimming pool, several gyms, and a weight room and fitness centre. These facilities are used by students for physical education classes and extracurricular activities.

The Britannia Centre houses a branch of the Vancouver Public Library. The school also has a library for students on the third floor.

== Demographics ==
Britannia's catchment area includes the neighbourhoods of Strathcona, the Downtown Eastside, and most of Grandview–Woodland. In 2010, the school had a student body of 748 students in grades 8–12, with 28% of the students being Indigenous, while 4% were English-language learning (ELL) students and 2% were non-residents. In 2016, one third of Britannia's 577 students were Indigenous, the highest proportion of any school in Vancouver. In 2024, over 50% of students identified as Indigenous or Black. The school has a student population with at least 38 different languages spoken including Cantonese, Vietnamese, Mandarin and Tagalog.

Approximately 30% of Britannia students live in households that receive income assistance or have marginal cost of funds, and 26% of students were identified as having special needs. The Britannia graduation rate is 97%. In 2019, the school received a Fraser Institute rating of 4.5/10.

In 2024, Sonia Blair became the principal. The staff consists of 3 administrators, 53 full and part-time teachers and 26 support staff members. The school has an average class size of 22.9, which is lower than the district average class size of 24.8.

== Athletics ==

Provincial championships		Provincial runners-up	
Sport	Year(s)	Sport	Year(s)
Sr Football	1967 Tie	Sr Football	1970,1971
Girls AA volleyball	1969, 1970, 1971	Boys AA basketball	2009
Wrestling	1975, 1976; 1977, 1978	Girls AA basketball	2011
Boys table tennis	1982, 1983, 1984; 1985, 1988, 1989; 1991		
Girls table tennis	1982, 1988, 1989; 1990, 1991, 2015, 2017, 2019		
Junior boys ultimate friesbee	2006		
Boys AA basketball	2008, 2010		
Girls AA basketball	2012		

Britannia is predominately an AA school in terms of athletics according to the BC School Sports. The school had a dominant football team in the 1970s, winning the Shrine Bowl Provincial Championships once, and being runners-up three times. In 1974, Britannia hosted their first basketball tournament called the Bruin Invitational Basketball Tournament. Since then, the tournament is hosted annually and it has been a great success to Britannia.

On March 8, 2008, The Britannia Senior Boys Basketball team won the British Columbia AA Provincial Basketball Tournament by beating the Windsor Dukes 81-73. That was the first time any public school from East Vancouver has won a B.C. boys senior high basketball title. The next season, Britannia's senior boys team made the 'AA' Provincial final again, but lost to Southern Okanagan Secondary School from Oliver. The following 2010 basketball season saw the Britannia Senior Boys Basketball team return to the AA Provincial Basketball final and defeated the basketball team from RC Palmer Secondary to reclaim the title of AA Provincial Champion.

On March 10, 2012, the Britannia Senior Girls Basketball team also made school history by capturing its first B.C. girls basketball title after a silver medal finish the year before in 2011. Britannia's senior girls team beat Lambrick Park 69-61 in the AA Provincial basketball final after a fourth quarter surge that saw the Bruins outscore the Pride 21-4.

Britannia has teams for badminton, basketball, cross country, soccer, table tennis, track and field, ultimate frisbee, and volleyball.

== Notable alumni ==
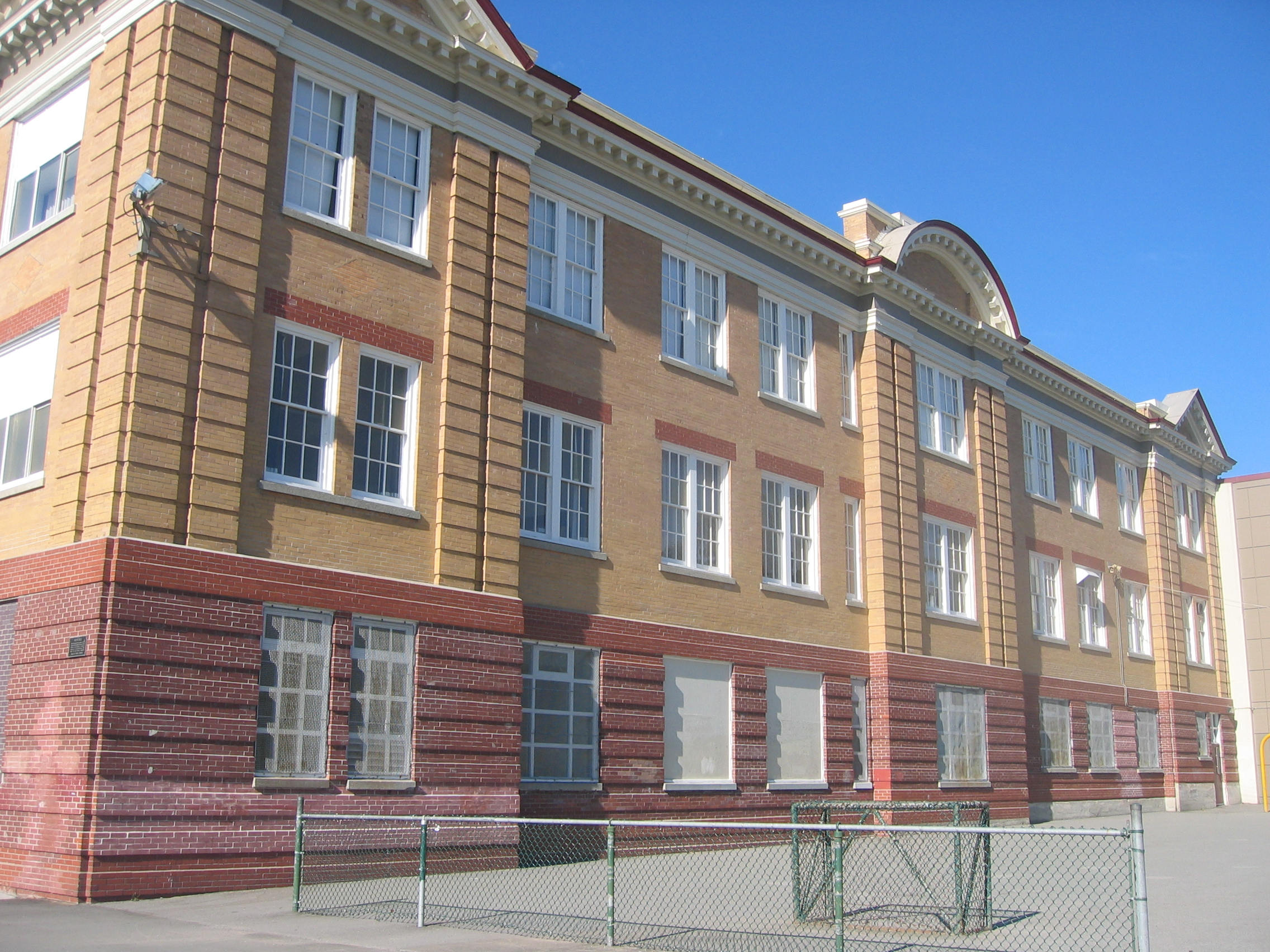
The south side of the school

Britannia has produced Premiers, Supreme Court Justices and philanthropists over its 102-year history. Notably, in the past three years, Britannia has produced two Loran Scholars (the largest undergraduate scholarship in Canada, at $80,000), one TD Canada Trust Scholarship recipient ($70,000), and over twenty Beedie Luminaries Scholars ($40,000), the most of any secondary school in Canada.

Year of Graduation	Name	Description
1930	Tong Louie	noted businessman for the establishment of London Drugs (a retail chain of stores) and philanthropist and Order of Canada recipient
1939	Barbara Howard	Track and field athlete, first black woman athlete to represent Canada in an International competition and the first person from a visible minority to be hired as a teacher by the Vancouver School Board.
1948	Dave Barrett	former Premier of British Columbia
1953	Frank Iacobucci	former Supreme Court of Canada Justice
1997	Amber Hall	former Women's National Basketball Association player.
1971	Barry Houlihan	former BC Lions player
unknown	Angelo Branca	former Supreme Court of British Columbia and Court of Appeals of British Columbia judge
