= Gida =

Gida or GIDA may refer to:

- Gida, Rajasthan, a village and tehsil headquarters
- Goshree Islands Development Authority, Kochi, Kerala, India
- Global Inclusion & Diversity Alliance, an alliance formed by the Canadian Centre for Diversity and Inclusion, Diversity Council Australia, and other organizations

== See also ==
- Alexandria, Greece, previously known as Gidas
