= Muriel Kovitz =

Canadian university chancellor (1926–2021)

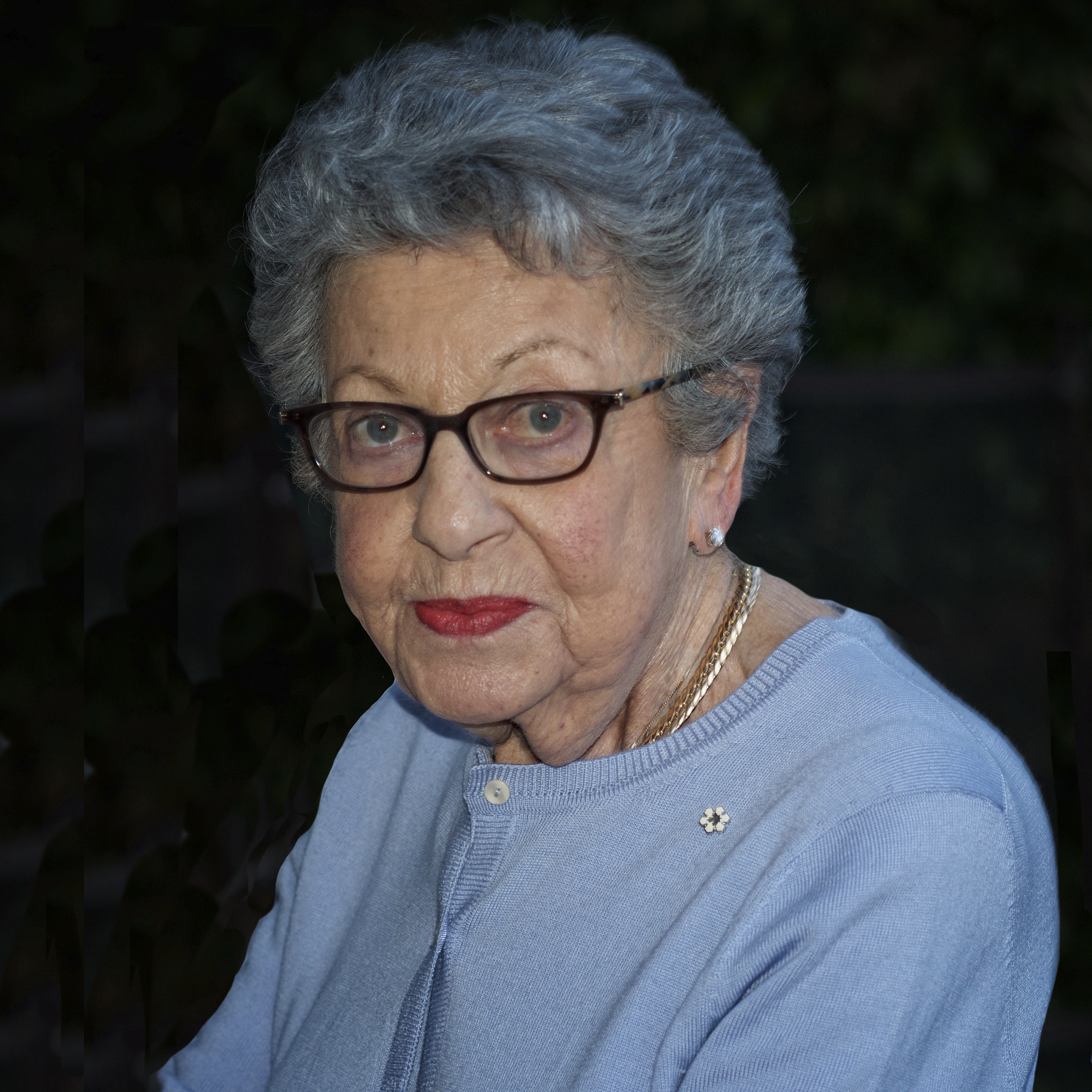

Chancellor of the University of Calgary
- In office 1974–1978
- Preceded by: Louis Lebel
- Succeeded by: James S. Palmer

Personal details
- Born: February 20, 1926 Calgary, Alberta, Canada
- Died: May 30, 2021 (aged 95) Vancouver, British Columbia, Canada
- Spouse: David M. Kovitz (m.1945) (d.1992)
- Children: Jeffrey Wayne, Ronald Stephen, Ethel Rose
- Education: University of Toronto; Royal Academy of Music
- Occupation: University chancellor, community leader, corporate director
- Awards: Member of the Order of Canada (1977), Alberta Achievement Award (1977)

Muriel Kovitz C.M. LL.D LRSM (née Libin; February 20, 1926 – May 30, 2021) was a Canadian academic leader, corporate director, and community volunteer. She served as the Chancellor of the University of Calgary in Alberta from 1974 until 1978. She was the first female and first Jewish person to hold the position. Other involvement at the University of Calgary included a member of the Senate (1970) and Chairman of the Senate Executive Committee, a member of the Board of Governors (1972) and a member of the Board of Governors Executive Committee, all prior to being elected as Chancellor. She is a Chancellor Emeritus of the University of Calgary. She was appointed a Member of the Order of Canada in 1977 for her contributions to education and public service.

== Early life and education ==
Muriel Libin was born in Calgary, Alberta, on February 20, 1926. She was the daughter of Norman and Ethel Libin, part of a prominent Jewish family in Calgary. She earned her Licentiate of the Royal Schools of Music (LRSM) in piano performance from the Royal Academy of Music in 1944 and later pursued further education at the University of Toronto.

== Personal life ==
In 1945, she married Dr. David M. Kovitz, a Calgary dentist. They had three children: Jeffrey, Ronald, and Ethel. Dr. Kovitz died in 1992. Muriel later moved to Vancouver, British Columbia, where she died peacefully on May 30, 2021, at the age of 95.

== University of Calgary ==
Kovitz began her formal association with the University of Calgary in 1970 as a member of the Senate. She went on to chair its Executive Committee and, in 1972, was appointed to the university’s Board of Governors.

In 1974, she became Chancellor, serving until 1978. She was both the first woman and the first Jewish Canadian to hold the position. She was later granted the title Chancellor Emerita in recognition of her contributions.

In 1979, Kovitz and her husband donated the University’s ceremonial mace, used in all convocation ceremonies. That same year, she established the Muriel Kovitz Prize, awarded annually to the graduating undergraduate student with the highest GPA. The University of Calgary Mace was donated by Muriel and David Kovitz in 1979.

== Corporate and national service ==
Kovitz was the first woman appointed to the board of directors of Imperial Oil in 1975. She later chaired the company’s charitable foundation when it was created in 1994.

She also held board positions with the Reader’s Digest Association of Canada Ltd., the Institute of Donations and Public Affairs Research, Alberta Investments Ltd., and Centennial Packers of Canada Ltd, and Murko Investments Ltd.

In 1979, she was appointed by Prime Minister Pierre Trudeau as a Commissioner on the Task Force on Canadian Unity.

== Community involvement ==
Kovitz was active in numerous civic organizations. She served as President of the Calgary Section (1959–1961) and on the National Executive Committee (1961–1973) of the National Council of Jewish Women of Canada.

She was involved with the Calgary Social Planning Council, Calgary Housing Authority, Vecova (formerly VRRI), the Canadian Council of Christians and Jews, and co-chaired the Third International Banff Conference on Man and His Environment in 1978.

Additional roles include:

- National Chairman of the School for Citizen Participation (1967 –1973)
- Member of the Calgary Recreation Board (1966–1969)
- President of the Calgary Social Planning Council (1967–1969)
- Member of the Board of Vocational & Rehabilitation Research Institute of Calgary now known as Vecova (1968–1969)
- Member of the Calgary Housing Authority (1968–1972)
- Member of Canadian Medical Association's working group on Ethics in Human Experimentation
- Member of the Alberta Rhodes Scholarship Selection Committee (1976)

After relocating to British Columbia, she served on the boards of the Victoria Foundation, the Greater Victoria Hospital Foundation, the Boys and Girls Club, and helped establish Arts Sustainability Victoria.

== Honours ==
In 1977, Muriel Kovitz was appointed a Member of the Order of Canada for “service to the National Council of Jewish Women, and to numerous other voluntary and educational organizations, and to the University of Calgary.”

She also received the Alberta Achievement Award in the same year. In 1981, the University of Calgary awarded her an honorary Doctor of Laws degree (LL.D.) for her contributions to the university and broader society.
