= Mascoll =

Mascoll is a surname. Notable people with the surname include:

- Beverly Mascoll, Canadian businesswoman
- Clyde Mascoll, Barbadian politician
- Jamie Mascoll (born 1997), English footballer
- Joel Mascoll (born 1974), Saint Vincent and the Grenadines sprinter

== See also ==
- Noah Mascoll-Gomes (born 1999), Antigua and Barbuda swimmer
