= Luc-André Godbout =

Canadian anti-poverty activist (1933–2004)

Luc-André Godbout (1933–2004) nicknamed Ti-Dré and le ramoneur des pauvres ("the poor people's chimney sweep"), was an anti-poverty activist in Quebec City. He was one of the Duplessis Orphans and was improperly held in psychiatric facilities until the age of 22. He was known for sweeping chimneys, and helping low income residents. In the 1970s and 1980s, he organized protest marches on behalf of poor people. He declined an appointment to the Order of Canada. In 1976, he was the subject of a National Film Board of Canada film Ti-Dre. In 2009, the Saint-Sauveur Neighbourhood in Quebec City named a house where he had lived, the Maison Luc-André-Godbout.

== Early life ==
Luc-Andre Godbout was born in 1933 during the great depression. He was found in a cardboard box in a parking lot as an infant and spent his first months at the Crèche Saint-Vincent-de-Paul, an orphanage for young children in Quebec City. He was moved to a mental institution in Baie-Saint-Paul for the next 20 years. At the age of 11, Godbout worked at the institution working various chores including cleaning toilets and washing floors. In a 1981 interview with Le Soleil, he said that he had been physically abused and placed in solitary confinement during his time at the institution and when he asked to be taught to read and write, he was abused further; he described himself as illiterate. At 22, he left the mental institution and was legally adopted; his last name was changed from Martel to Godbout.

== Activism ==
Godbout credits his decision to help poor households to a fatal fire in 1957 caused by an oil burner that had not been repaired. From then on, he lived off of social assistance and worked for free. Pulling a handcart through Quebec City's Lower Town, Godbout swept chimneys, repaired oil-fired space heaters and helped people move for free. He later said that he began the work as charity and gradually came to see it as political.

During the 1970s and 1980s, Godbout organized marches and fasts. Including a walk from Quebec City to Ottawa to ask politicians to help the poor. In the summer of 1975 he walked about 600 miles (970 km) over a period of six weeks from Sainte-Felicite to Mirabel. He had recently turned down the Order of Canada and was giving interviews while also meeting with farmers and unions.

In June 1981, Godbout prepared to set out from the United States consulate in Quebec City on a walk to Ottawa. He had planned to walk to the United Nations in New York City, but did not have enough money at the time to pay for the border crossing and walked to Ottawa instead. His march was to raise awareness and stand in solidarity with the people of El Salvador, to denounce factory closures, and to raise awareness about the impact of acid rain.

In 1974, he was nominated for the Order of Canada but refused to accept it saying that "I refuse this decoration because it would be dishonest to receive something which would have been decided by people who don't know the problems of cold, hunger, and who have never known what it is to be poor."

Godbout criticized the excesses of capitalism and government decisions which did not address the issues facing poor people. He was a supporter of the Quebec sovereignty movement.

== Death ==
Godbout died September 2, 2004.
