= Mary Jo Leddy =

Canadian writer, theologian and activist

Mary Jo Leddy, CM (born 1 February 1946) is a Canadian writer, speaker, theologian and social activist.

Leddy is widely recognized for her work with refugees at Toronto's Romero House. In 1973, she was the founding editor of the Catholic New Times. She is the author of the books Say to the Darkness We Beg to Differ (Lester and Orpen Denys, finalist City of Toronto Book Award), Reweaving Religious Life: Beyond the Liberal Model (Twenty Third Publications, 1990), At the Border Called Hope: Where Refugees are Neighbours (HarperCollins, 1997), finalist for the Trillium Award, Radical Gratitude (Orbis Books, 2002), Our Friendly Local Terrorist (Between the Lines, 2010), The Other Face of God: When the Stranger Calls Us Home (Orbis, 2011) and Why Are We Here? A Meditation on Canada (Novalis, 2019).

Leddy was the recipient of a Ph.D. in philosophy from the University of Toronto with a thesis titled "The Event of the Holocaust and the Philosophical Reflections of Hannah Arendt." She studied under the direction of Emil Fackenheim, and she is currently a Senior Fellow at Massey College, University of Toronto, and a board member of PEN Canada and Massey College. After some years as a member of the Roman Catholic Sisters of Our Lady of Sion, she began working for a welcome house for refugees in 1991. This house then became the Romero House community and she became its director until 2010. She continues to live and work at Romero House.

Leddy received the Human Relations Award of the Canadian Council of Christians and Jews (1987), the Ontario Citizenship Award (1993), and the Order of Canada (1996).

She has received several honorary doctorates:

- D.Litt. - York University (1993)
- D.Litt. - Mount Saint Vincent (1994)
- LL.D - Windsor (1990)
- LL.D. - Waterloo (1995)
- DD - St. Andrew's
- D.M. - Catholic Theological Union, Chicago (2008)
- Honorary Fellow, University of St. Michael's College (2015)
- DD - Atlantic School of Theology (2016)
- DD Misericordia University, PA (2018)
- (DD) Emmanuel College/Victoria University/U of Toronto (2019)
