= Amber Hall =

Amber Hall may refer to:

- Amber Hall (basketball)
- Amber Hall (rugby league)
