= Joseph J. Barnicke =

Canadian businessman

- Born: Joseph John Barnicke; April 6, 1923; Cudworth, Saskatchewan, Canada
- Died: May 19, 2015 (aged 92)
- Occupations: Businessman; entrepreneur; philanthropist
- Awards: Order of Canada (1989); Order of Ontario (2003); Order of St. Gregory the Great

Joseph John Barnicke, CM OOnt (April 6, 1923 – May 19, 2015) was a Canadian entrepreneur. He is best known for establishing J.J. Barnicke Limited, a real estate firm, in 1959.

== Career ==
Born in Cudworth, Saskatchewan, he attended public and high school in Oakville, Ontario. He was a Flying Officer with the Royal Canadian Air Force during World War II. From 1947 to 1957, he was a sales manager with O'Keefe Brewing Company. From 1957 to 1959, he was Vice President of Gibson Brothers. In 1959, he founded J.J. Barnicke Limited, growing it in time to become the largest independent real estate company in Canada. At the age of 84, in 2007 he sold the company to DTZ Holdings for nearly $27 million. He stayed on as chairman at DTZ Barnicke Ltd. and only stopped working in his final year.

== Philanthropic activities ==
Barnicke is known for both his business and philanthropic activities, having served as an Ontario campaign chair and a national campaign chair for the Canadian Cancer Society and donated a wing to St. Joseph's Health Centre in Toronto in his wife's name, Justina M. Barnicke. He also was the prime donor of the Justina M. Barnicke Gallery in Hart House at the University of Toronto. He was a Director of the Canadian Council of Christians and Jews and Chairman of St. Joseph's Health Centre Foundation. He was also one of the organizers of Pope John Paul II's 1984 visit to Toronto.

In 1955 when the first Grey Cup was held in Vancouver, the Junior Board of Trade of Toronto convinced the two Canadian Railways to pool a 13-car goodwill train, which stopped at every city that had a team in Canadian football. Both Barnicke and the late Fred Gardiner, the Chair of Metro Toronto, were the two co-goodwill ambassadors during the trip.

== Honours ==
Barnicke has received various honours. In 1989, he was invested as a Member of the Order of Canada. In 2003, he received the Order of Ontario; Knight Grand Cross with Star of the Order of St. Gregory the Great; Honorary Degree of Doctor of Laws from the University of Toronto; Honorary Degree of Doctor of Sacred Letters from the University of St. Michael's College; Honorary Degree of Doctor of Laws from Assumption University; an Award of Merit from the City of Toronto in 1985; and the Human Relations Award from the Canadian Council of Christians and Jews in 1986.
