= Catherine Hunter =

Catherine Hunter or Katherine Hunter may refer to:

- Catherine Hunter (filmmaker) (born 1960), Australian filmmaker
- Catherine Hunter (poet), Canadian poet
- Catherine Hunter, CEO of Diversity Council Australia (appointed 2025)
- Kaki Hunter (born Katherine Susan Hunter), American actress, architect, and writer
- Kathryn Hunter, English actress
- Kit Hunter, Katherine "Kit" Hunter, fictional character from Home and Away

== See also ==
- Hunter (surname)
