= Lucien Larré =

Canadian Catholic priest (1932–2026)

Lucien Larre (14 September 1932 – 8 February 2026) was a Canadian Roman Catholic priest with a doctorate in clinical psychology. He was the founder of Bosco Homes, a Saskatchewan-based organization operating homes for troubled youth, and created the Big Valley Jamboree music festival as a fundraiser for Bosco Homes.

== Abuse scandal ==
In 1992, Larre was convicted in Saskatchewan of physically abusing children in his care. He was acquitted on 9 of 11 charges, and obtained a pardon in 1997 and did not have a criminal record.

== Dr. Larre v. College of Psychologists of BC ==
In June 2006 the Inquiry Committee of the College of Psychologists of British Columbia commenced an investigation into Larre concerning his fitness and competence to practice psychology. The college appointed an American psychologist as an assessor. In September this psychologist submitted a report recommending that Larre cease to practice as a psychologist. In November the college approved the recommendation and invited Larre to resign from the college or to consent to the cancellation of his registration with the college. Larre refused to resign or to consent to the cancellation of his registration. On 20 November 2006, the Inquiry Committee suspended Larre's registration, noting "that there are serious public protection concerns and an immediate risk to the public".

Larre appealed his suspension to the Supreme Court of British Columbia. On 16 February 2007, the court dismissed the appeal.

== Honours ==
In 1983 Larre was named a member of the Order of Canada. In July 2008, he indicated his intention to resign his membership in the Order of Canada in protest of the appointment to the order of Henry Morgentaler. His resignation was accepted in January 2010.

Larre was the recipient of the Good Servant Award from the Canadian Council of Christians and Jews and of the William Kurelek Award from the (Canadian) Alliance for Life.

== Death ==
Larré died on 8 February 2026, at the age of 93.
