= List of Order of Canada insignia displayed in museums =

Insignia of the Order of Canada are often donated or loaned to museums to be included in their displays about important Canadians. Below is a list of known locations where these medals are displayed.

== Alberta ==
=== Calgary ===
Museum	Person	Rank	Notes
Glenbow Museum	Eric Harvie	Member, Officer	

== Manitoba ==
=== Winnipeg ===
Museum	Person	Rank	Notes
Canadian Museum for Human Rights	John Peters Humphrey	Officer	Museum is currently under construction. Medal image currently forms part of the Museum's digital collection

== Ontario ==
=== Kitchener, Ontario ===
Museum	Person	Rank	Notes
Waterloo Regional Museum	Henrietta McGarry	Commander	Medal donated to Hall of Fame Collection for periodic display

=== London, Ontario ===
Museum	Person	Rank	Notes
Royal Canadian Regiment Museum	Milton Fowler Gregg	Officer	Medal is a replacement. Original was stolen along with Gregg's Victoria Cross
Royal Canadian Regiment Museum	Thomas Eric D'Oyly Snow	Member	Displayed mounted with Snow's OBE
Royal Canadian Regiment Museum	Charles Foulkes	Companion	

=== Ottawa, Ontario ===
Museum	Person	Rank	Notes
Laurier House	Lester B. Pearson	Companion	Displayed with Pearson's Order of Merit
Rideau Hall	Oscar Peterson	Companion	As of 2011 Peterson's CC is kept in a display case in the ball room and displayed to visitors to the house.

=== St. Mary's, Ontario ===
Museum	Person	Rank	Notes
St. Mary's Museum	Dr. Shirley Thomson	Officer, Companion	Donated following her death in August 2010

=== Toronto, Ontario ===
Museum	Person	Rank	Notes
Hockey Hall of Fame	Wayne Gretzky	Officer	

=== Trenton, Ontario ===
Leonard Birchall

== Quebec ==
=== Laval ===
Museum	Person	Rank	Notes
Musee Armand Frappier	Armand Frappier	Companion	

=== Gatineau ===
Museum	Person	Rank	Notes
Canadian Museum of Civilization	Lotta Hitschmanova	Companion	Contained in the "Face to Face: The Canadian Personalities Hall" permanent exhibit

=== Quebec City ===
Museum	Person	Rank	Notes
Royal 22^{e} Régiment Museum (Citadelle of Quebec)	Jean Victor Allard	Companion	Displayed alongside Allard's other medals
Royal 22^{e} Régiment Museum (Citadelle of Quebec)	Pauline Vanier	Companion	
