= Wilson A. Head =

American-Canadian social worker and sociologist (1914–1993)

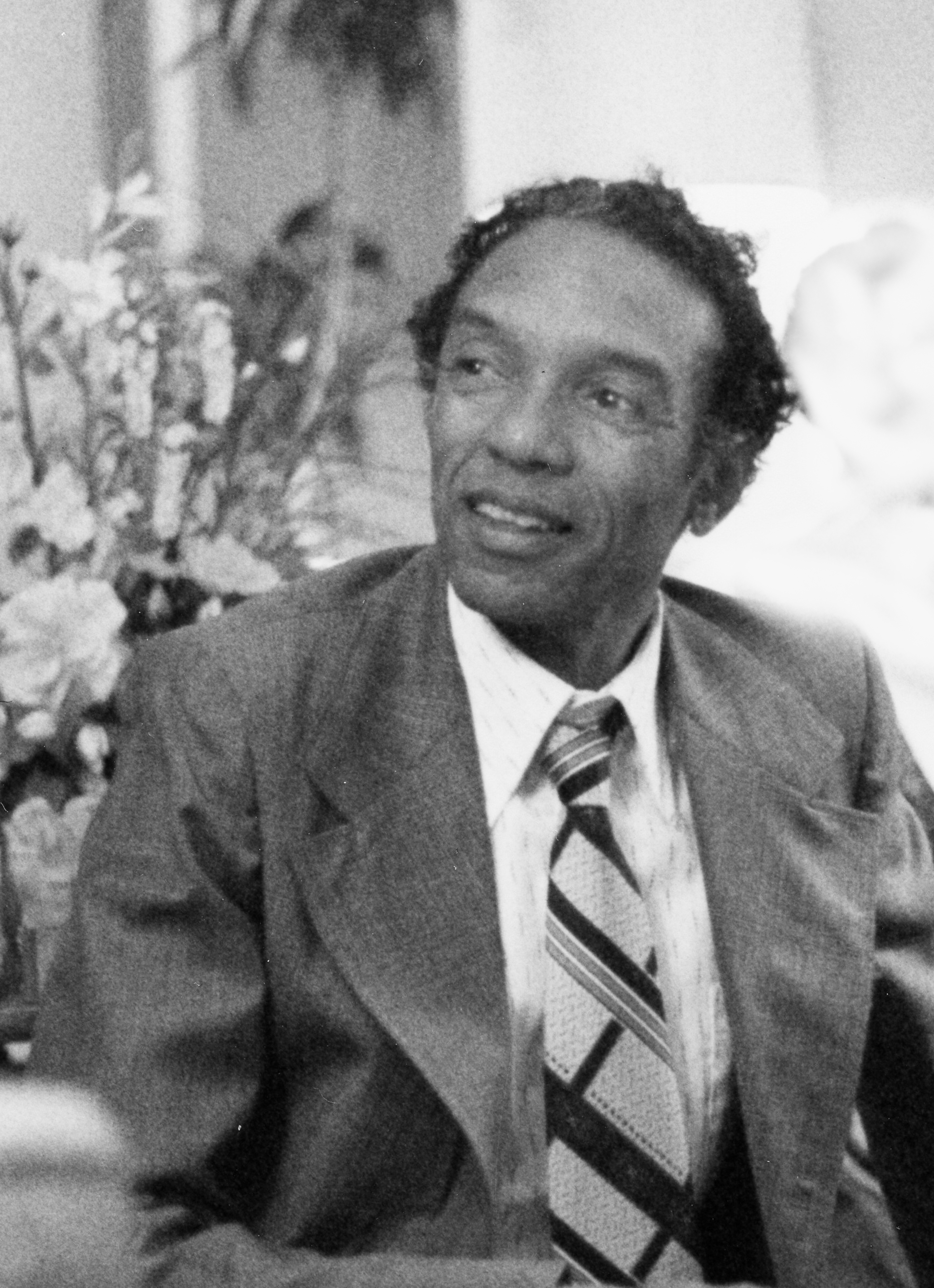
- Born: September 30, 1914; Milner, Georgia, United States
- Died: October 7, 1993 (aged 79); Toronto, Ontario, Canada
- Resting place: Knox United Church; Toronto, Ontario; Canada
- Education: Tuskegee Institute (B.Sc.Ed. 1940); University of Georgia (MSW 1942); Ohio State University (Ph.D. 1958)
- Occupations: Sociologist; professor; activist
- Spouses: Phyllis Drescher (1947–1972); Sandy Chapman (1972–1993)
- Children: 4

Wilson A. Head (September 30, 1914 – October 7, 1993) was an American and Canadian sociologist and community planner known for his work in race relations, human rights and peace in the United States, Canada and other parts of the world.

== Early life ==
Wilson Adonijah Head was born on September 30, 1914, in Milner, Georgia. He "was the son of a Georgia sharecropper, Evander Head (1892–1925), and of Evelyn Whittle (1898–1981), the eldest of five children"; siblings Frank, Marvin, Glenn, and Minnie Head. He was of African American, Northern European, and Cherokee descent. He grew up in deep poverty in the small black community of Milner, near Atlanta. His father died when he was 11, but his mother stressed the importance of education, telling him he would have to be "twice as smart as whites to compete". "He was once fired from a job for glancing at a newspaper. His boss didn't think blacks should know how to read. His mother took in laundry but when Head delivered it to her white customers, white boys would throw bricks at him or jump him." Wilson worked to put himself through school, graduating from Booker T. Washington High School in 1933 and, after taking two years to work and save the fees, graduated from Tuskegee Institute, Tuskegee, Alabama, in 1940 with a Bachelor of Science in education, by which time he had been named in Who's Who Among Students in American Universities and Colleges, 1939–40. In his memoirs, A Life on the Edge: Experiences in Black and White in North America, Head describes the poverty and injustices to which Black people in the "Deep South" were subjected, and which he experienced in his youth.

== Biography ==
In the 1930s, Head took part in a series of "sit-ins" on restaurants and bars, and protested against barbers, shopkeepers, and movie house owners who would not serve blacks a decade before the civil rights movement began. He also helped to desegregate a golf course in Windsor.

He worked at times with the Congress of Racial Equality (CORE) and the National Association for the Advancement of Colored People (NAACP). From 1943 to 1948, he was director of community development and community organization at Flanner House in Indianapolis, which served poor and indigent Black people. "In 1981, then president of the National Black Coalition of Canada, he testified before the Joint House Senate Committee on the Canadian Constitution". He was on the executive of The Metro Committee on Race Relations and Policing.

Head moved to Windsor, Canada in 1959 "to get my children away from a racist society". In the US, he had been director of Chicago's Parkway Community House, and director of the State of Ohio's Juvenile Diagnostic Centre. When he came to Canada in 1959, he was the executive director of the Windsor Group Therapy Project. In 1965 he became the Director of Research and Planning for the Social Planning Council of Metropolitan Toronto.

"He lectured in Social Work at the University of Windsor, 1960–1964, University of Michigan, 1962–1964, Wayne State University, 1963–1965 and Sir Williams College, Chicago, 1961–1964. He was involved with a number of organizations including the Canadian Civil Liberties Association of Toronto as Vice-President in 1967, The National Welfare Council founding member and National Black Coalition of Canada as Chairman and President from 1977 to 1982. Head became the first chairman of the Bachelor of Social Work Program at Atkinson College, York University".

In 1988, Head was asked to participate in the Donald Marshall Inquiry Commission in Nova Scotia. This investigation led to his paper Discrimination Against Blacks in Nova Scotia: The Criminal Justice System.

== Assault ==
On June 26, 1980, Head was assaulted while climbing the steps to the offices of U.A.R.R (Urban Alliance on Race Relations), College Street at Spadina Avenue, Toronto. He was attacked from behind with several blows to the head, resulting in a fall down the stairs. It took the police over 40 minutes to arrive at the scene after being called. The identity of his white assailant was never discovered.

== Ideology ==
Head was raised in the Baptist Church, but became a member of the Quakers (Society of Friends) in the 1940s. The Quakers supported him in his own convictions of pacifism, egalitarianism, and conscientious objection to military service. He was seen as a "moderate" in his views on combating racism, although he was notably the first to put racism on the agenda of the Canadian conscience. His "quiet, reasonable style became his hallmark". He opposed segregation of the races all his life. "He denounced the idea of all-black schools and social services, asserting, 'segregation is inherently inferior'". In his role as executive of the Metro Committee on Race Relations and Policing in Toronto, he was an "outspoken critic of Metro police", citing racial profiling in their practices. Head fought fiercely against poverty in Canada. He strove for peace and disarmament as Chairman of the Toronto Chapter, "World Conference on Religion and Peace", 1978–1984, member of "Science for Peace: Operation Dismantle", member of "Social Workers for Peace and Disarmament", on the steering committee for "Disarmament and Peace Movements", and member of "Toronto Disarmament Network" "If the bomb falls, race relations will not matter; we will all be dead." He also advocated for the abolition of prisons.

== Death ==
Head died of cancer of the prostate at Mount Sinai Hospital, Toronto, Ontario on October 7, 1993.

== See also ==
- List of peace activists

== Legacies ==
- Founding chairman, Urban Alliance on Race Relations (U.A.R.R), Toronto, Ontario, still today a strong advocacy voice.
- Co-author of The Ontario Human Rights Code, 1962.
- Founded and was the first president of the National Black Coalition of Canada, 1978, which dissolved in 1982, because, he said, "blacks were too busy fighting blacks".
- Autobiography, Life on the Edge: Experiences in "Black and White" in North America, by Wilson A. Head, 1993. Foreword by the late Honourable Lincoln Alexander, and an epilogue by Madame Rosalie Silberman Abella.
- Founding Chairperson of the School of Social Work, York University, Toronto, Ontario, 1966.
- A scholarship in Head's name has been set up at York University for students who demonstrate a particular interest in human rights, race relations and/or peace.
- "Who Gets the Work: A test of racial discrimination in employment", researchers F. Henry and E. Ginzberg, and "No Discrimination Here", Toronto Employers and the Multi-Racial Work Force", researchers B. Billingsley and L. Muszynski, joint publications by UARR and the Social Planning Council of Metro Toronto, 1985. These two research studies led to equal opportunity employment (EOE) law that is now the accepted practice in Canada today.

== Education ==
- Booker T. Washington High School, Atlanta, Georgia, 1933.
- Tuskegee Institute, Tuskegee, Alabama, Bachelor of Science in education with a major in sociology, 1940.
- University of Georgia, Master's degree in Social Work, 1942.
- Ohio State University, PhD in sociology, Adult Education, and Social Psychology, 1958.

== Honors and awards ==
Head received countless honors and awards in his lifetime, among which are:

- Named in Who's Who in Black Canada 2: Black Success and Black Excellence in Canada: A Contemporary Directory.
- Harry Jerome Award, 1988 for community service.
- Honorary Doctor of Laws degree, York University, Toronto, Ontario, 1982.
- Memorial Award for Outstanding Work in Antiracism, Peace and Human Rights, Atkinson College, York University, Toronto, Ontario.
- Toronto Onyx Lions Club – "A Tribute to Dr. Wilson Head", November 1989.
- Alpha Kappa Mu, a national honor society, 1940.
- Abdu'l-Bahá Race Unity Award, "Ye are the fruits of one tree and the leaves of one branch", 1982.
- Outstanding Achievement for Voluntarism, from the Minister of Culture and Communication, Ontario, 1989.
- The Commemorative Medal for the Anniversary of Confederation (1992), approved by Her Majesty The Queen, honours Canadians who have made a significant contribution to their fellow citizens, to their community or to Canada.
- The Good Servant Medal, The Canadian Council of Christians and Jews, 1987.
- Urban Alliance on Race Relations award, 1986.
- Presentation to Dr. Wilson Head in recognition of his Lifelong Contributions to Race Relations and World Peace Efforts, 1993 by Elaine Zembia, Minister of Citizenship.

== Works ==
Head authored and coauthored numerous research studies and articles, the more notable of which are:

- (1969) Poverty: A Major Issue Confronting Canadians
- (1975) The Black Presence in the Canadian Mosaic
- (1980) Adaptation of Immigrants in Metro Toronto: Perceptions of Ethnic and Racial Discrimination : an exploratory study
- (1989) Discrimination Against Blacks in Nova Scotia: The Criminal Justice System

== Books ==
- Head, Wilson (1995). A Life on the Edge: Experiences in Black and White in North America. University of Toronto Press. ISBN 978-0-9680066-0-3.
