= Beverly Mascoll =

Canadian businesswoman

- Born: Beverly Ashe; October 29, 1941; Fall River, Nova Scotia
- Died: May 16, 2001 (aged 59)
- Resting place: Mount Pleasant Cemetery, Toronto
- Known for: Incorporating her own beauty company, Mascoll Beauty Supply Ltd.

Beverly Mascoll (born Beverly Ashe, 1941-2001) was a Canadian businesswoman, fundraiser, community leader, and Member of the Order of Canada.

== Early life and career ==
Beverly Ashe was born on October 29, 1941, in Fall River, Nova Scotia, to parents Arthur and Gwendolyn Ashe. The Ashe family moved to Toronto in the early 1950s, when Beverly was a teenager.

After completing high school, Beverly Ashe worked as a receptionist at Toronto Barber and Beauty Supply. Within six months she was working as an assistant to the company's president. During this time she quickly noticed a business niche that needed to be filled - black hair-care products were scarce.

== Mascoll Beauty Supply Ltd. ==
Beverly Mascoll incorporated her own company, Mascoll Beauty Supply Ltd. in 1970, with only $700. She began selling products out of her truck and home, before flying to Chicago to convince U.S. manufacturer Johnson Products (at the time the largest manufacturer of beauty products) to grant her the rights to be the company's first and only Canadian distributor.

By 1971, Mascoll Beauty Supply was the leading distributor of black beauty products in Canada, and went on to become a major player in the beauty supply industry.

In addition to a chain of retail outlets, the company also manufactured and distributed products across the country. By the 1980s the business had expanded to include beauty demonstrations, conferences and professional hair care seminars. In 1984 Mascoll held the first ever Black beauty products trade show in Canada.

By 1998, Mascoll's company carried 3,000 beauty care products, and operated a chain of retail outlets. These retail outlets were a hub for many new Black-Canadian immigrants. The stores were a validation of their identity in a new country.

== Education and community activism ==
Community activism ran parallel to Mascoll's business endeavors. She was involved with several community organizations including the Harry Jerome Scholarship Fund (awarding excellence to Black-Canadian achievers), Camp Jumoke (a camp for children with Sickle Cell Anemia) and the Ontario Black History Society. Mascoll also led fundraising efforts to establish the first Black Canadian Studies program at Nova Scotia's Dalhousie University. In 1996, she founded the Beverly Mascoll Community Foundation to assist "youth, women and people of color".

Education also played a significant role in Mascoll's life. She was keen on educating her customers, organizing trade events and seminars specific to her clientele. Mascoll was also passionate about her own educational pursuits. Not being able to afford a university education after high-school, Mascoll, at age 55, enrolled full-time in the Women's Studies program at York University. She received her Bachelor of Arts in 2000.

== Awards and achievements ==
- Received the Governor General's Commemorative Medal
- Received the YMCA Women of Distinction Award for Entrepreneurship (1993)
- Received the Canadian Council of Christians and Jews Award (1995)
- Received the Harry Jerome Award for Achievement in Business.
- Co-chair of Toronto’s fundraising campaign for the James Robinson Johnston Chair in Black Canadian Studies at Dalhousie University
- Vice-president of the Canadian Club of Toronto
- Trustee for the Harry Jerome Scholarship fund
- Director of the Ontario Science Centre

In 1999, Beverly Mascoll was granted an honorary Doctor of Laws from Ryerson University (now Toronto Metropolitan University).

The Beverly Mascoll Award is a scholarship for black female students at the Ted Rogers School of Management at Toronto Metropolitan University. Eldon Mascoll presented the inaugural award, named after his late mother, on March 4, 2019.

Beverly Mascoll died from complications due to breast cancer in 2001, aged 59. She was buried at Mount Pleasant Cemetery, Toronto.
