= Catholic New Times =

Canadian Roman Catholic newspaper

- Type: bi-weekly newspaper
- Founded: December 2, 1976; 49 years ago
- Ceased publication: November 26, 2006
- Language: English
- City: Toronto, Ontario
- Country: Canada
- ISSN: 0701-0788

Catholic New Times was a Canadian Roman Catholic newspaper founded in 1976 by social activists, including Mary Jo Leddy, Fr. Jim Webb SJ, Fr. Tom McKillop, Fr. Bud Smith SFM, Sr. Margaret Ordway IBVM, and Jim Morin who proposed a collective organizational model which began with twelve people. The Catholic New Times was incorporated by letters patent in the Province of Ontario on December 13, 1976, with the objective of promoting the advancement of religion in Canada.

For over 30 years, its editors, writers and supporters included many Canadian Catholics interested in social justice. Its editors included Mary Jo Leddy, Janet Somerville, Sr. Frances Ryan OSU, Sr. Anne O'Brien CSIC, Maura Hanrahan, Ted Schmidt and Diane Bisson.

== History ==
Catholic New Times was considered a non-profit corporation and was registered as a charitable organization in 1977. The newspaper had no mandate or financial support from any particular diocese or Catholic institution but sought to act as an alternative and independent Catholic voice in Canada. The newspaper focused on local, national and international news and issues of concern to Catholics. The newspaper was published bi-weekly in Toronto from December 2, 1976, until November 26, 2006, when the newspaper had to close as a result of declining financial support.

== Organizational structure ==
Catholic New Times Inc. initially operated using a " collective model " that consisted of three main groupings: office staff who ran the paper, a working group ("the Collective") that met bi-weekly to plan issues and set editorial and general policy, and the editorial group (which included staff) that met weekly to generate stories and determine the details of each issue. By September 1982, committees composed of collective members, staff, and volunteers had emerged to handle particular needs: promotion, finance, personnel, and editorial. In 1989 to 1990, the corporation underwent a structural reorganization to form a Membership Group of 25-30 people who then elected a Publishing Group of about 10 people from among themselves. The Membership Group met twice a year, with the business conducted at the fall meeting; the Publishing Group, which also acted as the Board of Directors, met with the editor 10 times per year. Members also sat on one of four committees (Editorial, Finance, Human resources, and Marketing) that met according to its specific needs.

== Archive ==
The last editor of the Catholic New Times was Diane Bisson. Bisson donated the records of the magazine to the John M. Kelly Library at the University of St. Michael's College at the University of Toronto in 2007. The Catholic New Times Inc. fonds consists of minutes, reports, proposals and other materials prepared for meetings of committees and groups within Catholic New Times from 1976 to 2006. Fonds also includes incoming and outgoing correspondence from 1975 to 1983; documents relating to the incorporation of the Catholic New Times in 1976 and subsequent changes in directors; materials documenting the mission and structure of the corporation and processes and procedures for producing the newspaper; subject files containing clippings and reports from organizations of interest to Catholic New Times members and staff; and audio-visual materials created by and for the Catholic New Times.
