= Angelo Branca =

Canadian judge (1903–1984)

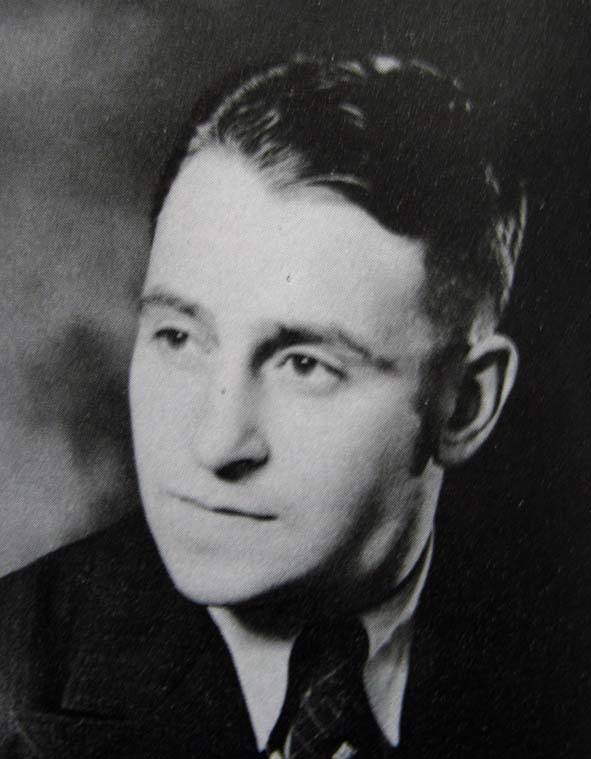

Judge of the British Columbia Court of Appeal
- In office 1966–1978

Judge of the Supreme Court of British Columbia
- In office 1963–1966

Personal details
- Born: March 21, 1903 Vancouver Island, British Columbia, Canada
- Died: October 3, 1984 (aged 81)
- Occupation: Lawyer
- Awards: Yeshiva University award (1969); Medal of the President of Israel (1976); Abraham Lincoln International Reverence of Law award (1977)

Angelo Branca (March 21, 1903 – October 3, 1984) was a judge in British Columbia's Supreme Court and Court of Appeal from 1963 until 1978, a prominent Italian-Canadian leader, especially of the Vancouver Italian community, and a Canadian amateur middleweight boxing champion.

== Early life ==
Angelo Branca was born in what is now a ghost town on Mount Sicker on Vancouver Island to Italian immigrant parents. Branca's father, Filippo, was a miner before joining the Klondike Gold Rush and becoming one of its few success stories after returning with $10,000 ($250,000 in 2025 dollars). The family eventually settled in Vancouver's East End, where Angelo attended school at Lord Strathcona Elementary and Britannia Secondary schools.

== Early career ==
Branca began practicing law in 1926, and opened his law office on the second story of the Royal Bank building at Main and Hastings Streets. Many of his early cases were defending local bootleggers and he earned a reputation as "A dear friend of the little guy" for his willingness to provide his services pro bono, particularly during the lean depression years. Branca soon earned a reputation as one of the most formidable defense lawyers in the province, attracting a rich and powerful clientele in addition to the downtrodden in his old neighbourhood. Throughout his career, he defended 63 people charged with murder and only four of those were convicted.

== Career highlights ==
In 1938, Branca became the youngest prosecutor in the province. His first case was to prosecute unemployed rioters who, after being brutally ejected from a sitdown strike at the post office paraded east down Hastings Street, smashing windows along the way.

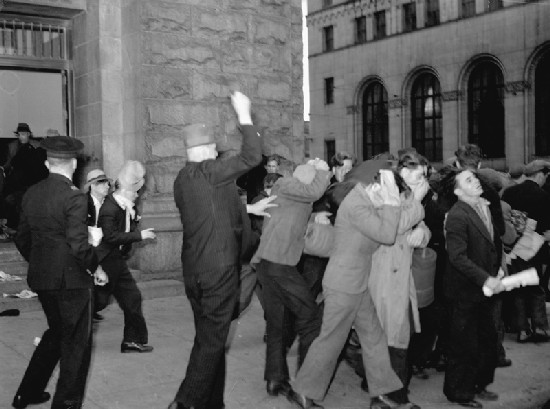
RCMP beating recently teargassed protesters after a 1938 "sitdowners" occupation of the Post Office. This was Angelo Branca's first case as a prosecutor.

The brutality of the RCMP in its treatment of the downtrodden protesters provoked a major public outcry. The next day, ten thousand people turned out to a protest at the Powell Street Grounds (today's Oppenheimer Park). Because there was little chance of a jury of peers convicting the rioters, Branca convinced the Attorney-General to stay most of the charges, and of the 23 charged, only two were convicted but received only small fines that were paid by sympathizers.

Other notorious local cases Branca worked included the defense of 17 Vancouver Police officers that were purged from the force in 1935 by the reform administration of Mayor Gerry McGeer. Almost all of them were reinstated and exonerated, thanks to Branca's efforts. Also in 1935, Branca defended Vancouver's "Public Enemy number one," local brothel keeper and bootlegger, Joe Celona. During the Second World War, Branca came to the defense of Italians who had been interned as a threat to national security. Branca was also a lead attorney in prosecuting the "Mulligan Affair" in 1955, in which the police chief was found to have established an elaborate "pay off" system with segments of the criminal underworld.

== Later life ==
Branca was appointed to the bench of the Supreme Court of British Columbia in 1963, and elevated to the bench of the Court of Appeal of British Columbia in 1966 where he served until his retirement in 1978.

A statue of Christopher Columbus was erected in 1986 on Clark Drive at the Piazza Italia. It was dedicated to Branca for his leadership in the local Italian community and was donated by the Italian City of Genoa. In 2000, the monument mysteriously disappeared, apparently stolen, only to later reappear at the Italian Garden at Hastings Park. The likely reason for the guerrilla relocation is that the original Clark Drive site, to the dismay of the Italian community, became a busy thoroughfare for transport trucks and hence unfriendly to pedestrian traffic.

== Awards ==
Branca was admitted as a lawyer to the BC bar in 1926 and was appointed Kings Counsel in 1949. These were the first steps of a long road that brought him to the pinnacle of his profession.

Branca was appointed to the BC Supreme Court in 1963 and then elevated to the BC Court of Appeal in 1966.

Branca mandatorily retired at the age of 75 and returned to the practice of law.

Between 1929 and 1963 Branca defended some 63 men charged with murder, he won acquittals for all but three. He prosecuted 7 murder trials.

The Canadian Lawyer magazine rated Branca as the most famous criminal defense lawyer in Canada's history.

Branca received an Honorary Doctor of Laws degree from St. Martin's college in Olympia Washington in 1973.

In addition, Branca was the recipient again of an Honorary Doctor of Laws degree from Simon Fraser University in 1975.

Branca received the Abraham Lincoln International Reverence of Law award from the Fraternal Order of Eagles, St. Louis Missouri, in 1977. He was the 11th recipient of this award in its history, first awarded to President Truman, and later to Chief Justice of the United States, Earl Warren. Branca was the first Canadian recipient.

Branca excelled in the boxing ring just as he did in the law courts. He was always physically fit which assisted him in his mental acuity. He ran 5 miles a day around McLean park before running was "in." He had a boxing bag mounted in his home in his basement and work out daily.

Branca’s boxing career was brief but as in everything he undertook, he excelled in it. To quote Mr. Branca: "I beat everyone I fought against in the ring by the fifth round." Branca went on to win the middleweight championship of Canada in 1934. On winning this championship, Branca was asked to become a professional fighter but at the age of 31, he made the decision to devote all his time and expertise to the law. Following this time of competition, Branca taught boys at the Vancouver College to box and was a mentor to them for many years.

In 1967, Branca invited former heavyweight champion of the world, Rocky Marciano to come to Vancouver to referee amateur in Vancouver to a great fanfare.

Branca's philanthropic involvement was legendary.

In 1966, Branca was a prime mover in the amalgamation of four of the oldest Italian Canadian societies in the City of Vancouver into one society bearing the name, Confratellanza Italo Canadese.

Branca was Co-Chairman of the Pacific region of the Canadian Council of Christians and Jews.

Branca was chairman of the Finance committee of Camp Miriam and dedicated his time to raising funds for children unable to pay for camp fees.

Branca was invested as a Knight of St. Gregory the Great by Pope Paul VI in 1977.

Branca was the second Canadian recipient of the Yeshiva University award from Yeshiva University in New York in 1969.

Branca was the recipient of an Honorary fellowship from the University of Bar-Ilan, Tel Aviv, Israel in 1976.

Branca was also the recipient of the medal of the President of Israel in 1976, at the time, the only other Canadian recipient of this award was the Prime Minister John Diefenbaker.
