= Shawbridge Boys' Farm =

Youth centre in Quebec, Canada

Shawbridge Boys' Farm, now Shawbridge Youth Centres, is a farm in Shawbridge, Quebec. It was originally used either as a training home for underprivileged, wayward, and orphaned boys or as a youth detention center. It is now called Shawbridge Youth Centres, and is owned and operated by Batshaw Youth and Family Services.

== History ==
The original idea originated in 1899, when James R. Dick, a superintendent of the Boys' Home of Montreal, suggested that a boys' home farm in the Laurentians be built and used for the training of delinquent boys. The farm was built in 1907, after eight years of planning, and a farm named Boys' Farm and Training School was built north of Montreal, in Shawbridge, a small town in the Laurentians.

Although the farm was being used to house orphans, criminals under the age of 21 were sent there to serve time for charges such as robbery, assault, or theft.

The farm had a separate charter granted in 1917, and was also sponsored later that same year by the Rotary Club of Toronto and Montreal, who proceeded to build a cottage on the farm. In total, the farm was sponsored for about $15,000 by the Rotary Club.

Like other buildings in the village, the houses were built from local materials such as red bricks and fieldstone quarried from the rock falls of the Piedmont mountain cliffs right behind Shawbridge.

== Present ==
Shawbridge Boys' Farm is now called Shawbridge Youth Centres, and is owned and operated by Batshaw Youth and Family Services, a government service meant to help families in difficulty.

Although it is mostly used as a chain of group homes that are isolated from the community, it is also used as a youth detention center. Past inmates used to be able to visit, but not anymore because it is now used as a jail.

== See also ==
- List of youth detention incidents in Canada
- List of provincial correctional facilities in Ontario
