= Isabelle Mondou =

Canadian public servant

Isabelle Mondou is a Canadian public servant who has served as the Deputy Clerk of the Privy Council and Associate Secretary to the Cabinet since December 2025. She previously served as Deputy Minister of Canadian Heritage. She is also a member of the Order of Canada Advisory Council, which recommends appointments to the Order.

== Early life and education ==
Mondou was born in the Laurentides region of Quebec. She earned a Bachelor of Laws (LL.B.) in 1989 and a Master of Laws (LL.M.) in 1994 from the Université de Montréal. She was admitted to the Barreau du Québec in 1990. Mondou resides in Ottawa and is a mother of two.

== Career ==
After being admitted to the bar, Mondou practiced law in the private sector, focusing on administrative law, environmental law, and municipal law.

She joined the Canadian federal public service in 1994 at the Department of National Revenue. She later held various positions at the Privy Council Office, including in intergovernmental affairs. Prior to 2016, she served as legal counsel to the Clerk of the Privy Council. From June 2015 to September 2016, she was Assistant Secretary to the Cabinet for Economic and Regional Development Policy at the Privy Council Office.

Mondou joined the Department of Canadian Heritage as Associate Deputy Minister on October 22, 2018. From April 2020 to April 2021, she was on assignment as Deputy Minister for the COVID-19 Response (Communications) at the Privy Council Office. She was appointed Deputy Minister of Canadian Heritage on May 3, 2021. In her role as Deputy Minister, Mondou has appeared before parliamentary committees, including the Standing Committee on Canadian Heritage, and has participated in international discussions on cultural policy and media.

Mondou has contributed to publications on public health ethics. She co-edited the book Réduction des méfaits et tolérance en santé publique: Enjeux éthiques et politiques (2013), and authored a chapter titled "De la définition de la réduction des méfaits: consensus et divergences."
