= Canadian Centre for Diversity =

Canadian charity

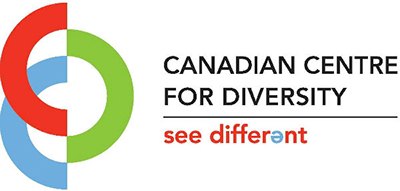
- Abbreviation: CCD
- Merged into: Canadian Centre for Diversity and Inclusion
- Formation: 1947
- Type: Registered charity
- Legal status: Merged (2014)
- Purpose: Anti-discrimination, diversity education
- Headquarters: Toronto, Ontario, Canada
- Region served: Canada
- Formerly called: Canadian Council for Christians and Jews

The Canadian Centre for Diversity (CCD) was a Canadian non-profit organization dedicated to diversity education and anti-discrimination programming. Originally founded in 1947 as the ''Canadian Council of Christians and Jews'' (CCCJ), the organization aimed to combat antisemitism and promote interfaith dialogue in the aftermath of World War II. Over the decades, its mandate broadened to address racism, prejudice, and systemic discrimination across Canadian society. In 2014, CCD merged with the Canadian Institute of Diversity and Inclusion, forming the Canadian Centre for Diversity and Inclusion (CCDI), which continues the CCD's mission.

== History ==
CCD began in 1947 as the Canadian Council of Christians and Jews (CCCJ), modeled after similar interfaith efforts in the United States and Europe. Its initial purpose was to reduce antisemitism and foster understanding between Christian and Jewish communities in Canada.

In 2008, CCCJ officially rebranded as the Canadian Centre for Diversity to better reflect its expanded commitment to all forms of diversity, including race, religion, sexual orientation, and ability.

== Programs and initiatives ==
CCD was responsible for delivering educational initiatives that worked to educate Canadians on the value of inclusion of people from different racial, ethnic and religious identities. CCD developed several national education programs targeting high school and university students. Notable initiatives included:

- March of Remembrance and Hope: An annual educational journey bringing Canadian university students to Holocaust sites in Europe to teach about the dangers of hate, bigotry, and intolerance. The march is still run today by the March of the Living Canada.
- Peer Leaders Network: A student-led initiative focused on promoting diversity and inclusion in Canadian high schools. In 2012–2013, the program involved over 30,000 students across eight school boards.

=== Human Relations Awards ===
The Human Relations Awards were the Canadian Centre for Diversity's signature annual fundraising and recognition events, established to honor individuals and organizations that demonstrated leadership in promoting diversity, equity, and inclusion in Canada. These awards were intended to highlight those whose actions significantly advanced the CCD’s mission of reducing prejudice and fostering social cohesion.

Recipients came from a broad spectrum of Canadian society, including business, the arts, education, and community service. Notable honorees included:

- Allan R. Taylor, Canadian businessman
- Beverly Mascoll, Canadian businesswoman
- Canadian Imperial Bank of Commerce (CIBC)
- Donald J. Smith, Canadian entrepreneur
- Francis Anthony Comper, Canadian banker
- Hassanali Lakhani, philanthropist
- Heather Reisman, Canadian businesswoman
- Hilary Weston, former Lieutenant Governor of Ontario and philanthropist
- Howard Sokolowski, property developer
- Ivan Fecan, Canadian businessman
- Judith Feld Carr, Canadian educator
- Father Lucien Larré, Canadian priest
- Linda Frum, Canadian politician
- Louise Arbour, former UN High Commissioner for Human Rights and Canadian Supreme Court justice
- Mary Jo Leddy, Canadian writer and theologian
- Salah Bachir, philanthropist and arts patron
- Sandra Faire, television producer and philanthropist
- Wilson A. Head, American-Canadian sociologist

These events helped raise awareness, build community support, and generate funds to sustain CCD’s educational programs.

== Leadership ==
Throughout its history, CCD was guided by a volunteer board and executive leadership drawn from Canadian business, education, and community sectors. Janice O’Born, chair of the board in 2013, was instrumental in overseeing the transition during the merger with CIDI. Other leaders have included:

- A. Boyd Ferris (Canadian lawyer)
- Angelo Branca (Canadian judge)
- Barney Danson (Canadian politician)
- Edward Flannery (American priest and author)
- Harry Batshaw (Canadian judge)
- Isadore Sharp (Canadian businessman)
- James (Jimmy) Kay (Canadian businessman)
- Janice O'Borne (Canadian philanthropist)
- Joseph J. Barnicke (Canadian businessman)
- June Westbury (Canadian politician)
- Laurent Desjardins (Canadian politician)
- Linda McCain (Canadian philanthropist)
- R. Lou Ronson (Canadian businessman)
- Mike Feldman (Canadian politician)
- Muriel Kovitz (Canadian academic)
- Murray Koffler (Canadian businessman)
- Rabbi David Aaron Monson (Canadian Rabbi)
- Victor Goldbloom (Canadian politician)

== Merger and legacy ==
In September 2013, CCD announced it would cease operations due to unsustainable funding. In early 2014, the organization merged with the Canadian Institute of Diversity and Inclusion (CIDI), founded in 2012 by diversity advocate Michael Bach. The merger was framed as a continuation of CCD’s legacy, with CIDI taking over key educational programs.

In 2015, the merged entity was formally renamed the Canadian Centre for Diversity and Inclusion (CCDI), continuing both workplace-focused and youth educational initiatives.

== See also ==
- Antisemitism in Canada
