= Canadian Centre for Diversity and Inclusion =

Canadian charitable organization

Canadian Centre for Diversity and Inclusion (CCDI)
- Canadian Centre for Diversity and Inclusion
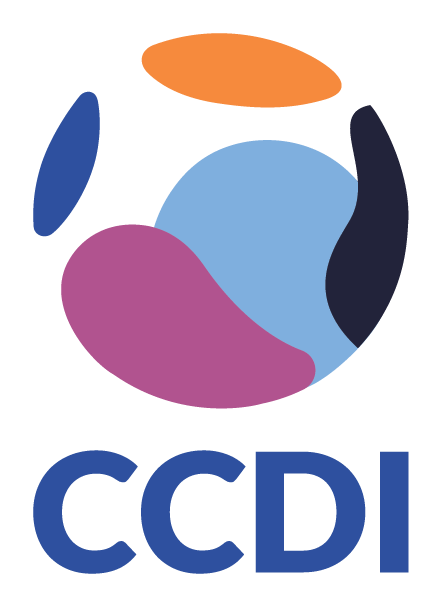
- CCDI Logo
- Abbreviation: CCDI
- Predecessor: The Canadian Institute of Diversity and Inclusion (CIDI)
- Formation: 2014
- Founder: Michael Bach
- Merger of: Canadian Centre for Diversity and Canadian Institute of Diversity and Inclusion
- Type: Charitable organizations (Canada)
- Legal status: Charity
- Purpose: To help build a more inclusive Canada by bringing together and supporting people to become change agents through thought leadership, research, education, and action.
- Headquarters: 1 Dundas Street West, Suite 2500, Toronto, ON, M5G1Z3, Canada
- Location: Canada
- Official language: English and French
- President and CEO: Sartaj Sarkaria
- Board of directors: Marni Panas (Director and Chair), Paul Twigg (Director), Marie-Eve Noël (Director), Nadeem Mansour (Director), Soula Courlas (Director), Jasmine Tsang (Director), Jonathan Soon-Shiong (Director), Chantal Dugas (Director), Michelle Plouffe (Director), Anna Tudela (Director)
- Website: ccdi.ca

The Canadian Centre for Diversity and Inclusion (CCDI) (French: Centre canadien pour la diversité et l'inclusion) is a national charitable organization. It was established in 2014/5 as a merger of the Canadian Centre for Diversity and the Canadian Institute of Diversity and Inclusion (CIDI).

== History ==
CCDI is a merger of two organizations – the Canadian Centre for Diversity (CCD) and the Canadian Institute of Diversity and Inclusion (CIDI) – that took place in 2014. The merger was initiated because CCD had announced they were closing due to funding issues. To allow the CCD's programs to continue, the CIDI and CCD entered into a dialogue about a merger which would provide stable funding.

The Canadian Centre for Diversity (CCD; originally called the Canadian Council for Christians and Jews) was founded in 1947 to address issues of antisemitism and promote interfaith dialogue. The mandate expanded in subsequent years to focus on addressing issues related to racism, and religious discrimination in Canadian society. Their primary focus was on providing school programs to educate students on issues related to bullying, bias, and discrimination. The CCCJ changed its name in 2008 to the Canadian Centre for Diversity to be more reflective of its broader mandate. In September 2013, the board of directors of the CCD announced that it was closing due to a lack of ongoing funding.

The Canadian Institute of Diversity and Inclusion (CIDI) was founded in 2012 by Michael Bach, the former national director of diversity, equity, and inclusion for KPMG in Canada, a role he created and held for seven years. Bach's vision was to create a non-profit organization that would support employers along their diversity and inclusion journey. By the middle of 2013 CIDI had secured its founding employer partners, had a staff of five, and was operating in four cities across Canada.

Merger talks began between the two organizations at the end of 2013. Bach was named the CEO of CCDI to facilitate the merger over the course of 2014. The merger officially took place in 2015.

In June 2025, Sartaj Sarkaria was named CEO

== Description and governance ==
The mission of CIDI is to help the individuals and organizations they work with to be inclusive, and free of prejudice and discrimination – and to generate the awareness, dialogue and action for people to recognize diversity as an asset and not an obstacle.

In July 2022, Anne-Marie Pham was named Chief Executive Officer of the Canadian Centre for Diversity and Inclusion.

== Awards of Success ==
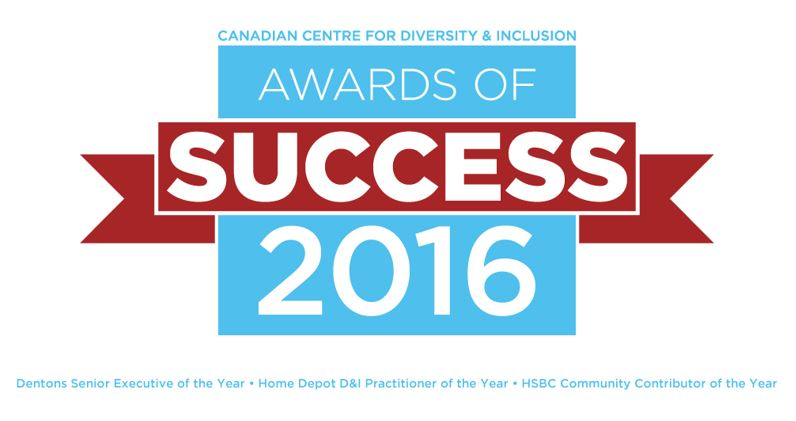
Awards of Success Logo

In 2016 CCDI launched the Awards of Success to acknowledge the contribution of three individuals who have gone above and beyond to promote diversity and inclusion. The Awards of Success recognize three people in the following categories:

- Senior Executive of the Year
- Diversity and Inclusion Practitioner of the Year
- Community Contributor of the Year

In their first year, the awards went to Simon Fish, general counsel, BMO Financial Group (Senior Executive of the Year); Normand St. Gelais, director, diversity & inclusion, Sodexo (Diversity and Inclusion Practitioner of the Year); and Malinda Smith, professor, University of Alberta.

== Campaigns ==
CCDI has released several educational campaigns to raise awareness and inspire discussion on diversity and inclusion in Canada.

=== TalkingASL ===
To help raise awareness of available resources related to American Sign Language (ASL, in French Langue des Signes Québécoise or LSQ) CCDI created TalkingASL.ca (in French ParlantLSQ.ca) - a free library ofASL related resources in Canada.

=== Sochi Olympics ===
In view of the 2014 Olympic protests of Russian anti-gay laws, the (then) Canadian Institute of Diversity and Inclusion released a humorous public service announcement to draw attention to the ongoing anti-gay laws controversy coupled with the Olympics being held in Russia. In it the jest that the Games have always been a little gay, and should be kept that way.

=== Save Syria ===
In response to the death of Alan Kurdi, a Syrian infant who drowned while his family was fleeing war-torn Syrian, CCDI issued a call to action to Canada's largest employers to contribute to help with the resettlement of Syrian refugees in Canada. They created the Save Syria campaign and the Syrian Refugee Relief Fund.

The fund raised over $200,000 and 100% of the funds go to support the resettlement of Syrian refugees in Canada who have been privately sponsored (as opposed to government-sponsored refugees).

=== #EndTheBan ===
In an effort to raise awareness of the deferral against men who have sex with men (MSMs) from donating blood, CCDI produced a public service announcement referred to as "Gay Blood", and created the hashtag #EndTheBan. The objective was to point out that there is no such thing as "gay blood" and that the deferral against MSMs was not based on science, but on outdated information, and was ultimately discriminatory.

The PSA received significant attention and the result was that Canadian Blood Services reached out to CCDI to include them on the work to develop the research needed to remove the deferral entirely and move toward a behavioral based deferral. Further, CCDI played an influential role in securing the funding required to conduct the research which began in January 2017.

== Conferences ==
The CCDI sometimes speaks at conferences with business leaders to discuss how to incorporate diversity, equity, and inclusion strategies. For example, Anne-Marie Pham, the CEO of CCDI spoke at the Winnipeg Chamber of Commerce’s second Commitment to Opportunity, Diversity and Equity (CODE) Conference in 2023. The conference had 280 attendees.

== Global Inclusion & Diversity Alliance (GIDA) ==
In 2023 Diversity Council Australia, along with CCDI, Community Business (Asia), and Diversity Works New Zealand, launched the Global Inclusion & Diversity Alliance (GIDA). It was officially launched at the Whiria Ngā Kaha Workplace Inclusion Aotearoa 2023 international conference, held in Auckland, New Zealand, from 15 to 17 February 2023. The alliance is a community of practice for peak bodies for diversity and inclusion from around the world. The partner organisations work together to improve workplace equity worldwide.

== See also ==
- Antisemitism in Canada
