= Amber Hall (basketball) =

Canadian basketball player

Personal information
- Born: December 27, 1977 (age 48) Windsor, Ontario, Canada
- Listed height: 6 ft 3 in (1.91 m)
- Listed weight: 186 lb (84 kg)

Career information
- High school: Britannia Secondary School (Vancouver, British Columbia)
- College: Washington (1995–1999)
- WNBA draft: 1999: undrafted
- Position: Forward

Career history
- 2002: Portland Fire

Career highlights
- 2× First-team All Pac-10 (1998, 1999)
- Stats at Basketball Reference

Amber Jade Hall (born December 29, 1977) is a Canadian former professional basketball player who played for the Portland Fire of the WNBA. Her primary position was forward.

== Early life ==
Born in Windsor, Ontario, Canada, Hall was raised in Vancouver, British Columbia, where she attended Britannia Secondary School. Hall is the only person to have ever played in the WNBA coming from Vancouver.

== College career ==
Hall became Washington's career-leading rebounder in the final regular season game of the year at Washington State in 1998–99.

== Professional career ==
Hall played 20 games for the Portland Fire, the only team Hall played for in a regular-season game.

== Career statistics ==
Legend
GP	Games played	GS	Games started	MPG	Minutes per game	RPG	Rebounds per game
APG	Assists per game	SPG	Steals per game	BPG	Blocks per game	PPG	Points per game
TO	Turnovers per game	FG%	Field-goal percentage	3P%	3-point field-goal percentage	FT%	Free-throw percentage
**Bold**	Career best	°	League leader

=== WNBA ===
==== Regular season ====
WNBA regular season statistics
Year	Team	GP	GS	MPG	FG%	3P%	FT%	RPG	APG	SPG	BPG	TO	PPG
2002	Portland	20	0	5.2	.458	—	.500	1.3	0.1	0.4	0.1	0.6	1.5
**Career**	1 year, 1 team	20	0	5.2	.458	—	.500	1.3	0.1	0.4	0.1	0.6	1.5

=== College ===
NCAA statistics
Year	Team	GP	GS	MPG	FG%	3P%	FT%	RPG	APG	SPG	BPG	TO	PPG
1995–96	Washington	27			**.500**	—	.485	6.1	0.3	1.1	0.6		6.3
1996–97	Washington	22			.457	.000	.462	11.1	0.7	2.3	**1.1**		13.2
1997–98	Washington	**28**			.412	.000	**.605**	**11.2**	**1.3**	2.4	0.6		**17.3**
1998–99	Washington	27			.417	.000	.575	10.4	1.2	**2.5**	**1.1**		14.4
**Career**		104	—	—	.433	.000	.551	9.6	0.9	2.1	0.8	—	12.8
