= Sainte-Félicité, Quebec =

There are two municipalities called Sainte-Félicité in Quebec:

- Sainte-Félicité, Bas-Saint-Laurent, in La Matanie Regional County Municipality, Quebec
- Sainte-Félicité, Chaudière-Appalaches, in L'Islet Regional County Municipality, Quebec
- Sainte-Félicité, Quebec (designated place), former village in Sainte-Félicité, Bas-Saint-Laurent
