= TD Canada Trust Scholarship for Community Leadership =

The TD Scholarships for Community Leadership is one of the largest and most prestigious scholarships of its kind in Canada offered by Toronto Dominion Bank worth up to $70,000.

== TD Scholarship Award ==
This scholarship recognizes high school and CEGEP students entering university or college based on their outstanding community leadership. Each TD Canada Trust Scholarship is valued at up to $70,000 and includes full tuition for up to four years of study, $7,500 per year toward living expenses, and an offer of summer employment at TD. Every year up to 20 exemplary young people are chosen as recipients of the scholarships. Students across Canada are invited to apply, and five regional judging panels that include prominent educators, politicians, and community representatives review applications.

The scholarship program has been in operation since 1995, and has already awarded over 360 deserving young Canadians. A National Ceremony is held annually in May to honour the year's recipients, with government officials, TD executives and community leaders in attendance.
