= Mark Batshaw =

American geneticist

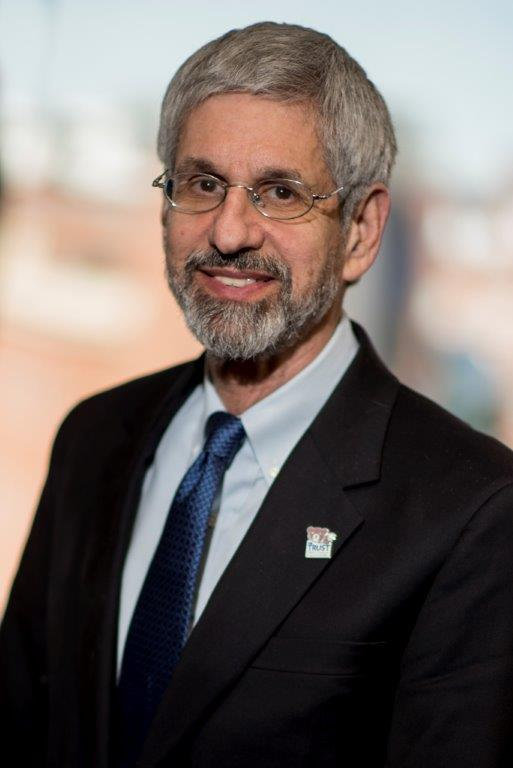
- Born: 19 September 1945 (age 81); Montreal, Canada
- Education: University of Pennsylvania, University of Chicago
- Known for: Study of urea cycle disorders
- Scientific career
- Fields: Pediatrics
- Workplaces: Children's National Medical Center, Children’s Hospital of Philadelphia, Kennedy Krieger Institute

Mark Levitt Batshaw (born 19 September 1945) is a Canadian-born physician, medical researcher and academic administrator. He was a professor in the department of pediatrics and an associate dean at the George Washington University School of Medicine & Health Sciences and was the physician-in-chief and chief academic officer at Children's National Hospital in Washington, D.C. He is known for his research into urea cycle disorders and gene therapy, and is the author of the classic textbook "Children with Disabilities".

== Biography ==
Batshaw was born in Montreal, Canada, in 1945 and is a United States citizen. His father, Manuel G. Batshaw, was a social worker. Batshaw manifested dyslexia and attention deficit hyperactivity disorder as a child at a time where there were limited special education services or medication for treatment. It was this experience that led him to the fields of developmental pediatrics and genetics.

Batshaw received his M.D. from the University of Chicago Pritzker School of Medicine in 1971, performed his pediatric residency at The Hospital for Sick Children, University of Toronto, and his clinical fellowship at the Kennedy Krieger Institute, Johns Hopkins Hospital.

From 1988-1998, Batshaw was Physician-in-Chief of the Children’s Seashore House at the Children’s Hospital of Philadelphia. He is a professor at the George Washington University School of Medicine & Health Sciences where he was Chair of Pediatrics, Associate Dean for Academic Affairs at the university, and Chief Academic Officer and Physician-in-Chief at Children's National Medical Center. He has served as president of both the Society for Inherited Metabolic Disorders and the American Pediatric Society.

He and his wife Karen are the parents of three children.

== Research ==
During his clinical fellowship at the Kennedy Krieger Institute, Batshaw and his colleague Saul Brusilow developed a successful treatment for a fatal urea cycle disorder. The treatment, involving sodium phenylbutyrate and glycerol phenylbutyrate, is still in use.

In 1988, Batshaw moved from Johns Hopkins to the University of Pennsylvania where he began a collaboration with James Wilson. They developed an adenovirus vector and started a gene therapy clinical trial that resulted in the death of a patient, Jesse Gelsinger, in 1999 and a subsequent slowdown of the development of gene therapy. In the past decade, the field has recovered and Wilson and Batshaw’s teams have developed an adeno-associated virus vector that has been successful in preclinical studies of an animal model of urea cycle disorders.
