= Harry Batshaw =

American lawyer

- Born: 14 October 1902; Dubroŭna, Mogilev Governorate, Russian Empire (now Belarus)
- Died: 1984 (aged 81–82)
- Known for: Justice

Harry Batshaw (14 October 1902 – 1984) was a Canadian lawyer and a justice of the Quebec Superior Court. Justice Batshaw was the first Jewish Canadian to be appointed to a superior court in Canada.

Born in 1902 at Dubroŭna, Mogilev Governorate, Russian Empire (now Belarus), Batshaw emigrated to Canada with his parents in 1904. He graduated from the McGill University Faculty of Law in 1924. After winning a scholarship, he did postgraduate work at the University of Grenoble and the Sorbonne. Returning to Montreal, he practiced law for 25 years. In 1940, he was appointed a King's Counsel. In 1950, Prime Minister Louis St. Laurent appointed him to the Quebec Superior Court. He served until retiring in 1977.

From 1931 to 1934, he was president of Canadian Young Judea, Canada's largest Zionist youth movement. From 1944 to 1950, he was head of the public relations committee of the Zionist Organization of Canada. He was president and founder of the Canadian Friends of the Alliance Israelite Universelle and was the Quebec Co-chairman of the Canadian Council of Christians and Jews. In 1962, he was awarded the Medal of Merit by the Government of France. In 1976 he was made an honorary Fellow of the Hebrew University of Jerusalem.

He was buried in Montreal's Shaar Hashomayim Congregation Cemetery.

== See also ==
- Batshaw Youth Services
