= Batshaw Youth and Family Centres =

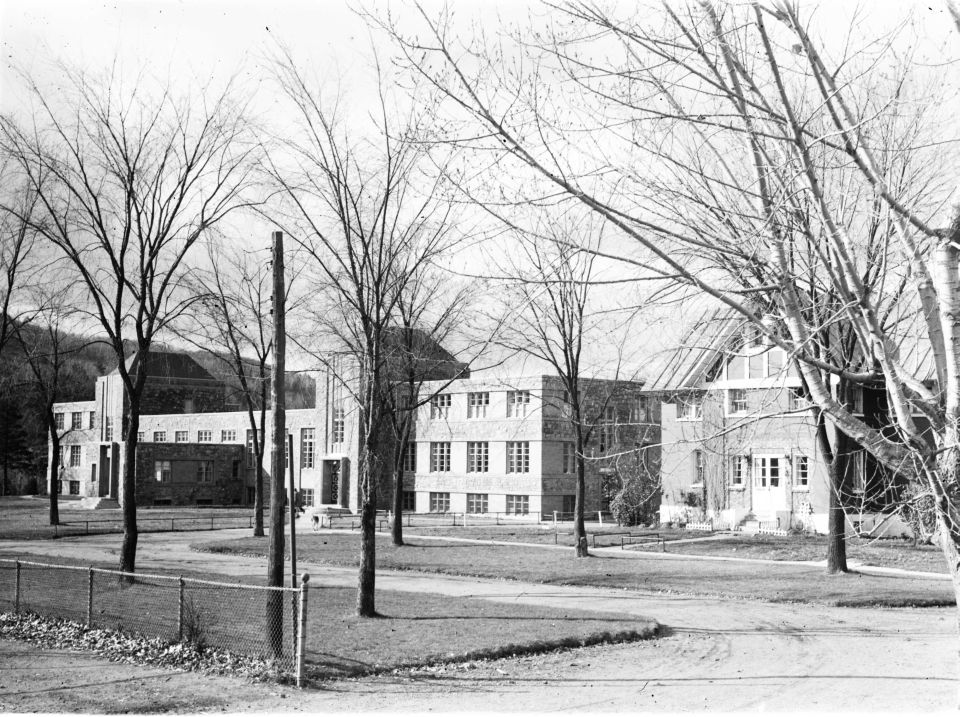
- Boys' Farm and Training School, Saint Jacques Street, Montreal.
- Founded: Founded in 1992 Named after Manuel Batshaw
- Headquarters: Westmount, Quebec, Canada
- Area served: Montreal
- Website: www.batshaw.qc.ca www.batshawfoundation.ca

Batshaw Youth and Family Centres (also known as Batshaw, Batshaw Centres, or Batshaw Youth and Family Services, French: Les Centres de la jeunesse et de la famille Batshaw), is a government funded organization in Montreal, Quebec, Canada that is devoted to the welfare of children and their families. Batshaw is entirely funded by the Government of Québec.

Maclean's described it as "Quebec’s anglophone child welfare agency", while the Direction de la protection de la jeunesse (DPJ) has that function for French-speaking families.

Its head office is in Westmount, on Montreal Island.

== History ==
Batshaw was created in 1992 as a non-profit organization, used as a government agency to help children and their families. Batshaw youth and family services is an amalgamation of several other preexisting child welfare agencies; Youth Horizons, Shawbridge Youth and Family Centres, Ville-Marie Social Services (VMSS) and Mount St. Pats, that were combined to make one agency.

In 2015 the provincial government placed Batshaw in the hierarchy of the Montreal West Island Integrated University Health and Social Services Centre (Centre intégré universitaire de santé et de services sociaux (CIUSSS) de l'Ouest-de-l'Île-de-Montréal).

In 2021, it announced it would begin providing Inuktitut language materials in its facilities.

== Name ==
Batshaw Youth and Family Centres is named in honour of Manuel G. Batshaw, a social worker and renowned activist. Manuel Batshaw was in the Canadian Armed Forces before he started working in the Social Service network. Social Services.

== Present ==
Presently, Batshaw Youth and Family Centres runs a series of group homes across Montreal, as well as youth detention centers. A notable chain of group homes run by Batshaw is the Shawbridge Boys' Farm in the Laurentians, 75 kilometers north of Montreal.
