= Diversity Council Australia =

Not-for-profit independent organisation

Diversity Council Australia (DCA), formerly the Council for Equal Employment Opportunity, is an independent not-for-profit peak body for the promotion of diversity and inclusion in the workplace, funded mainly by membership fees, sponsorships and services to business/employers. It undertakes research, holds events, and shares its knowledge and resources. In 2023 DCA, along with the Canadian Centre for Diversity and Inclusion, Community Business (Asia), and Diversity Works New Zealand, launched the Global Inclusion & Diversity Alliance (GIDA).

As of March 2025, Catherine Hunter is CEO, while Sunita Gloster chairs the board of the organisation.

== History ==
In July 1984 the Commonwealth Government ran a one-year pilot program looking affirmative action, with 28 companies and three tertiary institutions participating. It was administered by the Office of the Status of Women, under Senator Susan Ryan, and the Business Council of Australia (BCA) was also involved.

Upon completion of the pilot, BCA, in cooperation with the Confederation of Australian Industry (forerunner of the Australian Chamber of Commerce and Industry) announced in September 1985 that it would establish a Council for Equal Employment Opportunity, to develop programs within industry to provide equal opportunities for women and men. The council was supported by several of Australia's largest companies. Founding members include ANZ Bank, AMP, AXA, BHP, Boral, Coles, IBM Australia, Myer, Orica, Rio Tinto, and Westpac.

Originally planned to run for five years, by which time its work would be complete, it was found that there was continuing demand for its expertise and services. These were expanded, and the Council for Equal Employment Opportunity changed its name to Diversity Council Australia Ltd in 2005.

== Description, governance, and funding ==
DCA is a not-for-profit organisation and charity, whose purpose is "to promote and advance inclusion and diversity through the creation of more diverse and inclusive workplaces for the benefit of individuals, organisations and the broader community, with a focus on individuals that have been historically disadvantaged or underrepresented in the labour market". Its member organisations employ around 20 per cent of the Australian workforce.

In April 2021, Lisa Annese was CEO, and Ming Long was chair of the DCA board. Sunita Gloster was appointed chair in June 2024, after joining the board in May of that year. Annese served as CEO until December 2024.

Catherine Hunter, was appointed CEO in February 2025, to commence in the role in March. She spent several years at Woolworths and before that, 17 years at KPMG, leading its corporate citizenship function and strategy from 2005 until 2021. As of March 2025, Sunita Gloster chairs the board.

DCA is not funded by government, apart from (in 2025), a single research project on creating pathways to leadership for culturally and racially marginalised women, which obtained a grant from the federal government. Its income is drawn from a combination of membership fees, sponsorships, and paid services provided to businesses. As of March 2025 its major partners are IAG, KPMG, HSBC, and Gilbert + Tobin law firm.

== GIDA ==
In 2023 DCA, along with the Canadian Centre for Diversity and Inclusion, Community Business (Asia), and Diversity Works New Zealand, launched the Global Inclusion & Diversity Alliance (GIDA). It was officially launched at the Whiria Ngā Kaha Workplace Inclusion Aotearoa 2023 international conference, held in Auckland, Aotearoa/New Zealand, from 15 to 17 February 2023. The alliance is a community of practice for peak bodies for diversity and inclusion from around the world. The partner organisations work together to improve workplace equity worldwide.

== Work ==
=== Campaigns ===
In 2021, DCA coordinated the #IStandForRespect campaign, promoting zero-tolerance for sexual harassment. Businesses were asked to sign a pledge, promising to do two things:

- Stand against gendered harassment and violence in all its forms
- Commit to taking steps in their organisation to address sexual and sex-based harassment, to make the workplace safer for everyone

By April 2021, over 100 CEOs of major private-sector companies and organisations of all types had signed the pledge.

In 2023, under CEO Lisa Annese and chair Ming Long, DCA launched the "Directors for the Voice" campaign, garnering thousands of signatures from Australian company directors in support for the Indigenous Voice to Parliament.

=== Events and reports ===
Every second year, the DCA surveys 3,000 representative workers in across Australia to produce its Inclusion@Work Index. The reports have suggested that improving diversity and inclusion can improve the well-being of employees at the same time as increasing innovation and enriching customer service. It recognises organisations as an "Inclusive Employer" each year as a result of its Inclusion@Work Index.

The organisation held a CEO Roundtable event and Member Key Contact Forum hosted by Clough in September 2024. This is networking event, which brings together from many organisations to discuss diversity and inclusion initiatives, identify key areas for growth and to encourage new initiatives.

Diversity Council Australia holds an annual debate, known as the Diversity Debate. The 2024 event was held on 22 October in Sydney, on the topic "Is polarisation holding diversity and inclusion back?". The debate was moderated by journalist Patricia Karvelas, with the affirmative team comprising Michael Hing; Dee Madigan; and Thomas Mayo, while the negative argument was debated by a team comprising Graeme Innes; executive manager culture, inclusion & community, at IAG Niki Kesoglou; and comedian and composer Lou Wall. The majority of the audience 62% , voted with the affirmative team.

== See also ==
- Diversity, equity, and inclusion policies of the second Trump administration
