= Order of Canada =

Canadian national order

Order of Canada Ordre du Canada
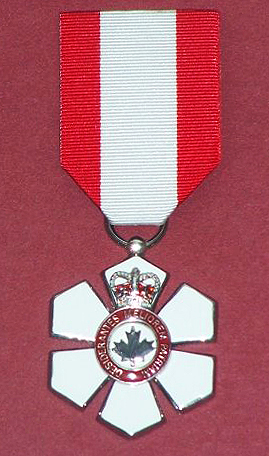
- Insignia of a Member (Note: A replica of Father Maurice Proulx's Order of Canada insignia at the Musée québécois de l'agriculture et de l'alimentation in La Pocatière, Quebec.)

Awarded by the Crown of Canada
- Type: National order
- Established: 17 April 1967
- Motto: Desiderantes meliorem patriam (Latin for 'They desire a better country')
- Eligibility: All living Canadians, except federal and provincial politicians and judges while holding office
- Criteria: The highest degree of merit, an outstanding level of talent and service, or an exceptional contribution to Canada and humanity
- Status: Currently constituted
- Founder: Elizabeth II
- Sovereign: Charles III
- Chancellor and Principal Companion: Louise Arbour, Governor General of Canada
- Grades: Companion (CC); Officer (OC); Member (CM)
- Former grades: Medal of Service; Medal of Courage

Statistics
- First induction: 1 July 1967
- Total inductees: 8,729 (as of January 2026)

Precedence
- Next (higher): Member of the Order of Merit
- Next (lower): Commander of the Order of Military Merit

The Order of Canada (French: Ordre du Canada) is a Canadian national order and the second-highest honour for merit in the system of orders, decorations, and medals of Canada, after the Order of Merit.

To coincide with the centennial of Canadian Confederation, the three-tiered order was established in 1967 as a fellowship recognizing the outstanding merit or distinguished service of Canadians who make a major difference to Canada through lifelong contributions in every field of endeavour, as well as efforts by non-Canadians who have made the world better by their actions. Membership is accorded to those who exemplify the order's Latin motto, desiderantes meliorem patriam, meaning "they desire a better country", a phrase taken from Hebrews 11:16. The three tiers of the order are Companion, Officer and Member. Specific people may be given extraordinary membership and deserving non-Canadians may receive honorary appointment into each grade.

King Charles III, the reigning Canadian monarch, is the order's sovereign. The governor general administers the order as its Chancellor and Principal Companion. Appointees to the order are recommended by an advisory board and formally inducted by the governor general or the sovereign. Initially awards required the prior approval of the sovereign; however since 1978 the sovereign is only informed of awards after they have been made.

As of January 2026, 8,729 people have been appointed to the order, including scientists, musicians, politicians, artists, athletes, business people, film stars and benefactors. Some have resigned or have been removed from the order, while other appointments have been controversial. Appointees are presented with insignia and receive the right to armorial bearings.

== History ==
The process of founding the Order of Canada began in early 1966 and concluded on 17 April 1967, when the organization was instituted by Queen Elizabeth II, on the advice of the Canadian prime minister, Lester B. Pearson, who was assisted with the establishment of the order by John Matheson. The snowflake design for the order was suggested by the diplomat John G. H. Halstead. The association was officially launched on 1 July 1967, the 100th anniversary of Canadian Confederation, with Governor General Roland Michener being the first inductee to the order, to the level of Companion, and on 7 July of the same year, 90 more people were appointed, including former Governor General Vincent Massey, former prime minister Louis St. Laurent, novelist Hugh MacLennan, religious leader David Bauer, novelist Gabrielle Roy, historian Donald Creighton, feminist politician and future senator Thérèse Casgrain, pioneering neurosurgeon Wilder Penfield, painter Arthur Lismer, public health leader Brock Chisholm, former political leader M. J. Coldwell, disability advocate Edwin Baker, painter Alex Colville, and ice hockey player Maurice Richard. During a visit to London, United Kingdom, later in 1970, Michener presented the Queen with her Sovereign's badge for the Order of Canada, which she first wore during a banquet in Yellowknife in July 1970.

From the Order of Canada grew a Canadian honours system, thereby reducing the use of British honours (i.e. those administered by the Queen in her UK Privy Council). Among the civilian awards of the Canadian honours system, the Order of Canada comes third, after the Cross of Valour and membership in the Order of Merit, which is within the personal gift of Canada's monarch. By the 1980s, Canada's provinces began to develop their own distinct honours and decorations.

Canadian historian Margaret MacMillan represented the order at the coronation of King Charles III and Queen Camilla at Westminster Abbey on 6 May 2023.

== Grades ==
The Canadian monarch, seen as the fount of honour, is at the apex of the Order of Canada as its Sovereign, (Note: In royal proclamations issued by the King or in his name, the order is thus referred to as "Our Order of Canada".) followed by the governor general, who serves as the fellowship's Chancellor. Thereafter follow three grades, which are, in descending order of precedence:

- Companion (French: Compagnon)
- Officer (French: Officier)
- Member (French: Membre)

Additionally, any governor general, viceregal consort, former governor general, former viceregal consort, or member of the Canadian royal family may be appointed as an extraordinary Companion, Officer, or Member. Each incumbent governor general is also installed as the Principal Companion for the duration of his or her time in the viceregal post and continues as an extraordinary Companion thereafter.

Each has an accordant post-nominal letters that members are entitled to use. Promotions in grade are possible, though this is ordinarily not done within five years of the initial appointment, (Note: For example, Denys Arcand was created as an Officer of the Order of Canada on 29 December 1986 and was promoted to Companion on 29 October 2004.) and a maximum of five honorary appointments into any of the three grades may be made by the governor general each year. As of August 2025, there have been 27 honorary appointments. Since 1994, Order of Canada recipients are the only regular citizens who are empowered to administer the Canadian Oath of Citizenship.

=== Grade details ===
Companions of the Order of Canada (post-nominals: CC, in French: Compagnon de l'ordre du Canada) have demonstrated the highest degree of merit to Canada and humanity, on either the national or international scene. Up to 15 Companions are appointed annually, with an imposed limit of 180 living Companions at any given time, not including those appointed as extraordinary Companions or in an honorary capacity. As of August 2017, there are 146 living Companions.

Officers of the Order of Canada (post-nominals: OC, in French: Officier de l'ordre du Canada) have demonstrated an outstanding level of talent and service to Canadians, and up to 64 may be appointed each year, not including those inducted as extraordinary Officers or in an honorary capacity, with no limit to how many may be living at one time. As of August 2017, there were 1,049 living Officers.

Members of the Order of Canada (post-nominals: CM, in French: Membre de l'ordre du Canada) have made an exceptional contribution to Canada or Canadians at a local or regional level, group, field or activity. As many as 136 Members may be appointed annually, not including extraordinary Members and those inducted on an honorary basis, and there is no limit on how many Members may be living at one time. As of August 2017, there were 2,281 living Members.

=== Former grades ===
There were originally, in effect, only two ranks to the Order of Canada: Companion and the Medal of Service. There was, however, also a third award, the Medal of Courage, meant to recognize acts of gallantry. This latter decoration fell in rank between the other two levels, but was anomalous within the Order of Canada, being a separate award of a different nature rather than a middle grade of the order. Without ever having been awarded, the Medal of Courage was on 1 July 1972 replaced by the autonomous Cross of Valour and, at the same time, the levels of Officer and Member were introduced, with all existing holders of the Medal of Service created as Officers. Lester Pearson's vision of a three-tiered structure to the order was thus fulfilled.

== Insignia ==
Ribbon bar
Companion	Officer	Member

Upon admission into the Order of Canada, members are given various insignia of the organization, all designed by Bruce W. Beatty, who "broke new ground in the design of insignia of Orders within The Queen's realms" and was himself made a member of the order in 1990; Beatty attended every investiture ceremony between 1967 and early 2010. The badge belonging to the Sovereign consists of a jewelled, 18-carat gold crown of rubies, emeralds, and sapphires, from which is suspended a white, enamelled, hexagonal snowflake design, with six equal leaves and diamonds between each. At the centre is a disc bearing a maple leaf in pavé-laid rubies on a white enamel background, surrounded at its edge by a red enamel ring (annulus) bearing the motto of the order. The Chancellor wears the badge of a Companion and is, upon installation as governor general, granted a livery collar for wear at Order of Canada investiture ceremonies.

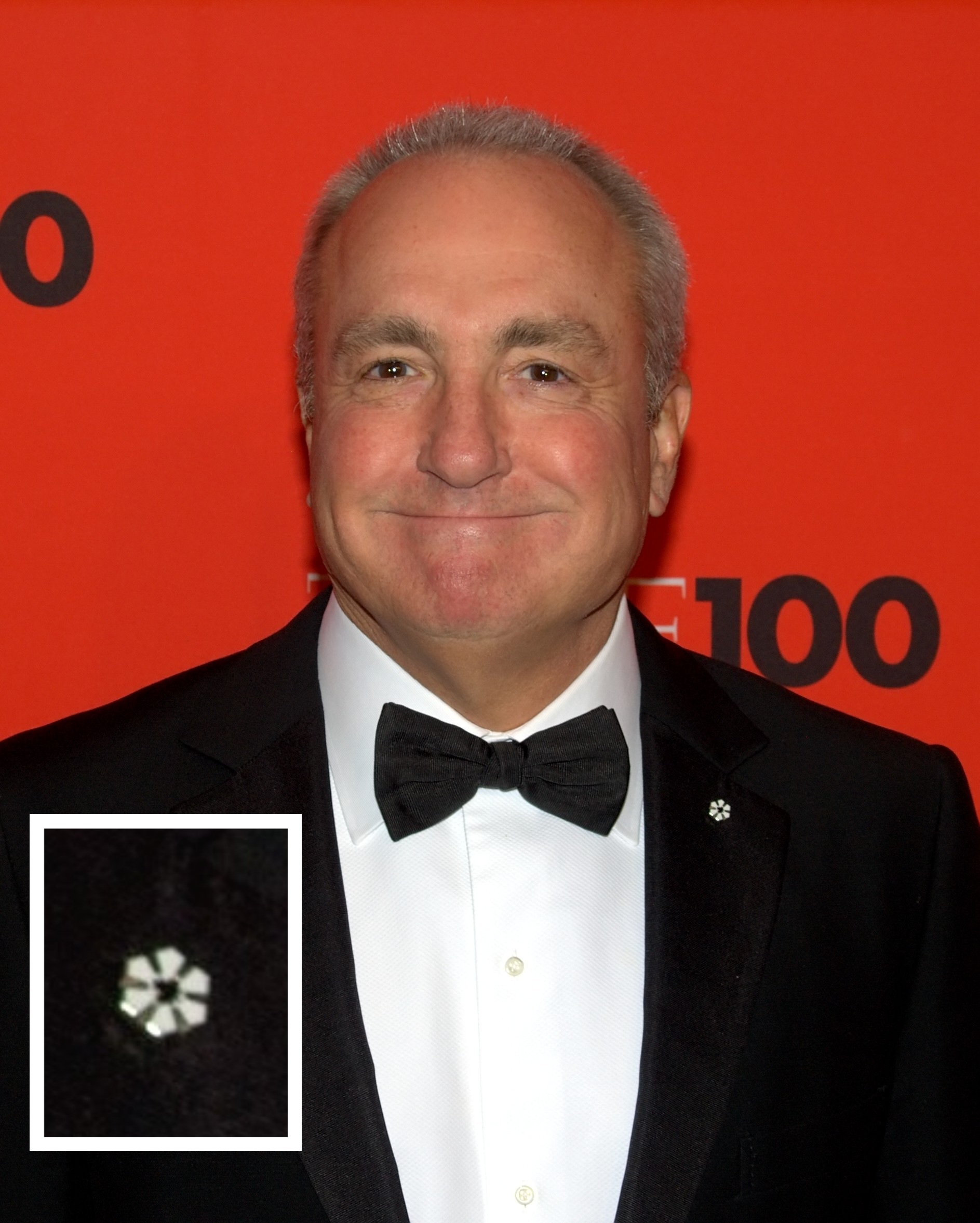
Lorne Michaels in 2010, wearing the lapel pin of a Member (with magnified inset)

The badges for inductees are of a similar design to the Sovereign's badge, though without precious stones, and slight differences for each grade. For Companions, the emblem is gilt with a red enamel maple leaf in the central disk; for Officers, it is gilt with a gold maple leaf; and for Members, both the badge itself and the maple leaf are silver. All are topped by a St. Edward's Crown, symbolizing that the order is headed by the Sovereign, and the reverse is plain except for the word CANADA.

The ribbon is white and bordered in red stripes, similar to the Canadian national flag. The ribbon bar for each grade has the same ribbon and is differentiated by a maple leaf in the centre, the colour of which matches that on the badge of the related grade (red for Companion, gold for Officer and silver for Member). For civilian wear on less formal occasions, a lapel pin may be worn, which is a miniature version of the recipient's badge and thus is distinct for each grade.

Wear of the insignia is according to guidelines issued by the Chancellery of Honours, which stipulate that the badges be worn before most other national orders, that is, at the end of an individual's medal bar closest to the centre of the chest or at the wearer's neck, with only the Victoria Cross, the Cross of Valour, and the badge of the Order of Merit permitted to be worn before the badges of the Order of Canada. Those in the grades of Companion or Officer may wear their badges on a neck ribbon, while those in the Member group display their insignia suspended by a ribbon from a medal bar on the left chest. Protocol originally followed the British tradition, wherein female appointees wore their Order of Canada emblem on a ribbon bow positioned on the left shoulder. These regulations were altered in 1997, and women may wear their insignia in either the traditional manner or in the same fashion as the men.

The coat of arms of David Johnston, former Governor General of Canada and Chancellor and Principal Companion of the Order of Canada, displaying the order's motto and insignia

With the patriation in 1988 of oversight of heraldry from the UK to Canada through the Canadian Heraldic Authority, the constitution of the Order of Canada was amended to include the entitlement of all inductees to petition the Chief Herald of Canada for personal armorial bearings (coats of arms), should they not already possess any. Companions may receive supporters, and all members may have the escutcheon (shield) of their arms encircled with a red ribbon bearing the order's motto in gold, and from which is suspended a rendition of the holder's Order of Canada badge. Queen Elizabeth II, originating Sovereign of the Order of Canada, approved the augmentation of her royal arms for Canada with the order's ribbon in 1987.

On the grant to Bishop's College School, Quebec, the Sovereign's insignia of the Order was depicted below the Royal Arms of Canada, the only time the badge has been incorporated into a grant document.

=== Possession and sale ===
The constitution of the Order of Canada states that the insignia remain property of the Crown, and requires any member of the order to return to the chancellery their original emblem should they be upgraded within the order to a higher rank. Thus, while badges may be passed down as family heirlooms, or loaned or donated for display in museums, they theoretically cannot be sold. However, this has proved impossible to enforce, with several Order of Canada insignia put up for sale over the decades. The first was the Companion's badge of M. J. Coldwell, who was appointed in 1967; his badge was sold at auction in 1981, an act that received criticism from government officials.

In 2007, it was revealed that one of the first ever issued insignia of the Order of Canada, a Medal of Service awarded originally to Quebec historian Gustave Lanctot, was put up for sale via e-mail. Originally, the anonymous auctioneer, who had purchased the decoration for $45 at an estate sale in Montreal, attempted to sell the insignia on eBay; however, after the bidding reached $15,000, eBay removed the item, citing its policy against the sale of government property, including "any die, seal or stamp provided by, belonging to, or used by a government department, diplomatic or military authority appointed by or acting under the authority of Her Majesty." Rideau Hall stated that selling medals was "highly discouraged"; however, the owner continued efforts to sell the insignia via the internet. Five years later, a miniature insignia presented to Tommy Douglas was put on auction in Ontario as part of a larger collection of Douglas artifacts. Douglas's daughter, Shirley Douglas, purchased the set for $20,000.

== Eligibility and appointment ==
Elizabeth II, Queen of Canada and Sovereign of the Order of Canada, invests Jules Léger as a Companion of the order at Rideau Hall, August 1973.

Any of the three levels of the Order of Canada are open to all living Canadian citizens, except all federal and provincial politicians and judges while they hold office. The order recognizes the achievement of outstanding merit or distinguished service by Canadians who made a major difference to Canada through lifelong contributions in every field of endeavour, as well as the efforts made by non-Canadians who have made the world better by their actions. Membership is thus accorded to those who exemplify the order's Latin motto, taken from Hebrews 11:16 of the Christian Bible, desiderantes meliorem patriam, meaning "they desire a better country." Each of the six to eight hundred nominations submitted each year, by any person or organization, is received by the order's Advisory Council, which, along with the governor general, makes the final choice of new inductees, typically by consensus rather than a vote; a process that, when conceived, was the first of its kind in the world. Appointees are then accepted into the organization at an investiture ceremony typically conducted by the governor general at Rideau Hall, although the monarch or a provincial viceroy may perform the task, and the ceremony may take place in other locations. Since the 1991 investiture of Ted Rogers, Order of Canada installment ceremonies have been broadcast on various television channels and the Internet; recipients are given a complimentary video recording of their investiture ceremony from Rogers Cable.

At certain periods, holders of the order were presented with other awards, usually commemorative medals. Thus far, two commemoratives have been given automatically to every living member of the Order of Canada: the Queen Elizabeth II Silver Jubilee Medal in 1977 and the Queen Elizabeth II Diamond Jubilee Medal in 2012.

=== Advisory council ===
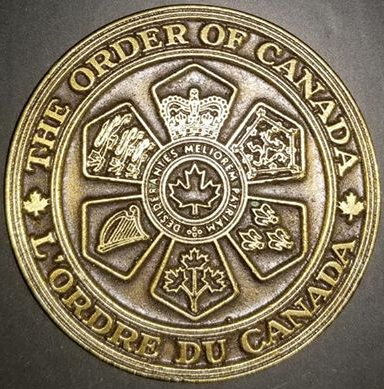
Seal of the Order of Canada

The task of the order's advisory council is to evaluate the nominations of potential inductees, decide if the candidates are worthy enough to be accepted into the order, and make recommendations to the governor general, who appoints the new members. The council is chaired by the chief justice of Canada, and includes the clerk of the Privy Council, the deputy minister of Canadian Heritage, the chair of the Canada Council for the Arts, the president of the Royal Society of Canada, the chair of the Association of Universities and Colleges of Canada, and five members of the order who sit on the council for a three-year period. If a nomination involves a non-Canadian citizen, the deputy minister of Foreign Affairs is invited by the Advisory Council to offer evaluation. Decisions of the council and new appointments to and dismissals from the Order of Canada are announced through the Canada Gazette.

As of December 2025, the members of the advisory council are:

- Richard Wagner, Chief Justice of Canada (Chair)
- Marie Yvonne Delorme
- Stephanie Dixon
- Alain-G. Gagnon, President of the Royal Society of Canada
- Daniel Germain
- Cheryl Hickman, Chair of the Board, Canada Council for the Arts
- Karina LeBlanc
- Patricia Livingston
- Isabelle Mondou, Deputy Minister of the Department of Canadian Heritage
- Michael Sabia, Clerk of the Privy Council and Secretary to the Cabinet
- Deep Saini, Chair of Universities Canada and President & Vice-Chancellor of McGill University
- P. Kim Sturgess

=== Refusal ===
Few have declined entry into the Order of Canada; in the first 30 years of the order's existence, by 1997, 1.5 per cent of offered appointments to the order had been refused. The identities of those individuals who have declined induction since the 1970s are kept confidential, so the full list is not publicly known. Some, however, have spoken openly about their decisions, including Robert Weaver, who stated that he was critical of the "three-tier" nature of the order; Claude Ryan and Morley Callaghan, who both declined the honour in 1967; Mordecai Richler, who twice declined; and Marcel Dubé, Roger Lemelin and Glenn Gould, who all declined in 1970. However, all the above individuals, save for Gould, later did accept appointment into the order. Others have rejected appointment on the basis of being supporters of the Quebec sovereignty movement, such as Luc-André Godbout, Rina Lasnier and Geneviève Bujold, while Alice Parizeau, another supporter of Quebec sovereignty, was criticized for accepting entry into the order despite her beliefs.

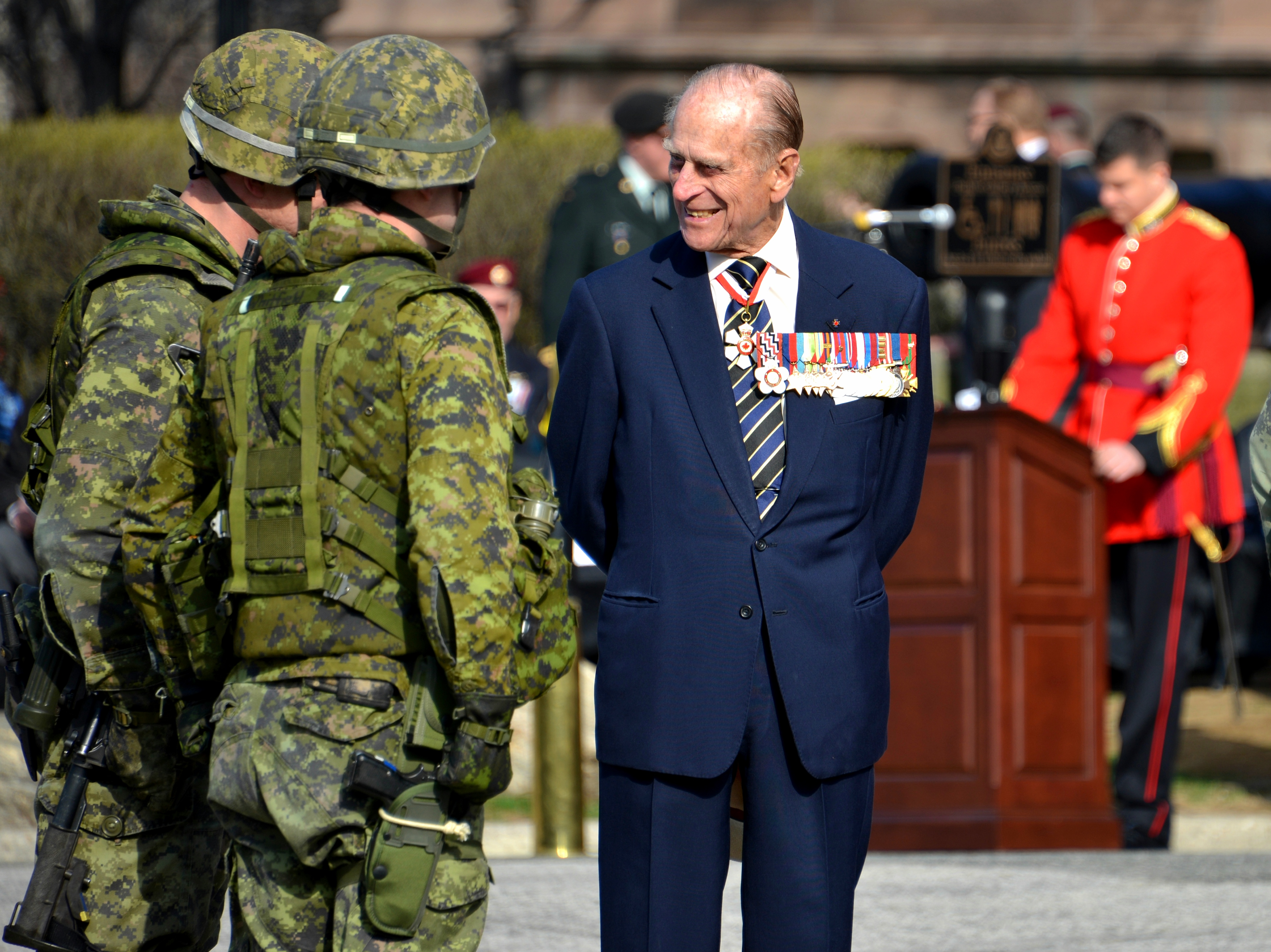
Prince Philip, Duke of Edinburgh, wearing at the neck the insignia of a Companion of the Order of Canada. Philip originally declined an honorary appointment to the Order of Canada, feeling the offer implied he was a foreigner to Canada. In April 2013, he accepted appointment as the first extraordinary Companion.

Victoria Cross recipient Cecil Meritt cited the fact that he already held Canada's highest decoration as a reason not to be admitted to the Order of Canada. Prince Philip, Duke of Edinburgh, was in 1982 offered appointment to the order as an honorary Companion; however, he refused on the grounds that, as the consort of the Queen, he was a Canadian and thus entitled to a substantive appointment. In 1993, the Advisory Council proposed an amendment to the constitution of the Order of Canada, making the monarch's spouse automatically a Companion, but Prince Philip again refused, stating that if he was to be appointed, it should be on his merits. Congruent with these arguments, he in 1988 accepted without issue a substantive induction as a Companion of the Order of Australia. In 2013, the constitution of the Order of Canada was amended in a way that permitted the substantive appointment of Royal Family members and Prince Philip accepted induction as the first extraordinary Companion of the Order of Canada on 26 April 2013. Former Premier of Newfoundland Joseph Smallwood declined appointment as a Companion because he felt that, as a self-proclaimed Father of Confederation, he deserved a knighthood. Smallwood was never knighted and later accepted induction as a Companion.

=== Resignation and removal ===
Resignations from the order can take place only through prescribed channels, which include the member submitting to the Secretary General of the Order of Canada a letter notifying the chancellery of his or her desire to terminate their membership, and only with the governor general's approval can the resignation take effect. On 1 June 2009, the governor general accepted the resignations of astronomer and inventor René Racine, pianist Jacqueline Richard, and Cardinal Jean-Claude Turcotte; on 11 January 2010, the same was done for Renato Giuseppe Bosisio, an engineering professor, and Father Lucien Larré; and on 19 April 2010 for Frank Chauvin. It was also reported that other constituents of the Order of Canada had, in reaction to Henry Morgentaler's induction into their ranks, indicated that they would return or had returned their emblems in protest, including organizations such as the Missionary Oblates of Mary Immaculate and Madonna House Apostolate doing so on behalf of deceased former members.

Members may be removed from the order if the Advisory Council feels their actions have brought the order into disrepute. In order for this to be done, the council must agree to take action and then send a letter to the person both telling of the group's decision and requesting a response. Anyone removed from the order is required to return their insignia. As of February 2025, nine people have been removed from the Order of Canada: Alan Eagleson, who was dismissed after being jailed for fraud in 1998; David Ahenakew, who faced calls for his removal due to antisemitic comments he made in 2002; T. Sher Singh, after the Law Society of Upper Canada found him guilty of professional misconduct and revoked his licence to practise law; Steve Fonyo, due to "his multiple criminal convictions, for which there are no outstanding appeals"; Garth Drabinsky, who was found guilty of fraud and forgery in Ontario and has been a fugitive from American law for related crimes; Conrad Black, who was convicted in the United States in 2007 of fraud and obstruction of justice; Ranjit Chandra, whose scientific work was discredited by allegations of fraud; Johnny Issaluk, following allegations of sexual misconduct; and Buffy Sainte-Marie, after her claims of Indigenous ancestry were reported to be inconsistent with publicly available documents. In 2013, Norman Barwin resigned from the order as a result of the Advisory Council moving forward with his pending removal due to his being found guilty of professional misconduct.

The Order's Advisory Council considered a request made in 2021 for the expulsion of Julie Payette, the 29th Governor General of Canada, from the order. Payette, an Extraordinary Companion, resigned from the viceregal post over allegations of harassment of personnel at Rideau Hall.

=== Controversial appointments ===
The advisory board attempts to remain apolitical and pragmatic in its approach to selecting new members of the Order of Canada, generally operating without input from ministers of the Crown; political interference has occurred only once, when in 1978 Paul Desmarais's investiture was delayed for six months by Prime Minister Pierre Trudeau. However, some of the committee's selections have caused controversy. For instance, the admission in 2001 of sex educator Sue Johanson, host of the long-running Sunday Night Sex Show, as a Member stirred controversy among some of Canada's Christian organizations, as Johanson had taught teenagers methods of safe sex alongside abstinence. Similarly, the acceptance of birth control advocate Elizabeth Bagshaw and gay rights campaigner Brent Hawkes also incited debate.

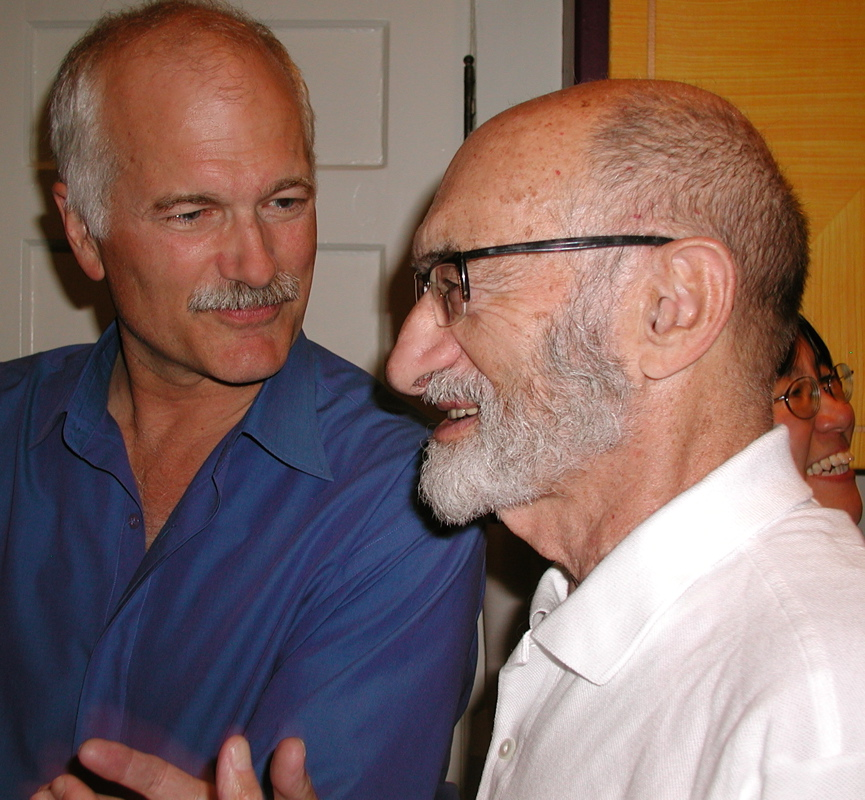
Henry Morgentaler (right), with Jack Layton (left); Morgentaler's appointment was one of the most controversial in the history of the Order of Canada.

Abortion-rights activist Henry Morgentaler's appointment to the order on 1 July 2008 not only marked the first time the Advisory Council had not been unanimous in its decision, but also proved to be one of the most controversial appointments in the order's history. Opponents of Morgentaler's abortion activism organized protests outside of Rideau Hall on 9 July, while compatriots did the same in front of Government House in St. John's, Newfoundland and Labrador, the official residence of that province's lieutenant governor.

One former police detective, Frank Chauvin, along with a Catholic anti-abortion activist, filed suit against the Order of Canada Advisory Council, demanding that the minutes of the meeting relating to Morgentaler be made public. The appointment of Morgentaler prompted former Liberal Member of Parliament (MP) Clifford Lincoln to write that the workings of the Advisory Council were "mysterious", citing what he theorized to be inbuilt partiality and conflict of interest as reasons why Margaret Somerville, whom Lincoln had twice nominated to the Advisory Council, was turned down for appointment, yet Morgentaler was accepted. Journalist Henry Aubin in the Montreal Gazette opined that the council's rejection of Somerville, her personal opposition to same-sex marriage, and the acceptance of Brent Hawkes, Jane Rule, and Jean Chrétien, all regarded as supporting same-sex unions, as well as the appointment of a controversial figure such as Morgentaler, were all signs that the Advisory Council operated with partisan bias. Aubin also pointed to the presence on the council of members of the Royal Society of Canada, an organization into which Somerville was received.

Peter Savaryn, a member of the Waffen-SS Galician Division, was awarded the Order of Canada in 1987, for which Governor General of Canada Mary Simon expressed "deep regret" in 2023.

== Proposed amendments ==
At a 2006 conference on Commonwealth honours, Christopher McCreery, an expert on Canada's honours, raised the concern that the three grades of the Order of Canada were insufficient to recognize the nation's very best; one suggestion was to add two more levels to the order, equivalent to knighthoods in British orders. The order of precedence also came under scrutiny, particularly the anomaly that all three grades of the Order of Canada supersede the top levels of each of the other orders (except the Order of Merit), contrary to international practice.

In June 2010, McCreery suggested reforms to the Order of Canada that would avert the awkwardness around appointing members of the Canadian royal family as full members of the order: He theorized that the Queen, as the order's Sovereign, could simply appoint, on ministerial advice, anyone as an extra member, or the monarch could issue an ordinance allowing for her relations to be made regular members when approved. Similarly, McCreery proposed that a new division of the order could be established specifically for governors general, their spouses, and members of the royal family, a version of which was adopted in 2013.

== See also ==
- List of companions of the Order of Canada
- Canadian order of precedence (decorations and medals)

== Citations ==
- Chancellery of Honours (September 2005), Wearing of Orders, Decorations and Medals (PDF), Queen's Printer for Canada, archived from the original (PDF) on 2 December 2007
- Department of National Defence (26 March 2009), "18" ( (PDF)), Queen's Regulations and Orders for the Canadian Forces, vol. 1, Queen's Printer for Canada, 18.01, archived from the original on 6 July 2011
- Elizabeth II (2013), The Constitution of the Order of Canada, Queen's Printer for Canada
- McCreery, Christopher (2005), The Order of Canada: Its Origins, History and Development, University of Toronto Press, ISBN 978-0-8020-3940-8
- McCreery, Christopher (2010), The Crown and Honours: Getting it Right (PDF), Queen's University Press, archived from the original (PDF) on 9 October 2021
- Office of the Governor General of Canada (24 August 2017), Honours > Order of Canada > Search: Order of Canada Membership List > Honour Received: Order of Canada; Field: Both Living and Deceased
