= Women's liberation movement in North America =

20th-century feminist movement

- Part of the Women's liberation movement
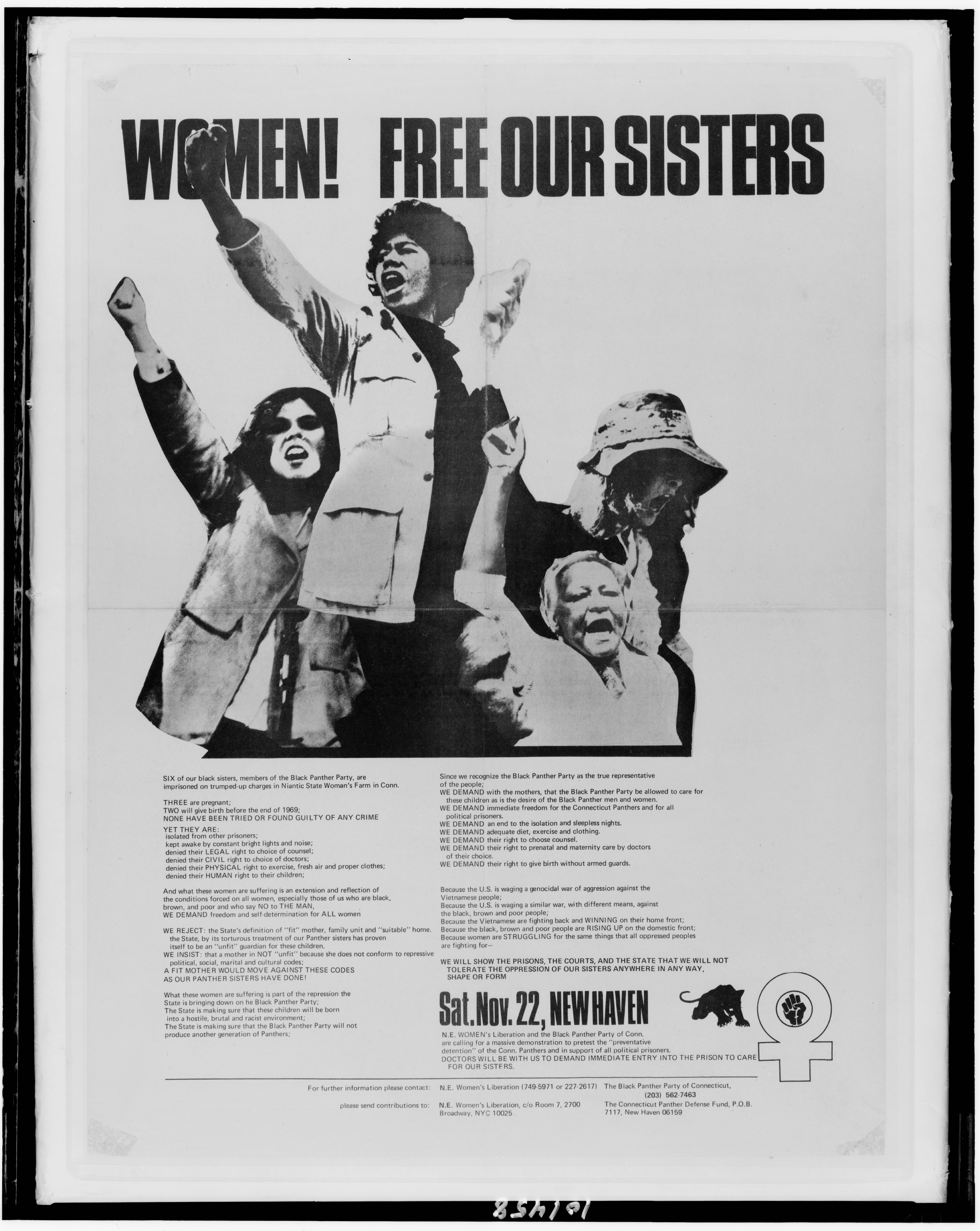
- Poster showing four women demonstrating for release of six members of the Black Panther Party from the Niantic State Women's Farm in Connecticut 1972
- Date: Late 1960s - 1980s
- Location: North America
- Caused by: Institutional sexism
- Goals: Total equal rights for women
- Methods: Consciousness raising; Protest; Reform

The women's liberation movement in North America was part of the feminist movement in the late 1960s and through the 1980s. Derived from the civil rights movement, student movement and anti-war movements, the Women's Liberation Movement took rhetoric from the civil rights idea of liberating victims of discrimination from oppression. They were not interested in reforming existing social structures, but instead were focused on changing the perceptions of women's place in society and the family and women's autonomy. Rejecting hierarchical structure, most groups which formed operated as collectives where all women could participate equally. Typically, groups associated with the Women's Liberation Movement held consciousness-raising meetings where women could voice their concerns and experiences, learning to politicize their issues. To members of the WLM rejecting sexism was the most important objective in eliminating women's status as second-class citizens.

In North America, the movement began in the United States and Canada almost simultaneously with the first articles articulating their aims appearing around 1965. By 1967, organizations had formed in major US and Canadian cities spreading within a year throughout both countries. In Mexico, sparked by the movement in the north, groups began to form in 1971. Characterized as man-haters and radicals, the movement in North America gave way to more liberal reformers by the mid-1970s in the United States and Canada and by the early 1980s in Mexico.

== Canada ==
The Women's Liberation Movement in Canada derived from the anti-war movement, Native Rights Movement and the New Left student movement of the 1960s. An increase in university enrollment, sparked by the post-World War II baby boom, created a student body which believed that they could be catalysts for social change. Rejecting authority and espousing participatory democracy as well as direct action, they promoted a wide agenda including civil rights, ethnic empowerment, and peace, as well as gay and women's liberation. The Canadian magazine, Chatelaine serialized Betty Friedan's The Feminine Mystique and published articles on birth control, modifications needed for the divorce laws, and other women's issues, making them public concerns. Institutionalized feminists, (liberal feminism) focused efforts on forming a royal commission to evaluate women's status and address them through reforms, but grass-roots feminists desired more radical change.

As early as 1967, women in Toronto had formed a Women's Liberation Group and in July 1968, a group of women students at Simon Fraser University (SFU) organized the Feminine Action League (FAL). Faculty, like Margaret Benston supported Women's Lib encouraging studies to gain an understanding of women's societal roles and the perception of women's place both by themselves and by men. In that year, the U.S. organization SNCC barred whites from participating in leadership positions, influencing the founders of FAL to ban men in their organization. Though often depicted in media as a sign of "man-hating", separation was a focused attempt to eliminate defining women via their relationship to men. Since women's inequality as child-rearers, citizens, sexual objects, wives, workers, etc. were commonly experienced by women, separation meant unity of purpose to evaluate their second-class status. Politicizing personal issues was done in consciousness-raising sessions aimed at eliminating the need to rally support for abstract causes, because the issues were those impacting women's daily lives. Soon after their forming, the group changed their name to the SFU Women's Caucus and initially focused on contraception and pregnancy prevention for students. In July 1969, the group moved off-campus, to downtown Vancouver, opening offices as the Vancouver Women's Caucus (VWC). They began publishing a newspaper, Pedestal, focused on women's liberation and protesting sexist hierarchy and male-domination in the student movement. Women's Caucuses also formed at the University of Alberta and the University of Regina, as offshoots of the Students for a Democratic Union (SDU) and at the University of Toronto aligned with the Student Union for Peace Action (SUPA). As in the U.S. a network of women's centers, which included spaces like the Ste-Famille Women's Centre in Montreal and the Prince George Women's Centre in northern British Columbia developed to facilitate meetings of women and provide them with services.

WLM groups sprang up throughout Canada, though in Quebec there was a struggle over whether women's liberation or Québécois liberation should be the focus for women radicals. Advocating public self-expression, such as participating in protests and sit-ins, organizations affiliated with the movement tended to operate on a consensus-based structure and participated in consciousness-raising, like their U.S. counterparts. However, Canadian Women's Lib groups typically incorporated a class-based component into their theory of oppression which was mostly missing from U.S. liberation theory. For example, Frances Wasserlein, a prominent LGBT and feminist activist who chronicled the history of the Abortion Caravan, argued that to be involved in the WLM in Vancouver equated to being a socialist. Some of the first actions of the VWC were to protest discriminatory hiring and wage practices of the Civil Service Commission against women. Other direct actions included the occupation of a building on the University of Toronto campus by the Toronto Women Liberation Movement. Having tried to negotiate with the university to establish day care centers and failing in their efforts, they took over a university-owned house, cleared out the squatters, and renovated it for their children.

In response to the passage of a reform to the civil code on abortions in 1969, the VWC began a series of protests focused on abortion. Marge Hollibaugh and other liberationists organized the Western Regional Conference on Women's Liberation, which was held during the Thanksgiving weekend at the University of British Columbia campus to spread the word about the upcoming caravan. Betsy Wood organized a guerrilla theatre performance on Valentine's Day 1970 at the Vancouver Courthouse to illustrate the inequalities which could emerge from allowing Therapeutic Abortion Committees to make decisions for women and the consequences of denying procedures which could be suicide or back-alley abortions. It was also Wood's idea to organize the caravan, which she had proposed at the October conference. Members of the VWC left Vancouver on 27 April performing guerrilla theatre along the way. They reached Ottawa on 9 May and assembled with other WLM groups from throughout Canada at Parliament Hill. Over the next three days, they managed to stage a protest at the home of the Prime Minister and disrupt the House of Commons, shutting it down for the first time in history.

In Quebec, 1969 was also pivotal, with the establishment of the Women's Liberation Front (French: Le Front de libération des femmes (FLF)). Their slogan was "Pas de libération des femmes sans libération du Québec! Pas de libération du Québec sans libération des femmes!" (No liberation of women without liberation of Quebec! No liberation of Quebec without women's liberation!) and they supported changes to gain socio-economic and political equality, but also pressed for Quebec's autonomy and a recognition of the unpaid labor of women working in the home and in family businesses. One of their first demonstrations was against the prohibition of public protests put forth by the administration of Montreal's mayor, Jean Drapeau. In 1970, Nicole Thérien and Louise Toupin set forth a manifesto proclaiming that in a society defined by exploiters and the exploited, woman and Québécois citizens were slaves of the exploited. That same year the FLF founded a newspaper called Québécoise deboytte! (Quebec women standing up!) in protest to mainstream media's curtailment of women's voices.

In November 1970 the first national conference of the WLM was held in Saskatoon. Marlene Dixon, a sociology professor teaching at McGill University debunked the idea of an autonomous women's movement, encouraging women to join extant movements fighting racism and classism. The radical movement in Canada was shaped by these opposing views of whether women could gain equality within the existing socio-economic/political system or whether capitalism had to be overturned to create human equality. In 1973, Rosemary Brown, the first Black Canadian woman elected to a provincial legislature in the country, spoke at the national congress of the Canadian Negro Women's Association. She embraced the ideas of the WLM and rejected the idea that black women were needed in the struggle for black men to achieve equality. Rather than being an anti-male position, she believed that black men were not weak and in need of women propping them up. She saw the movement as one which validated the human import of males and females.

In 1971, Lisa Balcer, called as a witness for the trial of Paul Rose in the kidnappings perpetrated by the Quebec Liberation Front the previous year, refused to testify because women were not allowed to serve as jurors. She was declared to be in contempt of court. Seven women from the courtroom who were members of the FLF stood and protested legal discrimination of women. All seven were arrested and served from one to two months in jail, but their action brought attention to the problems of inequality. A few months after their protest, women gained the right to serve as jurors in Quebec.

By the late 1970s, the Marxist and liberationists' alliance fractured in part because of media characterization of radicals in the grass-roots movement as "crazy", but in part because the radical grass-roots groups had difficulty mobilizing women under abstract theories. Bonnie Kreps, who wrote "Radical Feminism 1" which was published in 1973 in the anthology Radical Feminism: The Book portrayed Canadian feminists as falling into three categories: socialist feminists, who were opposed to capitalism; liberal feminists, who were concerned with equal rights and equal pay; and radical feminists who focused on "the oppression of women as women" or sexism. Activists who had been involved in the WLM turned their efforts toward violence against women, when the liberal feminists gained the dominant position and public perception that legal change to the existing systems were the legitimate concerns of the women's movement. In 2007, Marjolaine Péloquin, published a history of the movement in Quebec, En prison pour la cause des femmes: la conquête du banc des jurés (In prison for the cause of women: the conquest of the jury box), critically analyzing the short-lived but significant impact of the FLF.

== United States ==
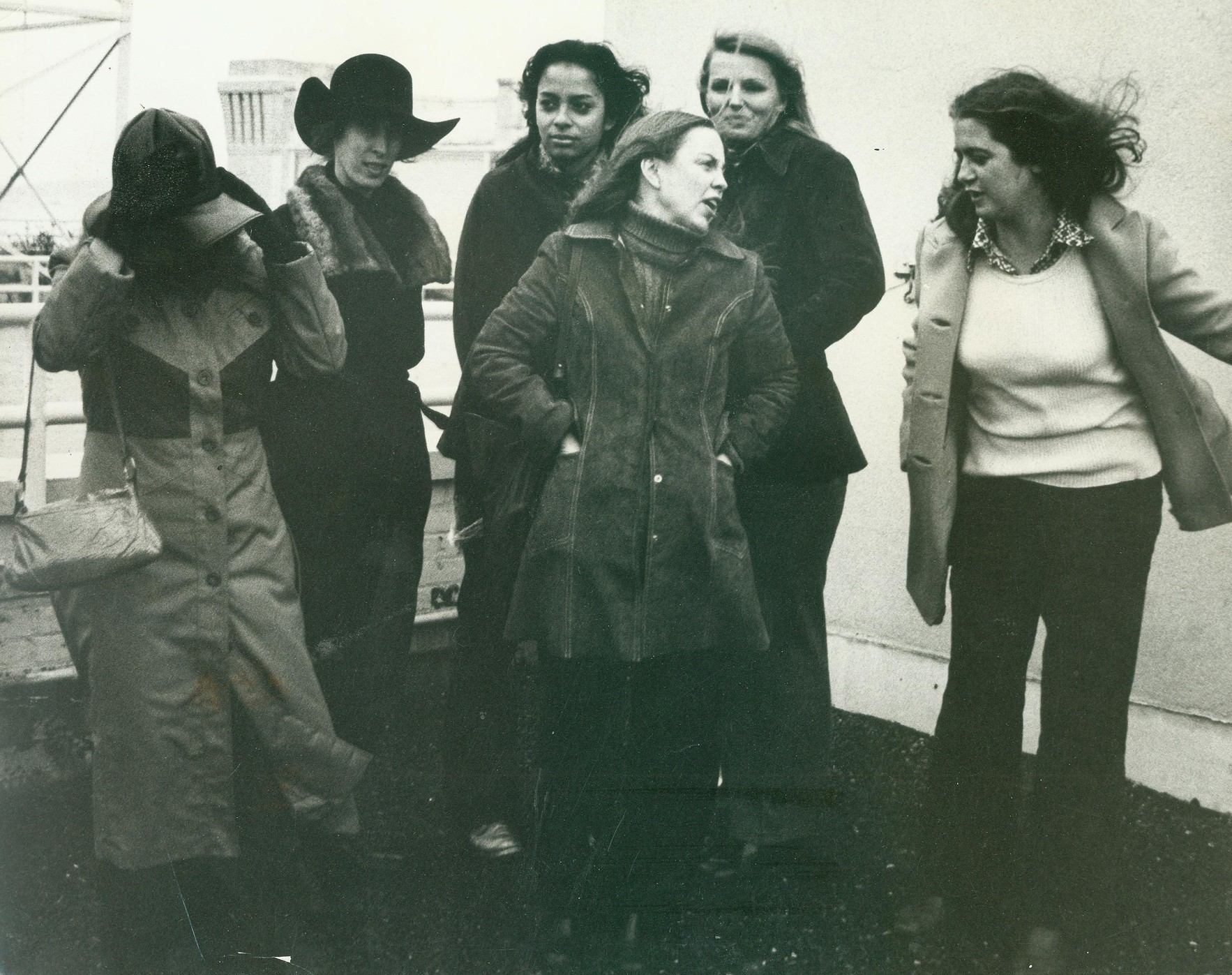
Westbeth Playwrights Feminist Collective on roof of Westbeth in NYC 1971

Just as the Women's Suffrage movement grew out of the Abolition Movement, the Women's Liberation Movement grew out of the struggle for civil rights. Though challenging patriarchy and the anti-patriarchal message of the Women's Liberation Movement was considered radical, it was not the only, nor the first, radical movement in the early period of second-wave feminism. Rather than simply desiring legal equality, members believed that the moral and social climate in the United States needed to change. Though most groups operated independently—there was no national umbrella organization—there were unifying philosophies of women participating in the movement. Challenging patriarchy and the hierarchical organization of society which defined women as subordinate, participants in the movement believed that women should be free to define their own individual identity as part of human society. One of the reasons that women who supported the movement chose not to create a single approach to addressing the problem of women being treated as second-class citizens was that they did not want to foster an idea that anyone was an expert or that any one group or idea could address all of the societal problems women faced. They also wanted women, whose voices had been silenced to be able to express their own views on solutions. Among the issues were the objectification of women, reproductive rights, opportunities for women in the workplace, redefining familial roles. A dilemma faced by movement members was how they could challenge the definition of femininity without compromising the principals of feminism.

The publication of The Feminine Mystique by Friedan pointed to the dissatisfaction of many women in American society and was seen as a catalyst for the movement, though after she co-founded the National Organization for Women (NOW) in 1966, Friedan was seen by radicals as too mainstream. NOW's stated purpose was to work within established social and legal systems to gain equality, which clashed with radical feminists who believed that traditional power-structures had failed women and needed to be reformed. In 1964, an anonymous paper (later revealed to have been written by Elaine Delott Baker, Casey Hayden, Mary King, and Emmie Schrader), "The Position of Women in SNCC" (the Student Nonviolent Coordinating Committee) was presented by Ruby Doris Smith-Robinson at the Waveland conference. The paper discussed the analogous relationship between sex and race discrimination within the context of the work environment and was seen as a critically important document for evaluating gender and women's issues. Stokely Carmichael's response to the paper, "The only position for women in SNCC is prone", has been taken by some to have been condescending, but Carol Giardina argued in her work Freedom for Women: Forging the Women's Liberation Movement that the statement was made jokingly and that focus on the controversy about Carmichael's remark deflects the positive reinforcement and leadership opportunities that many women found within the SNCC.

Between 1965 and 1966 meetings, at which papers and conversations about women's place in society were discussed, became more prevalent. An article published in Random, a Canadian journal, advocated that women should participate in self-examination without male scrutiny or advice to embark on their own path of self-discovery. In the summer of 1967 at the Students for a Democratic Society’s national conference, a manifesto drafted by the Women’s Liberation Workshop defined the relationship of women to men as one that a colonial power had toward its colonies. The document demanded that men take responsibility for their male chauvinism and that women demand full participation in all activities of the organization. Following the meeting, women's groups such as the Bread and Roses in Boston and Women's Liberation Group of Berkeley were founded. In Chicago, at a women's workshop held over Labor Day weekend that same year during the National Conference of New Politics (NCNP), Jo Freeman and Shulamith Firestone presented demands from the woman's caucus to the plenary session. The moderator advised that the points of their resolution were insignificant and did not merit discussion on the floor. Over their protests and refusing to discuss the demands further, NCNP Director William F. Pepper moved the topic toward a discussion of Native Americans, but agreed to tack on their concerns to the end of the agenda. Dismissively, Pepper patted Firestone on the head and said, "Move on little girl; we have more important issues to talk about here than women's liberation", or possibly, "Cool down, little girl. We have more important things to talk about than women's problems."

Soon after the meeting Freeman, Heather Booth, and Naomi Weisstein founded the Women's Radical Action Project (WRAP), as a vehicle for consciousness-raising. At these meetings, women met regularly to discuss personal dilemmas and to analyze how politics shaped and impacted women's lives. Consciousness-raising discussions were wide-ranging from intimate relationships to social justice issues, with participants stressing the importance of not only having choices but being free to make them. Their discussions recognized that legislation could not change many of the issues which confronted women, but that education and redefining societal roles would be required to change attitudes and mores. Within six months, the voice of women's liberation began publication by Freeman as the first radical newspaper of the movement. Firestone left the Chicago conference and returned to New York to found the New York Radical Women (NYRW) with Pamela Allen, among others. It was the "first women's liberation group in New York City", and followed a radical feminist ideology that declared that "the personal is political" and "sisterhood is powerful"—formulations that arose from these consciousness-raising sessions.

Within the year, women's liberation groups sprang up all over America. In 1968, the first American national gathering of women's liberation activists was held in Lake Villa, a suburb of Chicago, Illinois. That same year, at the University of Washington, a Students for a Democratic Society (SDS) organizer reflected on a meeting about white college men working with poor white men, and "noted that sometimes after analyzing societal ills, the men shared leisure time by 'balling a chick together.' He pointed out that such activities did much to enhance the political consciousness of poor white youth. A woman in the audience asked, 'And what did it do for the consciousness of the chick?'" After the meeting, a handful of women formed Seattle's first women's liberation group. In June 1968, Notes from the First Year, containing essays, speeches and transcripts of consciousness-raising sessions was distributed by the NYRW. The mimeographed booklet, which covered topics on sex, including abortion and orgasm, became the "most circulated source material on the New York women's liberation movement".

Liberationists gained nationwide attention when they protested the Miss America beauty pageant on 7 September 1968. Though cameramen were prohibited from showing the protesters on television, newspapers headlined the story the following day. Because the pageant promoted beauty as the ideal for measuring women's worth, NYRW activists targeted the iconic event. Gathering items they considered to be objects of female oppression, such as bras, curlers, typing textbooks and copies of Ladies' Home Journal, among other items, the activists intended to set fire to the trash cans containing them. They were prohibited from doing so, but the myth of "bra-burning", led to liberationists being called "bra-burners". By 1969, NYRW had split into two factions—politicos and feminists, dividing over whether the oppressor of women was the political and economic system or whether it was patriarchy. Politicos, who were tired of being labeled as man-haters and who believed the capitalist system was the root of the problem, formed the Women's International Terrorist Conspiracy from Hell (W.I.T.C.H), which focused on achieving equality through leftist politics. Feminists, who remained committed to fighting sexism, formed the Redstockings.

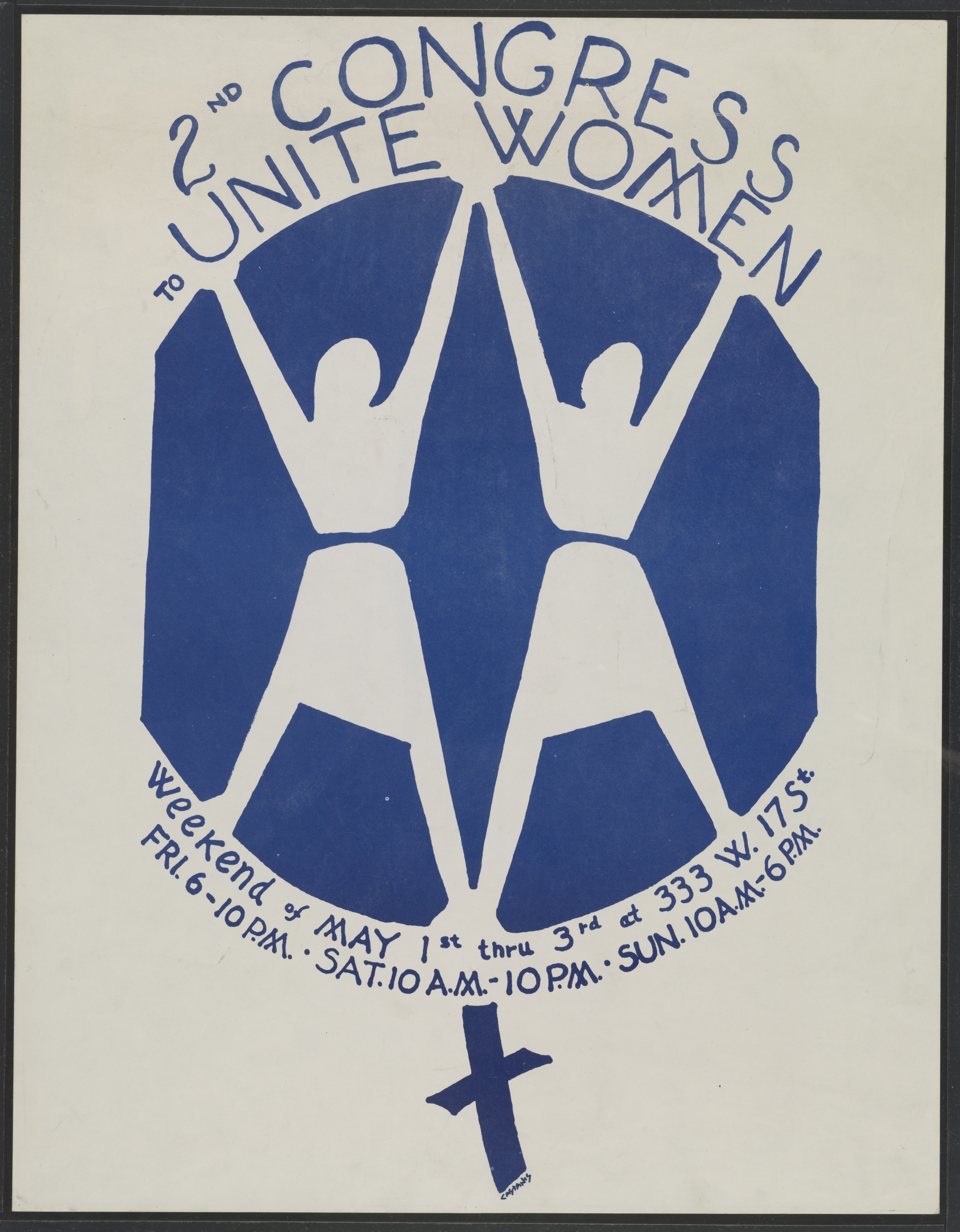
Poster for the Second Congress to Unite Women in 1970

The split did not slow activity down. W.I.T.C.H. protested the 1969 Miss America pageant and the Redstockings demonstrated at a hearing of the New York State Joint Legislative Committee considering a reform of abortion law. Angered that of the 15 experts called, 14 were men, the group held their own "public hearings" at the Washington Square Methodist Episcopal Church, allowing only women to "testify". By 1969, Women's Liberation was being featured in national magazines, like Life, Newsweek and Time. Vernita Gray, along with Michelle Brody, E. Kitch Child, Margaret E. Sloan and other women formed a group called the Women's Caucus of the Chicago Gay Liberation in 1969. Within a year, the multi-racial group, renamed the Chicago Lesbian Liberation (CLL), had established regular consciousness-raising events, known as "Monday Night Meetings". That same year, at a NOW meeting, Friedan, who feared feminists being associated with lesbians, referred to lesbian activists within the movement as the "lavender menace". Subsequently, Susan Brownmiller wrote an article for The New York Times Magazine describing the perceived threat to the movement. Lesbian activists responded by embracing the term, staging a protest at the Second Congress to Unite Women held in 1970, in which they revealed lavender t-shirts emblazoned with the term. Groups such as Columbia Women's Liberation, Daughters of Bilitis (which was a member of NOW) and RadicaLesbian pushed the drive for women to gain autonomy.

1969 was a pivotal year, in that it marked the beginning of mainstream incorporation of the liberationsists' focus on sexism. Gloria Steinem, a member of NOW, wrote an article for New York magazine, After Black Power, Women's Liberation, which was recognized with the Penney-Missouri Journalism Award as one of the first treatments of the women's movement. The Female Liberation Newsletter, was founded that same year by Julie Morse and Rosina Richter in Minnesota, with the intent of centralizing publications on the varying views of the movement in the Minneapolis–Saint Paul metro area. By 1970, they had formed the Amazon Bookstore Cooperative, hoping to provide a physical space for women-centered dialogue. Influential texts written by liberationists and published in 1970 included The Myth of the Vaginal Orgasm by Anne Koedt, The Political Economy of Women's Liberation by Margaret Benston, The Politics of Housework by Pat Mainardi, Sexual Politics by Kate Millett, and Sisterhood Is Powerful, An Anthology of Writings from the Women's Liberation Movement edited by Robin Morgan By early 1970, "Women's Lib" was featured as a cover story in Saturday Review written by Lucy Komisar, vice president of NOW. Atlantic Monthly and Mademoiselle devoted sections to the subject, some of which were written by feminists. Brownmiller, a member of New York Radical Feminists, wrote one of the articles in the February Mademoiselle issue and followed it up with an article in March, published in the New York Times Magazine. Network news followed print media in a rush to cover the "story of the year".

CBS was the first major network to cover women's liberation when it aired coverage on 15 January 1970 of the D.C. Women's Liberation group's disruption of Senate hearings on birth control as a small item in their broadcast. Within a week, the women's protests became leading stories on both CBS and ABC. Early stories focused on behavior, rather than motivations, but NBC broke with the tradition when it aired a story on 23 January evaluating the underlying causes of concern were that the side-effects of the pill had not disclosed safety hazards. In March, CBS televised a series, with all-male correspondents, focused on radicals in the feminist movement, highlighting liberationists' tactics, rather than their underlying issues and portraying sexism as an unsubstantiated claim, which should be treated with skepticism. It was followed by a 6-part series broadcast by NBC anchored by four women, who presented an analysis of the issues with sexual discrimination portrayed as a reality in women's lives. These various treatments, served to undermine the radical message, as on the one hand they were portrayed as extremists and on the other, their sexual politics were assimilated into the mainstream liberal feminist view to present a unified vision for women's equality. In May Marlene Sanders, a member of NOW and one of the two women journalists working for ABC at the time, produced a documentary on the WLM for ABC. The timing of her report was calculated, to curtail the view of advocacy, as it had been approved in 1969, but it did not air until other media outlets had covered the topic, paving the way for an objective presentation. Sander's production attempted to add legitimacy to women's claims and shed a homogenized evaluation of the movement, "edging lesbians, women of color and the movement's most radical" elements out of the portrait. By redefining the movement, Sanders attempted to legitimize the need for social justice and present the demands of women as socially acceptable goals.

The media coverage brought forth one of the problems of the WLM's loose organizational structure. Though thousands of organizations had formed in the 1960s and 1970s and there were chapters from coast to coast and throughout the Heartland, finding an organization to join was difficult for many. Unable to locate organizations in the phonebook, many felt that the movement was invisible, while still others embraced the ideals without actually joining formal institutions. There were few public spaces where unattended women could gather freely and urban settings with racially segregated spaces were ingrained in the culture. The problem of finding spaces to meet was compounded by the practice of denying women credit without men's consent, thus renting a visible meeting place for women to come together was complicated, forcing women to gather in unconventional settings. For example, the Chicago Lesbian Liberation solved their meeting problems by gathering on a "slow night" at a local bar known as King's Ransom, which welcomed their multi-racial composition. The proprietor was happy for the business and ladies night became a regular feature of the establishment. The Women's Liberation Center rented an abandoned firehouse from New York City for $1 per month (equivalent to $8 in 2025) but had to shovel coal in order to keep it warm.

Women's centers began to be created all over the country as a place for women to meet outside the home. Most of them were run as collectives and spaces for consciousness-raising groups to meet in a non-competitive environment, where women could discuss the intersection of their personal lives, as well as politics and the economy. For example, in January 1971, over one hundred women illegally occupied an abandoned city building on East Fifth Street in New York City, where they organized non-hierarchically and established a shelter, food co-operative, medical clinic, and health center. The Fifth Street Women's Building Takeover lasted for thirteen days, until the women were evicted and arrested by city authorities.

By 1972, the New York Radical Feminist had prepared a set of instructions for developing consciousness-raising groups. The analysis that went on in these sessions was not therapeutic, but instead an evaluation of how one's personal experience had been shaped by cultural norms. "Meetings were designed to turn the personal into the political", by making women aware that the personal experiences were not unique and had social constructs.

It soon became apparent that small groups and loose cooperative organization was effective for building awareness, but to turn awareness into action more efficient structures were required. For example, the Crenshaw Women's Center in Los Angeles initially opened in 1970 with participants bringing their own pillows as seats. Eventually they collected second-hand furniture and developed a playground, assuming that their evening functions would be attended by women with children. Nine groups—“Haymarket Liberation, the New Adult Community of Women, NOW, Socialist Women’s Organizing Project, the Union of Women’s International Liberation, the Venice-Santa Monica Women’s Liberation, Women’s Liberation Front—UCLA, Women’s Liberation One and Working Women's Group”—came together to offer services to some 1500 women. They offered abortion and contraceptive counseling; personal and vocational consultations; ran a suicide hotline; published a monthly newsletter, The Women’s Center News; maintained a library of feminist writings; provided lectures on legal rights; and taught courses on self-defense. Following their ideal that new structures were needed to build women-only spaces, the center was open to all women and their children. Within a year, NOW withdrew from the collective and established an almost identical center which was open only to their members and invited guests, which included men.

By 1973, with the oil crisis and in reaction to 1960s radicalism, the US environment became more politically conservative. Combined with economic stagflation, radicalism lost favor. The fragile solidarity which had existed between various WLM groups began to fracture as the movement had developed no mechanism for political action other than direct confrontation. Though leftist, they did not adhere to any specific political alignment. The drive to create women-only spaces eliminated the need to confront sexism, as it allowed women to simply evade patriarchal organizations. Thus, rather than rendering gender irrelevant, for which liberationists argued, the cultural feminists, who evolved from them, created a counter-cultural movement to celebrate female difference. For example, Ms. began publication in 1972 co-opting the radicals' ideas of women's oppression and personal introspection, but blamed systemic causes for the issues, rather than men, and promoted self-improvement as a means to change women's lives, rather than politicization. Other groups embracing the idea of a utopian society composed solely of women were inspired by Jill Johnston's 1973 publication of Lesbian Nation. Johnston promoted the idea of a complete break from men and patriarchal institutions arguing for women's separatism. Believing that lesbianism was a political stance, she argued that regardless of who they slept with, whether they knew it or not, "all women were lesbians".

In 1974, the Combahee River Collective was founded in Boston by twins Barbara and Beverly Smith, and former Black Panther activist Demita Frazier. Formed as a consciousness-raising group for lesbian feminists, it soon attracted members including Akasha Gloria Hull and Audre Lorde and began hosting retreats across the Northeastern United States. At the retreats intersectionality and overlapping identities were explored. The group continued meeting through 1980. By 1975, the Women's Liberation Movement had become simply the women's movement with liberals, who were pursuing reformist cultural feminism prevailing as the dominant group. Radical groups became marginalized and those that did not support the reformist climate splintered. However, in the short history of the WLM the movement exploded into a world-wide awareness of sexism and pushed the liberal feminists far to the left of their original aims.

== Mexico ==
The first group affiliated with the ideas of the Women's Liberation Movement in Mexico was the Mujeres en Acción Solidaria (Women Acting in Solidarity, MAS) formed informally in Mexico City in 1970. The student movement and women's movement in the United States called into question not just needed educational reforms and social imbalances, but led to the realization that the political system and the structures of power were authoritarian and coercive and needed restructuring. Initially members of MAS met informally to question the roles of women in Mexican society. In April 1971, Magdalena Zapián attempted to get a permit for a protest to be held at the Monument to the Mother, but was denied permission. Deciding to go ahead with the demonstration, MAS' first public action was to hold a protest on Mother's Day 1971 to question why motherhood was required for all women.

At regular consciousness-raising sessions, the women met to discuss collective solutions to politicize their personal issues. That same year, Susan Sontag gave a presentation on feminism at the National Autonomous University of Mexico (UNAM) and so many women began wanting to participate that the group split into a north and south group. Their ideas spread in 1972 after publication of an article "La situación de la mujer en México" (The Situation of Women in Mexico) was published in the magazine Punto Crítico and members began organizing events at universities in Chihuahua, Guanajuato, Jalapa, Morelia, San Luis Potosí, and Zacatecas, to discuss topics like child care centers, employment inequality, and reproductive rights. By 1973, the group was known throughout Mexico and hosted conferences at UNAM on abortion, sexuality, feminism and politics, as well as other topics. They also established a day care center, where meetings could be held, but increasingly the diverse points of view fractured MAS.

In February 1974 a group of former MAS members split off and formed the Movimiento de Liberación de la Mujer (MLM). The more radical members of the MAS did not join MLM, which incorporated class struggles with the struggle against sexism. To expand their membership, they wanted to embrace a wider definition of women's issues, but in effect, it had the opposite effect, as small interest groups formed in the new organization focusing on specific goals. The small interest groups worked collectively on issues like abortion and a plan to host a counter-conference during the World Conference on Women hosted by Mexico in 1975. The planning of the conference again the official UN conference created discord, and yet another split occurred, when a group of women split off to form the Colectivo La Revuelta (Collective Revolt) with the purpose of establishing a magazine to disseminate their ideas on the movement. The remaining members of the MLM continued to change and evolve, with groups splitting off such as the Movimiento Feminista Mexicano (Movement of Mexican Feminists, MFM), which in 1976 became the main members of the Coalición de Mujeres Feministas (Coalition of Feminist Women, CMF) The CMF focused mainly on voluntary maternity and violence against women and began to establish women's shelters. The Lucha Feminista (Feminist Struggle), which formed in 1978, reformed into the Frente Nacional por los Derechos y la Liberación de las Mujeres (National Front for the Rights and the Liberation of Women, FNALIDM) in 1980, but it would dissolve a year after formation. That same year, the remaining MLM members formed the Colectivo de Acción Solidaria con Empleadas Domésticas (Collective of Solidarity Action with Domestic Employees, CASED), to support women working as housekeepers.

The Colectivo began publishing in 1977, a journal titled with the same name as their group to discuss the topics ranging from abortion to domestic obligation and including rape, sexuality, and prostitution. They were the most radical group which formed in Mexico, supporting separation from hierarchical structures, such as political parties and unions, and even other feminist groups. After publishing nine issues of Colectivo La Revuelta they started a newspaper with the name UnomásLlno (One plus one) in 1980, disseminating ideas about women's autonomy and living collectively with other women. In 1983, the group dissolved after their publication of Revuelta, reflexiones, testimonios y reportajes de Mujeres en México, 1975–1983 (Revolt, reflections, testimonies and stories of women in Mexico, 1975–1983), which gave the history of the group and summary of their objectives.

By the early 1980s, the dominant feminists in Mexico had become the Movimiento Nacional de Mujeres (National Movement of Women, MNM), which had been founded in 1973 following the model of the United States' organization National Organization for Women. Like its US counterpart, the MNM were mainly middle-class women who were interested in reforming existing civil codes as a means to attain women's equality.

== See also ==
- Women's liberation movement in Asia
- Women's liberation movement in Europe
- Women's liberation movement in Oceania
- Feminism in the United States
- Second-wave feminism § Overview in the United States
