= E. Kitch Childs =

American clinical psychologist

Dr. E. Kitch Childs
- Born: April 11, 1937; Pittsburgh, Pennsylvania
- Died: January 10, 1993 (aged 55)
- Occupation: Clinical Psychologist
- Awards: Chicago LGBT Hall of Fame

Academic background
- Education: University of Chicago; University of Pittsburgh

Academic work
- Institutions: Private Practice, Oakland, California

E. Kitch Childs (April 11, 1937 – January 10, 1993) was a significant American clinical psychologist and an activist known for her participation in the women's liberation movement in North America during the "second wave" of feminism during the 1960s and 70s. It was during this time that 'Feminist Therapy' emerged which Childs spearheaded. Through this work she advocated for minority women, prostitutes, gays and lesbians. She was a founding member of the University of Chicago's Gay Liberation and the first African American woman to earn her doctorate degree in Human Development at the University of Chicago.

== Education ==
Childs attended the University of Pittsburgh, and she graduated with a Bachelor of Science in Chemistry. She was so brilliant academically that she accomplished this during her early teen years. Later, Childs would attend the University of Chicago and received her Master of Science in Human Development in 1972. She was one of the first African-American women to earn a doctorate from the University of Chicago, also in human development.

== Early life ==
Childs was born in Pittsburgh, Pennsylvania as the youngest and only girl in her family. Along with her three older brothers, Childs moved to Chicago, Illinois to live with their grandmother. During the 1940s Chicago was extremely segregated. Childs lost two of her older brothers to racial violence at a young age.

== Career ==
After her graduation, Childs joined the United States Navy. As Childs prepared to enter the workforce, intense societal shifts were occurring. Many of these changes "were tied directly or indirectly to the writings, activism, and therapy done by feminist psychotherapists."

In 1973, she started her first private practice in Oakland, California where she worked as a clinical psychologist for 17 years. During this time, Childs worked to establish her practice and steady clientele. She focused on inclusive, patient-centered care. An integral part of this was using a sliding scale payment method to limit barriers to her services. It was known that Childs would not charge certain clients for sessions. Despite this, during her 27 years in California, she was receiving disability checks, only emphasizing her dedication to her work. Thus, Childs "struggled and lived modestly well below her possibilities" as she maintained her clientele. This kind of work champions Childs as a pioneer in the field of psychology, being one of the first therapists to hold therapy sessions in her house and in her clients' houses. With this approach and others, Childs aimed to support black women and, furthermore, gay black women by "creating a treatment model where her clients would feel included".

== Association for Women in Psychology ==
Childs was a founding member of the Association for Women in Psychology (AWP). Childs as well as her two cofounders, Phyllis Chesler and Dorothy Riddle, formed the AWP in order to address the lack of organized research into the psychology of women. Initially the AWP was a group of female psychologists and activists who advocated within the American Psychological Association (APA) in order to address the grievances of female clients, psychologists, and councilors. Childs utilized this platform to advocate for marginalized women, namely black women and lesbians. In addition, she called for the APA to influence changes in the way these groups area treated in the fields of banking, medicine, legal issues, and education systems. She recognized that access to quality psychological services was disproportionately available to these marginalized groups. The practices upheld by the APA marginalized these women and promoted treatment options which were inherently sexist and not supported by the ongoing research into the psychology of women. By 1973 the AWP had accomplished enough credited research into the psychology of women that it became recognized as "Division 35" of the APA.

== Activism ==
Childs was a lesbian, and an activist in queer, women's and Black spaces. She advocated for the decriminalization of prostitution through her involvement in the sex worker's rights group COYOTE (Call Off Your Old Tired Ethics) and anti-racist social movements. In COYOTE, Childs served as an ally alongside sex workers who were demanding respect from society, the decriminalization of prostitution, and to stop police harassment.

She was a founding member of the University of Chicago's Chicago Lesbian Liberation along with Vernita Gray and Michal Brody. At the time, the organization was named Women's Caucus of Chicago Gay Liberation. The organization helped organize the first pride in Chicago in 1970. She provided therapy for LGBTQ individuals, particularly those with AIDS. Childs was inducted into the Chicago LGBT Hall of Fame in 1993. This honor was given in recognition of her efforts to dismantle the American Psychiatric Association's position on homosexuality, which was listed as a psychological disorder in the Diagnostic and Statistical Manual of Mental Disorders until 1973.

== Later life ==
Only three years after moving to Amsterdam, Childs died due to heart failure in 1993.

== Representative publications ==
- Childs, E. K. (1966). Careers in the Military Service: A Review of the Literature. National Opinion Research Center, University of Chicago.
- Childs, E. K. (1972). Prediction of Outcome in Encounter Groups: Outcome as a Function of Selected Personality Correlates (Doctoral dissertation, University of Chicago, Committee on Human Development).
- Childs, E. K. (1976). An Annotated Bibliography on Prison Health Care. Prisoners' Health Project, San Francisco General Hospital Medical Center.
- Childs, E. K. (1990). Therapy, feminist ethics, and the community of color with particular emphasis on the treatment of Black women. In H. Lerman & N. Porter (Eds.), Feminist ethics in psychotherapy (p. 195–203). Springer Publishing Company.
