= Service, Office and Retail Workers' Union of Canada =

SORWUC
- Service, Office and Retail Workers' Union of Canada
- Founded: 1972
- Dissolved: 1986
- Headquarters: Vancouver, British Columbia
- Location: Canada
- Key people: Helen Potrebenko
- Affiliations: Independent

The Service, Office and Retail Workers' Union of Canada (SORWUC) was an independent feminist labour union based in Vancouver, British Columbia, Canada. It was organized and led by women workers, though membership was not restricted by gender. It was formed from members who were part of the Vancouver Women's Caucus. SORWUC organized across a number of industries, including bank employees, restaurant workers, and day care centres from 1972 to 1986. SORWUC defended Stella Bliss in her attempt to receive unemployment benefits while pregnant. The case eventually became Bliss v Canada.
