= Vernita Gray =

African-American lesbian activist and writer

- Vernita Gray, 2006 by Matt Simonette
- Born: Vernita M. Gray; December 8, 1948; Chicago, Illinois
- Died: March 18, 2014 (aged 65); Chicago, Illinois
- Education: Columbia College Chicago
- Occupations: LGBT and women's right's activist, writer, restaurateur
- Years active: 1969–2014
- Movement: LGBT Rights, Women's Rights
- Spouse: Patricia Ewert (married 27 November 2013)
- Partner: Patricia Ewert (2009)
- Awards: Chicago LGBT Hall of Fame 1992, Stonewall Award 1998

Vernita Gray (December 8, 1948 – March 18, 2014) was an African-American lesbian and women's liberation activist from the beginning of those movements in Chicago. She began her writing career publishing in the newsletter Lavender Woman. After owning and operating her own restaurant for almost a decade, Gray became the LGBT liaison for the Cook County State's Attorney's office. In 2013, she and her partner became the first same-sex partners to wed in Illinois.

== Early life ==
Vernita M. Gray was born on December 8, 1948 in Chicago, Illinois to Fran (née Kersh) Gray Hairston. While attending St. Mary's High School in Chicago, Martin Luther King Jr. moved into a house three blocks from her own and began organizing demonstrations. Gray became involved in the civil rights movement, when a friend suggested they should take part in the protests. Upon completing her secondary education, Gray enrolled at Columbia College Chicago, graduating with a degree in communications and creative writing. In the summer of 1969, Gray traveled with her friend, Michal Brody to attend Woodstock. While there, Brody picked up a brochure about the Stonewall riots, and the two made a decision to become involved in the gay liberation movement when they returned to Chicago.

== Career ==
Returning from the festival, Brody and Henry Weimhoff founded the Chicago Gay Alliance, initially called the Chicago Gay Liberation. Almost simultaneously, Gray, along with Brody, E. Kitch Childs and Margaret E. Sloan, among others, founded the Women's Caucus of the CGA. From the beginning, the Women's Caucus was a multi-racial organization, though numbers of white and black members shifted over time. The Women's Caucus changed their name to Chicago Lesbian Liberation (CLL) and split from the CGA when it became apparent that the parent organization was ignoring the issues of gender and race. Gray also established an LGBTQ support hotline with the telephone number FBI-LIST (324–5478), which was operated from her apartment in Hyde Park. Her apartment on 56th Street at Drexel Avenue, often served as a temporary shelter for homeless LGBTQ youth and eventually she had to leave it to regain her privacy. In 1970, she took a cross-country trip with a group of gay men and in 1972, a trip to France. After a visit to Paris, she went to the Taizé monastery, where she worked answering letters. On her return trip to Paris, Gray met James Baldwin. The experiences of the trip rejuvenated her belief in social activism.

The CLL founded a newspaper, the Lavender Woman, held consciousness-raising sessions, and participated in direct actions. Gray was actively involved, participating in and helping to organize the 1970 Pride March in Chicago and writing for the Lavender Woman. The weekly gatherings of the CLL were known as "Monday Night Meetings" and post-meeting festivities were held at King's Ransom pub, located at 20 E. Chicago Avenue. The pub's central location and tolerance for their mixed-race group, made it popular for the liberationists to meet there and the bar owner, pleased to have a crowd on a typically unprofitable night, made it "ladies night". Gray was not a separatist and voiced her opposition when the Women's Center operated by the Pride and Prejudice Bookstore changed to the Lesbian Feminist Center and began excluding anyone who did not accept that men and male-defined organizations and institutions should be completely separate from women's activities.

In addition to her activism, Gray began her career working for the telephone company and as a copyeditor for Playboy. In the early 1980s, she opened a restaurant known as Sol Sands on West Montrose Avenue in Uptown, which she operated for eight years. She published a book of her own poetry, Sweet Sixteen in 1986 and participated in poetry performances at Mountain Moving Coffeehouse. After she closed the restaurant, she ran a company which developed children's audio visual materials for three years. She also continued publishing in both mainstream media and gay media publications, including the newspapers Nightlines and Outlines.

In 1992, Gray was inducted into the Chicago Gay and Lesbian Hall of Fame for her many years of activism. The following year, she went to work in the office of the Cook County State's Attorney as an LGBTQ victim-witness coordinator for community members and their families who were involved in domestic violence or hate crimes. In 1993, she was one of the plaintiffs involved in the Lambda Legal case, securing the right for gays and lesbians to march in the Bud Billiken Parade and Picnic. Gray was diagnosed with breast cancer in 1995 and after chemotherapy treatment her cancer went into remission. In 1998, in recognition of her work, she was honored along with Shadow Morton, Damian Pardo, and Margarita Sánchez De León with the Stonewall Award, presented by the Anderson Prize Foundation to LGBTQ activists working to improve their communities.

On 1999, Gray was promoted within the State's Attorney's Office to serve as a liaison for the LGBTQ community, participating in outreach events in the community and among the general public. In her work, she assisted victims of crime as well as the families of murdered LGBTQ people, teaching in various schools about hate crimes, and presenting educational programs on television. In 2001, she became the victim of an illegal eviction, when she returned after making a presentation on hate crime to find that her condominium association had evicted her. Ignoring a court order vacating a previous eviction request, based upon alleged discrimination against Gray and her then partner, Pat Gilbert, because the couple were lesbian and mixed-race, the association contacted sheriffs deputies to evict Gray and confiscated all of her belongings. Citing her awards and position with the government, the judge returned Gray's condominium to her.

In her later years, Gray worked to preserve LGBTQ history and with the LGBT Task Force of AARP to advise on issues concerning aging in the LGBTQ community. In 2003 Gray's cancer returned and she opted to have a double mastectomy with immediate reconstructive surgery. Though she identified as a butch lesbian, Gray struggled with whether to do the reconstruction, but later said she was glad that she had done so. When Barack Obama, whom she had worked with when he was a Senator from Illinois was elected president, Gray was invited to the White House for the 2009 Pride reception. Four months later, she went to the White House again when the president signed the Matthew Shepard and James Byrd Jr. Hate Crimes Prevention Act, which she had advocated passing for many years.

Gray met Patricia Ewert through her work and in 2009 the two became engaged. They were united in a civil ceremony in Illinois in 2011, the year Gray retired after 18 years of service in the offices of the State's Attorney and her cancer returned. In 2013, the couple actively were involved in campaigning for same-sex marriage in Illinois, despite Gray's cancer spreading to her brain. After the state Senate approved a bill on Valentine's Day, the vote was not called in the House fearing lack of support. Working behind the scenes, Gray argued that Ewert should receive her Social Security survivor benefits. When the bill passed in November, but did not allow couples to marry until the following June, Lambda Legal filed a case on November 22, seeking an immediate relief for Gray and Ewert to marry. Within days, their case was reviewed and Judge Thomas Durkin granted permission for them to marry. Gray and Ewert became the first same-sex couple legally allowed to exchange vows in Illinois, when they were married on 27 November 2013.

== Death and legacy ==
Gray died on 18 March 2014 from cancer at her home in Edgewater Beach. She was recognized by the Illinois General Assembly for her activism at the time of her death. That same year, a biography of her life Vernita Gray: from Woodstock to the White House was published by Tracy Baim and Owen Keehnen.
