= Hollibaugh =

Hollibaugh is a surname. Notable people with the surname include:

- Amber L. Hollibaugh (born 1946), American writer, filmmaker, and activist
- Jonathan J. Hollibaugh (1891–1953), American politician
- Marge Hollibaugh (1921–1997), Canadian feminist
