= Margaret Benston =

Canadian scientist and feminist

Margaret Lowe Benston
- Born: 1937
- Died: 1991 (aged 53–54)
- Citizenship: Canadian
- Scientific career
- Fields: Chemistry, computer science, women's studies, labour studies
- Institutions: Simon Fraser University

Margaret "Maggie" Lowe Benston (1937–1991) was a professor of chemistry, computing science, and women's studies at Simon Fraser University in Vancouver, British Columbia, Canada. She was a respected feminist and labour activist, as well as a founding member of the Vancouver Women's Caucus, in 1988, the Euphoniously Feminist and Non-Performing Quintet in 1970, Simon Fraser University's Women's Studies Program in 1975, and Mayworks in 1988. For thirty years, Benston worked locally, nationally, and internationally writing articles, giving speeches, and lobbying politicians on behalf of the women's and labour movement. Benston died of cancer on 7 March 1991.

== Academic work ==
Margaret Benston obtained an undergraduate degree in chemistry and philosophy and a PhD in theoretical chemistry from the University of Washington in 1964. Following this, she worked as a post-doctoral student at the University of Wisconsin. Benston joined Simon Fraser University as a charter faculty member in 1966 in the Department of Chemistry. She was one of the founders of Women's Studies program in the mid-1970s, and taught in the program part-time. Best known for articles such as "Infrared Spectroscopy" in The Annual Review of Physical Chemistry and "New Force Theorem" in The Journal of Chemistry and Physics, Benston continued as a practicing scientist throughout her life, but also went on to be more involved in feminism and activism. Her 1969 essay, The Political Economy of Women's Liberation, was one of the first Marxist feminist critiques from a Canadian perspective. This article helped establish the framework for much of the feminist debates in the 1970s, as it was one of the first to use a Marxist parameter to explain the oppression of women. The article was later reproduced in books such as Liberation Now? Women in a Made-Made World and Feminist Frameworks, it was also translated into Spanish, French, Italian, Swedish, German, and Japanese.

In the 1980s, Benston became interested in computer science. She switched fields and received a joint appointment in the Women's Studies and Computing Science departments. Thereafter she explored the relationship between computerization, women, and work.

Benston was the first to argue that women formed a reserve army of labour, a group that could be manipulated in a certain way because women are responsible for the reproduction of labour power. She argued that women's domestic and wage labour were essential to the flow of capitalist production and that women could not be fully integrated into wage labour without a full transformation in both of the forms of labour, which ultimately would mean a transformation of capitalism. In turn, this created the view that women form a class because of their domestic labour, this became known internationally as the domestic labour debate.

== Personal life and activism ==
Committed to social justice, Benston was a founding member of the Euphoniously Feminist and Non-Performing Quintet, groups who taught feminist labour and anti-war songs to audiences at picket lines and rallies. As a labour activist, she helped found Vancouver Mayworks (a cultural festival celebrating workers), the Vancouver Women's Caucus, a New Left political craze that swept Simon Fraser University in the late 1960s, and Women's Skills Development of British Columbia. A music fan, she played a leading role in establishing the Vancouver Folk Music Festival. Benston also helped start the Vancouver Mayworks, a festival that celebrated workers' culture. Mayworks is currently a Festival of Labour and the Arts, with active participants in Parksville, Comox Valley and Campbell River, on Vancouver Island.

With five other women (Mary Vickers, Hilda Ching, Abby Schwarz, Mary Jo Duncan, Diana Herbst), Benston founded The Society for Canadian Women in Science and Technology (SCWIST) in Vancouver in 1981, which aims to "support and promote the education of girls and women through programs and activities that we develop in partnership with the community." Benston died in 1991 at age 52, after a long battle with cancer.

== Legacy ==
The Maggie Benston Centre at Simon Fraser University was the second campus building named after a woman at the university (the first being the Madge Hogarth residence).

The Margaret Lowe Benston Memorial Graduate Bursary in Gender, Sexuality and Women's Studies is named after her. The purpose of this award is to provide financial support for students in the MA and PhD programs in the Department of Gender, Sexuality, and Women's Studies at Simon Fraser University.

Begun in 1994, the "Margaret Lowe Benston (MLB) Lecture Series in Social Justice is financed by an endowment established in her memory. There is an annual event hosted by the Department of Gender, Sexuality, and Women's Studies at Simon Fraser University. Events are often lectures but have also included dance performances and film presentations (ex. My Name Was January). Some past speakers/presenters include Alex Sangha, Elina Gress, Lenee Son, Velvet Steele, and Natasha Adsit (2019), Susan Stryker (2014), Maude Barlow, Sitara Thobani (2008), Arno Kamolika, Doudou Diène, Lisa Helps, Becki Ross & Jamie Lee Hamilton, Joan Sangster, Chris E. Vargas, Marilyn Waring and Leslie Feinberg. The events continue to be highly successful, having a general attendance of between 200 and 320 people.

== Publications ==
=== Books ===
- Benston, Margaret; Jasteenmaki, Moira K., eds. (1972). Quantitative chemistry. New York: Van Nostrand Reinhold. OCLC 251684.
- Benston, Margaret; DeBresson, Chris; Vorst, Jesse, eds. (1987). Work and new technologies: other perspectives. Toronto: Between the Lines. ISBN 9780919946835.
- Benston, Margaret; Tomm, Winnie, eds. (1989). The effects of feminist approaches on research methodologies. Waterloo, Ontario, Canada: Wilfrid Laurier University Press. ISBN 9780889209862.

=== Book chapters ===
- Benston, Margaret (1978), "Introduction", in Connelly, Patricia (ed.), Last hired, first fired: women and the Canadian work force, Toronto: Women's Educational Press, ISBN 9780889610446
- Benston, Margaret (1982), "Feminism and the critique of scientific method", in Miles, Angela; Finn, Geraldine (eds.), Feminism in Canada: from pressure to politics, Montréal: Black Rose Books, ISBN 9780919619005
- Benston, Margaret (1983), "For women, now the chips are down", in Zimmerman, Jan (ed.), The Technological woman: interfacing with tomorrow, New York: Praeger Press, ISBN 9780030628290
- Benston, Margaret (1983), "Women Scientists, Machines and Technology", Proceedings, First National Conference on Women in Science, Vancouver: SCWIST, OCLC 25433607, archived from the original on 2014-10-14
- Benston, Margaret (1985), "Power to the end user", in Wilson, Donna M. (ed.), Democratic socialism: the challenge of the eighties and beyond: proceedings of a conference, Vancouver, Canada: New Star Books, ISBN 9780919573451
- Benston, Margaret (1988), "Women's voices/men's voices: technology as language", in Kramarae, Cheris (ed.), Technology and women's voices: keeping in touch, New York London: Routledge & Kegan Paul, ISBN 9780710206794
- Benston, Margaret (1989), "Feminism and system design: questions of control", in Benston, Margaret; Tomm, Winnie (eds.), The effects of feminist approaches on research methodologies, Waterloo, Ontario, Canada: Wilfrid Laurier University Press, ISBN 9780889209862

=== Articles ===
- Benston, Margaret L.; Kirtman, Bernard; Cross, Paul C. (October 1961). "Vibration-rotation spectroscopy". Annual Review of Physical Chemistry. 12: 285–302. Bibcode:1961ARPC...12..285K. doi:10.1146/annurev.pc.12.100161.001441.
- Benston, Margaret L.; Kirtman, Bernard (1 January 1966). "Diatomic forces and force constants. II. Variation—perturbation method". Journal of Chemical Physics. 44 (1): 126–129. Bibcode:1966JChPh..44..126B. doi:10.1063/1.1726435.
- Benston, Margaret L.; Kirtman, Bernard (1 January 1966). "Diatomic forces and force constants. I. Errors in the Hellmann—Feynman method". Journal of Chemical Physics. 44 (1): 119–125. Bibcode:1966JChPh..44..119B. doi:10.1063/1.1726434.
- Benston, Margaret (1 February 1966). "New force theorem". Journal of Chemical Physics. 44 (3): 1300–1301. Bibcode:1966JChPh..44.1300B. doi:10.1063/1.1726821.
- Benston, Margaret; Chong, Delano P. (January 1967). "Off-diagonal constrained variations in open-shell SCF theory". Molecular Physics. 12 (5): 487–492. Bibcode:1967MolPh..12..487B. doi:10.1080/00268976700100621.
- Benston, Margaret L.; Kirtman, Bernard (15 January 1967). "Extended‐average‐energy method for perturbation problems". Journal of Chemical Physics. 46 (2): 472–477. Bibcode:1967JChPh..46..472K. doi:10.1063/1.1840691.
- Benston, Margaret; Chong, Delano P. (1968). "Multi-configuration self-consistent field theory with non-orthogonal orbitals". Molecular Physics. 14 (5): 449–456. Bibcode:1968MolPh..14..449L. doi:10.1080/00268976800100561.
- Benston, Margaret; Chong, Delano P. (January 1968). "Parameters for multiple constraints". Theoretica Chimica Acta. 12 (2): 175–177. doi:10.1007/BF00539389. S2CID 98223826.
- Benston, Margaret; Chong, Delano P. (1 August 1968). "Off‐diagonal hypervirial theorems as constraints". Journal of Chemical Physics. 49 (3): 1302–1306. Bibcode:1968JChPh..49.1302C. doi:10.1063/1.1670224.
- Benston, Margaret (September 1969). "The political economy of women's liberation". Monthly Review. 21 (4): 13–27. doi:10.14452/MR-021-04-1969-08_2. S2CID 144727738.
- Benston, Margaret; Chong, Delano P.; Wang, Pearl S.C. (15 August 1973). "Constrained variation method for excited‐state energies of atoms and molecules". Journal of Chemical Physics. 59 (4): 1721–1725. Bibcode:1973JChPh..59.1721W. doi:10.1063/1.1680254.
- Benston, Margaret; Chong, Delano P.; Scott, William R.; Yue, Chee P.; Wang, Pearl S.C.; Palke, William E. (January 1974). "Application of the distinguishable electron method". International Journal of Quantum Chemistry. 8 (1): 137–150. doi:10.1002/qua.560080114.
- Benston, Margaret. "Strategies for social change". Second Wave. 2 (2): 10–15.
- Benston, Margaret; Davitt, Pat J. (June 1975). "Women invent society". Canadian Dimension. 10. Dimension Publishing Inc.: 69–79.
- Benston, Margaret; Davitt, Pat J. (1978). "Single working women and the industrial revolution". Makara. Pacific Women’s Graphic Arts Co-operative. Archived from the original on 2022-08-14.
- Benston, Margaret (1983). "Technology in the workplace: chipping away at women's work". Herizons. Archived from the original on 2017-12-02.
- Benston, Margaret (1983). "Artificial intelligence and dehumanization". Journal of Community Communications.
- Benston, Margaret; Lowe, Marian (1984). "The uneasy alliance of feminism and academia". Women's Studies International Forum. 7 (3): 177–183. doi:10.1016/0277-5395(84)90008-6.
- Benston, Margaret (1984). "The myth of computer literacy". Canadian Woman Studies. 5 (4). Inanna Publications: 20–24.
- Benston, Margaret (Fall 1984). "Review of Still Ain't Satisfied: Canadian Feminism Today by Maureen Fitzgerald, Connie Guberman, Margie Wolfe". Labour/Le Travail. 14: 243–245. doi:10.2307/25140499. JSTOR 25140499. Archived from the original on 2016-09-27.
- Benston, Margaret (Spring 1985). "Review of Science and Gender and Women and Minorities in Science". Atlantis: Critical Studies in Gender, Culture & Social Justice. 10 (2). Mount Saint Vincent University: 171–172. Archived from the original on 2017-12-02.
- Benston, Margaret (November 1986). "Questioning authority: women and scientific expertise". Resources for Feminist Research Journal. Archived from the original on 2017-12-18.

=== Papers ===
- Benston, Margaret (1988), "Empowering women in the practice of science and technology", Memoria de labores de la primera Conferencia Centroamericana de la Mujer en la Ciencia, la Tecnología y la Medicina [Proceedings of the first Central American Conference on Women in Science, Technology, and Medicine], Seattle, Washington: Kovalevskaia Fund, OCLC 23372704

== See also ==
- Helen Potrebenko, Vancouver author and friend of Benston
