= Marge Hollibaugh =

Marge Hollibaugh, born Margaret Eileen McCune
- Born: May 28, 1921
- Died: August 21, 1997 (aged 76); Chilliwack General Hospital, Canada
- Known for: Feminist
- Spouse: Ace Hollibaugh

Margaret E. (Marge) Hollibaugh (May 28, 1921 – August 21, 1997) was a Canadian feminist writer involved in the Abortion Caravan. Marge was married to Ace Hollibaugh, a student leader who had a passion for playing guitar. Marge and Ace had a daughter.

Hollibaugh was a member of "The Corrective Collective", a writing group which published She named it Canada because That's What It Was Called, and Neverdone: three centuries of women's work in Canada. She was a founding member of Vancouver Women's Caucus; a lifetime board member of the Anne Davis Transition House; an active participant in 'On To Ottawa Campaign' of 1970–71; and a supporting member of LEAF. She died of a stroke on August 21, 1997, at Chilliwack General Hospital, Chilliwack, British Columbia, Canada.
