= Woking, Alberta =

Woking
- Hamlet
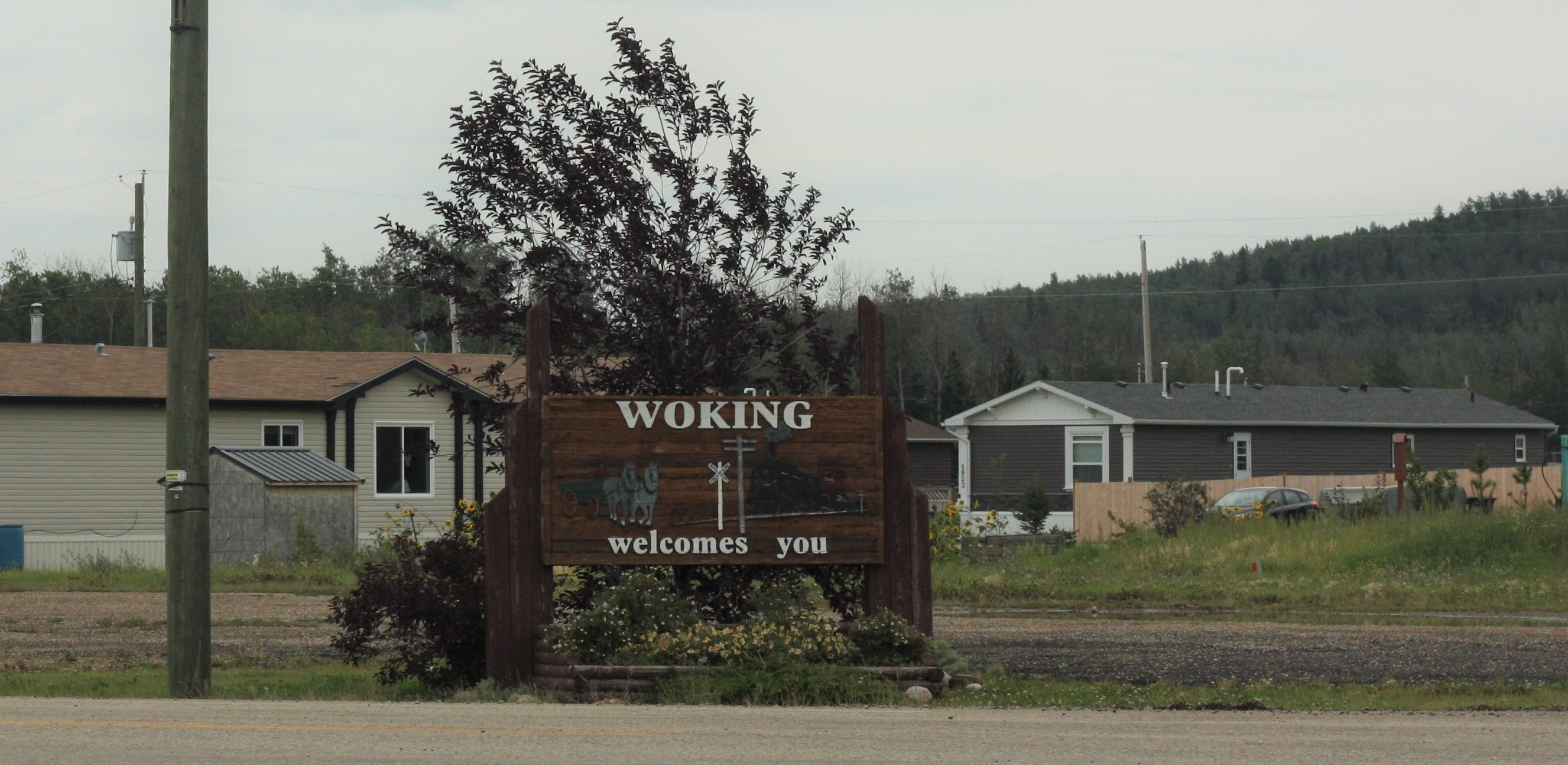
- Woking's welcome sign

- Location of Woking in Alberta
- Coordinates: 55.5925°N 118.7719°W
- Country: Canada
- Province: Alberta
- Census division: No. 19
- Municipal district: Saddle Hills County

Government
  - Type: Unincorporated
  - Governing body: Saddle Hills County Council

Area (2021)
  - Land: 0.55 km^{2} (0.21 sq mi)
- Elevation: 675 m (2,215 ft)

Population (2021)
  - Total: 62
  - Density: 113.6/km^{2} (294/sq mi)
- Time zone: UTC−06:00 (Alberta Time)

Woking is a hamlet in northwestern Alberta, Canada within Saddle Hills County. It is named for the town of Woking in Surrey, England.

It is located in the Peace River Country north of the Town of Sexsmith and south of the Village of Rycroft and the Town of Spirit River.

The hamlet is located in Census Division No. 19 and in the federal riding of Peace River.

== Demographics ==
Population history of Woking
Year	Pop.	±%
1951	87	—
1956	113	+29.9%
1961	157	+38.9%
1966	100	−36.3%
1971	85	−15.0%
1976	80	−5.9%
1981	106	+32.5%
1986	77	−27.4%
1991	91	+18.2%
1991A	92	+1.1%
1996	80	−13.0%
2001	87	+8.7%
2006	99	+13.8%
2011	106	+7.1%
2016	102	−3.8%
2021	62	−39.2%
Source: Statistics Canada

In the 2021 Census of Population conducted by Statistics Canada, Woking had a population of 62 living in 31 of its 36 total private dwellings, a change of −39.2% from its 2016 population of 102. With a land area of 0.55 km^{2} (0.21 sq mi), it had a population density of 112.7/km^{2} (292.0/sq mi) in 2021.

As a designated place in the 2016 Census of Population conducted by Statistics Canada, Woking had a population of 102 living in 43 of its 55 total private dwellings, a change of −3.8% from its 2011 population of 106. With a land area of 0.55 km^{2} (0.21 sq mi), it had a population density of 185.5/km^{2} (480.3/sq mi) in 2016.

== Notable people ==
Helen Potrebenko

== See also ==
- List of communities in Alberta
- List of designated places in Alberta
- List of hamlets in Alberta
- Woking, Surrey, United Kingdom
