= Helen Potrebenko =

Canadian author and activist (1940–2022)

- Born: June 21, 1940; Woking, Alberta, Canada
- Died: August 10, 2022 (aged 82); Vancouver, British Columbia, Canada
- Education: University of British Columbia
- Occupations: Author and activist
- Notable work: Taxi! (1975); No Streets of Gold (1977); Sometimes They Sang (1986)

Helen Potrebenko (June 21, 1940 – August 10, 2022) was a Canadian author and activist based in Vancouver. Her books were noted to be sharp-witted works that explored themes of feminism and spoke about the class divides and inherent misogyny in society. She was described as an uncompromising feminist writer who brought together ideas of Marxism and feminism in her works. Her most notable works included Taxi! (1975), No Streets of Gold (1977), A Flight of Average Persons (1979), and Sometimes They Sang (1986).

== Early life ==
Potrebenko was born on June 21, 1940, in Woking, Alberta, in the province's Peace River Country to Olena (née Hapaniuk) and Makar Potrebenko. She was the fourth among five siblings in a family of Ukrainian immigrants who had come to Canada in 1928. The family was not well-to-do and she was raised in poverty. She worked as a laboratory technician in Wainwright, Alberta, and later in Salmon Arm, British Columbia, before moving to Vancouver to pursue a university degree in sociology from the University of British Columbia.

== Career ==
When Potrebenko moved to Vancouver, she first worked as a delivery truck driver, and later as a taxi driver, while studying. Her first book, Taxi!, was published in 1975 and documented her experiences, telling the story of a female taxi driver in the city. In doing so, she highlighted poor working conditions for taxi drivers, prevailing sexism, misogyny, and sexualization, as well as the class divides existing in the city in the 1970s, exemplified by oil industry executives being taxied to the airport whereas the unemployed frequented skid rows. She also wrote about the prevailing gender wage disparity, with men being paid twice what she was paid for the same deliveries. Vancouver of the time was described as sleazy, with the rampant solicitation of women for sex, and drugs being peddled. The book did not find much of a readership at the time, but, found acceptance when it was re-published in 1989, and again in 2009. Modern Times Bookstore Collective, a bookstore known for its radical politics, placed a sign telling its customers that if there was only one book that they read in 1975 it had to be Taxi! outside its store in Mission District, San Francisco.

Potrebenko followed Taxi! with No Streets of Gold in 1977, documenting the history of Ukrainians in her home province of Alberta. In this book and in "A Different Story", a short story included in Hey Waitress and Other Stories (1989), she writes about Ukrainian Canadians, primarily peasant farmers, and the pioneering role that they played leaving Europe and landing in rural Canada seeking to secure homesteads in the late 19th century and early 20th century. She writes of the hard work, poverty, illness, and isolation they had to endure before sustenance in their new country. In the 1970s and 1980s, Potrebenko wrote for Pedestal, considered among the first of Canada's women's liberation newspapers.

Potrebenko's other books included A Flight of Average Persons (1979), Two Years on the Muckamuck Line (1981), and Hey Waitress and Other Stories (1989). Her 1986 book, Sometimes They Sang, was a commentary on social displacement, while her 1999 book Letters to Maggie was a collection of letters that she wrote to her friend and fellow social activist Margaret Benston after Benston's death in 1991, the letters touching on themes of aging, homelessness, and culture. Potrebenko also wrote poetry, with her works including Walking Slow (1985), a collection of poems describing her support for striking restaurant workers, and Life, Love and Unions (1987).

Potrebenko's books are noted for being sharp-witted works that explored the themes of feminism and spoke about the class divides and inherent misogyny in society at large. Foregrounding in her works the struggles of working-class women in the city in the 1970s and 1980s, she was characterised as one of the city's "most uncompromising feminist writers". She has also been described as being committed to the conjunction of "Marxism and feminism", with her works dealing with the relegation of women to "economic and sexual inferiority" in a male-led capitalistic society. Potrebenko's poetry has been described as being written in simple language but that speaks against social injustice perpetrated against working-class women by a male-dominated society.

Potrebenko participated in organized protests and strikes, including one at the Vancouver-based Muckamuck restaurant on Davie Street, where she demanded contracts for the Service, Office and Retail Workers’ Union of Canada (SORWUC) workers. After a dispute from 1978 to 1983, the restaurant closed and then opened under First Nations management. She wrote about the protests in her book Two Years on the Muckamuck Line (1981). Earlier, in 1975, Potrebenko with SORWUC organized Canada's only single-person bargaining unit when she sought and obtained certification for her work at Vancouver-based non-profit Volunteer Grandparents Society.

The Vancouver Public Library installed a plaque commemorating Potrebenko's work on Davie Street, not far from the Muckamuck restaurant, as a literary landmark.

== Gallery ==
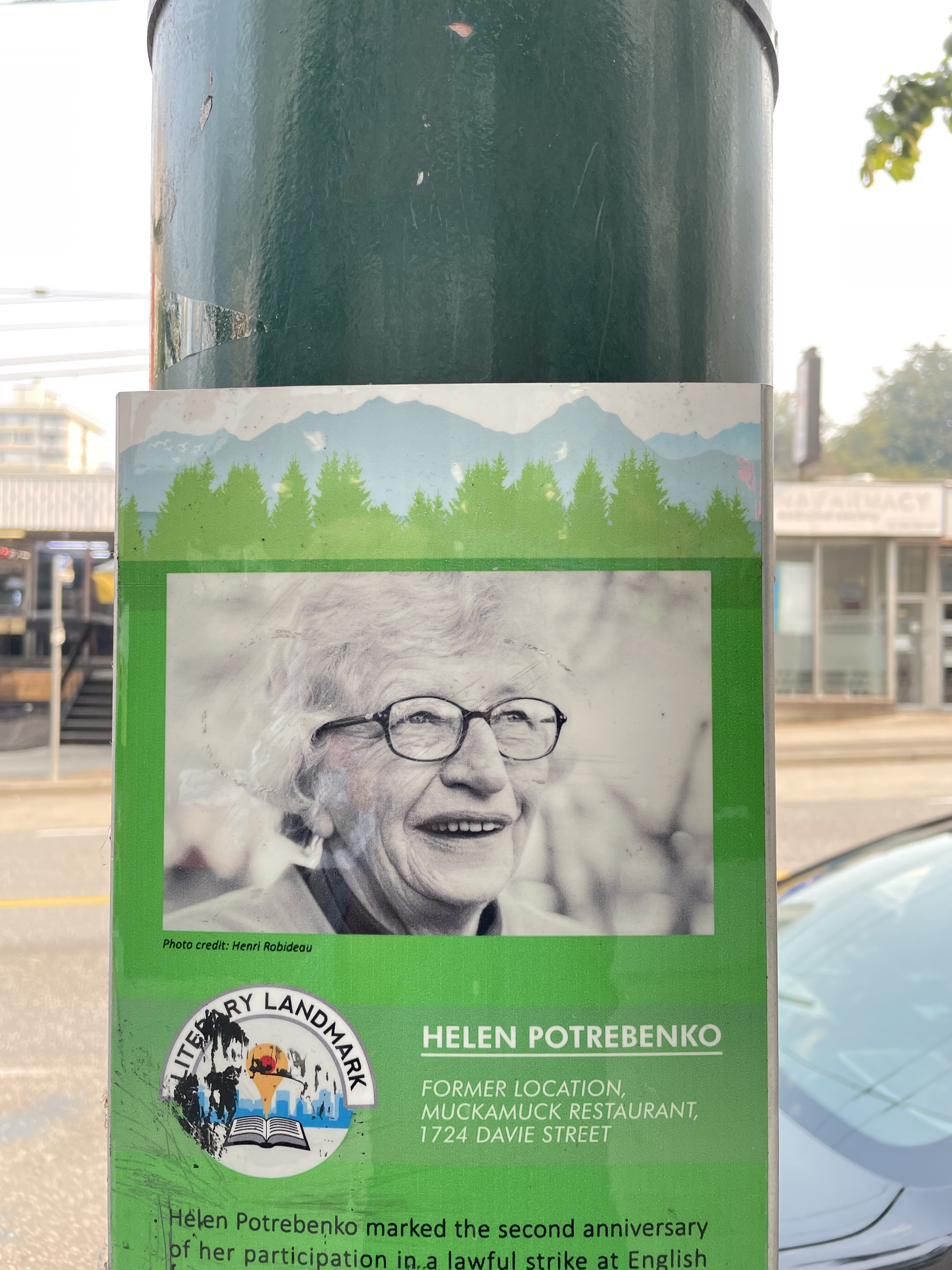
Vancouver Public Library's plaque in honor of Potrebenko as a part of its Literary Landmark series

== Personal life ==
Potrebenko was married to Earl Scott, with whom she lived in Burnaby in the larger Metro Vancouver region.

She died from cancer on August 10, 2022, at the age of 82, in Vancouver. Earl died in 2025.

== Select published works ==
- Taxi!: A Novel. Vancouver, B.C.: New Star Books. 1975. ISBN 0-919888-03-8. OCLC 2213736.
- No Streets of Gold: A Social History of Ukrainians in Alberta. Vancouver: New Star Books. 1977. ISBN 0-919888-70-4. OCLC 4110639.
- A Flight of Average Persons: Stories and Other Writings. Vancouver: New Star Books. 1979. ISBN 0-919888-96-8. OCLC 6172555.
- Walking Slow. Vancouver: Lazara Press. 1985. ISBN 0-920999-00-X. OCLC 16059834.
- Sometimes They Sang. Publication Studio Vancouver. 1986. ISBN 978-0-9877466-8-9. OCLC 1225074287.
- Hey Waitress and Other Stories. Vancouver: Lazara Press. 1989. ISBN 0-920999-12-3. OCLC 20358781.
- Letters to Maggie. Vancouver: Lazara Press. 1998. ISBN 0-920999-34-4. OCLC 40300704.
- Winter Words. Burnaby, British Columbia: H. Potrebenko. 2007. ISBN 978-0-9734628-1-4. OCLC 343724165.
