= Lavender Woman =

US lesbian periodical (1971–1976)

- November 1971 cover
- Launched: 1971; 55 years ago
- Ceased publication: 1976; 50 years ago
- Language: English
- City: Chicago, Illinois
- Country: United States

Lavender Woman was a lesbian periodical produced in Chicago, Illinois, from 1971 to 1976. The name Lavender Woman comes from the color lavender's prominence as a representation of homosexuality, starting in the 1950s and 1960s. It is believed that the color became a symbol due to it being a product of mixing baby blue (a traditionally masculine color) and pink (a traditionally feminine color). Lavender truly hit the spotlight as a symbol of homosexuality empowerment in 1969 when lavender sashes and armbands were distributed during a "gay power" march in New York.

There were 26 issues, published irregularly. Lavender Woman was a collaborative newspaper aimed at voicing the concerns of many in the lesbian community and also being an outlet for those concerns. The strive for inclusiveness was important to the lesbian community as a way to combat their feelings of exclusion from the mainstream feminist movement. It is said to be one of the "earliest out lesbian periodicals in the United States." The paper took submissions from the public and included letters, articles, poetry, photos, drawings, and advertisements.

== History ==
In November 1971, Lavender Woman began as a segment of the larger paper The Feminist Voice, written by members of the Women's Caucus of Chicago Gay Alliance, just 24 years after the "Lavender Scare". The Feminist Voice was a magazine that was "published in the interest of women". It is said that the writing of the 1970s had two goals. It helped minority women define feminism for themselves, but it also served in defending their right to feminism. The original cover art is credited to Susan Moore. The first issue of The Feminist Voice was published in August and in only four months Lavender Woman became its own publication. The Women of the publication felt as though, The Feminist Voice, as well as the Chicago Lesbian Liberation, had become too large and unfocused for their goals. Different women contributed to each issue and, on the second page of each, the contributors' names were listed. Allowing different women to contribute to each issue was a way to include many different lesbian voices and lesbian works in the magazine. It was their hope to include as many of these submissions as they could. Lavender Woman referred to these submissions as "bits of themselves" affirming that the art, writing, photos, etc., being shared were personal to those who chose to share their experiences.

The paper was distributed on the streets of multiple neighborhoods in Chicago, in small bookstores, and in women's centers around the area. It also had hundreds of local paid subscribers.

== The final edition ==
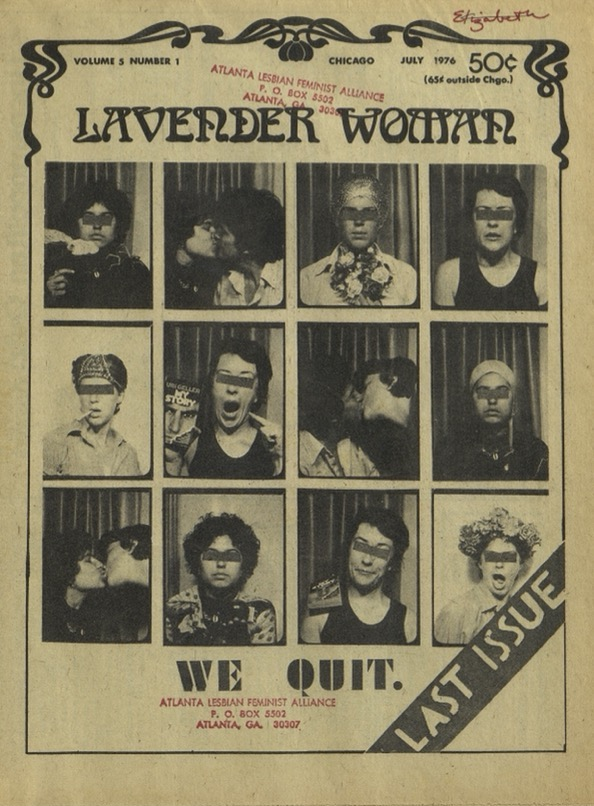
July 1976 Cover–The last edition of the Lavender Woman

The last edition of the Lavender Woman was published in July 1976, titled "WE QUIT." It cited four reasons for the end of the newspaper:

- The staff of the Lavender Woman had dwindled down to four main editors, two of whom were soon moving away from Chicago and would no longer be able to work on the paper. Staff credited in the final issue were Cynthia Carr, Muffy Halsted, Su Friedrich, Amy Sillman, and Susan Edwards.
- A feeling of disconnect from the community.

The women of the LW are more observers of the community than participants in it. It never used to be that way. LW was once a hub of activity for the lesbian community but now it's just a place for women who like to do newspaper work.

— Staff, The Lavender Woman, Volume 5, Number 1

- The paper consumed too much time and energy, and took too long to get done.
- There was a loss of interest and a feeling of boredom over the topics of the paper.
  We've changed—we of the LW staff... We're bored with the label [of lesbian newspaper] and we want to pay attention to the other things we're interested in.
  — Staff, Lavender Woman, Volume 5, Number 1

== Archives ==
One of the physical archives of the Lavender Woman periodical was originally owned by the Atlanta Lesbian Feminist Alliance. When that group dissolved in 1994 it was sold to Duke University. The University of Michigan Joseph A. Labadie Collection has an incomplete archive of Lavender Woman, having all but five of the 26 total issues. Digital archives can be accessed on the Duke Digital Collection and on An Open Access Collection of an Alternative Press, Independent Voices.

Prominent staff members included Susan Edwards, who contributed to all 26 issues. Other women who regularly contributed were Claudia Scott, J.R. Roberts, Bonnie Zimmerman, Leigh Kennedy, Shari Me, Joan E. Nixon, and Muffie Noble.

== Importance ==
Responses to Lavender Woman convey the importance of lesbian publications during a time where the lesbian community was feeling excluded from many different facets of life, such as feminism, their families and society at large. Overall, the feedback consisted of gratitude for the publishing of the paper, and for how the newspaper helped readers to feel less alone in their lives.

In 2017, Lavender Woman was inducted into the Chicago LGBT Hall of Fame, being called "groundbreaking and extraordinary."

== Controversy with a rival publication claiming the name ==
When the Chicago Lesbian Liberation group split from Lavender Woman, it published its own newsletter from 1973 to 1974. Lavender Woman canceled the Chicago Lesbian Liberation's one-page space over a controversial cartoon. In response, the Chicago Lesbian Liberation published two issues of The Original Lavender Woman in September and October 1974, claiming it was the new Lavender Woman collective and even going so far as to tell their distributors they were the Lavender Woman and replacing issues with their own publication. The result was the first significant division in the lesbian periodical publishing community.

== See also ==
- List of lesbian periodicals in the United States
- Lesbian feminism
- Lesbian literature
