= Society for Canadian Women in Science and Technology =

- Founded: 1981
- Type: Professional Organization
- Location: Vancouver, British Columbia
- Region served: Canada.
- Members: 160+
- Revenue
- Endowment: Michael Smith Endowment Fund
- Website: http://www.scwist.ca/

The Society for Canadian Women in Science and Technology (SCWIST), founded in Vancouver, BC in 1981, is a not-for-profit organization that promotes, encourages and empowers women and girls in science, engineering and technology.

== History ==
SCWIST was founded in Vancouver, BC in 1981 by six women: Mary Vickers, Hilda Ching, Abby Schwarz, Mary Jo Duncan, Diana Herbst and Margaret Benston. It was registered as a charity under the federal Income Tax Act in 1984.

In 1983, the Registry of Skilled Women, BC and Yukon was produced. SCWIST also organized the first National Conference on Women in Science and Technology the same year. The members focused on girls and the development of educational programs for them. The program Girls in Science started in 1984 and ran in many communities in BC. The program grew over the years into MS infinity (1990) and Project Tomorrow (1993). Ms infinity's program is still ongoing. It is funded by the Natural Sciences and Engineering Research Council and it inspires young women by introducing them to exciting careers in science and technology. Ms infinity program also offers an e-mentoring program for girls in the 11th and 12th grades.

SCWIST established a first-year achievement award for a female student enrolled in BCIT's full-time technology program in 1986. This award was renamed in honour of Margaret Benston after she died in 1991 at the Margaret Lowe Benston Memorial. The scholarship program expanded over the years.

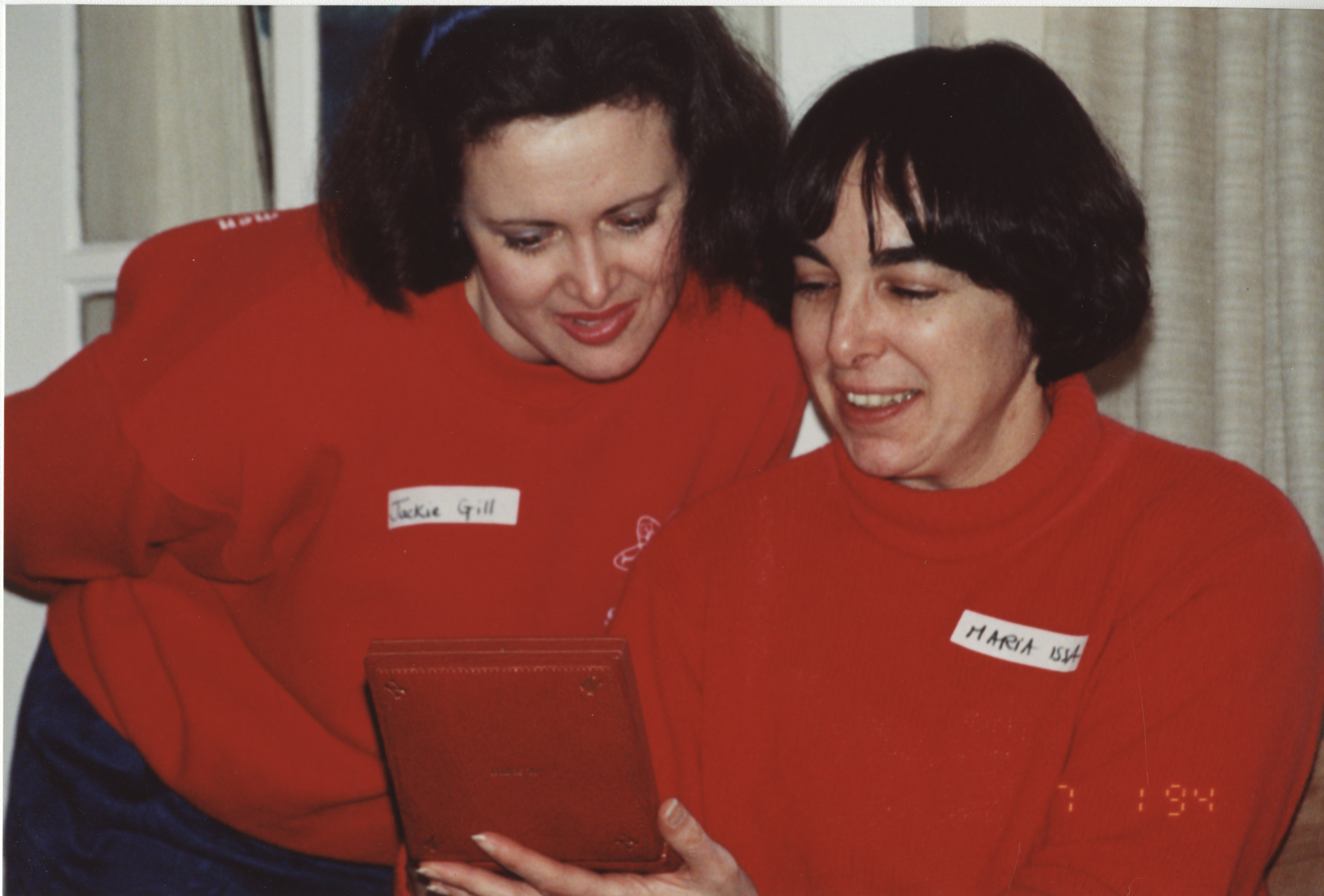
SCWIST members admiring Michael Smith's Nobel Prize

The stability in SCWIST funding was achieved with the establishment of the Michael Smith Endowment Fund in 1993. Half of the prize money from the Nobel Prize as well as the matching amount from different government organizations was put into the Vancouver Foundation's Michael Smith Fund.

The first SCWIST website was launched in 1997. The update and new logos were done in 2012.

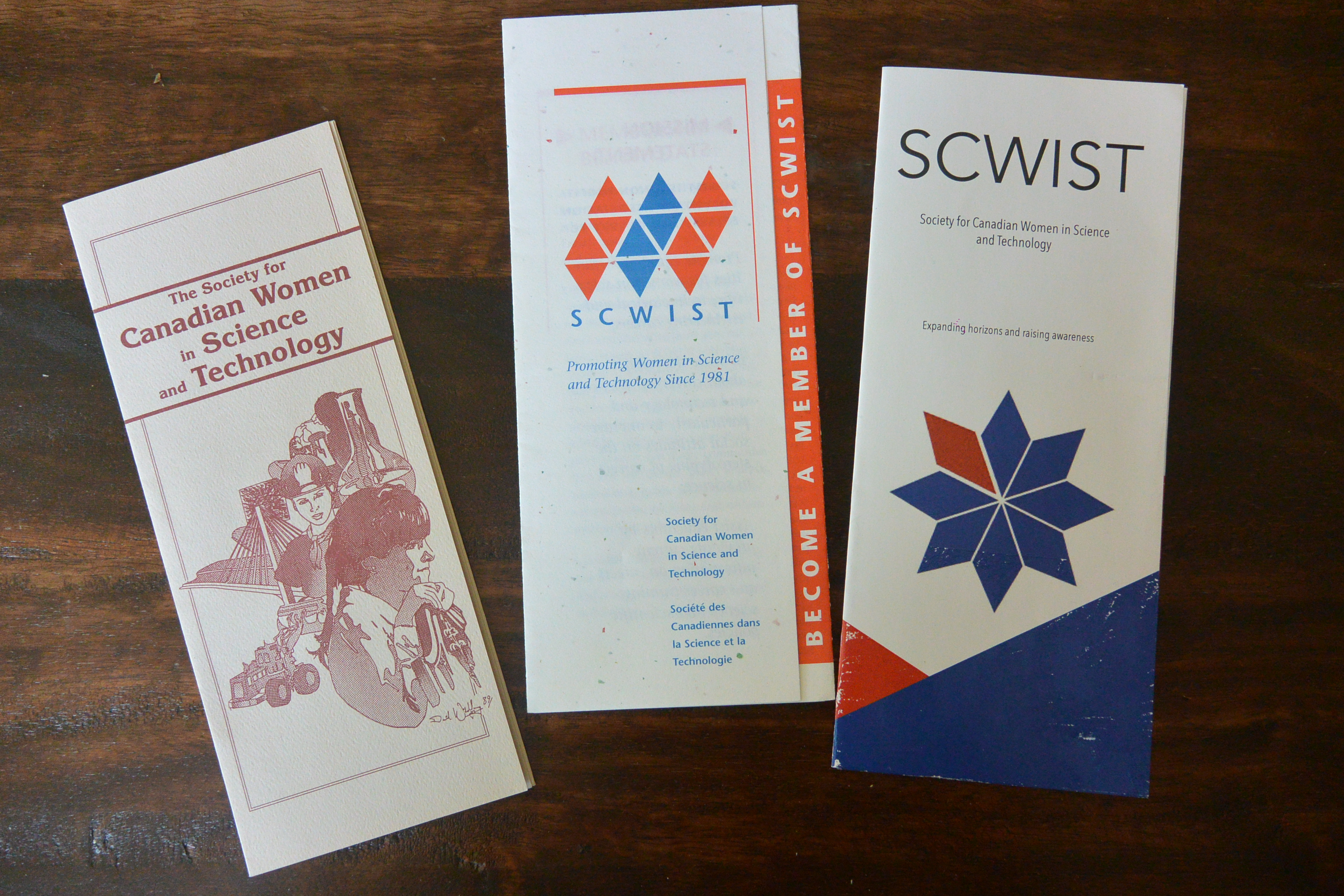
Society for Canadian Women in Science and Technology leaflets changed over the years

The most recent acknowledgement of the SCWIST value was done by Status of Women Canada. This grant funded a launch of an online mentorship network in 2014. This program (named makepossible) was developed to attract, retain and advance women in science and technology.

The Immigrating Women in Science program (IWIS) started in 1999. It offers mentorship and other resources to women who have immigrated to Canada after having trained and established careers in science, engineering and technology in other countries. IWIS is partially funded by the British Columbia Government. IWIS also creates opportunities for skilled immigrants to express their opinions.

Other SCWIST activities include workshops, speaker's events and networking opportunities for women to make valuable academic and industry contacts and develop a sense of community with other women in scientific fields. The prominent event held yearly is XX evening organized in cooperation with Science World (Vancouver). Many other events are organized with the prominent partners such as CIHR Café Scientifique, Creating Connections and many others.

From the six founders in 1981, membership in SCWIST has grown steadily into a network of women providing support to individuals, able to help when faced with obstacles in science and technology careers

== Governance ==
SCWIST is incorporated under the BC Societies Act and governed by a Board of Directors. The Annual General Meeting held each spring and open to all members of the Society, votes on major decisions and elects directors. The Board is headed by the president and meets regularly in Vancouver. The ongoing work of SCWIST is carried out by standing and ad hoc committees and paid employees appointed by the Board.

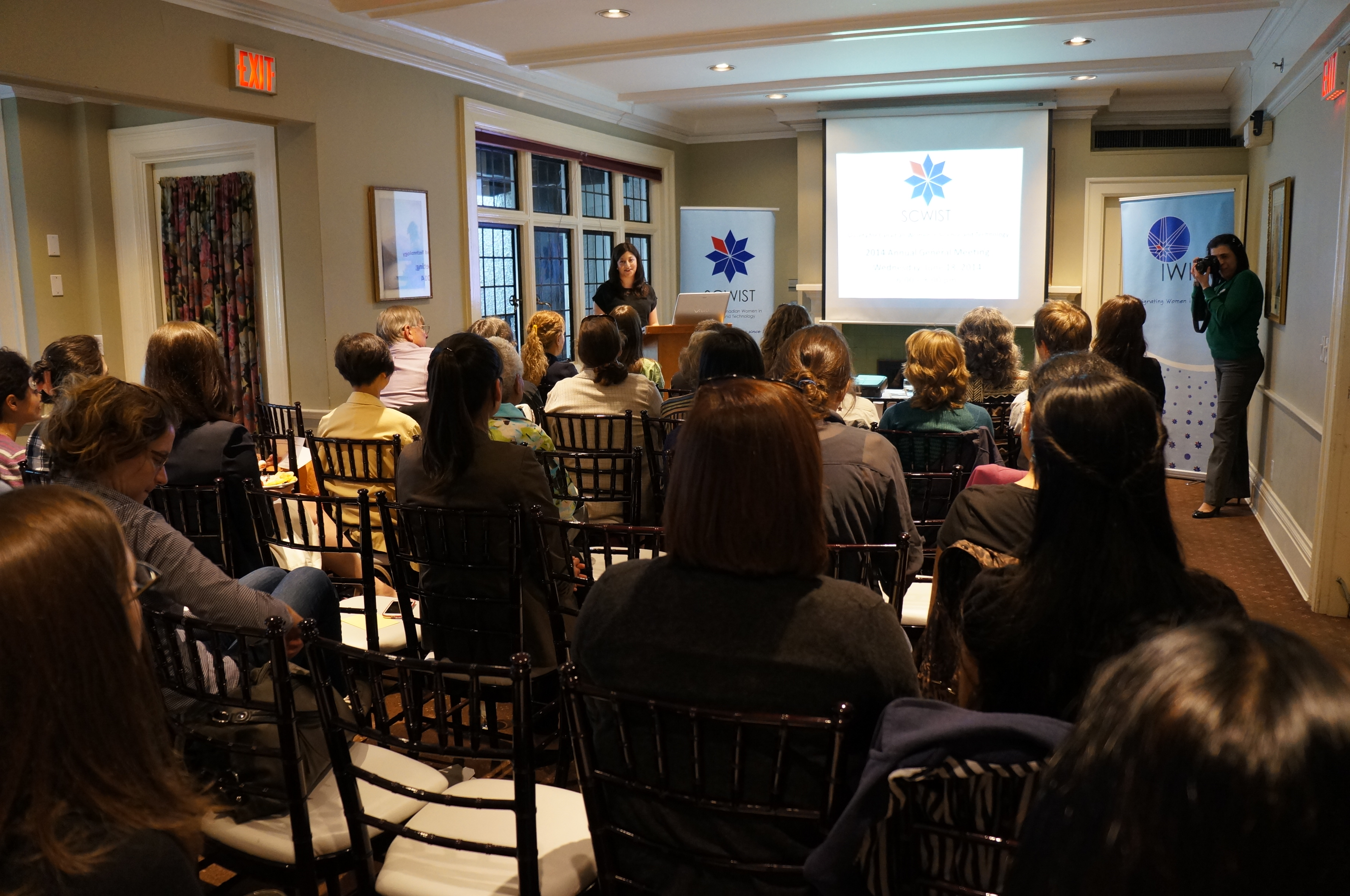
2014 AGM SCWIST (Society for Canadian Women in Science and Technology)

As of July 2015 there are 5 paid employees and the following committees are active:

- Communications
- Events
- Grants
- IWIS
- Membership
- ms infinity
- Strategic Development

== Presidents ==
- Mary Vickers 1981-1983
- Betty Dwyer* 1983-1984
- Hilda Ching* 1984-1986
- Marian Adair* 1986-1987
- Diana Herbst* 1987-1988
- Josefina Gonzales 1988-1989
- Tasoula Berggren 1989-1990
- Penny LeCouteur* 1990-1992
- Jackie Gill 1992-1994
- Hilda Ching* 1994-1995
- Maria Issa* 1995-1996
- Rosalind Kellet 1996-1997
- Hiromi Matsui* 1997-1998
- Sara Swenson* 1998-2000
- Judith Myers 2000-2002
- Dawn McArthur 2002-2003
- Stephanie Smith 2003-2005
- Amanda Smith 2005-2007
- Suzanne Ferenczi 2007-2008
- Elana Brief* 2008-2010
- Anna Stukas 2010-2012
- Maria Issa* 2012-2013
- Rosine Hage-Moussa 2013-2014
- Fariba Pacheleh 2014-2016
- Christin Wiedemann 2016-2018
- Kelly Marciniw 2018-2020
- Paloma Corvalan 2020-2021
- Khristine Carino 2021-2022
- Poh Tan 2022-2023
- Melanie Ratnam 2023-2024
- Tam Pham & Vicki Stronge 2024

Where * denotes honorary membership to SCWIST.

== Advocacy ==
Some members are vocal about current affairs such as women on Canadian one-hundred-dollar note and Canadian Status of Women Committee
