= Vancouver Indo-Chinese Women's Conference =

The Vancouver Indochinese Women's Conference (VICWC) took place in April 1971, where close to a thousand women from Canada and the United States met with Indochinese women in Vancouver, British Columbia, Canada in a protest of the Vietnam War organized by the Voice of Women. There was also a sister conference in Toronto, held from April 9 to 11, 1971. These women came from various backgrounds and cultures; black Chicana/Latina, white, and Indochinese women all participated. This conference was a spinoff from an earlier and smaller Indochinese feminist conference which was held in 1967 to give voice to marginalized women.

The VICWC was divided into four parts over a period of six days, where different women's groups would meet to discuss various women's and antiwar issues. In the first part, the Indochinese women met with the Voice of Women; the second part was a session open to the public; in the third segment, the Indochinese met with Third World women; the fourth part was between Indochinese and women's liberationists, which were mostly white women. The lesbian feminist group "New Morning" also met with Indochinese women during the women's liberation segment.

The Vancouver Women's Caucus was one of the organizing groups of the conference.

== Attendance ==
The North American women who attended the conference identified as either the "Old Friends", "New Friends", or "Third World Women". Third World Women consisted of about 300 delegates and included "Black, Chicano, Asian, and [sic] Native American, and Canadian groups." The Indochinese women whom they met were representatives from anti-colonial struggles in North Vietnam, South Vietnam, and Laos. The "Old Friends" possessed politics that were Communist or "maternalists", and had a long history of friendship with the Vietnamese women. The "New Friends" were younger women who were politically active and of the new left, such as women's liberationists and lesbian feminists. "Third World Women" were of racial groups in the United States, such as Chicana/Latina women, black women, and Southeast Asian women.

The division of the conference into three sections was a result of the existing tensions and conflicting priorities of each faction of women. It was especially important to the "Third World Women"' that they speak privately with the Indochinese women, as they felt they had a unique understanding of their political and social struggles that the "New Friends" and "Old Friends" did not possess.

The Indochinese women ranged in age from 29 to 50, and were from Cambodia, Laos, and North and South Vietnam.
