= Frances Wasserlein =

Feminist, arts community manager and social activist

Frances Wasserlein

Frances Wasserlein (b. July 31, 1946 San Francisco – August 23, 2015 Halfmoon Bay) was a Canadian-American arts community manager and a LGBTQ rights activist living in Canada. She was executive producer of Vancouver Folk Music Festival and box office manager of other festivals and centers in the Vancouver area. She was a board member of a British Columbia Arts Council predecessor from 1996 to 2002.

== Life ==
Wasserlein was born in San Francisco but brought up in Vancouver in Canada.

She received a BA in history from University of British Columbia in 1980, after which she received a Master of Arts in history at Simon Fraser University.

In 1970 she led the Abortion Caravan from Vancouver to Ottawa, and in 1982 she co-founded Women Against Violence Against Women (WAVAW/Rape Relief).

She moved to Halfmoon Bay, British Columbia after marrying Marguerite Kotwitz in 2003. There, she was executive director of Sunshine Coast Community Arts Council from 2008 to 2013 and taught cultural event management at Capilano College.

She died at home in Halfmoon Bay, British Columbia on August 23, 2015.
