= Coalition of Mexican Feminist Women =

Mexican feminist coalition

- Coalición de Mujeres Feministas
- Formation: 1976
- Purpose: Activism
- Origins: Mexico
- Official language: Spanish
- Publication: Cihuat
- Affiliations: Movimento Nacional de Mujeres, Movimento Feminista Mexicano, Colectivo de Mujeres, Movimiento de Liberación de la Mujer, el Grupo Lucha Feminsta and El Colectivo La Revuelta.

The Coalition of Mexican Feminist Women (Coalición de Mujeres Feministas) was an organization established by Mexican feminists in 1976. The Coalición de Mujeres Feministas was formed by six feminist groups: Movimento Nacional de Mujeres (Women's National Movement), Movimento Feminista Mexicano (Mexican Feminists' Movement), Colectivo de Mujeres (Women's Collective), Movimiento de Liberación de la Mujer (Women's Liberation Movement), el Grupo Lucha Feminist (The Feminist Struggle Group) and El Colectivo La Revuelta (The Collective The Revolt). The Coalición de Mujeres Feministas created their own feminist newspaper publication, CIHUAT, that was active from 1977 to 1978.

The Coalición's priority was to decriminalize abortion in Mexico. The Coalición highlighted that the highest rate of abortions were registered in Mexico by women who had at least two children. In September 1977, at the Coalición's second National Conference on Abortion, members drafted a law to decriminalize abortion, the 'Law of Voluntary Motherhood.' They presented the bill to the Chamber of Deputies in December 1977 and demonstrated outside until they were allowed in for an audience with a legislator from the Institutional Revolutionary Party (PRI), which did not sponsor the bill before Congress.

== The United Nations International Women's Year Conference ==
The United Nations International Women’s Year Conference was held in 1975 in Mexico. The conference focused on women’s rights and equality. Much controversy began in Mexico after the conference ended. Many feminist groups had different views the PRI’s true intentions behind the conference. Some believed that the PRI used this conference as a tool to benefit itself and send a message across Mexico, that it supported women's rights and welcomed them within political reform to drive change. MLM (Movimiento de Liberación de Las Mujeres, “Women's Liberation Movement”), for example, believed it was a publicity stunt. Later, about 2000 Mexican women and other women activists across the world believed this was a contribution towards progress within feminism. After the conference, many Mexican feminists realized that unity had to be their main priority in order to successfully achieve the legalization of abortion. This led to the creation of the Coalition of Feminist Women, through the unity of the six feminist groups, Movimento Nacional de Mujeres (Women's National Movement), Movimento Feminista Mexicano (Mexican Feminists' Movement), Colectivo de Mujeres (Women's Collective), Movimiento de Liberación de la Mujer (Women's Liberation Movement), el Grupo Lucha Feminist (The Feminist Struggle Group) and El Colectivo La Revuelta (The Collective The Revolt).

== Revolutionary Family ==
Revolutionary Family was a term used by PRI politicians to showcase how they imagined Mexico and its people. The idealized version of a woman in this framework was a stay-at-home mom, supporting her husband, and most importantly, producing children. PRI believed that women had the sole responsibility of giving birth to future citizens and voters. PRI used Mother’s Day to celebrate and promote the role of women in the revolutionary family and to glorify motherhood.

== Voluntary Motherhood ==
The concept of Voluntary Motherhood defines motherhood as a woman's personal decision, rather than a social, moral, or legal obligation. Voluntary Motherhood originated in the 19th century by U.S. feminist activists. The term was popularized in Mexico by Mujeres en Acción Solidaria (Women in Solidarity Action) (MAS), which was the first recognized group of the “new wave” of feminism in Mexico City. MAS created a public space for future feminist activists to speak out against the PRI’s policies that deepened gender inequality.

The Coalición de Mujeres Feministas adopted this term to strengthen their campaign and push for the decriminalization of abortion. For women, deciding when to enter motherhood was a political and personal issue. With the adoption of this term, they were able to challenge the expectations and responsibilities implemented by society and government. The concept of Voluntary Motherhood was deeply political for the gender roles society assigned. The PRI saw this campaign as a threat, as it was contrary to the idealized idea of a ‘revolutionary family’, which brought women to a confined gender role. PRI saw women at the center of revolutionary family, as they were expected to bring in future citizens. Through this idealized revolutionary family, PRI tried to have control over the beliefs and expected gender roles in Mexico.

== Fighting for change ==
At the Coalición's second National Conference on Abortion, in September 1977, members drafted a bill to decriminalize abortion, the 'Law of Voluntary Motherhood'. They presented the bill to the Chamber of Deputies in December 1977, demonstrating outside until they were allowed in for an audience with a legislator from the Institutional Revolutionary Party. The legislator did not sponsor the bill before Congress.

== Voluntary Motherhood bill ==
The purpose of the Voluntary Motherhood bill was to decriminalize abortion. It emphasized indispensable elements, including free and legal abortion, sex education that was developed specifically for different age groups and social sectors, reliable and inexpensive contraceptives, and rejection of forced sterilization. These demands comprised the basic components of the defense of reproductive and sexual rights in Mexico. For this bill to go through, it needed to be presented to the Cámara de Diputados (Chamber of Deputies). For that to happen, the Coalición did a demonstration outside until they were able to meet with a PRI legislator to receive support from Congress. Despite their efforts, Congress did not take up the bill. The Coalición held a Mother’s Day Protest March.

== Mother's Day Protest march (1978) ==
In 1971, Mujeres en Acción Solidaria (Women in Solidarity Action) (MAS) held a Mother’s Day Protest. The protest focused on challenging the idea of traditional confined gender roles for women, like birthing children, caring for their husbands, and doing housework.

In 1978, after the rejection of the Coalición Voluntary Motherhood Bill, the coalition held another Mother’s Day protest. The protest’s concept was “mujeres elutadas” (“Mourning Women”) This protest was to mourn the deaths of all the women who died from illegal, poorly performed abortions. This was illustrated with the carrying of funeral wreaths at the march. The group marched from Mexico City’s thoroughfares to the Monument to the Mother. The Coalición staged the protest to be on Mother's Day both times because the PRI government had used the holiday to glorify motherhood.

== Second attempt for the Voluntary Motherhood bill ==
From 1978-1980, the Coalición de Mujeres Feministas started collaborating with non-feminist groups to bring in more support to their abortion legislation reform. After four years, in 1981, the coalition drafted another bill to decriminalize abortion, in collaboration with the Partido Comunista Mexicana (the Mexican Communist Party) (PCM) and Frente Nacional por la Liberación y los Derechos de la Mujer (National Front for the Liberation and Rights of Women) (FNALIDM). The Coalition of Feminist Women anticipated that with the help of PCM, there’d be a higher chance of the bill going through. However, it failed once again. After failing to pass legislation for the second time, the coalition and the Voluntary Motherhood campaign came to an end.

== CIHUAT: Voz de la Coalición de Mujeres ==
CIHUAT was the Coalición de Mujeres Feministas's publication. The name CIHUAT derives from the word “cihuatl,” which means “woman” in the Nahuatl tongue. The Coalición's first periodical was published in 1977 and ceased publication in 1978. Only six newspapers were published. The publication shared information among women, fought stereotypes that downplayed feminists, addressed the Voluntary Motherhood Bill, and reported on the work being done by the Coalición's activism. Dr. Mireya Gutierrez, a member of the Mexican Feminist Movement, collaborated with the Women's National Movement, to start the newspaper.

CIHUAT advocated for free and legal abortion, sexual education starting in primary school, and access to contraceptives. This newspaper outlet, was intended to meet the needs of feminists and be a place where people were able to express themselves about the activism of the Coalición. CIHUAT argued to reform laws on women being imprisoned for these issues and eliminate all punishment for voluntary abortion. They proposed affordable abortion procedures and accessible contraceptives. The PRI rejected the ideas that were presented but promoted birth control over the fear of overpopulation.

=== Trayectoria: CIHUAT: Voz de la Coalición de Mujeres. Year 1 No. 1, May 1977 ===
Trayectoria (Trajectory) was the first issue of CIHUAT. It was published in May 1977. It aimed to inform women by sharing feminist ideas and encouraging participation in activism. It indicated that women need a strategic plan to present themselves as human beings rather than objects. These tactics and objectives would help them to challenge oppressive systems such as capitalism and traditional patriarchy that exploit Mexican women. This publication also has various columns addressing other outlets for inequality, ranging from familial gender roles to economic exploitation. The publication was intended to act as a vehicle for the exchange of ideas and information amongst women and called for mobilization through groups like the Coalición de Mujeres. Also in this exchange was the publication of current or future events at the time, resource centers for women, and requests for studies focused on the improvement for rights and livelihoods of Mexican women.

=== Aborto en Mexico: CIHUAT: Voz de la Coalición de Mujeres. Year 1 No. 5, September 1997 ===
Aborto en Mexico (Abortion in Mexico) was the fifth issue of CIHUAT. It was published in September 1977. It consisted of six pages with various illustrations and text columns that address issues such as abortion and the crisis of women being silenced in Mexico at the time. It provided women statistics for the high incidence rate of abortions in Mexico and further highlighted this health and social issue for the country. Further discussion of abortion's legal status and moral implications was published throughout this issue. This issue called for safe and legal abortion. Various artwork and political cartoons were utilized depicting women, the right to their bodies, and aims for coalition building were displayed throughout the article. Other topics discussed were consumer interests of Mexican citizens, gendered challenges in the workforce, and political theory and feminism in Mexican society. Advertisements and invitations to conferences and symposiums for women's studies were noted for women in the Coalición de Mujeres.
