= Mujeres en Acción Solidaria =

Second-wave feminist organization in Mexico

Mujeres en Acción Solidaria (Women in Solidarity Action, MAS) was a Mexican feminist organization active in the early 1970s. It can be seen as the first example of second wave feminism in Mexico.

== History ==
Founders of MAS included Ana Lau Jaiven. The group gained attention with a protest on Mother's Day in 1971, when they demonstrated in front of the Monument to the Mother in Mexico City, bearing a sign reading "PROTESTA CONTRA EL MITO DE LA MADRE" ("Protest against the myth of the mother"). Though the roots of MAS can be traced to the radical inclusivity of the Mexican student movement of 1968, the Tlatelolco massacre of October 1968 had led to a climate of fear at open protest. Concerned friends of the organizers persuaded them to attempt to gain official permission to demonstrate. However, MAS continued with their plans after this permission was denied. On the day, the demonstration coincided with Miss Mexico contestants arriving at the monument to make an offering. The juxtaposition of beauty queens and feminist demonstrators made it onto television news.

In 1974 the group split, transitioning into the Movimiento de la Liberación de Mujeres (Women’s Liberation Movement, MLM). In 1977 it was integrated into the Coalición de Mujeres Feministas (Coalition of Feminist Women), refocussing its activity on reproductive rights.
