= Margarita Sánchez De León =

Puerto Rican LGBTQ activist and minister

Margarita Sánchez De León (born c. 1956) is a Puerto Rican minister and activist for human rights and LGBT rights. She is a Stonewall Award laureate of the Anderson Prize Foundation.

== Biography ==
The University of Puerto Rico awarded her a bachelor's degree in Art and Literature, while the Evangelical Seminary of Puerto Rico awarded her a master's degree in religion. Sánchez De León also completed coursework towards a Ph.D. while a student at the Graduate Theological Foundation. In addition to Spanish, Sánchez De León speaks English and Portuguese. She served as pastor for Metropolitan Community Church congregations in San Juan, Puerto Rico, London, and currently lives in Lisbon, Portugal. Sanchez De Leon also served as executive director of Amnesty International, Section of Puerto Rico. She married Frida Kruijt and they are parents of twins. At the age of 42, she was a 1998 Stonewall Award laureate of the Anderson Prize Foundation.
