= Chicago Lesbian Liberation =

US gay liberation organization

The Chicago Lesbian Liberation (CLL) was a gay liberation organization formed in Chicago for lesbians during the Women's liberation movement (WLM). The group was originally part of an organization for both men and women, but in 1971, the women broke off to form their own group. CLL was involved in publishing a newspaper, Lavender Woman, helping to set up the first Chicago Pride Parade and the first all-women's dance in Chicago.

== History ==
The Chicago Lesbian Liberation (CLL) was part of the Women's liberation movement (WLM). Women in Chicago wanted to be treated as equal to men in their lives and lesbians in the gay liberation movement were more radicalized than gay men in the movement. CLL was initially part of Chicago Gay Liberation (CGL). A woman's caucus of CGL was formed to address lesbian issues. The caucus broke away from the bigger group in 1970 and went on to form the Chicago Lesbian Liberation in 1971. CLL's meetings attracted around seventy women each session as early as 1971. Women in CLL considered the organization as a "set of events," which included consciousness-raising, "actions" and sports leagues. CLL had a center at Liberty Hall and later in the North Side of Chicago.

In June 1970, the organization participated in the first Gay Pride Parade. CLL published an issue of The Feminist Voice which included a page called "The Lavender Woman," in August 1971. Eventually, a publication called Lavender Woman was being published by CLL. Later CLL would split from Lavender Woman and publish their own newsletter between 1973 and 1974. In 1972, CLL and Pride and Prejudice worked together to bring the first all-women's dance to Chicago.

CLL paid attention to issues that might affect minorities within their group and also looked outside their own group to work with others. CLL chose not to lease in a location (W. Armitage Street) that would make it difficult for black women to visit the center. CLL also was willing to work with men in other organizations with similar goals. CLL continued to march in Gay Pride Week in Chicago even after other lesbian groups refused to participate.

== Notable members ==
- Vernita Gray
- Renee C. Hanover
- Marie J. Kuda
