= Abortion Caravan =

Feminist protest movement in Canada

The Abortion Caravan was a feminist protest movement formed by The Vancouver Women's Caucus in 1970 which travelled across Canada from Vancouver to Ottawa to advocate for increased access to legal abortion. A 1969 amendment to the Canadian Criminal Code legalized abortion under certain circumstances (whereas it had previously been considered a criminal offence in all cases). Unhappy with this incremental step, the Abortion Caravan advocated for abortion to be completely removed from the Criminal Code. Upwards of 300 supporters gathered in Ottawa on Parliament Hill and at the residence of the prime minister at the time, Pierre Elliot Trudeau, to protest the amendment. The Abortion Caravan paved the way for future abortion activism as well as helped initiate a revocation of abortion laws in 1988. At the time of the abortion caravan there were also a number of anti-abortion organizations who wished to eliminate access to abortions in Canada. To this day, there are abortion rights and anti-abortion organizations working to promote their positions, including Action Canada's celebrating the 50th anniversary of the 1970 Abortion Caravan.

== History ==
=== Formation ===
The Vancouver Women's Caucus (VWC), originating out of Simon Fraser University, included those who were part of New Left organizations and were either students or worked on university campuses. The VWC had as its focus the issues of equal pay, childcare, birth control and abortion clinics. Their primary focus, access to abortion, led the VWC to adopt the slogan "Free Abortion on Demand", and it was at the first Western Conference on Women's Liberation in 1969, where The Vancouver Women's Caucus proposed the idea of the Abortion Caravan to Ottawa. The Abortion Caravan would protest against the 1969 amendments to section 251 of the Criminal Code, which legalized abortion only in cases where pregnancy threatened the health of the mother. Under the amendment, abortions could only be performed by a licensed physician in an accredited hospital, and only after being approved by a therapeutic abortion committee (T.A.C.) - (a three-member panel of doctors). All other abortions, performed without the approval of a T.A.C. or in free-standing clinics, continued to be illegal and subject to criminal code sanctions. Organizations, like the VWC, felt the T.A.C. process was often proved slow and inaccessible for low-income women and inaccessible to most women. Before the Abortion Caravan set out across Canada, on February 14, 1970, the VWC held a public meeting and theatre performance outside of the Vancouver Courthouse representing women's lack of control over their reproductive health.

=== Journey ===
On April 27, 1970, a group of women from the VWC set out on their journey from Vancouver to Ottawa in "a Volkswagen van with a coffin on top representing all the women who had died from unsafe abortions". The Abortion Caravan was aimed at emulating the On-to-Ottawa Trek of the Depression era. Throughout their travels the Abortion Caravan stopped in Canadian towns including Kamloops, Calgary, Edmonton, Saskatoon, Winnipeg and Toronto. As one of the VWC members retells "every day we had this routine: drive 300 miles, do guerrilla theatre, eat and have a public meeting". The VWC members were communicating with women's groups across Canada and received help with accommodation and food. As well, the Abortion Caravan came across other perspectives, those of anti-abortionist groups and women's groups. While the Caravan was in Thunder Bay, a Catholic group disrupted their meeting and criticized their position. Another women's liberation group from Toronto, The New Feminists, had an alternate point of view than the VWC as they questioned how women's oppression was related to abortion. In the final days of their journey across Canada, the number of participants in Canada increased as they reached Toronto.

This voyage across Canada has been described as a “journey of the heart, the spirits of hundreds of women who could not get into the cars and vans went along with the Caravan, hoping that this time their voices would be heard, and women’s demands for change would be realized”.

The Abortion Caravan arrived in Ottawa on the Mother's Day weekend 1970. A convoy of Canadian women, over five hundred arrived with symbolic images of coat hangers and a black coffin to demand the legalization of unrestricted access to abortion services for all Canadian women.

=== Protests at Parliament Hill and Prime Minister's residence ===
On May 9, 1970, participants of the Abortion Caravan held a meeting in the Railway Committee Room to discuss abortion laws in Canada. However, the Minister of Health, John Munro, the Minister of Justice, John Turner and Prime Minister Pierre Elliot Trudeau among other Members of Parliament did not attend the meeting and this led the Abortion Caravan supporters to declare "war on the Government of Canada", on May 11, 1970, at 3pm. This resulted in hundreds of women from across Canada rallying for two days on Parliament Hill.

Once speeches were given and the meeting in the Railway Committee Room concluded, hundreds of women and men continued their protest towards Pierre Elliot Trudeau's residence at 24 Sussex Drive. At the Prime Minister's residence, guards and RCMP were present; although, they allowed the group to enter the property and occupy the lawn while one of the VWC members, Margo Dunn, gave a speech. Trudeau was also not present at his residence but allowed the women to leave a coffin alongside a garbage bag, knitting needles, Lysol and a vacuum cleaner hose as representative objects used to perform unsafe abortions. Once the women left 24 Sussex Drive, they spend the rest of the day planning their declaration of war on the Canadian government. That night before the 11th, the RCMP, claiming to be the Board of Education, entered the school where the women were staying and searched their belongings.

On May 11, 1970, the Abortion Caravan and a large number of supporters returned to Parliament Hill with the intent to go into the public gallery of the House of Commons and chain themselves to the chairs – an act inspired by the British suffragettes who chained themselves to protest their lack of voting rights. The women had planned to split into two groups: one group would stay outside and march around centennial flame and the other group of approximately thirty women would enter the House of Commons and chain themselves. Women wore traditional feminine clothing to not draw suspicion and carried purses to hide their chains. Once seated, the women quietly chained themselves to their seats, listening intently as, on the House floor, NDP MP Andrew Brewin asked the Minister of Justice John Turner if he would consider reviewing the abortion law; Turner said he doubted the law would be reviewed, closing discussion on the matter.

Just before 3 p.m., one of the women rose from her seat in the gallery and began reciting the Abortion Caravan's "declaration of war", interrupting debate on the floor of the House of Commons. As parliamentary guards approached the woman, a second woman stood up in another area of the gallery and continued to give the group's speech. One by one, the women rose from their seats, adding their voices to the group's speech and chanting "free abortions on demand".

As Parliamentary guards moved through the galleries apprehending the protesters and forcibly removing the women from their seats, one woman reportedly "hurled a water bomb at the government benches before being rushed by security officers and marched from the building"; other women had their chains "removed by bolt-cutting guards". The gallery disturbance caused by activists served as the climax of the Abortion Caravan, provoking the first adjournment of Parliament in its 103-year history, shutting down the House of Commons for over an hour.

The Abortion Caravan brought national attention to the opposition to the 1969 amendments and the movement for “unrestricted access to legal abortion.”

== Trudeau's response ==
Pierre Elliot Trudeau and the Liberal Party of Canada were criticized for not considering the reproductive health needs of women, such as birth control and abortion information and services. Before the Abortion Caravan set out across Canada, the VWC approached Trudeau at the Vancouver Airport to discuss abortion and Trudeau's response was “Obviously [medical professionals] do not want to do abortions”. During the Abortion Caravan's declaration of war in Ottawa, Trudeau was not present; although, once the VWC had returned to Vancouver, they secured a meeting with him which he reached out to organize. During the meeting, when the members of the VWC stated they wanted the “abortion law repealed”, Trudeau's response was “well, go and get the people to vote for it. You have the right to have it, but go and do the job. Go and convince people”.

== 50th Anniversary Project ==
Since the 1970 Abortion Caravan, the fight for abortion access has been on going in order to allow individuals the right to safe and non-discriminatory abortions. In 2020, Action Canada for Sexual Health and Rights created an initiative to continue the fight for equal access to abortions in Canada for all women in remembrance of The Abortion Caravan's fiftieth anniversary. Through this project, Action Canada drew attention to perspectives surrounding abortion access in Canada.

These perspectives include:

- Decolonize abortion care: reproductive justice for Indigenous communities.
- Expanding abortion care training and provision.
- New Brunswick must fully fund abortion: #SaveClinic554.
- International solidarity and abortion access.
- Abortion care includes trans and gender non-binary people.
- Comprehensive sex education and abortion care for youth.
- Countering opponents and destigmatizing abortion in Canada.

== See also ==
- Abortion in Canada
