= Vancouver Women's Caucus =

The Vancouver Women’s Caucus is Canadian feminist organization active from 1968 to 1971. The group founded an abortion awareness campaign which included the Abortion Caravan. The group was also responsible for shutting down Parliament for the first time in Canadian history. Other initiatives include advocacy for working women and hosting a peace conference with Indo-Chinese women.

The group was initially founded in 1968 by students from Simon Fraser University in Burnaby, British Columbia.

== History ==
The Vancouver Women's Caucus (VWC) began in the summer of 1968 as an all female student club called the Feminist Action League. Shortly after, the group was renamed the Vancouver Women's Caucus. They originally were interested in providing services for women on campus. One of their first projects was to provide women with information on birth control and abortions. Although the campus' Health Services made available a Birth Control Handbook made by students at McGill University, the VWC also published a small advertisement in the school newspaper, The Peak, which offered the group's own information on birth control and abortions. The advertisement prompted many phone calls, some even as far away as Saskatchewan; this helped lead the members of the VWC to think larger than just issues on their university campus.

In 1969, the group moved their headquarters from the university campus to downtown Vancouver. This allowed the group to accommodate a wider demographic of members. From there the group started its own newspaper titled The Pedestal, which was a collective that focused on a variety of women's issues. The VWC was involved in many projects and conferences, many of which still involved Simon Fraser University.

Most notably the group was involved in organizing the Abortion Caravan, which was a cross country protest opposing the 1969 amendments to the Criminal Code.

== Values and key issues ==
The VWC was largely influenced by the New Left political movement and was interested in a variety of social issues. The group is closely tied to the politics of the Women's Liberation Movement and in Vancouver at the time that was also tied to having socialist ideologies. In a program written by the group in 1969, they listed areas in which they believed contributed to women's oppression. These areas included jobs, right to equal education and right to choose amongst others.

=== Abortion and reproductive rights ===
The group was very active around these issues. At SFU, they had their Abortion Counseling and Referral Service, in which they helped young women on campus who had found themselves with unwanted pregnancies, as well as gave, out information addressing birth control. They also helped organize the Abortion Caravan, which was a part of their Abortion Campaign. Those who did not go with the caravan stayed in Vancouver where they gave updates to the press about the protest and kept local interest high.

=== Education ===
Within the caucus there was an Education Action Committee. This committee focused on bringing awareness to the inequalities women faced not only while they were attending school, but also as they tried to pursue careers in education. They helped create a panel for a conference at the University of British Columbia focused on organizing teachers.

== Government surveillance ==
In recent years, researchers uncovered the extent to which the group was placed under surveillance by the Canadian government. Despite the surveillance, police were still unprepared for the Abortion Caravan protest when it reached Ottawa. This allowed the protesters the chance to disrupt proceedings in the House of Commons, ultimately shutting down Parliament.

== Membership ==
Members of the group, specifically in the beginning, consisted of mostly of white, Canadian women who had already or were pursuing post-secondary education. Most of the members did not have children, although there were a handful that did. A complete list of members has yet to surface, therefore the list below is incomplete.
