= Abortion in Argentina =

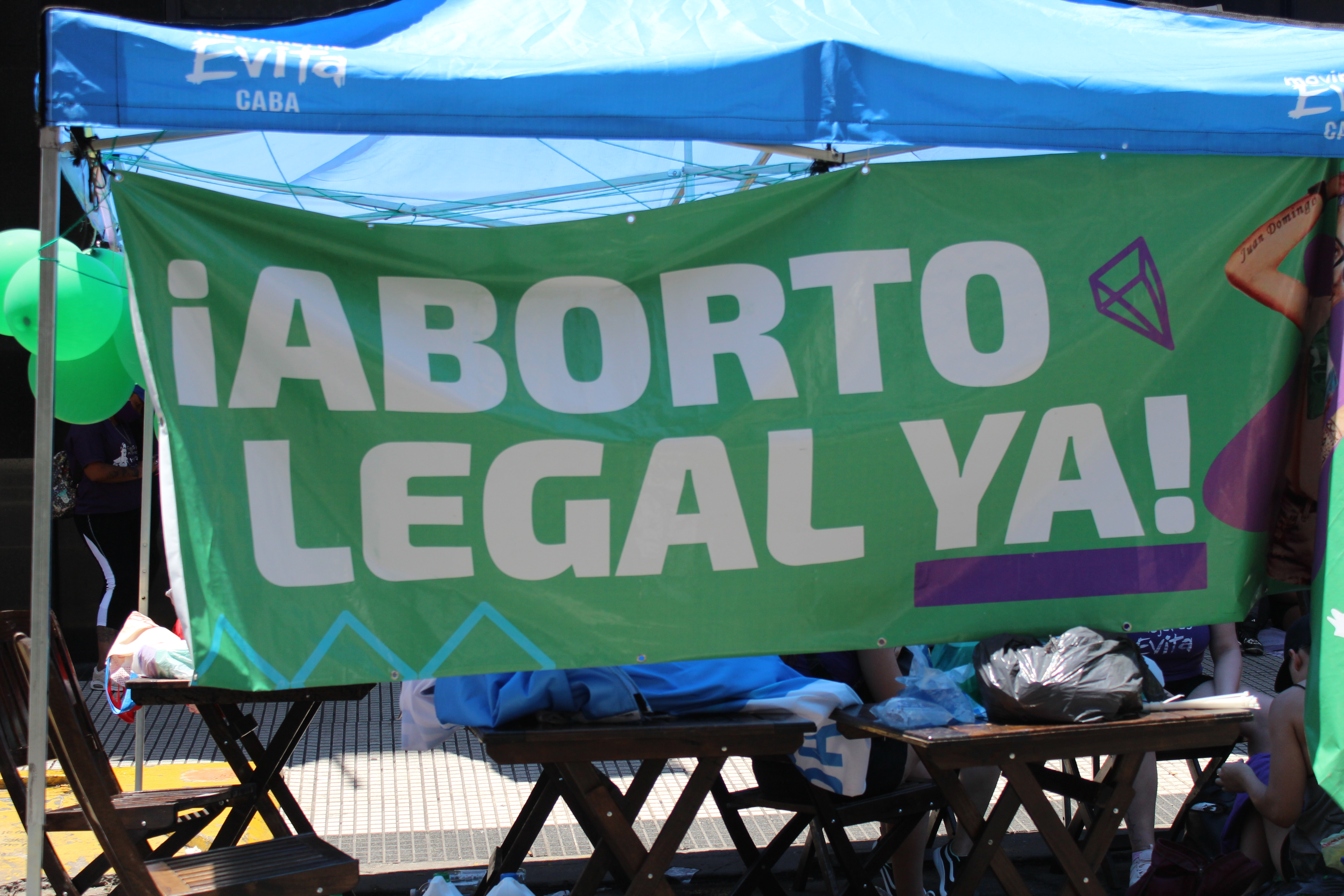
¡Aborto legal ya!, 'Legal abortion now!'—Pro-abortion rights banner at the Argentine Congress, 10 December 2020

Abortion in Argentina is legal as an elective medical procedure during the first 14 weeks from conception. The abortion law was liberalized when the Voluntary Interruption of Pregnancy Bill was passed by the National Congress in December 2020. According to the law, women in Argentina can request the procedure at any public or private health facility. Doctors are legally bound to either perform it or, if they are conscientious objectors, refer the patient to another physician or health facility.

Only three other Latin or South American countries legalized abortion on request nationwide before Argentina did: Cuba in 1965, Guyana in 1995, and Uruguay in 2012. According to polling in 2020, around 44% of Argentines support the legalization of abortion on request; other polls showed 50–60% of Argentines opposed the bill.

The Voluntary Termination of Pregnancy (IVE, by its Spanish acronym) has been demanded by the feminist movement since the 1970s. Although, from 1973 to 1991, maternal deaths decreased, spontaneous and induced abortions rose from 300,000 to 385,931. The spontaneous and induced abortions increased again to 500,000 in 2005. In 2005, the National Campaign for Legal, Safe, and Free Abortion, an organization that leads the cause for abortion legalization in Argentina, was founded. Since 2007, the Campaign has annually submitted an abortion legalization bill to the National Congress, but it was added to the legislative agenda for the first time in 2018, when then-President Mauricio Macri sponsored the debate. The bill was passed by the Chamber of Deputies, but rejected by the Senate. In 2020, newly-elected President Alberto Fernandez fulfilled his campaign promise, and sent a new, government-sponsored bill (slightly different to the one written by the Campaign) for legalizing abortion on request up to the 14th week of pregnancy. It was passed again by the Chamber of Deputies, and, this time, by the Senate, in December 2020.

Prior to 2021, a 1921 law regulated access to, and penalties for, abortions. Any woman that intentionally caused her own abortion, or consented to another person performing one on her, was faced with one to four years of prison. In addition, any participant in the procedure could face up to fifteen years of prison, depending on the consent given by the woman, her eventual death, and the intent of the participant. The same penalty applied to doctors, surgeons, midwives, and pharmacists that induced, or cooperated in the induction of, an abortion, with the addition of a special license withdrawal for two times the length of their sentence. Abortion could be performed legally by a certified doctor if:

- It had been made to avoid a threat to the life or health of the woman, and this danger could not be avoided by other means;
- The pregnancy was a result of rape, or an indecent assault against a feeble-minded or demented woman.

A report from 2005 estimated there were around 370,000 to 520,000 both legal and illegal abortions per year in Argentina. In 2023, Argentina's Ministry of Health reported that 96,664 abortions took place in Argentina in 2022 following legalization in 2021. Many failed abortion attempts and deaths due to them were not recorded as such and/or were not notified to the authorities. Enforcement of anti-abortion legislation was variable and complex; there are multiple NGOs providing women with help to access drugs that can interrupt pregnancies, as well as doctors who openly perform the procedure. The anti-abortion movement, along with the Catholic Church, lobbied against the legalization of abortion, and threatened to take the new abortion law to court.

== Legal and political debate ==
=== Before Legalization ===
The Constitution of Argentina does not establish specific provisions for abortion, but the 1994 reform added constitutional status for a number of international pacts, such as the Pact of San José, which declares the right to life "in general, from the moment of conception". The interpretation of the expression "in general" in certain cases of abortion is still subject to debate.

In 1998 the Menem administration had already aligned with the Holy See in its complete rejection of abortion and contraception. After a visit to the Vatican and an interview with Pope John Paul II, President Carlos Menem passed a decree declaring March 25 the Day of the Unborn Child. The date was due to the Catholic Holy Day of the Annunciation. During the first celebration of the new holiday, in 1999, Menem stated that "the defense of life" was "a priority of [Argentina's] foreign policy". The following president Fernando de la Rúa (1999–2001) was not outspoken about his Catholic belief, but his government effectively kept government policies on abortion unchanged.

President Néstor Kirchner (elected in 2003) professed the Catholic faith but was considered more progressive than his predecessors. In 2005, Health Minister Ginés González García publicly stated his support for the legalization of abortion. Kirchner neither supported nor criticized González García's opinion in public. In a private interview, later, he assured that the law regarding abortion would not be changed during his term. In any case, harsh criticism from the Catholic Church soon shifted the focus to a "war of words" between the religious hierarchy and the national government. Another controversial event in 2005 was the appointment of Carmen Argibay, the first woman ever to be appointed to the Supreme Court of Argentina by a democratic government, as she admitted her support for abortion rights. Anti-abortion organizations, led by the Catholic Church, expressed their opposition to the appointment for this cause.

=== Decriminalization ===
Since the 1990s, gendered economic care was an issue. Between the years of 1995-2000 abortions had increased by 46% in Argentina.

In May 2006, the government made public a project to reform the Penal Code, which includes the de-criminalization of abortion. A commission studied the issue and produced a draft, intended to be presented to Congress. The project was signed by the Secretary of Criminal Policy and Penitentiary Affairs, Alejandro Slokar. On 28 May 2007, a group of 250 NGOs forming the National Campaign for Legal, Safe, and Free Abortion presented a draft legislative bill to the Argentine Chamber of Deputies that would provide unrestricted access to elective abortion up to the 12th week of pregnancy, and allow women to abort after that time in cases of rape, grave fetal malformations, and mental or physical risk to the woman.

In March 2012 the Supreme Court ruled that abortion in case of rape or threat to women's life is legal and that an affidavit of being raped is enough to allow a legal abortion. It also ruled that provincial governments should write protocols for the request and treatment of legal abortions in case of rape or life threat.

In the past couple of decades many countries in Latin America, including Argentina have initiated public health guidelines, legal reforms, and court rulings to have better improve- safe abortions for women. This includes, but not limited to allowing access to abortion within the first trimester. Feminist groups have gone as far as to "set us safe abortion information hotlines", as they continue to advocate for safe health abortions for women in Argentina.

As of 2024, abortion access is still legal up to 14 weeks. Abortion is eligible in cases such as; rape and life of the mother. The specific name of the Law that protects these abortion rights is called "Access to Voluntary Interruption of Pregnancy and Post-abortion care"

Globally, decriminalization has become more popular. As human rights laws change all around the world, including in Argentina, decriminalization is an ongoing battle. According to Johanna B Fine, a human rights activist, general decriminalization and modification for human rights must begin with a national level of abortion, along with policy reforms being looked at frequently These policies and modifications need to be updated and be made fit individually in each nation. In the case of Argentina, there needs to be modification in safe abortion access.

=== The Voluntary Termination of Pregnancy Bill ===
In early 2018, after years of lobbying by different groups, then President Mauricio Macri encouraged the discussion of an abortion law during the 2018 opening of regular sessions of the National Congress of Argentina. He stated that, despite identifying as anti-abortion on this issue, he would not ban a decision by Congress on the matter. Therefore, Congress began debating a bill written by the National Campaign for Legal, Safe, and Free Abortion, that would effectively legalize abortion on request in Argentina and make it available in all hospitals and clinics. The bill was debated alongside other measures to address gender inequality, such as extension of parental leave. On 14 June 2018, the Chamber of Deputies passed the bill with 129 votes for, 125 against and 1 abstention. The proposal divided both the legislators of Cambiemos and the Justicialist Party. However, on 9 August 2018 the bill was rejected by the Senate with 31 votes for, 38 against, and 2 abstentions. Abortion law policies help access to sexual and reproductive rights and education. These activists advocate for safe access to provide an "expanded access" as well as "improving care" for women.

=== The Legalization of Abortion ===
Alberto Fernández, elected President of Argentina in 2019, made legal abortion a central point of his campaign. Days after his inauguration, the Ministry of Health issued a protocol that stated how hospitals and clinics should handle abortion in case of rape. Due to the COVID-19 pandemic, the introduction of the bill was postponed until November 2020. In that month, the Argentine government sent a bill to the National Congress that would legalize elective abortion up to the 14th week of pregnancy, along with a second bill which aimed to protect women that chose to continue with their pregnancy. After the 14th week, abortion would be legal in cases of rape or if the woman's life or health is in danger. This bill was first passed by the Chamber of Deputies, 131 to 117 (with 6 abstentions), after a 20-hour debate, on 11 December 2020, and later by the Senate, 38 to 29 (with 1 abstention), on 30 December 2020. The bill's passing resulted in large-scale celebrations by pro-abortion rights activists who had long campaigned for the right to abortion. Fernández signed the bill into law on 14 January 2021, and it entered into force on 24 January 2021. The Ni una menos movement, "not one (woman) less", which sparked the Green Wave movement, was also a pressure on Fernández to decriminalize abortion.

=== 2024 Bill ===
A bill to outlaw abortion was sent by La Libertad Avanza representative Rocío Bonacci in February 2024, but it failed to receive the support of her own party.

== Abortion protocols ==
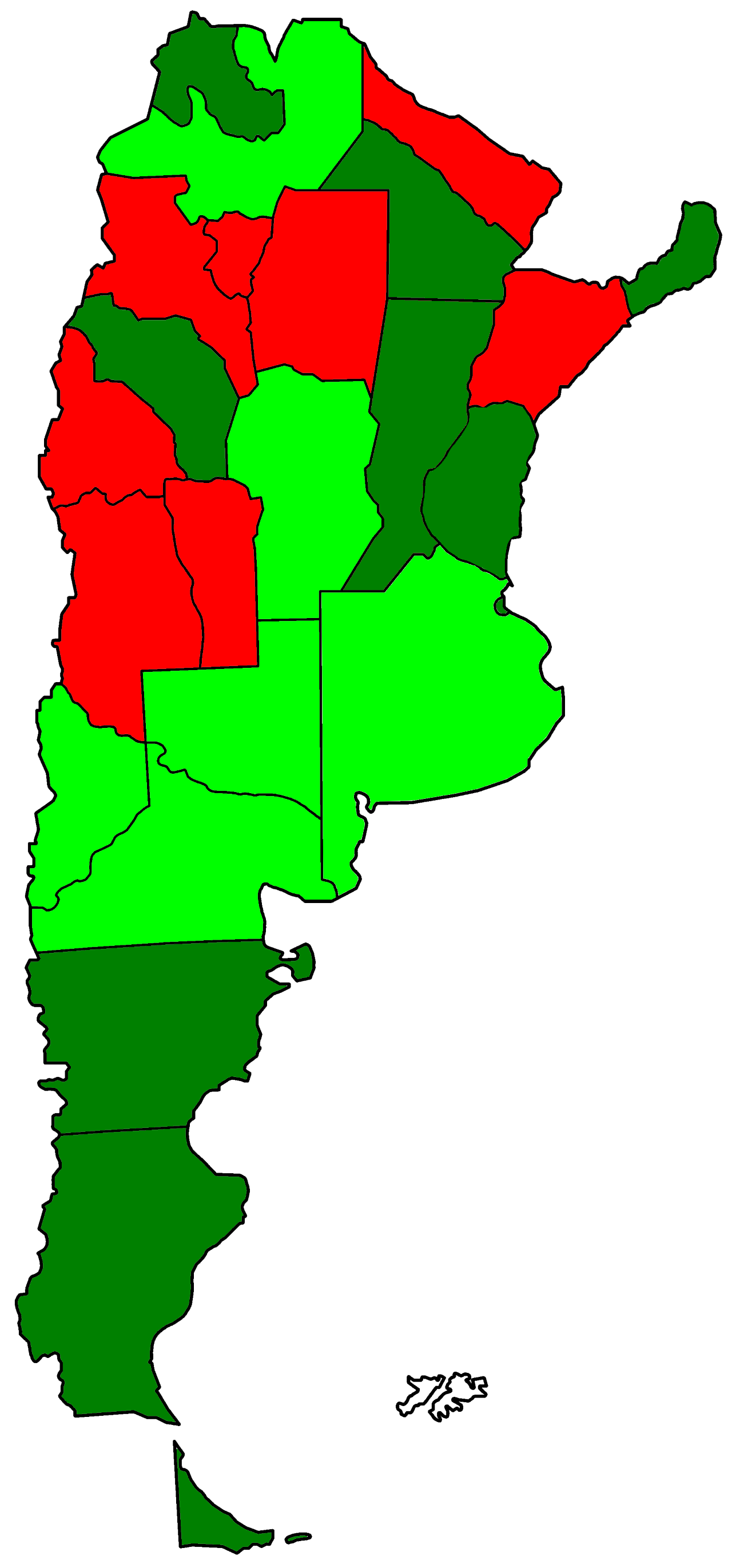
Provinces under the Nation Protocol Sentenced by the court protocol (10) Partially sentenced by the court protocol (6) Without regulation protocols (8)

Before legalization it was often the case that women who may have sought an abortion under the legal provisions of the Penal Code were not appropriately (or at all) informed of this possibility by the attending physicians, or were subject to long delays when they request a legal abortion. Physicians, due to lack of knowledge of the law and fearing legal punishment, often demanded that the patient or her family request judicial authorization before terminating a pregnancy, which sometimes extended the wait beyond the time when it is advisable to abort.

According to research by historian Romina A. Green Rioja, in 2000 a woman in the Buenos Aires Province, died from abortion complications on average every thirteen days. The mortality rate was even higher for women from the poorer Northern provinces. Nationally, 72% of the women who died from abortion or abortion complications were from the Northern Provinces

Class and race had a huge effect on abortion care. Women of higher status are more likely to receive safe access to abortion. Though, this may be true in most cases around the world, it is especially true for Argentina.

Areas highlighted in red are areas where Provinces are not under nation protocols, therefore there are no regulation protocols put in place.

Provinces without regulations are at higher risk for abortion complications. This could be due to the lack of care and safe access. These same Provinces are at higher risk for increased complications and death rates. This is especially true for Provinces that are located further north; such as Buenos Aires.

In March 2007, Buenos Aires Province health authorities released a protocol addressing the provision of legal abortion procedures without delays or need for judicial authorization. The main change regarding previous treatments of abortion was the explicit recognition that any case of rape can be a threat to the psychic health of the victim and thus justify an abortion request.

An abortion protocol, drafted by the National Institute Against Discrimination, Xenophobia and Racism (INADI), was presented to provincial health ministers and legislatures for consideration, starting in May 2007. This protocol includes a series of procedures to be conducted in order to assess an abortion and the maximum permissible time spans for them. It also features a proposal to create a national registry of conscientious objectors.

In June 2007, the legislative body of Rosario, Santa Fe Province, adopted a protocol similar to that of Buenos Aires. Physicians assisting a woman covered by Article 86 of the Penal Code are obligated to explain her condition to the patient, offering the choice of terminating the pregnancy, as well as counseling before and after the abortion. The protocol explicitly forbids the judicialization of the procedure and warns that physicians who delay a legal abortion are liable to administrative sanctions and civil or penal prosecution.

In November 2007, the legislature of La Pampa Province passed an abortion protocol law which included provisions for conscientious objectors and dictated that public hospitals would have to comply with an abortion request in any case. This would have made La Pampa the first district in Argentina to have an abortion protocol with the status of provincial law. The law, however, was vetoed by governor Oscar Mario Jorge as one of his first acts of government, less than three weeks later, with the argument that its new interpretation of previous legislation could be deemed unconstitutional. The protocol was attacked with the same argument by the bishop of Santa Rosa on the day it was first passed.

On 12 December 2019, the Argentina Ministry of Health issued a protocol expanding hospital abortion access to pregnancies which resulted from rape. In addition, the protocol provided that girls as young as 13 years of age can have abortions in such cases without the consent of either of their parents. The protocol also weakened a doctor's ability to refuse to perform such abortions due to personal objection as well.

Gabriella Luchetti, an Argentinian gynecologist argues that abortion care, still must be addressed in Argentina. Although "legal" there are still various women that still struggle with abortion restrictions. Moreover, many of these women still struggle with abortion access. As a general society, there needs to be more care, education, and effort put into women's healthcare in Argentina.

== Social debate ==
Argentina has a robust network of women's organizations whose demands include public access to abortion and contraception, such as the Women's Informative Network of Argentina (RIMA) and Catholic Women for the Right to Choose (Católicas por el Derecho a Decidir). The National Women's Meeting, held annually in different cities, gathering other feminist and pro-abortion groups. The 34th Women's Meeting, held in October 2019 in La Plata, included a 200,000-people demonstration for, among other women's rights, legalization of abortion.

The opposition to abortion is centered on two fronts: the religious one, led by the Catholic Church, and voiced by the ecclesiastical hierarchy and a number of civil organizations, which consider abortion to be murder; and the legal one, represented by those who claim that abortion is forbidden by the Constitution (which overrides the Penal Code).

It is a common belief in Argentina that, the higher the economic status of the pregnant woman, the easier it is for her to get a safe abortion, while poorer women often cannot afford a clandestine procedure under sanitary conditions or post-abortion care. The same is true in many other countries in Latin America. Women living in poverty in this area have less access to reproductive healthcare and contraceptives.

== Public opinion ==
A December 2003 Graciela Romer y Asociados survey found that 30% of Argentines thought that abortion should be allowed "regardless of situation", 47% that it should be allowed "under some circumstances", and 23% that it should not be allowed "regardless of situation".

A survey conducted in early 2005, commissioned by the Argentine branch of the Friedrich-Ebert Foundation, showed that 76% respondents were in favour of legalizing abortion for cases of rape (that is, regardless of the mental capacity of the woman), and that many (69%) also wanted abortion legalized when the fetus suffers from a deformity that will make it impossible for it to survive outside the womb.

A 2007 survey by Mónica Petracci, Doctor in Social Sciences, showed that 37% of Argentines agree with abortion when the woman wishes; another 56% disapprove of the measure.

In a survey conducted in September 2011, non-profit organization Catholics for Choice found that 45% of Argentines were in favor of abortion for any reason in the first twelve weeks. This same poll conducted in September 2011 also suggested that most Argentines favoured abortion being legal when a woman's health or life is at risk (81%), when the pregnancy is a result of rape (80%) or the fetus has severe abnormalities (68%).

A March 2020 survey by the Universidad de San Andrés, found that 43% favor abortion, "regardless of situation". In case of rape, an average of 82% agreed with abortion (with a 95% of non-believers agreed, while in the most religious segment fell to 69%).

== 21st-century cases ==
Several cases of pregnancy resulting from rape and one involving a nonviable fetus have sparked debate about abortion in Argentina since the beginning of the 21st century. In 2001, 25-year-old Luciana Monzón, from Rosario, Santa Fe, discovered that the fetus in her womb, at 16 weeks of gestation, was anencephalic. There was virtually no chance of survival for the baby once it left the womb. Four weeks later, she asked for judicial authorization to terminate the pregnancy. First one judge, and then another, excused themselves from dealing with the request, and the case went to the Supreme Court of Santa Fe, which dictated that the first judge should decide. By that time, however, Monzón had decided to take it to term, because of the delay. The baby was born spontaneously, weighing only 558 grams, and died 45 minutes after birth.

In 2003, a 19-year-old rape victim from Jujuy Province, Romina Tejerina, had a baby in secret, and killed her in a psychotic episode, according to tests. In 2005, she was sentenced to 14 years in prison. She had not accused the rapist, and had managed to conceal her state. Townspeople, public figures, and some politicians expressed support for Tejerina as a victim, and many pointed out that she should have had the chance to resort to abortion. Most notably, the sentence prompted Health Minister Ginés González García to state his support for legal abortion for rape victims.

=== 2006 ===
In 2006, two cases of rape of mentally disabled women became subject of extensive media coverage and debate. One of them involved 19-year-old L.M.R., from Guernica, Buenos Aires Province. Her mother noticed the pregnancy, guessed what had taken place, and went to the public San Martín Hospital in La Plata to request the abortion, allowed under the provisions of the Penal Code. The Ethics Committee of the hospital studied the case, as usual, but the prosecutor of the rape case alerted judge Inés Siro about the upcoming abortion, and Siro blocked it, based on "personal convictions". The block was appealed, and the Supreme Court of Buenos Aires overruled Siro, but the physicians at the hospital excused themselves saying that the pregnancy was now too advanced. The family of the victim was approached by a non-governmental organization that collected money and paid for the mentally disabled woman to have the abortion performed in a private context, by an undisclosed physician.

The other case, which came into the public light at about the same time, was that of a 25-year-old rape victim in Mendoza Province with an acute mental and physical disability. The mother of the victim requested and was granted judicial authorization, but as the pre-surgical tests were being performed at the Luis Lagomaggiore Hospital, the abortion was blocked by an injunction interposed by a Catholic organization. On appeal, the injunction was rejected by the Supreme Court of Mendoza, and the abortion was performed as originally planned.

As a result of both cases, all but two of the provincial Health Ministers issued a joint statement supporting the medical teams and health authorities responsible for the abortions, and expressing their commitment to the law. Minister González García further stated that "there are fanatics that intimidate and threaten" and that "tolerance to fanatical groups must be ended".
