= Reproductive rights in Latin America =

Latin America is home to some of the few countries of the world with a complete ban on abortion and minimal policies on reproductive rights, but it also contains some of the most progressive reproductive rights movements in the world. Debates on reproductive rights in the region occur over abortion, sexual autonomy, reproductive healthcare, and access to contraceptive measures. Modern reproductive rights movements most notably include the Green Wave (Marea Verde), which has led to much reproductive legislation reform. Cuba has been a regional leader for more liberal reproductive laws, while other countries like El Salvador and Honduras have increased restrictions on reproductive rights.

== History ==
=== Pre-colonial ===
Although little information exists on indigenous reproductive rights before the era of colonization, the same issues that persist today were also present back then, and the various diverse tribes of Latin America had varying positions on reproductive rights. Many native women commonly used medicinal herbs and plants to induce abortions such as cinnamon, rosemary, fuzzy maidenhair, garlic, pineable, begonia, cedro, huela de noche, key lime, bitter orange, lemon, coriander, Zarzabacoa comun, epazote, climbing orchid cactus, pegarropa, cotton, scarlet bush, mohintli, oregano, Frangipani alhelí, salab, styrax, feverfew, and hierba amarga. These methods were used when the last Aztec governor, Moctezuma Xocoyotzin, impregnated 150 women and mandated that they get abortions. Another indigenous group, the Wichí, prioritized the mother's health and thus had a tradition of aborting the first pregnancy of each woman to make the next pregnancy safer. In the Mexica society, women were expected to be celibate until they were married and were punished for homosexuality, abortions, and infanticide by death because being a mother was seen has the most important role a woman could have.

=== Colonialism and religious traditions ===
When the European powers colonized Latin America, they brought with them the Catholic Church's beliefs on reproductive rights. Even today, religion in Latin America is characterized by the predominance of Roman Catholicism, although there is also increasing Protestant influence (especially in Central America and Brazil) as well as by the presence of other world religions. Critics of the restrictive abortion laws of Latin America argue that this situation is created by the strong influence of the Catholic church in the region. The Catholic Church believes that the only purpose of sex is for reproduction and thus do not traditionally believe in the use of contraceptives, birth control, or abortion, but rather they encourage abstinence until marriage.

=== International Conference on Population and Development ===
The 1994 International Conference on Population and Development defined reproductive health as noted above. It also defined strategies and goals for advancing such reproductive health and rights in Latin America through what is called the Cairo Programme of Action (CPA). The CPA has three quantitative targets: (1) Reducing overall mortality, which implies an increase in life expectancy, reducing specific mortalities (2) Universal access to education, especially for girls (3) Universal access to reproductive health services, including family planning. Adopted by the region at the conference, some improvements have been seen since the adoption of the CPA. Reproductive rights have become recognized in the constitutions of Bolivia, Ecuador and Venezuela.

=== Millennium Development Goals in Latin America ===
The Millennium Development Goals are a descriptive framework by which to monitor response to eight specific goals. They were announced in the Millennium Declaration in September 2000. Whether or not a country is on track to meeting these goals—in the case of Latin America—is tracked by the Economic Commission for Latin America and the Caribbean (ECLAC). One particular goal in regard to reproductive health, Goal 5, seeks to improve maternal health within the region. The first target of Goal 5 is to reduce the maternal mortality ratio by three quarters between 1990 and 2015. In order to assess the progress towards this goal, ECLAC monitors maternal mortality ratios and the proportion of births attended by skilled health personnel. The second target of Goal 5 is to achieve universal access to reproductive health by 2015. This target is assessed by viewing contraceptive prevalence rates, adolescent birth rates, antenatal care coverage and percentages of unmet need for family planning. In order to achieve these goals, many actions have been taken, including the growing institutionalization of deliveries and the increased number of personnel trained to provide care during childbirth and emergency obstetric care.

=== 1970's feminist movement ===
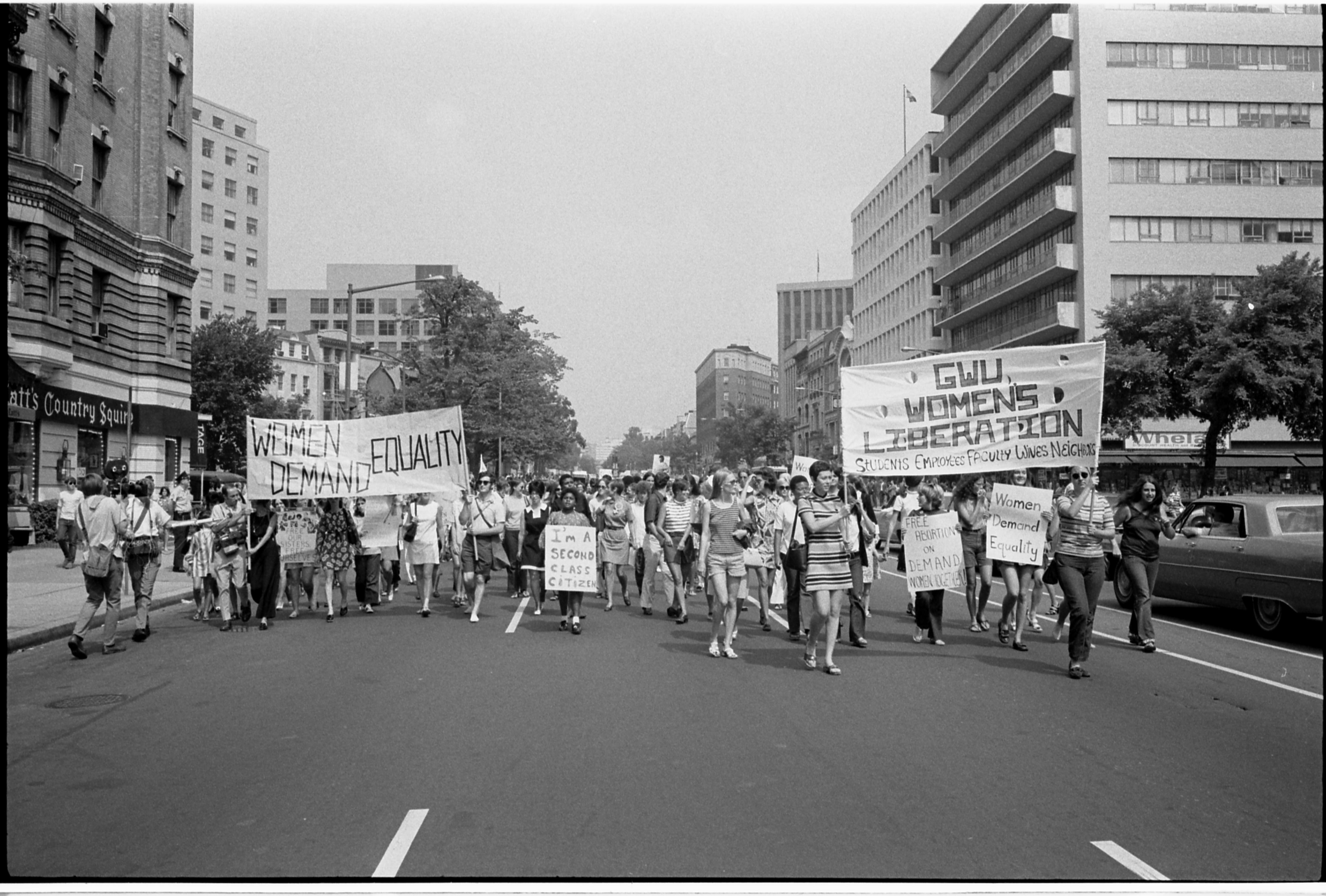
Women march to demand equality in 1970

Women in Latin America first began advocating for abortion rights in the 1970s during the worldwide feminist movement. This movement was propelled by the mass transition of many Latin American governments to democracies, thus opening the door to policy reform. In addition to abortion rights, feminists in this era also advocated for economic independence, equal pay, and political equality. The Mothers and Grandmothers of the Plaza de Mayo in Argentina, the caceroleos in Chile, trade unions in Uruguay, and the Casas de la Mujer (Women's Houses) in Nicaragua worked together with other male-dominated political resistance groups to resist authoritarian oppression and include feminist issues in the political reform. During this period, Cuba acted as an inspiration to many surrounding countries when it became the first Latin American country to legalize access to safe abortions in 1961.

=== Marea verde ===
Inspired by the Mothers of the Plaza de Mayo's use of white scarves during their protests, women in Argentina created the symbol of the green scarf to represent their pro-choice movement in 2003. These distinct green scarves have become characteristic of what is known as the "Marea Verde" or "Green Wave", which has made its way out of Argentina and across Latin America. The color green was chosen to change the narrative around the concept of the "pro-choice" to one that is synonymous with life and growth. This symbol has increased the discussion of reproductive rights not only in Latin America, but around the world.

== Issues ==
=== Abortion ===
Legal grounds for abortion by country: Legal on woman's request; Legally restricted to cases of: Risk to woman's life, her health*, rape*, fetal impairment*, or socioeconomic factors; Risk to woman's life, her health*, rape, or fetal impairment; Risk to woman's life, her health*, or fetal impairment; Risk to woman's life*, her health*, or rape; Risk to woman's life or her health; Risk to woman's life; Illegal with no exceptions; No information; * Does not apply to some countries in that category Note: In some countries, abortion laws are modified by other laws, regulations, legal principles or judicial decisions. This map shows their combined effect as implemented by the authorities.

Abortion is a highly controversial aspect of reproductive rights. While every country in Latin America has differing laws and regulations regarding abortion, the general sentiment is that of disapproval. Abortions in Latin America have had a history of being unsafe and illegal (especially for poor women), with recent improvements in both of those areas. Most of these improvements can be attributed to modern contraception, emergency care, as well as education. Similarly, advocacy and national conflict has grown surrounding abortion rights in Latin America. The region has seen a steady increase of feminist abortion activists, despite religion making the issue taboo.

According to the World Health Organization, in 2008, approximately "4.2 million abortions were conducted in Latin America and the Caribbean, almost three-fourths of them in South America. Virtually all these procedures were illegal and many were unsafe."

In 2011, the number of unsafe abortions in Latin America rose to 4.2 million annually. Unsafe abortions account for a large proportion of maternal deaths. For example, in Argentina unsafe abortions account for 31% of the maternal mortality rate.

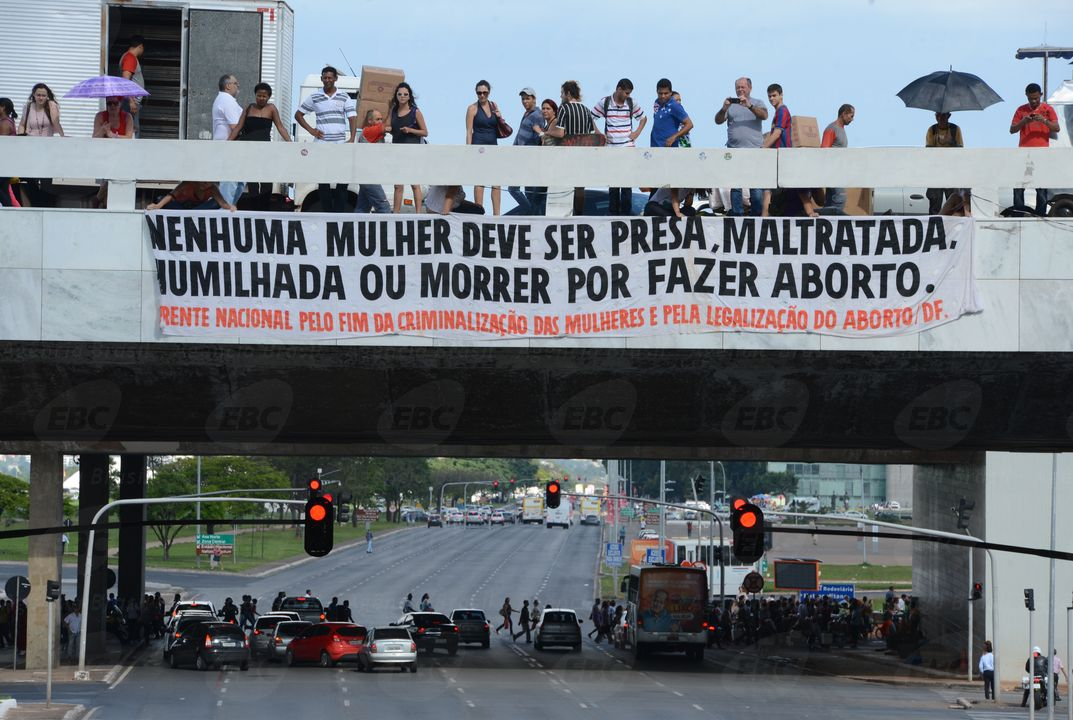
Women in Brazil fight for legalization of safe abortions.

Strict abortion laws are accompanied by strict punishments. For example, in El Salvador, a woman can be jailed for up to 40 years for aborting. These punishments do not take into consideration the cause of the pregnancy, due to the fact that many of the imprisoned women were raped or had involuntary abortions

International legislations also have an effect on abortion rights in Latin America. When U.S. President Donald Trump reinstated the Global Gag Rule on January 23, 2017, he prohibited all U.S. federal money from funding international organizations such as NGOs that "perform or actively promote abortion as a method of family planning".

=== Sexual violence ===
In Latin America, sexual violence including rape, assault, harassment, and femicide are prominent issues that impact a person's sexual and reproductive agency and autonomy. Sexual autonomy means that there is informed and explicit consent, where both parties are aware of the presence and type of birth control being used. Lack of consent leads to more unintended pregnancies. Many regions in Latin America still force young girls to continue their pregnancies to term, even if was conceived through rape. The common patriarchal structures within Latin American households make young girls especially vulnerable to pregnancy by rape perpetuated by a person close to them. These gender dynamics also contribute to widespread intimate partner violence (IPV), with 1 in 4 women having experienced IPV in their lifetime. Latin America also has an 11% rate of non-partner sexual violence, which is almost double the global average. Femicide in Latin America has stayed a pertinent issue over the years due to a variety of factors such as organized crime, gender roles, and ineffective legislation, despite efforts to reduce its occurrence. Despite the fact that all countries in Latin America have a law or policy in place to protect against or punish sexual violence, many of them lack the effectiveness to make a difference.

=== Adolescent maternity and reproductive health ===
Protecting the health of adolescents is an important public health priority. Increased investment in adolescent reproductive health contributes to improving the overall status of women as well as the reduction in poverty among families. Adolescent health must be contextualized within reproductive health and thus public health. Latin American government as a whole did not recognize early pregnancy in adolescents to be an issue until 1984 during the International Conference on Population in Mexico City.

In Latin America, 38% of women become pregnant before the age of 20 and almost 20% of births are to teenage mothers. While an overall universal trend towards earlier average age of menstruation can be seen, the mean age of marriage has declined. This implies that adolescents who are coerced into marriage are unprotected in terms of reproductive rights for longer periods of time. Brazil, Mexico, and the Dominican Republic are recognized as three of the world's worst-affected countries. Furthermore, according to Cindy Paola CM et al., Latin America has a rate of adolescent maternity that is higher than other parts of the world, including developing countries

According to the UN Population Fund, young people have insufficient education and access to information and services that they need in order to make responsible decisions. The importance of education is exemplified by how girls in Latin America who have completed only up to primary education or less have a higher probability of adolescent pregnancy. Further, many young girls are dying because their bodies cannot support pregnancies. Girls under 15 are four times more likely to die during pregnancy or childbirth than an adult woman. For example, facilities are frequently in areas inaccessible to young individuals. For the purpose of privacy from their communities and families, young persons often seek services from facilities not located directly in their own neighborhoods.

There is also a swath of data that is not collected by hospitals on abortions that are particularly "clandestine" / "backstreet". Studies have shown that in several Latin American countries, young single women are at a high risk for abortion which is not reflected by the number of married, older women who were hospitalized for abortions.

=== Genital mutilation ===
While genital mutilation is not a current issue in all Latin American countries, Colombia, Peru, Brazil, and Mexico all have histories of female genital mutilation within indigenous groups. The Embera and Nasa people in Colombia are the only groups in Latin America that are confirmed to still continue the practice. They are known for type 1 genital mutilation, which includes the partial or total removal of the clitoral glans or clitoral hood. This process can cause many health complications and even death. Any kind of female genital mutilation is considered a human rights violation. the United Nations Population Fund is currently fighting to end genital mutilation, but there are currently no laws against genital mutilation in Latin America, unless the mutilation leads to death.

=== Maternal mortality ===
Pregnancy and birth related death can be caused by severe bleeding during and after childbirth, pregnancy-induced high blood pressure, infections, obstructed labor, abortion complications, blood clots, and other factors. In Latin America, almost 8,400 women dies every year from a pregnancy-related complication. These maternal deaths are mostly preventable with quality care, access to contraception, and decreasing disparities in reproductive healthcare. In fact, 9 out of 10 maternal deaths are preventable if the woman is able to access prompt maternal healthcare and contraceptives. Between 1990 and 2013, Barbados, Bolivia, Brazil, the Dominican Republic, Ecuador, El Salvador, Guatemala, Haiti, Honduras, Nicaragua, and Peru significantly reduced their maternal mortality rate, while in Cuba, Guyana, Suriname, and Venezuela, their maternal mortality rates increased. To combat maternal mortality, the Pan American Health Organization launched the "Zero Maternal Deaths. Prevent the preventable" campaign to achieve the goal of less than 30 maternal deaths per 100,000 live births in the Americas.

=== Disparities in healthcare ===
Socioeconomic inequities in Latin America can affect a person's access to sexual education, contraceptives, maternal healthcare, sexual healthcare, risk for maternal morbidity, and risk for sexual violence. Indigenous women in particular face many barriers to accessing reproductive healthcare, resulting in high rates of adolescent pregnancy and unintended pregnancy. While several countries have taken steps towards closing healthcare gaps, inequities persist between and within countries. These healthcare disparities are caused by a variety of social determinants. A woman's neighborhood can determine their housing stability, access to transportation, access to affordable, healthy food, and exposure to air and water pollution. All of these can have significant consequences on a person's health and access to medical care.

=== Diseases ===
There is a distinct lack of information available to people with HIV and other sexually-transmitted infections, creating a stigma around infected individuals. HIV and other STIs can pass from a birth giver to their baby during pregnancy, birth, or breastfeeding. Because of this risk, informed consent requires that sexual partners disclose any STIs they may be positive for.

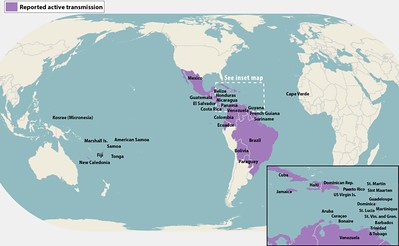
Map of active Zika virus transmission

Besides STDs, the recent Zika outbreak in Latin America has exposed the disparities in healthcare, with pregnant women in poverty most likely to be infected by Zika, which can have devastating effects on the pregnancy and the baby. Women's rights activists advocate for access to safe abortions for women diagnosed with Zika virus to avoid birth defects. Since 69 out of every 1,000 pregnancies in Latin America are unintended, control over a woman's own reproductive rights is an important way to prevent fetal defects and pregnancy complications.

=== Forced sterilization ===
Due to the lack of education around reproductive health in Latin America, many HIV positive women are forced to get sterilizations by their healthcare providers. Misinformation, financial coercion, intimidation, and fear-mongering are also used to deceive women into having sterilization procedures. Some doctors have even been reported to refuse to give care to an HIV-positive woman unless she gets sterilized. Almost a quarter of women who get diagnosed with HIV in Latin America feel pressure to get sterilized in order to avoid transmitting their disease to their potential child. In the early to mid 20th century, doctors in Puerto Rico forced or coerced 1 in 3 women into having sterilizations, claiming it was the only true form of contraception.

=== Transgender women's rights ===
The stigma and discrimination around transgender people in Latin America can significantly increase their susceptibility to sexual violence and decrease their access to testing and treatment for STDs. Because of this lack of resources, the prevalence of HIV in transgender women in Latin America is estimated to be 49% higher than the general population. Additionally, sexual violence perpetrated against transgender women can take various forms including physical harm, verbal harm, psychological harm, and financial harm from respected professionals, strangers, and people they know.

=== Sex education ===
Most schools in Latin American countries teach some form of sexual education, but it is usually only focused to the prevention of sexually transmitted diseases rather than being a comprehensive education about sexual and reproductive rights. Due to the stigma around sex education, teachers in Brazil receive backlash for teaching sex education, despite it being a law to teach it. The lack of information about reproduction and sex causes adolescents to often incorrectly use or not use contraceptives at all. In 2008, the region adopted "Miniseria Declaration, 'Prevention through Education,'" in response to a lack of comprehensive sexuality education. While there have been some setbacks and delays regarding implementation, there have also been key improvements.

=== Access to birth control ===
Despite family planning being one of the most cost-effective means to maintain reproductive rights, 214 million women in developing countries, including Latin American countries are still not using modern contraceptives due to a lack of education and access. Use of modern contraceptives in Latin America has increased to 58% in 2019 giving the region as a whole the highest contraceptive prevalence rate in the developing world. The increased uptake of sexual and reproductive health and family planning services has resulted in a marked drop in total fertility rates from approximately 4.6 children per woman in the 1970s to about 2.5 in 2013. In Latin America, multiple court decisions have granted personhood to fertilized eggs. These court decisions have been responsible for the extreme restrictions on access to emergency contraception within the region.

Research reveals that there are several major barriers that young people face to accessing contraception, primarily with acquiring services, especially in areas that contraceptives have strict laws on contraceptive use. The legal status of oral contraception in Latin America varies by country and can. In 2009 Honduras banned the free distribution and sale of emergency contraceptives. That same year, the Constitutional Court of Peru ordered the Health Ministry to refrain from distributing emergency contraceptives to the public sector. In Costa Rica, where emergency contraceptives are not blatantly prohibited, the popular emergency contraceptive levonorgestrel is not registered as a product, which impedes access to the drug from within the public health system as well as the private market. Although the remaining countries in the region allow for the free distribution of emergency contraceptives, they do not have uniform regulations. In Chile, Colombia and Ecuador, the right to have access to emergency contraceptives is recognized. In Nicaragua and Bolivia, the protocols of their respective health ministries are essentially law. In Argentina and Brazil, the distribution of emergency contraceptives is not legally recognized except in protocols and informative guides.

== Abortion policies ==
=== Caribbean ===
In Antigua and Barbuda, abortion is only legal when it is performed to save the mother's life. In Bahamas, abortion is only allowed in cases of rape, incest, fetal deformity, or endangerment to mother's life. In Barbados, abortion is legal in cases of fetal impairment, or endangerment to mother's life, and is only allowed with an authorized health professional in a specially licensed facility. In Cuba, abortion is allowed at the woman's request up to 12 weeks into the pregnancy, and is only allowed with an authorized health professional in a specially licensed facility. In Dominica, abortion is completely banned. In Dominican Republic, abortion is completely banned. In Grenada, abortion is only legal when it is performed to save the mother's life. In Haiti, abortion is completely banned. In Jamaica, abortion is completely banned. In Saint Kitts and Nevis, abortion is only permitted when the woman's life or health is in danger. In Saint Lucia, abortion is allowed in cases of police-reported rape, incest, or endangerment to mother's life, and is only allowed with an authorized health professional in a specially licensed facility. In Saint Vincent and the Grenadines, abortion is allowed in cases of fetal impairment, rape, incest, or endangerment to mother's life, and is only allowed with an authorized health professional in a specially licensed facility. In Trinidad and Tobago, abortion is only legal when it is performed to save the mother's life.

=== Central America ===
In Belize, abortion is only allowed in cases of fetal impairment or endangerment to mother's life, and is only allowed with the authorization of health professionals. In Costa Rica, abortion is only legal in cases of therapeutic abortion. In El Salvador, abortion is completely banned. In Guatemala, abortion is only legal when it is performed to save mother's life. In Honduras, abortion is completely banned. In Mexico, policies vary by state, with some allowing abortion at mother's request up to 12 or 13 weeks and others allowing in cases or fetal impairment, rape, incest, or endangerment to mother's life. In Nicaragua, abortion is completely banned. In Panama, abortion is allowed in cases of fetal impairment, endangerment to mother's life, or rape.

=== South America ===
In Argentina, abortion is allowed at the woman's request up to 14 weeks into the pregnancy. In Bolivia, abortion is allowed in cases of rape, incest, or endangerment to mother's life. In Brazil, abortion is only allowed in cases of rape or endangerment to mother's life and only allowed with the authorization of a health professional. In Chile, abortion is only allowed in cases of rape or endangerment to mother's life and only allowed with the authorization of a health professional. In Colombia, abortion is allowed at the woman's request up to 24 weeks into the pregnancy; from 24 weeks on, it is allowed only in cases of police-reported rape, incest, or endangerment to mother's life or health. In Ecuador, abortion is allowed in cases of rape or endangerment to mother's life. In Guyana, abortion is allowed at the woman's request up to 8 weeks into the pregnancy, and is only allowed with an authorized health professional in a specially licensed facility. In Paraguay, abortion is only legal when it is performed to save the mother's life. In Peru, abortion is only legal when it is performed to save the mother's life, and is only allowed with an authorized health professional in a specially licensed facility. In Suriname, abortion is only legal when it is performed to save the mother's life. In Uruguay, abortion is allowed at the woman's request up to 12 weeks into the pregnancy and only allowed with the authorization of a health professional. In Venezuela, abortion is only legal when it is performed to save the mother's life.

== See also ==
- Reproductive rights in Brazil
- Lima Consensus (conference)
