= Abortion in Costa Rica =

Abortion in Costa Rica is severely restricted by criminal law. Currently, abortions are allowed in Costa Rica only in order to preserve the life or physical health of the woman. Abortions are illegal in almost all cases, including when the pregnancy is a result of rape or incest and when the foetus has medical problems or birth defects. Both social and economic factors have led to this legal status. It remains unclear whether abortions are legal to preserve the mental health of the woman, though the 2013 United Nations abortion report says Costa Rica does allow abortions concerning the mental health of a woman.

Under the Carlos Alvarado Quesada administration, the discussion of the "Technical Norm" to regulate the already legal therapeutic abortion is a hot issue, as the Evangelical parties (who have a large bloc in the Legislative Assembly) vigorously oppose it.

== Legal issues ==
The Costa Rican Penal Code in its article 121 establishes that no abortion performed to protect the life or health of the mother, carried with the consent of the woman and participation of an authorized physician or obstetrician, can be punished. This is known as "abortion with impunity". However, the lack of a regulatory norm makes application difficult.

Article 93 allows the judges to grant judicial pardon to a woman who has caused her own abortion as a consequence of rape. Articles 118, 119, 120 and 122 punish different types of abortion from three months to ten years of prison depending on the circumstances. In all cases the law increases the penalty if the foetus had more than six months of development.

Induced abortion is classified as a crime in the Penal Code of 1970, included in the crimes against life. Doctors who suspect that a woman has had an abortion are obligated to report them to the Organization of Judicial Investigation (Organizacion de Investigacion Judicial). Punishment varies depending on whether the woman consented or not to the procedure and whether the foetus had reached six months' gestation at the time.

Although the United Nations Human Rights Council recommended in 1999 that Costa Rica should introduce more exceptions to the prohibition of abortions, the actual Costa Rican legislature intended to increase penalties for abortions due to their Roman Catholic background. Laura Chinchilla, strictly opposed to the legalisation of abortion, was president of Costa Rica from 2010 to 2014, during which reforms to the law were not expected.

=== Therapeutic abortion ===
Therapeutic abortion refers to the termination of a pregnancy for medical reasons aimed at protecting the health or life of the pregnant person. This type of abortion is performed when continuing the pregnancy poses a significant risk to the physical or mental well-being of the pregnant individual.

According to the Center for Reproductive Rights (translated from Spanish), therapeutic abortion is legal according to Article 121 of the Penal Code. Although it might be technically allowed, public hospitals, where the majority of Costa Ricans seek medical treatment, generally decline to provide the procedure unless a woman's life is on the line, such as in the situation of an ectopic pregnancy.

Adequate measures have not been taken to guarantee this right. Specifically, there are no specialised protocols or guides that tell health care workers how to proceed with an abortion if the life or physical or mental health of the woman is at risk. There are also no effective judicial or administrative mechanisms through which this procedure can be demanded to be performed."

=== Carlos Alvarado ===
On December 12th 2019, Costa Rica's President Carlos Alvarado issued a technical decree that allowed for therapeutic abortions in the Central American nation, despite opposition from religious and conservative political groups. The measure outlined clearer requirements for medical professionals and enabled the first therapeutic abortions to be performed within six months at public hospitals. Private clinics were also allowed to perform the procedure.

Health Minister Daniel Salas said in a statement in 2019 therapeutic abortions could be performed if three requirements were met:

1) If there is no other medical alternative;

2) If the woman gives consent;

3) After mandatory evaluation by three medical professionals.

Fourteen days prior to this, Costa Rica witnessed a gathering of thousands, marching in support of "Yes to Life!" These demonstrators urged Carlos Alvarado not to bypass the legislative chambers, where lawmakers advocating pro-life positions had the potential to obstruct a new abortion legislation.

Fabricio Alvarado, leader of the opposition, actively participated in the protest and accused the government of attempting to enforce "unlimited abortion" in defiance of the majority's wishes.

Ricardo Salazar, Pastor of the Abundant Life evangelical church, asserted, "Costa Rica is a nation that values life, a country built on the belief in life. Suddenly, through deceitful means, there's an attempt to supplant a law that truly reflects the sentiments of Costa Ricans with an unnecessary one that could legalize abortion."

Bishop José Manuel Garita Herrera of Ciudad Quesada spoke out against the decree and urged respect for both lives- that of the mother and of the child in her womb.

"To doctors, my call is also that, faithful to the principle and vocation to which they have consecrated themselves, allow them to place their gifts at the service of the mother and her son," Bishop Herrera said.

=== Rodrigo Chaves Robles ===
Rodrigo Chaves Robles is Costa Rica's current President and has played a pivotal role in shaping the country's approach to therapeutic abortion.

In 2022 President Rodrigo Chaves Robles took part in a significant meeting with members of the Catholic Episcopal Conference. The discussions centred around the topic of abortion, particularly the therapeutic interruption of pregnancy.This commission, composed of subject experts, representatives from the Ministry of Health, the Costa Rican Social Security Fund (CCSS), medical professionals, and other stakeholders, concluded its assessment on June 20, 2022.

Following the meeting, the newly appointed Minister of Health, Joselyn Chacón, announced a forthcoming review of the technical standard concerning therapeutic abortion. Chacón emphasised that this review, scheduled for June 2022, aimed to ensure that the regulations accurately reflect the government's commitment to prioritising the life of the mother.

Chacón stated that the revision process would involve a commission and comprehensive studies on the subject. She emphasised the alignment of this initiative with the requests made by the bishops during the meeting with President Chaves Robles. Chacón reiterated that the government's stance is not in favour of pro-abortion policies but is steadfast in safeguarding the mother's life.

President Chaves Robles articulated his position on the revision of the technical standard. He highlighted that the primary objective of this review is to eliminate any potential loopholes that might arise. He reiterated his unwavering commitment to ensuring that the standard serves the explicit purpose of regulating situations where a pregnancy jeopardizes the life of the mother.

Chaves Robles acknowledged his limited expertise on the matter but emphasised that any deviations from the core objective of protecting the mother's life would warrant careful examination.

The technical standard, initially signed in December 2019 by then-President Carlos Alvarado, holds paramount importance in the landscape of abortion regulations in Costa Rica. It establishes the framework for the application of therapeutic abortion within the country, outlining the necessary regulations and procedures.

Griselda Ugalde, former president of the College of Nurses and a participant in the commission's work, conveyed that the commission found no need for changes to the document. However, any further progress or action regarding the technical standard is contingent upon the decision of Joselyn Chacón, the Minister of Health.

Griselda Ugalde highlighted the persistence of patriarchal, homophobic, and misogynistic attitudes in Costa Rican society. She acknowledged that despite progress, there may be limited support for therapeutic abortion.

The lack of implementation of the existing norm posed questions about the necessity of the review process. The challenges surrounding personnel training and evaluation processes were noted as factors contributing to the limited application of the standard.

The consensus reached by the commission was that modifications to the technical standard were unnecessary given its evaluation. Larissa Arroyo, a representative for individuals who were compelled to carry unviable pregnancies to term, pointed out that while the technical norm might not be ideal according to international standards, it represents progress within Costa Rica's legal framework.

The possibility of a review process raised concerns about resource allocation and accountability.

== Catholic church ==
The country has a state religion, Roman Catholicism, meaning the Catholic church has an especially prominent place in public institutions like schools and hospitals. The church regularly intervenes in public debates around a variety of issues — like in vitro fertilization, euthanasia, same-sex marriage and abortion.

For example, in 2017 a girl's life story gained attention when her mother publicly revealed the sexual violence the girl had endured from her father. Following this disclosure, Andrea's mental state deteriorated significantly, with her expressing a desire to not continue living due to the trauma. Andrea's mother highlighted her daughter's depression, reduced appetite, severe pregnancy-related nausea, and her adamant unwillingness to proceed with the pregnancy.

Instead of urging the enforcement of Costa Rican abortion law, the media provided a platform for religious figures to express their viewpoints. The public discourse regarding Andrea's case is not framed within a medical or legal context, but rather through a Christian lens. Religious institutions and anti-abortion groups approached Andrea and her mother to discourage them from considering pregnancy termination.

Paola Vega, a deputy in the Costa Rican parliament and one of only three openly pro-choice elected officials, said:

"The whole conversation has become radicalized. People actually argue that if a woman is dying while she's in labour, she has to give birth no matter what happens because it's God's will. She has to give birth, and if she dies and if the baby dies, well, it's God's will. The whole discussion has gotten so much worse, so much more radical."

=== Catholic Church Responds to UN Observations on Abortion in Costa Rica ===
Following a comprehensive 10-day visit to Costa Rica, UN Special Rapporteur on health rights, Tlaleng Mofokeng, has emphasised the country's potential to overcome challenges and achieve truly universal healthcare. During her visit, Mofokeng engaged with a range of stakeholders, including government officials, civil society, healthcare professionals, and marginalised groups.

She underscored the need for a holistic approach to healthcare, focusing not only on access but also on addressing underlying determinants. Mofokeng called for the full recognition of the right to health in Costa Rica's constitution and expressed concerns about the criminalization of abortion, which she deemed to be in violation of human rights standards and medical protocols.

Mofokeng's recommendations include the decriminalisation of abortion, highlighting that such laws restrict autonomy, hinder the patient-doctor relationship, and perpetuate gender discrimination. She proposed a moratorium on enforcing abortion laws and commended Costa Rica for its effective COVID-19 strategies, urging ongoing stakeholder involvement in health policymaking.

Additionally, Mofokeng addressed issues of racism and xenophobia, identifying them as significant obstacles to health rights, as marginalised communities often face systemic violence. While acknowledging Costa Rica's progress, Mofokeng's visit underscored the importance of comprehensive healthcare reform that ensures equitable access for all individuals, especially marginalised groups.

Her report, scheduled for presentation to the UN Human Rights Council in June 2024, will provide comprehensive recommendations to further advance healthcare access and human rights in the country. In response to the call by Tlaleng Mofokeng, the Catholic Church in Costa Rica has voiced its strong opposition.

The Church emphasised the sanctity of human life and rejected the assertion that the restriction of abortion contributes to obstetric violence. The Church questioned the claim that deaths related to obstetrics would have been prevented through total decriminalisation of abortion, and stated that intentionally taking the life of a foetus is the worst form of discrimination a human being can experience.

The Church invoked various norms, including the Political Constitution and agreements safeguarding children's rights, to support their stance. The Foreign Ministry of Costa Rica also responded, highlighting that the prohibition of abortion is deeply rooted in the country's legal principles and constitution. The government expressed disagreement with the UN observations, asserting that the right to life is a fundamental human right enshrined in the country's legal framework.

Tlaleng Mofokeng's visit to Costa Rica revealed various health-related concerns. She noted challenges in the Costa Rican health system, including long wait times for consultations and care, particularly in the Costa Rican Social Security Fund. Mofokeng identified vulnerabilities in specific groups such as people with disabilities, the LGBT population, adolescents, migrants, and indigenous and Afro-descendant peoples.

== Access to Abortion and Availability of Medication ==
Despite the risks posed by clandestine abortions to women's health and well-being, access to safe and legal abortion remains a complex issue in Costa Rica. The limited availability of suitable medical methods and the legal intricacies surrounding the process contribute to the challenges faced by women seeking abortion services.

=== Restricted Access to Medication ===
The drug commonly utilised for abortions, misoprostol, is primarily known by its trade name Cytotec. However, it was initially developed for gastric issues like ulcers, rather than gynecological purposes. Notably, Costa Rica lacks a registered trademark for misoprostol for gynecological use, possibly due to the associated stigma around abortion. Cytotec is not available for over-the-counter purchase and is strictly controlled, requiring a prescription.

=== Legal and Regulatory Factors ===
The restricted availability of Cytotec stems from its key component, misoprostol, which the World Health Organization (WHO) recognizes as a safe element for performing abortions. However, its dual-use nature prompts stringent regulations. The medication can only be provided under a prescription and is available within the Caja Costarricense de Seguro Social (CCSS) for gastrointestinal issues, not for gynecological purposes.

In Costa Rica, there is no officially registered organisation offering misoprostol openly, and any such provision would be unlawful without a prescription. Abortion remains prohibited by the Penal Code (Articles 118 and 119), with the exception of therapeutic abortion under Article 121. Additionally, the law is specific to abortions within Costa Rican territory, and performing an abortion abroad doesn't constitute a crime under Costa Rican jurisdiction.

If a woman receives the medication through mail and performs the abortion within the country, it can be considered a crime. Providers and individuals assisting in the procedure may also face sanctions. Alternative methods to obtain the medication include private consultations with medical professionals or purchasing from websites. The cost can be significant, potentially leading individuals to women's support organizations that offer free access but may involve legal risks.

To promote women's health, the World Health Organization (WHO) advocates for removing regulatory barriers to safe abortion. WHO's guidelines emphasise the importance of dignified, non-stigmatising care that respects women's autonomy and decisions. Ensuring safe abortion care extends beyond medical safety; it involves addressing societal stigmatization and the potential legal repercussions that women may face.

International Safe Abortion Day on September 28 aims to prevent complications and deaths from unsafe clandestine abortions. In Costa Rica, the period from 1997 to 2017 saw over 97,000 cases of women seeking medical care due to complications from incomplete abortions. In 2017 alone, the Caja reported 25 hospitalisations for spontaneous abortions and more than 2,000 for incomplete abortions.

=== Digital Access and Legal Concerns ===
Websites offering misoprostol for abortion-related purposes have emerged in Costa Rica. However, acquiring misoprostol through such channels could potentially breach legal frameworks as it's a prescription-only medication. These online platforms facilitate communication through WhatsApp, inquiring about factors like gestational age and delivery coordination, but purchasing from them can carry legal and safety risks.

The landscape surrounding abortion access in Costa Rica reflects both medical complexities and legal considerations, emphasizing the need for comprehensive and compassionate approaches that prioritize women's health and autonomy.

== Abortion research in Costa Rica ==
Researchers have shown making abortion illegal doesn't decrease its occurrence, but rather makes it more dangerous. There's a scarcity of recent research on abortion in Costa Rica. Activists mainly draw on a 2007 study that estimated 27,000 abortions annually in the country.

Megan Rivers-Moore conducted interviews with individuals who had undergone secretive abortions in Costa Rica. All of the people she interviewed about their clandestine abortions expressed relief at not being pregnant anymore and gratitude to the network of strangers that made it possible. She also noticed abortion is changing in Costa Rica and in Latin America — networks of committed volunteers help pregnant people access mifepristone and misoprostol (abortion pills) in a variety of ways, leading to significantly reduced complications.

== Public opinion ==
According to Planned Parenthood public opinion is heavily influenced by the Roman Catholic Church. Given the influence of Catholic doctrine on public policy and culture, abortion under any circumstance is illegal and understood as murder. Accordingly, almost all doctors will not carry out an abortion for any reason at all.

According to a survey made by the University of Costa Rica whilst most Costa Rican support therapeutic abortion (55%) very few support completely free abortion (only 11%).

The poll showed that 55% support abortion to save the mother's life, against 45% who oppose. 49% supports it in case of non-life threatening health problems against 39%, 43% in case the foetus has life-incompatible malformation versus 49% against, only 29% supports it in case of pregnancy of a child versus 57% against, only 28% in cases of rape against 61% opposing, and only 11% supports only on the woman's request against 78% opposing it. The poll also show that half of Costa Ricans have no knowledge of what therapeutic abortion is, and almost all opposed it. Support is bigger among unreligious people, younger generations and people with higher education.

A 2013-2014 investigation made with focus groups with different religious samples showed that most non-religious Costa Ricans support free abortion on woman's request only, non-practicing Catholics and most non-Christian religious minorities (except for Tibetan Buddhists) support abortion in some cases including for saving the woman's life and health and cases of rape particularly in the case of children, whilst most practicing Catholics, Mainline Protestants and Neo-Pentecostal oppose any kind of abortion even in life threatening situation.

== Activism ==
Despite the consistent presence and historical influence of religious figures on public policy, recent challenges to sexual and reproductive rights have emerged from a changing landscape. The anti-abortion movement reveals significant adaptations and mutations across networks, alliances, strategies, and frameworks.

In October 2022, Costa Rica hosted its inaugural National Conference on Abortion Policy in commemoration of International Safe Abortion Day. The conference aimed to unite participants from various backgrounds to discuss abortion-related experiences, challenges, and knowledge, with a focus on the right to choose. Through an inclusive and participatory approach, the event aimed to collaboratively create an agenda and action plan to advance the cause of legal, safe, and free abortion in Costa Rica.

Organised by local entities like ACCEDER, Aborto Legal Costa Rica, Peras del Olmo, and supported by international organizations such as Women's Link Worldwide and Ipas, the conference aimed to build a stronger network of individuals and organizations with the shared goal of promoting reproductive justice in the country. The event received support from several other groups, including Colectiva por el Derecho a Decidir and CLACAI, who work to end unsafe abortion across Latin America.

The emergence of a young activist movement throughout Latin America, advocating for safe, legal, and cost-free access to abortion, has injected newfound optimism.

Operating under the banner of "educación sexual para decidir, anticonceptivos para no abortar, aborto legal para no morir (sex education to be able to choose, contraceptives to not have to abort, legal abortion so we don't die)", these young feminists have assumed a leading role within a broad and inclusive movement. This movement encompasses individuals with uteruses and utilises gender-neutral language.

Empowered by the immediacy of social media.Activists throughout Latin America have drawn inspiration and momentum from successes like the complete decriminalization of abortion in Argentina in 2020.

In Costa Rica, the spotlight has shifted from abortion due to corruption scandals and the pandemic. However, with elections approaching in February, all presidential candidates have been questioned about their stances on this topic. This has propelled the issue into the political discourse in an unprecedented manner.

== "Rosa" ==
In 2003, a nine-year-old girl living in Costa Rica, known to the media as "Rosa", became pregnant after being a victim of sexual abuse. Consequently, Rosa was left in a state where her physical and emotional state was very delicate. The authorities denied her the opportunity to have an abortion, as they alleged that the consequences of an induced abortion would be worse than her carrying the pregnancy to term. Eventually, Rosa was able to travel to Nicaragua, where, despite much controversy, she had an abortion in a private clinic.

== "Ana" and "Aurora" ==
In 2007, Ana and Aurora, two Costa Rican women denied abortions despite having dangerously malformed foetuses.Aurora, aged 32, shared with La Nación newspaper, "He struggled within my abdomen for weeks, with his lungs exposed outside his body, torn open by my own organs."

The widely recognized international situations involving Ana and Aurora have prompted the Costa Rican government to establish a technical norm. This norm is intended to reinforce legal safeguards for medical professionals who perform abortions to prevent endangering the life and well-being of pregnant women.

They presented their cases to the Inter-American Commission on Human Rights and recounted the agony of carrying foetuses that could never survive birth. They described how their wombs became tombs for their unborn babies, causing immense suffering for both themselves and their foetuses.

== Beatriz v. El Salvador: Implications for Costa Rica ==
The Inter-American Court of Human Rights conducted an open hearing in the Beatriz v. El Salvador case, a significant event that holds potential implications for Costa Rica and other Latin American nations grappling with severe abortion laws. The hearing took place in 2023 on March 22-23 in San José, Costa Rica. The case revolves around Beatriz, who sought to terminate her high-risk pregnancy in 2013 due to threats to her life.

Despite her deteriorating health, she was only granted a belated cesarean section. Tragically, the plaintiffs assert that this led to her death in 2017. The hearing is groundbreaking as it challenges the complete abortion ban, and the court's decision may shape sexual and reproductive rights in the region, especially for women facing restrictive abortion laws.

The Inter-American Court's deliberations on the Beatriz case provide an important reference point for understanding Costa Rica's approach to abortion and its potential impact on broader regional dynamics. The case underscores the significance of legal and human rights frameworks in shaping reproductive rights across Latin America. It sheds light on the complexities faced by women seeking safe and legal abortion services, particularly in countries with stringent abortion laws. The outcome of the case could influence discussions and legal reforms related to abortion access in Costa Rica, prompting a reassessment of the current legal stance and its alignment with human rights principles.

Additionally, the focus on this case highlights Costa Rica's role as the host of the Inter-American Court hearing and its commitment to engaging in conversations around human rights, gender equality, and reproductive health. The outcome of the court's decision could prompt Costa Rica to reflect on its own abortion policies and consider potential adjustments that align with evolving regional standards and human rights norms.

In the broader context of Latin America, the Beatriz case demonstrates the persistent struggle for women's reproductive rights across the region. As the court's ruling approaches, its implications for countries like Costa Rica will underscore the importance of addressing the intersection of legal frameworks, societal attitudes, and women's health in discussions surrounding reproductive rights. The court's decision could serve as a catalyst for continued advocacy and dialogue on abortion legislation in Costa Rica and beyond.

== See also ==
- Reproductive rights in Latin America
