= Sherif Zaki =

American pathologist (1955–2021)

Sherif R. Zaki (November 24, 1955 – November 21, 2021) was an Egyptian-American pathologist. He was the chief of the Centers for Disease Control infectious diseases pathology branch. Sometimes called a "disease detective", his career included research on Ebola outbreaks, Zika virus outbreaks, the 2001 anthrax attacks, Nipah virus, leptospirosis and COVID-19.

== Early life and education ==
Zaki was born in Alexandria, Egypt. He graduated from the Alexandria University School of Medicine in 1978. While undergoing an orthopedic medicine residency, he took an interest in pathology and successfully secured a scholarship to the University of North Carolina at Chapel Hill to pursue his PhD. He relocated once again to Emory University to pursue a joint PhD and residency in experimental pathology.

== Career ==
Zaki joined the Centers for Disease Control and Prevention in 1988. In the early 1990s, Zaki contributed to the discovery that hantaviruses were causing a previously unexplained series of deaths among members of the Navajo Nation. He participated in the processing and identification of the anthrax strain used during the 2001 anthrax attacks. He contributed to research into the use of the experimental antiviral drug remdesivir against the Nipah virus, finding a protective effect in animal trials. During the COVID-19 pandemic, Zaki studied the causes of fatality related to SARS-CoV-2 and the virus' impact on pregnancy.

== Personal life ==
Zaki died from complications after a fall at his home in Atlanta, Georgia on November 21, 2021. His sister is Safa Zaki, the President of Bowdoin College.
