= Abortion in Peru =

Abortion in Peru is illegal except in case of a threat to the life or health of the woman. Abortion has been generally illegal in Peru since 1924. A woman who consents to an abortion can be sentenced to up to two years in prison. A person who performs an illegal abortion can be sentenced to one to six years in prison. About 19% of Peruvian women have had an abortion according to the Pontificia Universidad Catolica del Peru.

== Health risks ==
Despite its illegality, at least 19% of Peruvian women had at least one abortion performed during their life. Abortions in Peru are often conducted in clandestine operations that are easily accessible, though dangerous, as women frequently experience chronic or permanent complications related to the informal procedures. A 2005 survey showed that 17.5% of maternal mortality in Peru was caused by abortion. Secret abortions in Peru resulted with 29,000 hospitalizations and 60 deaths in 2012, costing the nation up to $959 per patient for the treatment of complications, being more costly than adequate family planning policy.

Poor accessibility to safe abortions have increased complications for women who have them performed clandestinely. In Peru, individuals and groups on the internet who assist with abortions provide broad recommendations for procedures that often do not meet international standards. The price for the common abortion drug misoprostol is greatly inflated in Peru due to the legal repercussions facing individuals using the medications for such purposes, with the high prices making the medication inaccessible to the average woman.

== See also ==
- Abortion by country
- Abortion law
- Reproductive rights in Peru
- Reproductive rights in Latin America
