= Viviana Waisman =

American lawyer

- Born: New York City, New York, U.S.
- Education: University of California, Berkeley (BA); UC Hastings College of the Law (JD); University of Oxford (LLM)
- Occupations: Human rights lawyer; Activist
- Years active: 2001–present
- Known for: Founder of Women's Link Worldwide
- Title: President and CEO of Women's Link Worldwide (2001–2022)
- Awards: Human Rights Prize of the General Council of Spanish Lawyers (2016); V Roca Junyent Law and Society Award (2018)

Viviana Waisman (New York) is an American lawyer specializing in women's rights and international human rights law. In 2001, she founded Women's Link Worldwide. She served as president and CEO of Women's Link until 2022, when Jovana Ríos Cisnero became the organization's new CEO. She is currently working on a new initiative called the Gen Equity Institute, which seeks a paradigm shift in the approach to teaching and learning human rights law and in ways to use the law creatively.

== Background ==
Waisman's family originated in Eastern Europe. Her grandparents emigrated from there in the early 20th century and settled in Argentina. Later, her parents were forced to leave Argentina as a result of a coup d'état and emigrated to the United States. Waisman was born in New York and returned with her family to Argentina when she was three years old. Three years later, they returned to New York due to the political instability in Argentina. This early experience as a migrant marked her life and shaped her professional career and her interest in the field of human rights. Waisman earned a Master of Laws degree in International Human Rights Law from Oxford University. She received her Juris Doctor degree from Hastings Law School at the University of California. She also earned a Bachelor of Arts degree in Political Science from the University of California, Berkeley. She worked as a consultant for the United Nations Population Fund, as an attorney for the Center for Reproductive Rights in New York, and as an associate at the law firm of Gray, Cary, Ware and Friendenrich in San Diego, California. In 2001, she founded the international organization Women's Link Worldwide, which uses the power of law to promote social change that advances the rights of women and girls, especially those facing multiple inequalities.

== Awards ==
Waisman was awarded the 2016 Human Rights Prize by the Spanish General Council of the Legal Profession for her fight against injustice and her defense of human rights. This prize is awarded to individuals, institutions, and professionals or media outlets that distinguish themselves through their contribution to the defense of human rights. In 2016, she became a member of Ashoka, an association of social entrepreneurs dedicated to recognizing the impact of individuals in fields such as human rights, economic development, education, employment, the environment, civic engagement, and health. In 2018, she received the V Roca Junyent Law and Society Award on June 22, 2018. This award recognizes the career of individuals dedicated to the defense of Human Rights. That same year, she was included in the Top 100 Women Leaders of Spain list awarded by Mujeresycia, an award that recognizes female talent in different areas of society and their contribution to it.

== Publications ==
- Coordinator and editor: Women of the World: Laws and Policies Affecting Their Reproductive Lives Anglophone Africa (1997)
- Author of de algunos de los capítulos de Mujeres tras las rejas: Ley del Aborto en Chile, un análisis desde los derechos humanos (tr. "chapters of Women Behind Bars: Abortion Law in Chile, an analysis from a human rights perspective") (1998).
- Bridging the Divide: Women's Access to Justice (2002)
- Editor: Reproductive Rights 2000 Moving Forward (2003)
- Human Trafficking: State Obligations to Protect Victims' Rights, the Current Framework and a New Due Diligence Standard (2010)
- The Prosecution of Sexual and Gender Crimes in the National Courts of Argentina (2017).
