= Popular consultation to convene a referendum against decriminalization of abortion =

2013 Uruguayan referendum

A popular consultation to convene a referendum on repealing the law on decriminalization of abortion was held in Uruguay on 23 June 2013. The proposal failed to muster the required popular support.

== Events ==
In 2012, Uruguay decriminalized abortion. Many politicians and advocacy groups protested its legalization. The positions varied across the political spectrum.

Only 8.92% of eligible voters supported the referendum which did not meet the required threshold.

== See also ==
- Abortion in Uruguay
