= Vannesa Rosales =

Venezuelan activist and teacher

Vannesa Rosales-Gautier (born 20 April 1989) is a Venezuelan activist and teacher from Mérida state.

== Detention ==
Rosales has worked as a school teacher and as an advocate for sexual and reproductive rights in the Mérida state. After being accused of providing information and medication to a 13-year-old teenager for the voluntary interruption of her pregnancy, as the result of sexual assault, Rosales was arrested on 12 October 2020 and charged with the crimes of agavillamiento (conspiracy), association to commit a crime and abortion induced by a third party. Although the attacker of the teenager had an arrest warrant, by January 2021 he was still free.

Over 200 national and international organizations demanded that she be guaranteed due process and the right to defense. Additionally, the NGOs demanded that Venezuelan legislation criminalizing abortion be made more flexible, as has been recommended to the Venezuelan State by various human rights organizations, as well as that the persecution of women for accessing the health service cease. According to a statement issued by the NGO 100 % Estrogen, and signed by more than 200 associations, important judicial guarantees provided for in national legislation and international treaties had not been complied with in the criminal proceedings.

The in flagrante delicto hearing was held four days after her arrest, exceeding the 36 hours established by law, under the protection of a deferral presented by the Public Ministry's Office, and 48 hours after her arrest. Her defense attorneys had not been able to have access to the formal accusation made by the Public Prosecutor's Office nor to his file. By 8 January 2021, her lawyers were only allowed to see Vannesa once. On 11 January 2021, Rosales received the substitute measure of house arrest.

== See also ==
- Abortion in Venezuela
