= Abortion in Guatemala =

Abortion in Guatemala is illegal, except when needed to save the woman's life. Abortion was illegal without exception prior to 1973. Congressional Decree 17-73 altered the penal code to allow abortion in cases in which the pregnant woman's life is endangered in September 1973. The procedure must be done by a physician and approved by a second doctor.

Article 3 of Chapter I in Title II of the Constitution of Guatemala grants the right to life from the point of conception. This article states that the government "guarantee and protects human life since its conception, as same as the integrity and security of the person."

== History and general context ==
Articles 133 to 140 in Guatemala's Constitution detail the imprisonment sentences for women and doctors who seek or provide abortion care. The length of the sentences varies based on the context of the abortion. Some factors that affect the sentencing are: whether the involved parties had knowledge of pregnancy, if there was consent of the woman and if violence contributed to the abortion. There is an increase in the severity of punishment for nonconsensual abortions and abortions because of assault. However, abortion is strictly illegal in instances of the preservation of physical health, mental health, rape, incest, fetal impairment, economic or social reasons or by request. Abortion is only permitted in Guatemala to save the woman's life given that all other means of saving her life had been tried. The government has attempted to lower the mortality rates of mothers and infants from induced abortions by advocating for the use of contraception as a preventive measure for an unwanted pregnancy. The method of contraception most commonly used is sterilization, which accounted for 60% of all the contraceptive use in Guatemala in 1995. In 1995, the contraceptive use among married women in Guatemala ages 15–44 was 27% and grew to 43% in 2002. However, unmet need for contraception among women in this age range rose from 19% to 28% from 1987 to 2002, showing that the reproductive health services in Guatemala are insufficient to help the entire population.

=== Current political debate ===
Since 1973, the Guatemalan government has expressed concern over the number of induced abortions. This has led to discussion over the number of health clinics that treat women suffering from complications from an induced abortion. There are one hundred and eighty-three health clinics in Guatemala that treat the effects of an induced abortion. They are mainly concentrated in the Southwest and Metropolitan regions of the country, where abortion rates are the highest. However, the population in these areas is so dense that there are fewer health clinics per woman than there are in other areas of the country. Most areas in Guatemala have twelve to thirteen health clinics per one hundred thousand women, but in the Southwest and Metropolitan regions there are only seven facilities per one hundred thousand women. In some regions, the ratio is as low as four clinics per one hundred thousand women.

On 15 March 2022, Congress decided not to proceed with a law that would have increased penalties for abortion (as well as prohibiting same-sex marriage and restricting speech about sexual topics in schools). President Alejandro Giammattei had said he would veto it.

=== Role of religion ===
Revisiting the abortion law and access to health clinics and contraception in Guatemala can be difficult, given the prominence of Catholicism in the country. In schools, there is little to no teaching on comprehensive sex education because of the influence of the Catholic Church. In 2009, it was estimated that 65–70% of the Guatemalan population was Catholic. Furthermore, the Catholic Church is very politically active. They participate in the Foro Guatemala, established in August 2001, that allows organizations and institutions to discuss issues of national importance. It provides a space for religious groups to voice views on abortion that influence the election and activities of politicians who are responsible for shaping Guatemalan law on abortion. Since the stance of the Catholic Church is conservative on abortion, Guatemala has strict abortion laws.

== Current legal status and punishment ==
The law is divided into eight different articles numbered 133–140. The first article establishes Guatemala's legal definition of abortion as "the death of the product of conception at any time of pregnancy", while the rest address the imprisonment punishments associated with abortion.

Article 134 states that "a woman who causes her abortion or consents to another person causing it, shall be punished with imprisonment of one to three years. If driven for reasons linked intimately to her state that produce undoubted psychic disturbance, the penalty shall be imprisonment of six months to two years".

Article 135 concerns the role of consent in an abortion. If the woman consents to the abortion then the imprisonment term for the woman and the person who provided the service is one to three years. If the abortion is carried out intentionally without the consent of the woman then imprisonment is extended to three to six years. This article also addresses the nature of the abortion, stating that if "violence, threat, or deceit has been employed, the penalty shall be imprisonment of four to eight years".

Article 136 addresses the punishment for the person who incurred the abortion if the woman dies. If she consented and then died the punishment is three to eight years but if she did not consent then imprisonment is four to twelve years.

Article 137 states that an abortion with the consent of the woman and with the support of another doctor is not punishable if the death of the fetus was not intentional and was solely a result of trying to save the life of the mother, given that all other means of saving her were utilized.

Article 138 addresses unintended abortion. If violence occurs and an abortion is unintentionally caused while it is obvious that the victim is pregnant then imprisonment for the person responsible for the violence is one to three years. If there are injuries incurred onto the woman that are more than just an abortion then the length of imprisonment is increased by one third.

Article 139 address negligent abortion which is punished by one to three years' imprisonment given the woman knew she was pregnant.

Article 140 addresses specific aggravation related to abortion and states that "A doctor who, abusing his or her profession, causes the abortion or cooperates in it shall be punished with the penalties provided for in Article 135, with a fine of five hundred to three thousand quetzals, with disqualification of exercising his or her profession for two to five years".

== Effects of illegalization ==
=== Induced abortions and abortion rates ===
In Guatemala, there are around 65,000 induced abortions provided each year, of which around 21,600 require hospitalization for complications. The abortion rate in Guatemala is about 24 per 1,000 women ages 15–49. The abortion rate is slightly higher in the southwest region of Guatemala, which is less developed and consists of a mostly indigenous population, and in metropolitan regions which have a high population concentration. In these areas of the country, abortions occur at a rate of about 29–30 per 1,000 women in the same age range. Nationally, the unintended pregnancy rate is around 66 per 1,000 women, meaning that about half of all unintended pregnancies result in a woman attempting an induced abortion

== Controversy ==
On February 24, 2017, a vessel docked in port of Puerto Quetzal, run by a group called Women on Waves, to provide abortion pills in international waters. The vessel, though it claimed it had permit rights to dock in Guatemala, was forced to leave by the Guatemalan army under orders from President Jimmy Morales and women were kept from boarding. The Guatemalan government justified their actions by stating that they were defending "human life and the laws of the country".

== See also ==
- Abortion law
- Reproductive rights in Latin America
