= Abortion in Mexico =

Legality of elective abortion in Mexico by state: Legal under state law during the first 12 weeks of gestation Illegal under state law but law is not enforced

In Mexico, abortion on request (elective abortion) is legal at the federal level during the first trimester (the first twelve weeks of pregnancy, i.e., the first fifteen weeks LMP). Elective abortion is being gradually legalized at the state level due to rulings by the Supreme Court, and in the meantime, it is available in all states. Abortion beyond the first trimester is available for various legal grounds, such as rape and health, that vary by state.

On 7 September 2021, the Mexican Supreme Court unanimously ruled that penalizing abortion at any stage of pregnancy is unconstitutional, setting a precedent across the country. Abortion has not been a federal crime in Mexico since that date. However, criminal law in Mexico varies by state. Before 2019, abortion had been severely restricted outside of Mexico City, where elective abortion in the first trimester was legalized in 2007. As of May 2025, elective abortion in the first trimester is legal in Mexico City and the states of Oaxaca, Hidalgo, Veracruz, Coahuila, Colima, Baja California, Sinaloa, Guerrero, Baja California Sur, Quintana Roo, Aguascalientes, Puebla, Jalisco, Michoacán, San Luis Potosí, Zacatecas, the State of Mexico, Chiapas, Nayarit, Chihuahua, Campeche, Yucatán, and Tabasco. The Supreme Court has issued judicial orders to Morelos to harmonize their laws. Several northern states have reported people from the United States traveling to Mexico for abortions, including to states such as Nuevo León that have unenforced bans, as there is no residency requirement. However, even in states where abortion is now legal, there continue to be women in pre-trial detention for murder due to spontaneous miscarriage, though the number of such cases has been drastically reduced since 2021.

== History ==
In 1931, fourteen years after the writing of the national Constitution, the Mexican Government addressed abortion by making it illegal, except in the cases when the abortion is caused by the negligence of the mother, continuation of the pregnancy endangers the life of the mother, or in pregnancies resulting from rape.

In 1974, Mexico introduced the Ley General de Población, a law requiring the government to provide free family planning services in all public health clinics, and a National Program for Family Planning to coordinate it. The same year, Mexico amended its constitution to recognize every Mexican citizen's "right to decide freely, in a responsible and informed manner, on the number and spacing of their children." In 1991, the state of Chiapas liberalized the law on abortion.

Until the 1990s, the Mexican government expanded its family planning services to rural areas and less-developed parts of the country, reducing inequalities in family planning and contraceptive provision. Contraceptive use doubled compared to 1976, but the annual rate of increase slowed down in 1992 and has come to a standstill in recent years.

According to data provided by the Guttmacher Institute, in 1996, Mexico had the lowest percentage of women in Latin America who underwent an abortion procedure, at 2.5%. In 2009, Mexico's national abortion rate was at about 38 abortions per 1,000 for women between the ages of 15 and 44, at 3.8%. The rates are important to consider because of Mexico's stringent anti-abortion laws, and so might not be the most accurate representation of the actual data.

In the early 2000s, a prominent pro-choice movement known as Marea Verde gained traction in Mexico and Latin America. Its influence inspired women to speak up and demand change. Between 7 and 9 September 2021, in a unanimous 10-to-0 ruling, the Supreme Court of Justice decriminalized abortion in Coahuila and Sinaloa. Nevertheless, the effects of these rulings are broader, as they set a federal binding precedent: Judges cannot sentence people to jail for either having or assisting in induced abortions, even if local legislations have not changed their criminal laws. The Supreme Court also established that local rules granting protections of "life from conception" were invalid and that access to legal abortions is a fundamental right of women. This historic landmark paves the path for advocates to challenge abortion restrictions in each state.

However, as of 2022, there continue to be women in pre-trial detention for murder due to spontaneous miscarriage, even in states where abortion is legal.

== Legality ==
In Mexico, abortion proceedings fall under local state legislation. On 24 April 2007, the Legislative Assembly of the Federal District (LAFD) reformed Articles 145 to 148 of the Criminal Code and Article 14 of the Health Code, all dealing with abortion; 46 of the 66 members (from five distinct parties) of the LAFD approved the new legislation. This made it one of the most liberal legislations in Latin America, along with Cuba, Uruguay, and Argentina. The changes expanded the previous law, which had allowed legal abortions in four limited circumstances. A landmark Supreme Court decision in 2008 found no legal impediment to an elective abortion in the Mexican Constitution. It stated that "to affirm that there is an absolute constitutional protection of life in gestation would lead to the violation of the fundamental rights of women."

Since the Supreme Court decision, abortion providers have not been prosecuted for carrying out elective abortions in the first trimester. However, some women have been jailed for home or spontaneous abortions. Abortions after the first trimester are allowed for cause, with the details varying by state (e.g., for rape, a risk to life, a risk to health, miscarriage, fetal impairment, etc.). All state penal codes permit late abortion in cases of rape, and as mandated by national law, no police report is needed for cases of rape. All states permit late abortion to save the mother's life except for Guanajuato and Querétaro, which have the most restrictive laws in the nation. Michoacán, Yucatán, and Campeche allow it for socioeconomic hardship, making their laws the most liberal in the country. The previous requirement in Yucatán that the woman already have at least three children was rescinded by the legislation that legalized elective abortion in the first trimester.

Following the decriminalization of abortions in the Distrito Federal, also known as Mexico City, the states of Baja California and San Luis Potosí enacted laws in 2008 bestowing "personhood" rights from the moment of conception. In September 2011, the Supreme Court rejected two actions to overturn the laws passed by the states of Baja California and San Luis Potosí for unconstitutionality. The Court recognized "the power of the state legislature" to enact regulations on the subject. However, their decision does not criminalize or decriminalize abortion in Mexico.

The September 2021 Supreme Court's ruling states that embryos cannot have the same rights and protections as any born person. Fetuses have protections that increment with time but will never be ahead of the reproductive freedom of the pregnant woman. It also declared that clandestine abortions put the lives of women at risk, create inequality, and produce unnecessary fears over health professionals (doctors and nurses). Thus, the illegality of abortion contravenes Article 4 of the Mexican Constitution, which allows reproductive rights and access to health services to any Mexican citizen.

This decriminalization is the first step towards legalization. Just like same-sex marriage, each of the 28 local legislations that do not allow safe and free abortions on request will now be forced to change their laws. Each state will establish the frame of time (weeks or months of the pregnancy) to have access to an elective abortion. Many NGOs like GIRE have declared they will push for the twelve-week frame, just like in Mexico City, Oaxaca, Hidalgo, and Veracruz. If local legislation does not change anything, the Supreme Court could intervene, declaring unconstitutionality (like in Coahuila and Sinaloa in September 2021) and pushing even more for legalization. Also, amparos would be automatically granted to any citizen that wants to exercise their right to abortion in those states that have not changed the law.

After this last ruling, public institutions like the Instituto de la Defensoría Pública Federal declared they would help all those women in any state, under prosecution or in jail, accused of any criminal charge related to induced abortion. In Mexico, Supreme Court rulings are not retroactive, except when human rights are involved. Local attorneys in those states that have not changed their laws could still prosecute people who have undergone abortions, especially those more conservative. However, judges will not whatsoever declare them guilty. Some hard-line conservative judges may still try to incarcerate someone. However, that case would escalate to higher judicial institutions that would automatically invalidate the sentence, and the judge would be heavily punished for human rights violations. In other words, it's socially and legally unethical for a judge to incarcerate a woman who underwent an abortion in Mexico.

=== State law and court decisions ===
The Supreme Court of Justice of the Nation ruled on 7 August 2019 that rape victims have the right to receive abortions in public hospitals. Girls younger than 12 need parental permission.

On 25 September 2019, Oaxaca became the second state, after Mexico City, to decriminalize abortion up to 12 weeks of pregnancy. The vote in the state legislature was 24 in favor and 12 against. It is estimated that before decriminalization, 9,000 illegal abortions were performed in Oaxaca every year, 17% of them on women 20 or younger. Abortion was the third cause of maternal mortality, and there were 20 women in prison for illegal abortions.

In October 2019, Las Comisiones Unidas de Procuración y Administración de Justicia y de Igualdad de Género (The United Commissions for the Procuration and Administration of Justice and Gender Equality) in Puebla voted against decriminalization of abortion and legalization of same-sex marriage. The penalty for abortion was reduced from five years to one year. Most of the legislators were elected by the Juntos Haremos Historia coalition, and Marcelo García Almaguer of the National Action Party called out members of Morena for doublespeak since they call themselves "progressives" yet voted to support the criminalization of women.

In September 2021, the Supreme Court of Justice of the Nation ordered the state of Coahuila (articles 196, 198, and 199) and Sinaloa (article 4 Bis A) to remove sanctions and restrictions for abortion from its criminal code and local Constitution, respectively. This decision stems from 2017 when former Attorney General Raúl Cervantes challenged the constitutionality of both laws. That same day, the Government of the state of Coahuila ordered the immediate liberation of all women imprisoned on pre-trial detention. Those women with a previous sentence will be released with the aid of an amparo.

Responding to a 2023 request for information on the number of women in detention for the crime of abortion, the states of Aguascalientes, Guanajuato, and Oaxaca reported one each, and Nayarit reported two. Abortion was legal at the time in Oaxaca. Baja California, Chiapas, Coahuila, Colima, Guerrero, Jalisco, Mexico City, Morelos, Nuevo León, Quintana Roo, San Luis Potosí, Sinaloa, Tabasco, Tamaulipas, Tlaxcala, Veracruz and Zacatecas reported there were none in those states. The other states did not respond or requested more time.

As of April 2025, Morelos is in contempt of court for not legalizing abortion by the mandated deadline of December 2024. The state scheduled a vote for 7 February after being fined by the court; previously, it did not have the votes to pass the legislation. Nayarit and Yucatán legalized it on 24 January and 9 April, respectively, but they also missed a December deadline.

==== Timeline ====
Legalization of abortion on request in the first 12 weeks of pregnancy
Federal entity	Date of enactment/ruling	Date effective	Legalization method	Details
Aguascalientes	30 August 2023	30 August 2023	Judicial decision	Ruling of the Supreme Court
Aguascalientes	14 December 2023	28 December 2023	Legislative statute	Passed by the Congress of Aguascalientes
Baja California	29 October 2021	13 November 2021	Legislative statute	Passed by the Congress of Baja California
Baja California Sur	2 June 2022	15 June 2022	Legislative statute	Passed by the Congress of Baja California Sur
Campeche	25 February 2025	26 February 2025	Legislative statute	Passed by the Congress of Campeche
Chiapas	26 November 2024	28 November 2024	Legislative statute	Passed by the Congress of Chiapas
(Chihuahua (state)) Chihuahua	30 January 2025	30 January 2025	Judicial decision	Ruling of the Supreme Court
Coahuila	7 September 2021	7 September 2021	Judicial decision	Ruling of the Supreme Court
Colima	1 December 2021	11 December 2021	Constitutional amendment and legislative statute	Passed by the Congress of Colima
Guerrero	17 May 2022	21 May 2022	Legislative statute	Passed by the Congress of Guerrero
(Hidalgo (state)) Hidalgo	30 June 2021	7 July 2021	Legislative statute	Passed by the Congress of Hidalgo
Jalisco	4 October 2024	9 October 2024	Legislative statute	Passed by the Congress of Jalisco
State of Mexico	25 November 2024	7 December 2024	Legislative statute	Passed by the Congress of the State of México
Mexico City	24 April 2007	27 April 2007	Legislative statute	Passed by the Legislative Assembly of Mexico City
Michoacán	10 October 2024	12 October 2024	Legislative statute	Passed by the Congress of Michoacán
Nayarit	24 January 2025	27 January 2025	Legislative statute	Passed by the Congress of Nayarit
Oaxaca	25 September 2019	25 October 2019	Legislative statute and constitutional amendment	Passed by the Congress of Oaxaca
Puebla	15 July 2024	15 August 2024	Legislative statute	Passed by the Congress of Puebla
Quintana Roo	26 October 2022	29 October 2022	Legislative statute	Passed by the Congress of Quintana Roo
San Luis Potosí	7 November 2024	13 November 2024	Legislative statute	Passed by the Congress of San Luis Potosí
Sinaloa	9 March 2022	9 April 2022	Constitutional amendment and legislative statute	Passed by the Congress of Sinaloa
Tabasco	15 May 2025	18 May 2025	Legislative statute	Passed by the Congress of Tabasco
Veracruz	20 July 2021	21 July 2021	Legislative statute	Passed by the Congress of Veracruz
Yucatán	9 April 2025	8 May 2025	Legislative statute	Passed by the Congress of Yucatán
Zacatecas	20 November 2024	1 December 2024	Legislative statute	Passed by the Congress of Zacatecas

=== Influence from CEDAW ===
The Convention on the Elimination of All Forms of Discrimination Against Women (CEDAW) was created to eliminate discrimination against women in both the private and public sectors. While within the treaty itself, there is no mention or use of the word "abortion," CEDAW has made clear that abortion restrictions are to be viewed as a form of discrimination against women. CEDAW, therefore, encourages the international community to reduce restrictions or outright legalize abortions.

Mexico is a party to CEDAW, meaning not only has Mexico signed CEDAW but has also ratified it (or, in other words, incorporated the treaty into the nation's domestic laws). As a party to CEDAW, this allows the CEDAW committee to monitor and review Mexico's policies and practices that affect women's rights. The CEDAW Committee's recommendations to the Mexican State in 2006 specifically mention these issues. As of September 2021, Mexico City, Oaxaca, Veracruz, and Hidalgo allow abortions with few restrictions, and with Mexico's Supreme Court's recent ruling, Coahuila, another Mexican state, must move towards decriminalizing abortion.

=== Effects of legislation ===
With the new legislation, the law redefines the term abortion. An abortion is the legal termination of a pregnancy of 13 weeks of gestation or more. During the first 12 weeks of gestation, the procedure is labeled the "legal termination of pregnancy." In addition, pregnancy was officially defined as beginning when the embryo is implanted in the endometrium. This helps to determine gestational age, and, according to the research team of María Sánchez Fuentes, "implicitly legitimizes any post-coital contraceptive method, including emergency contraception ... and assisted reproduction (including infertility treatments such as IVF) and stem-cell research". Women charged with having an illegal abortion have their sentences reduced, and the penalty for forcing a woman to have an abortion against her own will, which includes her partner or a physician, is increased. If physical violence is involved, the penalty is even higher. Furthermore, the law explicitly states that sexual and reproductive health is a priority in health services to prevent unwanted pregnancies and sexually transmitted infections (STIs).

According to an unofficial report by the organization Grupo de Información en Reproducción Elegida (GIRE), between 2009 and 2011, 679 women were charged with the crime of abortion in the interior of the country. In the report, GIRE states that having legislation for each entity makes "access to abortion a matter of social injustice and gender discrimination." According to the Omisión e Indiferencia: Derechos reproductivos en México (Omission and Indifference: Reproductive Rights in Mexico) presented by GIRE, only women with economic resources and information can travel to Mexico City to have an abortion "without the risk of being persecuted for committing a crime or do it in precarious conditions." Although there are no official figures on clandestine abortions in the country, GIRE estimated that in 2009, 159,000 women were rushed to a hospital for complications of unsafe and illegal abortions.

==== Impact on health and the economy ====
Research done by María Sánchez Fuentes et al. concludes that the health and economic costs of unsafe abortion are very high, in common with other preventable illnesses. Moreover, those costs are higher for poor women because only women with financial means and sufficient information can access abortion under safe medical conditions in Mexico or travel to foreign countries where abortion is legal. After the amendments to the abortion law in 2007, abortion services are now free of charge in public hospitals for Mexico City residents, who account for approximately one-quarter of the country's population and are available for a moderate fee for women from other states or countries.

Before the passage of the amendments to the abortion law, many Mexican women would buy herbs from the market and try dangerous home versions of abortion to end their unwanted pregnancies. Women also resorted to purchasing prescription drugs obtained from pharmacists without a doctor's signature that would induce an abortion. Moreover, some women even ingested large doses of medications for arthritis and gastritis, available over the counter, which can cause miscarriages. All of these methods are significantly dangerous, and most are illegal.

The fifth leading cause of maternal mortality in Mexico is illegal, unsafe abortion. A significant proportion of poor and young women are forced to risk their health and lives in the conditions under which many clandestine abortions are practiced. This highlights the costs of unsafe abortion to the public health system. In addition, women who undergo unsafe abortions and suffer complications or death represent the fourth highest cause of hospital admissions in Mexico's public hospitals. The Department of Health statistics show that in Mexico City, maternal mortality has been reduced significantly since the passage of the new law.

During 2008, the public health sector, under Mexico City's Department of Health, carried out 13,057 legal abortions, compared to 66 abortions between 2002 and 2007, when the legal indications were restricted to the four circumstances of rape, danger to the woman's life and health and congenital malformations. At the end of April 2007, the city's Department of Health started providing first-trimester abortions free of charge to the estimated 43 percent of women residing in Mexico City with no public health insurance.

== Demographics and public opinion ==
A 2008 study funded by the National Population Council (CONAPO), El Colegio de México, and the Guttmacher Institute estimated 880,000 abortions carried out annually, with an average of 33 abortions a year for every 1,000 women between the ages of 15 and 44. However, such studies are speculative—as abortion is highly restricted and reliable data is not readily available—with some estimates ranging as low as 297,000 abortions per year.

By 19 January 2011, 52,484 abortions had been carried out in Mexico City since its decriminalization in 2007, where some 85 percent of the gynecologists in the city's public hospitals have declared themselves conscientious objectors. Among the petitioners, 78% were residents, 21% were living out of state, and 1% were foreigners from countries such as Germany, Argentina, and Canada. As for their age, 0.6% were between 11 and 14, 47.6% were between 18 and 24, 22% were between 25 and 29, 13% were between 30 and 34, and 2.7% were between 40 and 44 years old. More than half were single.

As of April 2012, roughly 78,544 women had undergone free legal terminations of pregnancy (LTP) without significant complications—an average of 15,709 per year since the law passed in 2007. According to the United Nations, more than 500,000 Mexican women seek illegal abortions every year, with more than 2,000 dying from botched or unsafe procedures.

=== Political community ===
In the 2006 presidential election, the conservative candidate from the PAN, Felipe Calderón, won the election by an "infinitesimal percentage, and the progressive PRD candidate, Andrés Manuel López Obrador, claimed fraud." An article by Sánchez Fuentes et al. suggested that this caused polarization between the two parties and within Mexican society in general. Since the PRD lost the presidential election but maintained control of the local legislature and Mayor's Office in Mexico City, they demonstrated the differences between the left- and right-wing parties in the reproductive-rights context by supporting the change in the law.

In 2007, the legal proposal to decriminalize abortion, led by the PRI, was introduced in the Mexico City Legislative Assembly (LAFD). In this Mexico City abortion reform, "the policy community (including the center-left political parties; the Mexico City government, represented by the Mayor's Office; the local Ministry of Health; and the local Human Rights Ombudsman), along with academics, opinion leaders, and leading scientists, was very much united, and vocal in support of decriminalization." Mexico City's then-Head of Government Marcelo Ebrard, from the PRD, declared, "This is a women's cause, but it is also the city's cause." Manifestations of support for the bill came in public announcements by public figures printed in national newspapers, which are a key means of influencing public opinion and debate in Mexico, and via press declarations and interviews, as suggested. A public announcement published on 17 April 2007 by the Academy of Bioethics outlined why decriminalizing up to 12 weeks was not contradictory to scientific evidence. It affirmed that "an embryo at this stage has not developed a cerebral cortex or nerve endings, does not feel pain, and is not a human being or person." Sánchez Fuentes et al. concluded that this bioethics perspective influenced the discourse surrounding the debate.

On 31 December 2020, President Andrés Manuel López Obrador from Morena proposed that the government sponsor a consultation among the nation's women regarding the legalization of abortion. After Mexico's Supreme Court ruling, President López Obrador remained noncommittal on the subject and stated: "If it's already at the Supreme Court, then let it be resolved there."

=== Anti-abortion movement by the Catholic Church ===
Knowing the potential involvement of the Catholic Church in this reform, the Mexico City Legislative Assembly (LAFD) framed abortion as a necessary protection for women, particularly impoverished women. This was meant to resonate particularly with the predominantly Catholic population, religious interest groups, and Catholic healthcare professionals. While public opinion in Mexico City is generally in favor of legal abortion, the negotiation with devout as well as conscientiously objecting doctors and nurses was proven difficult. Their religious faith had a significant impact on the deliberations because of Catholics' view of abortion as a sin.

The Catholic Church has led the anti-abortion movement in Mexico. The Church remains influential in Mexico, and in any discussion of abortion, the government discusses the reactions and policies of the Church. It is also the Church's influence that has guided the debate towards a public health rationale rather than a reproductive choice rationale—staying away from a pro-choice stance. After the law was passed in April 2007, the Catholic Church collected 70,000 signatures supporting an abortion referendum.

Under Articles 6 and 24, the Mexican constitution protects citizens' freedom of religion. During the first few weeks after the law passed in 2007, many doctors and nurses did not partake in abortions, citing their Catholic faith. The LAFD dealt with the Church's influence on public hospitals and their employees by reinforcing the reforms made in the Robles law (the law permitting abortion to be legal in Mexico City and requiring, in Article 14 Bis 6 of the Health Law, that once again hospitals must have non-objecting doctors on call for abortions). The Robles Law uses language that makes it clear that the right to object on religious grounds is not absolute and that the woman's right to receive the abortion trumps the doctor's right to object where no non-objecting doctor can be located. Furthermore, Article 14 Bis 3 established the Clinical Commission for Evaluation to ensure that doctors were performing abortions and that every time a woman requests information about an abortion, it is recorded by an independent, centralized body of the government. Former Secretary of Health Manuel Mondragón y Kalb, under the Head of Government of Mexico City, Marcelo Ebrard, ensured that abortions were readily available to women who sought them under the legal circumstances. Essentially, the law incorporates a conscientious objection exemption for health care providers and similarly requires that hospitals then provide a woman with an alternate provider who will perform the abortion.

Furthermore, the separation of Church and state is enshrined in the Mexican Reform Laws of 1859, and some attempts by the Church to influence abortion law were illegal. The significant separation of Church and state did not permit religious reasoning to be the primary influence on policies. Still, the Catholic Church threatened to prohibit the individuals supporting the policy from attending any religious sanctions and ceremonies.

According to Sánchez Fuentes et al., more than 80 percent of the women who have sought services are Catholic and formally educated, claiming to help destigmatize abortion and influence public opinion.

=== Surveys ===
- In a May 2005 Consulta Mitofsky survey, when asked, "Would you agree or disagree with the legalization of abortion in Mexico?" 51% of poll takers said they would disagree, 47.9% would agree, and 1.1% were unsure.
- A November 2005 IMO survey found that 73.4% of Mexicans think abortion should not be legalized, while 11.2% think it should.
- A January 2007 Consulta Mitofsky poll examined attitudes toward birth control methods in Mexico, asking, "Currently, there are many methods meant to prevent or terminate a pregnancy. In general, do you agree with the following methods?" 32.1% of respondents stated that they agreed with abortion.
- A March 2007 Parametría survey compared the opinions of people living in Mexico City with those living throughout the rest of the country, asking, "Do you agree or disagree with allowing women to have an abortion without being penalized if the procedure takes place within the first 14 weeks of a pregnancy?" In Mexico City, 44% said they "agree," 38% said they "disagree," 14% said they "neither" agree nor disagree, and 3% said they were "not sure." Throughout the rest of Mexico, 58% of those surveyed said that they "disagree," 23% that they "agree," 15% that they "neither" agree nor disagree, and 4% that they are "not sure."
- According to a survey in August 2021 made by El Financiero (one of Mexico's leading daily newspapers) and Nación321, asking, "Do you agree or disagree with women's right to abortion allowed by law?": 53% of the total population said they "disagree," and 45% said they 'agree.' Regarding gender, 45% of men and 46% of women said they 'agree.' Regarding age, 54% of people between 18 and 29, 53% between 30 and 49, and 30% of people older than 50 said they 'agree.' Regarding the level of education, 56% of people with higher education and 36% with basic education said they 'agree.' Regarding income, 48% of those higher to middle-high, whilst 41% of those lower to middle-low said they 'agreed.' The survey shows the trend since February 2019.

== See also ==
- Mexico City policy
- Law of Mexico
- Verónica Cruz Sánchez
- Reproductive rights in Latin America
