= Abortion in Belize =

Abortion in Belize is restricted by criminal law, but permitted under certain conditions.

== Statistics ==
As of 2017, the most recent statistics available regarding abortion in Belize are from 1996. During that year, 2,603 abortions were reported, along with 6,678 live births. 5% of hospitalizations were due to abortion during that year, making it the fourth highest cause of hospitalization.

Due to legal restrictions against abortion, as well as its significant financial cost, illegal abortions are common in Belize, especially for low-income women. In 1998, an estimated one in seven maternal deaths in Belize were due to unsafe, illegal abortions.

== Legal status ==
Abortion in Belize is governed by sections 108–110 of the Criminal Code (enacted December 1980). Abortion is considered a criminal offense except when performed by a registered medical practitioner under certain conditions. The sentence for performing an illegal abortion in Belize is life imprisonment.

Abortion is permitted under the following circumstances:

- To protect the life of the mother
- To protect the physical or mental health of the mother or any existing children of her family
- If there is substantial risk that the child will be severely handicapped

In addition, the law states that "account may be taken of the pregnant woman's actual or reasonably foreseeable environment", suggesting that abortions can be performed on socioeconomic grounds. Belize does not provide an explicit exception for pregnancies that are the result of rape or incest.

== See also ==
- Reproductive rights in Latin America
