= Abortion in Uruguay =

Abortion in Uruguay is legal on request before twelve weeks of gestation, after a five-day reflection period. Abortion has been legalized in Uruguay since 2012.

== Legislation ==
Prior to legalization, the punishment for having an abortion was 3 to 12 months in prison, while performing an abortion was punishable by 6 to 24 months in prison. A judge could mitigate the pregnant woman's sentence in certain circumstances. These included economic hardship, risk for the woman's life, rape, or family honor.

On November 11, 2008, the Senate voted 17 to 13 to support a bill which decriminalized abortion. This bill was vetoed by President Tabaré Vázquez on November 14 of the same year.

In December 2011, the Senate voted 17 to 14 to support a bill which would decriminalize abortion in their country. The bill would allow abortion after 12 weeks (fetal age 10 weeks) in cases of rape or incest. President Jose Mujica has said he would sign the bill if it passed the Chamber of Deputies. The Chamber of Deputies later passed the bill.

== History ==
Abortion was made illegal in Uruguay in 1938. The Catholic church arrived in Uruguay during colonial times and was a contributing factor to the prohibition. During the reform of Uruguay's government system towards the end of the civil wars, it was largely two populist parties and political armies that wanted to form a democracy. However, this limited legislative progress as the consensus primarily worked on common ground and traditional topics avoiding topics outside those bounds.

In 2004, a team of professionals including gynecologists, midwives, psychologists, nurses and social workers founded a group called Iniciativas Sanitarias ("Health Initiatives"). As part of a larger goal to promote sexual rights and abortion as a "human right", they focused on unintended or "unwanted" pregnancies and their consequences. They say that women should not have to pay for abortion of the unborn child's life with their own lives, and that pregnant women have a right to health information and emotional support, as well as post-abortion medical care. Their group aims to provide both respect and confidentiality.

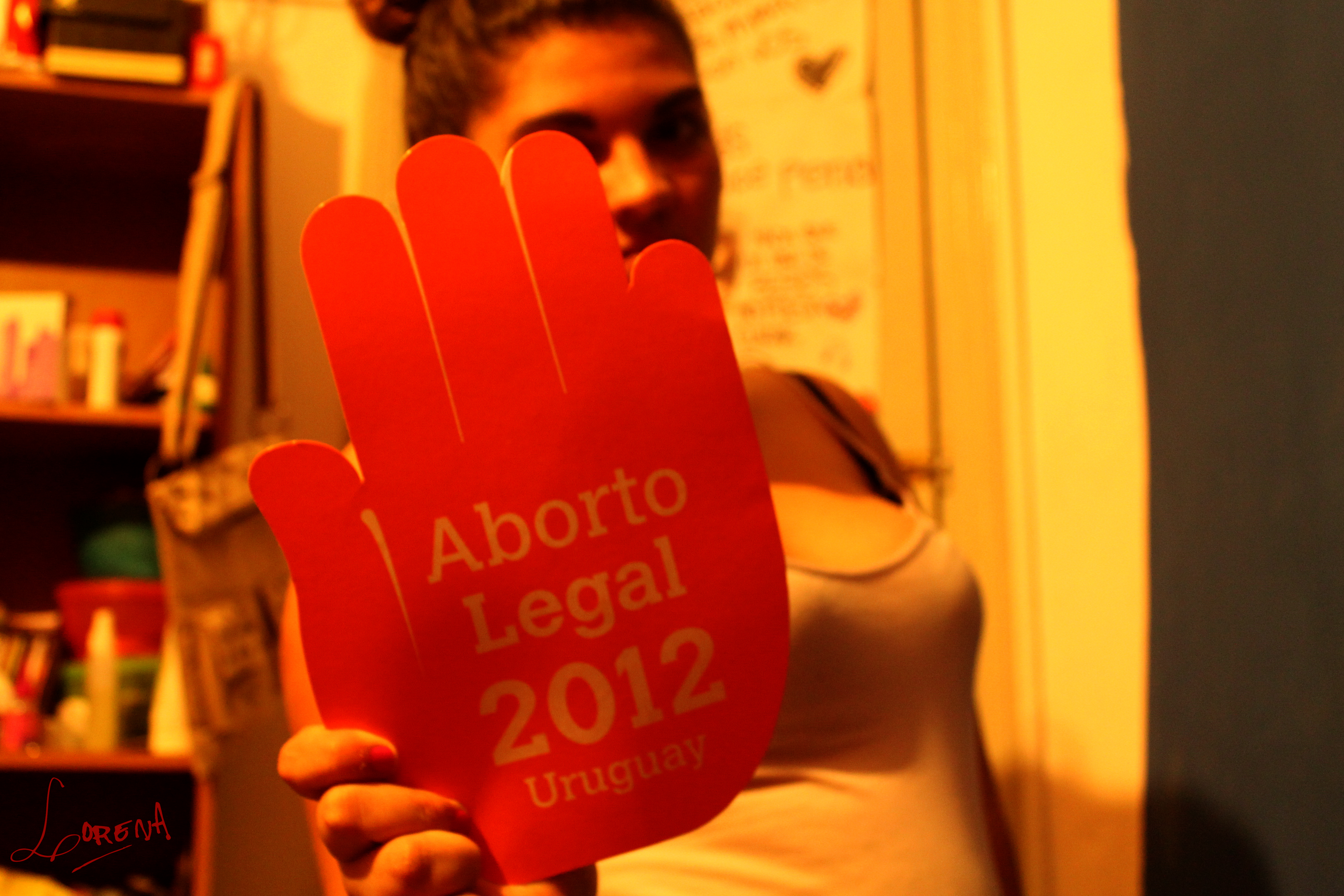
A picture of a pro-choice pamphlet distributed during a 2012 protest to legalize abortion in Uruguay

In 2012, Uruguay decriminalized abortion. While a number of politicians and advocacy groups protested its legalization, in 2013, they failed to muster the required support for a national referendum to settle the matter, and the political positions are varied, with leaders from all the parties that think differently. This debate is found throughout Latin America and is reflected in the countries' diverse policies on abortion and reproductive healthcare. The same "Pro-vida" movements and "Marea Verde" movements are found throughout the region as well.

== Post-Legalization ==
After the legalization of abortion in Uruguay, there has been a decrease in fertility rates. Adolescent fertility rates having the largest drop of 87 births per 1000 women to 48. This isn't solely driven by the legalization of abortion, but it is a contributing factor. Around the same time improved education, preferences for smaller families, and same-sex marriage legalization drove these around the early 2010s.

Accompanying this fertility change was a fear of judgement for those seeking abortion care from themselves, peers, and medical staff. 95% of those seeking abortions reported judging themself, 85% reported fearing being judged by peers, and 24% reported feeling judged by health care providers and others seeking abortion services. As well, 29% reported being worried they would be judged by their doctors after seeking an abortion.

Many people seeking abortions reported knowing that abortion was decriminalized. However, only 23% knew their doctor could object to their abortion. A majority interviewed found the mandatory five-day waiting period superfluous given they had already gone to hospital to have the abortion performed. While the five-day reflection period is a legal requirement, hospitals can still impose longer reflection periods to use their facilities. One person reported having to wait 15 days before they could receive their care.

== See also ==
- Abortion law
- Reproductive rights in Latin America
