= Abortion in Venezuela =

Abortion in Venezuela is currently illegal except in some specific cases outlined in the Venezuelan Constitution, and the country has one of Latin America's most restrictive abortion laws.

The punishment for a woman who has an abortion for any other reason is a prison sentence lasting anywhere between six months and two years. While the punishment for a doctor or any person who performs the procedure is between one and three years, harsher penalties may apply if the pregnant woman dies as a result of the procedure. There has been debate over this topic for several years.

The Latin American and the Caribbean region holds one of the highest rates of induced abortion in the world; it is calculated that for every 1,000 live births, there are just over 300 abortions, many of which are illegal and/or clandestine abortions. This mix of legal and illegal abortions is due to the region's diverse policies on abortion and access to reproductive healthcare. There is not a clear statistic for Venezuela-specific abortion rates, possibly due to a great majority of the abortions that occur going undocumented.

== Terminology ==
Any surgical or medicinal method of termination of a pregnancy can be classified as an induced abortion.

A clandestine abortion is one that is not performed under proper medical care or safe conditions. Since abortion is illegal in Venezuela, a clandestine procedure is often the only choice that a woman has in terminating an unwanted pregnancy, unless she is faced with certain conditions.

Venezuela's policy on abortion follows the "indications model", meaning that it is permissible only when the pregnancy is a threat to the health of the pregnant woman, it is a result of rape, or the fetus cannot live outside of the womb.

== Legislation ==
Venezuela approved a law in 1926 banning abortion that was left unmodified up to 2000, when a reform allowed the procedure if the woman's life was in danger. A clause of the Venezuelan Penal Code reduces the sentence "if the author of the abortion commits it to save his or his mother, wife or children's honour".

Article 340 of the Penal Code states that "a women who intentionally aborts, using means employed by herself or by a third party with their consent, shall be punished with prison for six months to two years. Article 433 offers an exception: "a person carrying out an abortion will not incur any penalty if it is an indispensable measure to save the life of the mother." Article 434 states that "the sentences established in the preceding articles shall be reduced in the proportion of one to two thirds and the imprisonment shall be converted into imprisonment, in the event that the perpetrator of the abortion has committed it to save his own honor or the honor of his wife, his mother, his descendant, his sister or his adopted daughter".

== History ==
The economic crisis in Venezuela has served as another influence on policy. Some groups are combating policies to fight for abortion rights.The crisis has also led to a decrease in access to contraceptives, and has caused many women to resort to sterilization and abortion as a family planning method.

Many anti-abortion non-governmental organizations in the country stopped offering support or disappeared after the detention in October 2020, Vannesa Rosales, an activist from Mérida state, after helping an underage rape victim to abort. Another four feminist organizations unrelated to reproductive rights stopped working after receiving threats.

== Access to contraceptives ==
Along with healthcare, particularly affected are Venezuelans' access to contraceptives. According to a 2019 estimate, around 90% of Venezuelans did not have access to birth control methods. Since contraceptives are not considered an "essential medicine", they are at an even greater shortage than non-contraceptive medications. The few contraceptives available are subject to high inflation rates. For instance, a three-pack of condoms can cost several weeks' worth of minimum wage pay, and a box of birth control pills can cost almost a year's worth of pay at the same rate, making them virtually unaffordable for citizens.

As of 2021, informal vendors often have offered birth control pills and misoprostol (a drug that can be used to induce labor and cause a medical abortion) in online platforms such as Facebook Marketplace and MercadoLibre, Latin America's most popular online marketplace, as well as advertised in social media sites like Instagram and Twitter.

=== Misoprostol ===
Misoprostol is a drug that can be used to induce labor and cause a medical abortion, which is any abortion done via drug. Due to abortion's legal status, Venezuelans often obtain misoprostol through the black market, which is expensive and puts the mother at risk.

Misoprostol, though it is among the safer forms of clandestine abortion, can be dangerous if not taken under medical supervision. It may cause hemorrhaging and other adverse effects such as infection. If left untreated, it could lead to death. It is estimated that around 6,000 women die every year in Latin America alone because of unsafe abortions.

== Sterilization and abortion ==
For most, the high prices of contraceptives force them to resort to abstinence or sterilization. Though the sterilization procedure is expensive, some would rather pay over caring for children they cannot afford. This is done in lieu of later clandestine abortions. The Intercept reports that some of the women who opt for sterilization are as young as 14 years old.

== Social activism ==
During Hugo Chávez's presidency, groups such as the Feminists in Free and Direct Action for Safe Abortions in Revolution were formed to advocate to end dangerous clandestine abortions. After Venezuela's National Constituent Assembly was formed in July 2017 and Argentina's Congress held a vote to legalise abortion, women's and LGBTI rights activists presented the Assembly with a series of proposals to legalise abortion and expand sexual and reproductive rights on 20 June 2018."

Other efforts to support the movement include the efforts of one group to use a telephone hotline to inform women on how to safely have an abortion. This hotline provides women with the ability to make an informed decision about proceeding with an abortion. It does not, however, change the legal status of abortion in Venezuela, nor does it provide women access to medical care.

== Catholic Church ==
The Catholic Church teaches that procured abortion is a mortal sin and ‘artificial' forms of birth control (such as condoms or birth control pills) are also sinful, and "that abortion is a result of widespread immorality and ignorance." Protests against abortion-restrictive laws have raised concern for the Catholic community; in May 2006, Pope Benedict XVI held a meeting with President Hugo Chávez and raised concerns he may loosen abortion laws in Venezuela.

== See also ==
- Abortion by country
- Abortion law
- Crisis in Venezuela
- Reproductive rights in Latin America
