= Abortion in Suriname =

Abortion in Suriname is illegal except in case of the threat to life or health of the woman. The punishment for a woman who has an abortion is up to three years in prison, and the punishment for a doctor or other person who performs the procedure is up to four years.

In 2007, Health Minister nl:Celsius Waterberg caused a stir when he criticized the legalization of euthanasia while advocating abortion in limited circumstances, namely in the case of rape or danger to the unborn child.

== See also ==
- Abortion by country
- Abortion law
- Reproductive rights in Latin America
