= Abortion in Panama =

Abortion in Panama is illegal except in instances that the pregnancy is life-threatening or the health of the woman is at risk, or if the pregnancy is the result of rape or incest.

== History ==
A penal code was set in place on September 22, 1982, which penalized illegal abortions. This code is still active today.

In 2005, a poll was conducted with a simple questionnaire. One of the questions asked, "Do you agree or disagree with abortion?" 89.4% of those that answered were against abortions. According to the CIA, based upon the population as a whole, 85% of Panamanians are against abortion. Approximately four-fifths of Panama's population practices Roman Catholicism, which has as its official stance that abortion is murder.

== Legality ==
In Panama, abortion is illegal with the exception of two circumstances: if the mother's life is endangered by the pregnancy, or if she is the victim of rape or incest.

== Penalties for abortion ==
The punishment for a woman who has an illegal abortion is one to three years in prison. The punishment for a doctor or other person who provides the procedure with the woman's consent is 3 to 6 years in prison. If the procedure is done without the woman's consent, the punishment is 5 to 10 years in prison. If the woman dies as a result of the abortion, the punishment for the abortion provider is 5 to 10 years in prison. If the woman's husband is found guilty of performing the abortion, the penalties are increased by one sixth.

== Access to abortion facilities ==
The only abortions allowed to be performed are done by doctors in government-run hospitals.

However, NGOs like Women on Waves offer abortions to women in Panama in international ocean waters, where they are no longer under the jurisdiction of the republic of Panama government.[9]

== Alternatives to abortion ==
=== Contraceptives ===
Condoms, tubal ligation, and some intrauterine devices (IUDs) are available at no cost to a woman. Other forms of contraception that require a fee, such as other IUDs and chemical drugs (like the Depo shot), are available, but the woman does not need to get a prescription to obtain them.

=== Family planning ===
In 1965, the Asociación Panameña para el Planeamiento de la Familia (APLAFA) was founded to help women control the size of their families. A private family planning group, APLAFA has gone to great lengths not just to reduce the rate of teen pregnancy, but also to aid pregnant women with pre- and post-natal care for their unwanted pregnancies. The Panamanian government has also played a constructive role in the family planning movement. It offers services which teach couples about natural birth control methods (such as the ovulation method, the symptothermal method, and the rhythm method), as well as modern methods, which many know as "the pill", shots, patches, sterilization, and others.

== See also ==
- Abortion by country
- Abortion law
- Reproductive rights in Latin America
