= Abortion in Saint Kitts and Nevis =

Abortion law in Saint Kitts and Nevis, a country in the West Indies and a member of the Commonwealth of Nations, is modelled on British legislation. Abortion is permitted in circumstances where a woman's life is threatened by pregnancy.

== Legislation ==
Abortion law in Saint Kitts and Nevis, as in numerous other Commonwealth member countries, is based on the British Offences against the Person Act 1861. Abortion is addressed in Part IX of Saint Kitts and Nevis's own Offences against the Person Act, in Sections 53 and 54, which state that any woman who unlawfully attempts to procure an abortion is guilty of felony and can be imprisoned for up to ten years with or without hard labour. A third party who administers an unlawful abortion is subject to the same penalty while the supplier of an instrument or substance with the knowledge that it will be used to cause an unlawful abortion is guilty of misdemeanour and faces a penalty of up to two years in prison.

The Infant Life (Preservation) Act, which was adapted from the British Infant Life (Preservation) Act 1929, permits abortion at any stage of pregnancy so long as the procedure is performed "in good faith for the purpose only of preserving the life of the mother". It states that a person who causes an abortion after 28 weeks of pregnancy is guilty of "child destruction", a felony, and is punishable with life imprisonment with or without hard labour. Saint Kitts and Nevis also follows precedents set in British abortion law, such as Rex v Bourne (1938), in which the court ruled that an abortion performed on a teenage rape victim was lawful as it prevented harm to the victim's physical and mental health.

== Access to abortion services ==
A three-year study of abortion practices in the northeast Caribbean, published in 2005, noted that women from Saint Kitts and Nevis who are seeking abortions often travel to nearby Caribbean countries in order to remain anonymous.

== See also ==
- Abortion in the United Kingdom
