= Abortion in Cuba =

Abortion in Cuba is legal and available upon request, which is rare in Latin America because of widespread Catholic influence.

== History ==
Abortion in Cuba used to be limited to cases of harm to the mother or fetus and to cases of pregnancy because of rape. While the nature of this law was highly restrictive, the law itself was not strictly enforced, which meant that abortion was still accessible even before its legalization.

However, as private abortions climbed in numbers, so did mortality rates among women seeking then-illegal abortions. It was the spike in mortality rates that sparked the 1965 liberalization of legal abortion, which was no longer restricted to extreme cases and was to be carried out by public doctors free of charge, rather than by private practitioners.

The pre-revolutionary fertility rate in Cuba was extremely low, compared to its Latin American peers, and dropped as low as 26 per 1,000 people in 1958. Post-revolutionary Cuba experienced a significant baby boom, which peaked in the mid-1960s. Following the increased fertility rate alongside the 1965 decriminalization of abortion, legal abortion rates in Cuba rose dramatically. By 1977, the Cuban population reached 420 legal abortions per 1,000 pregnancies, one of the highest legal abortion ratios in the world during the 1970s.

== Current legal status ==
In the hope of curbing high mortality rates among Cuban women attempting self-abortions, the Cuban government decriminalized abortion in 1965. The fight for legalization was furthered in 1979, when legislation was passed to make abortion more easily accessible by Cuban women. Since then, abortion in Cuba has remained easily accessible as well as free countrywide from Cuba's national public healthcare system.

Abortions after 10 weeks require a formal evaluation that is conducted by a committee of gynecologists and a psychologist.

== Methods ==
Throughout history, naturally occurring herbs and plants have been used to induce abortion and end unwanted pregnancies in Latin America. Other common practices of inducing illegal abortions include the insertion of objects such as sticks and catheters into the uterus in order to rupture the amniotic sac to trigger termination. However, such methods of abortion are highly unsafe and often result in serious complications for the woman.

Cuba's data shows a lack of correlation between the use of contraception and the abortion rate. Other Latin American countries, such as Chile, have observed decreased hospitalization rates related to unsafe abortion complications after the popularization of contraceptive use. Cuba, however, simultaneously sees high contraception use and high rates of abortion.

One possible explanation for this lack of correlation could be the high failure rates of contraceptives in Cuba, which rose as high as 20%, in 1987.

== Society and culture ==
Other contraceptives and methods of birth control are still very commonly used in Cuba, in addition to abortion, as means of fertility regulation. While abortion remains a highly popular method for fertility regulation in Cuba, the IUD and oral contraceptives are the most popular preventative measures against pregnancy for Cuban women.

In Cuba, low birth rates are commonly associated with the idea of modernity, and they have been made possible by the availability of safe abortion throughout the country.

== See also ==
- Reproductive rights in Latin America
- Abortion law
