= Women's Link Worldwide =

American nonprofit organization

Women's Link Worldwide is a non governmental organization that uses the power of law to promote social change that favors the rights of women and girls, especially those who face multiple inequalities. It was founded in 2001 by American lawyer Viviana Waisman.

== Foundation and way of working ==
Women's Link Worldwide was founded in 2001. Since then, it has implemented advocacy, promotion, and litigation activities to establish standards that advance the human rights of women and girls. It is recognized for its ability to develop legal theories and strategies, particularly regarding violations of women's human rights.

They work internationally, building alliances with activists around the world. They study the context, design strategies, draft legal briefs, and appear before the judiciary in national, regional, and international courts. They legally represent women, offer mentorship, training, and practical tools, and promote professional exchanges.

Furthermore, under the motto "Beyond the Courts," Women's Link Worldwide use their work in litigation and other legal proceedings not only to strengthen the human rights infrastructure, but also to foster public debate and contribute to social mobilization capable of transforming society and guaranteeing the rights of women and girls.

They have regional offices in Colombia and Spain, a strong presence in Latin America and Europe, and are building partnerships in East Africa.

In 2011, Women's Link Worldwide awarded Iranian judge Gholam-Hossein Mohseni-Eje'i the International Bludgeon Award. It described him as "the most misogynist judge in the world."

== Mission and vision ==
=== Mission ===
Women's Link Worldwide uses the power of law to promote social change that supports the rights of women and girls, especially those facing multiple inequalities.

=== Work topics ===
Women's Link Worldwide's work revolves around six areas of focus that they believe allow them to demonstrate how different aspects of women's rights intertwine. From these themes, they identify projects where strategic litigation can have an impact, where there is a possibility for lasting change, and where their expertise allows them not only to impact the issue at hand, but also to make a more comprehensive contribution to the women's and human rights movement.

The areas are: sexual and reproductive rights, obstacles to accessing abortion in Spain, human trafficking, women and borders, women and peacebuilding, discrimination, and violence.

== Lines of work ==
Women's Link Worldwide believes that social change through the courts is achievable and sustainable as long as the recognition of human rights transcends the judicial sphere and involves civil society organizations, other government bodies, and society as a whole.

The group promotes and protects the human rights of women and girls by creating jurisprudence, building capacity, and creating conditions.

== See also ==
- Feminism
- Gender equality
- Gender perspective
- Gender studies
- Women's Studies
- Reproductive rights
- Women on Waves
- International law
- Universal Declaration of Human Rights 1948
- International human rights law
- International Covenants on Human Rights
- Second Optional Protocol to the International Covenant on Civil and Political Rights
- Optional Protocol to the Convention on the Elimination of All Forms of Discrimination against Women

== Literature ==
- Roa, Monica; Klugman, Barbara (2019). Social Change and the Courts: Options in the Activists' Advocacy Toolkit ( PDF ). "…Meet the Ice" (1st edition). Cali, Colombia: Icesi University ISBN 978-958-8936-82-6. doi:10.18046/EUI/aceh.10.2019.
