= Abortion in Guyana =

Abortion in Guyana is legal during the first eight weeks of pregnancy, but it is illegal after eight weeks except in cases of endangering the maternal or fetal health. Throughout much of the 20th century, it was officially illegal but rarely were laws against abortion ever enforced. In 1995, legislation was passed which made abortion legal as long as it was done within the first 8 weeks of pregnancy and done with the consent of the pregnant woman and by a licensed medical practitioner.

Between 8 and 12 weeks from conception, abortion is only legal if the pending childbirth would result in health risks for the woman or the fetus alternatively if the pregnancy occurred despite the use of contraceptives. Between 12 and 16 weeks, an abortion can still be legally performed, but only if the health of the woman or fetus is in danger. After 16 weeks, it is only possible to perform an abortion in the case of severe health-related circumstances.

== Legislation ==
During the final years of the PNC's rule under Forbes Burnham, the PNC drafted a bill similar to a Medical Termination of Pregnancy Bill passed in Barbados in 1983. The bill was shelved as being too contentious at the time before the 1990 election, and from a "noisy, public rally" held by a minority of fundamentalist Christians.

The Pro-Reform Group (PRG) approached legalizing abortion with the context of benefitting public health rather than as a moral battleground: old anti-abortion laws were shown to do little in the way of actually reducing the number of attempted abortions, and in 1991, septic abortion was the third leading cause of admission to hospitals; burdening an already weak healthcare system. Amid a growing global interest in women's issues, it was praised internationally, however local engagement of the issue was slim. The issue gained individual support, but very little in the way of other organization representation.

In 1995, Guyana passed what was then considered some of the most liberal abortion laws in South America with the Medical Termination of Pregnancy Act. It was championed by Gail Teixeira, and signed by President Cheddi Jagan. However, when women seeking lawful abortions went to Georgetown Public Hospital days after the bill was passed, they were turned away. Despite a successful public campaign and legal reform, access to abortion was not provided at either of the country's largest hospitals (Georgetown Public Hospital as well as New Amsterdam Public Hospital).

Hospitals were not actively rejecting abortion, but unclear regulation and uncertainty regarding administering abortions turned hesitation into a denial of service. Nor were any health institutions providing statistical information about services undertaken related to failed attempts of abortion. An important exception was the work of Dr. M.Y. Bacchus, a gynecologist who advised other doctors on quality of care that coincided with a 41% drop in hospital admissions related to incomplete abortions. An advisory board for track the results of the bill was formed in 1996, but opponents discouraged religious leaders from joining, damaging the public credibility of such a group. An untimely death of the first chairman let to a replacement by a member of the International Planned Parenthood Federation, but extensive travel made leadership in the role challenging.

In 2006, the Guyanese government theoretically cleared the way for public hospitals to "perform abortions". In actuality, the public hospitals only complete abortions which have already been partially undertaken by pregnant women. They began doing so in 2008.

The Guyanese government continues to look for ways to lower the number of abortions in Guyana.

== Non-government efforts ==
Comprehensive services for family planning are done by NGOs. The Family Planning Association of Guyana provides services for poor women, but they are completely dependent on foreign aid. Since wealthier women have more access to family planning services, poorer women are proportionately disadvantaged in terms of education and economic support.

Red Thread is another group that actively campaigns and educates for women's rights.

== Reporting ==
Even though reporting is required by law, an estimate in 2012 is that less than a quarter of all terminations are being reported.

There has been a concern of Guyana becoming a destination for "abortion tourism" but documented cases show this is not the case. Reports in the late 90s also show that demographically, abortion is represented proportionally across all races and religions. In 2010, a survey showed that 99.7% abortions were performed in private clinics, while treatment of complications was 70% done in public hospitals.

== Methods ==
Cyotec has been accessible in Guyana since the late 90s from pharmacists, and RU486 since around 2010. D&C is the most common procedure in hospitals.

== Men's issues ==
Vasectomies are rarely promoted in the Caribbean.

== See also ==
- Women in Guyana
- Health in Guyana
- Abortion law
- Reproductive rights in Latin America
