= Lima Consensus (conference) =

The Lima Consensus consists of the regional contributions adopted during the eighth Regional Conference on Women in Latin America and the Caribbean, during the special session of the General Assembly entitled 'Women 2000: Gender Equality, Development and Peace for the Twenty-first Century'. The Conference was held in Lima, Peru, from 8 to 10 February 2000.
