= Green Wave (abortion rights) =

Advocacy movement in Latin America

The Green Wave or Green Tide (Spanish: "Marea verde") is a set of decentralized abortion-rights movements in various countries in the Americas that have collectively adopted the colour green as a symbol of their movement and has had mixed successes in pushing for abortion rights in Latin America, a region known for some of the strictest anti-abortion laws in the world. Its supporters typically wear a green handkerchief around their necks, leading to their members being called "pañuelos verdes." While Latin America is a diverse region with a large range of abortion policies, the Green Wave has made its way across the area and has had an impact on abortion policies. In recent years, a reaction against the movement led to the formation of the conservative "pañuelos celestes" which have successfully lobbied to maintain current restrictions in Chile, alongside potential reversals in legislation in Argentina after the election of Javier Milei.

The Catholic and Evangelical churches have historically had immense power in Latin America, and have consistently dictated the landscape on the debate of abortion.

== History ==
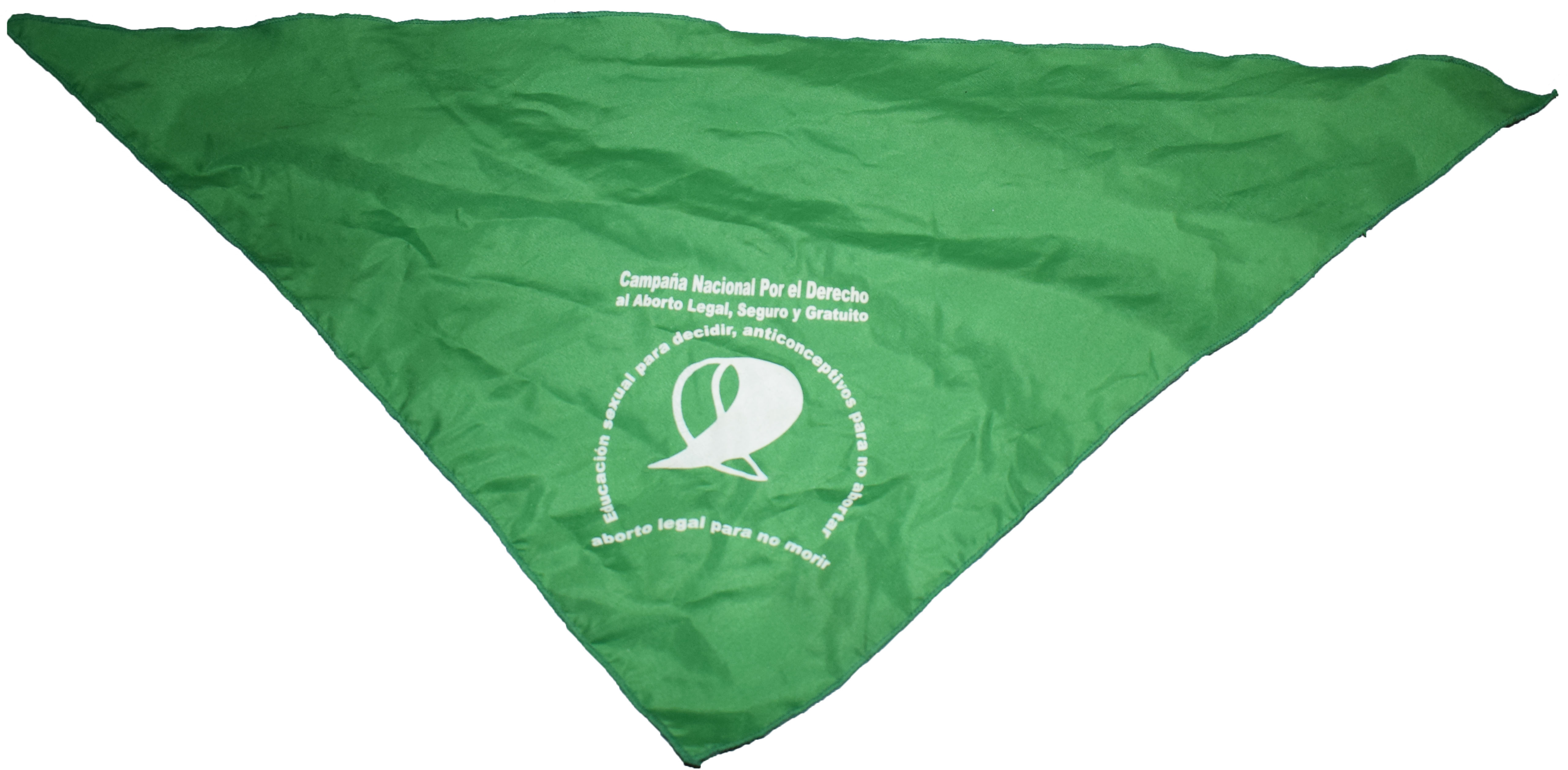
Green bandana (Argentina, 2021)

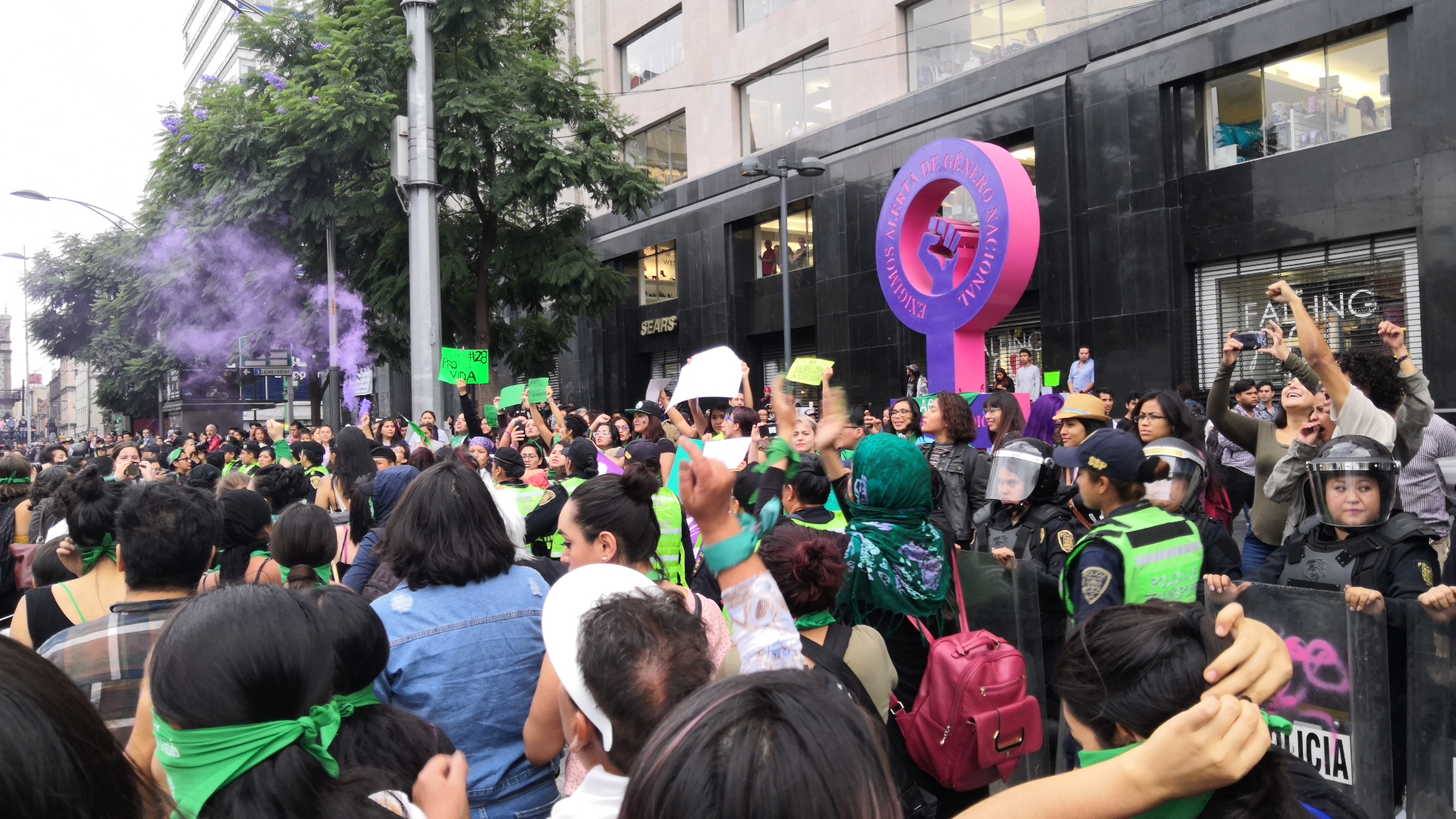
Green bandanas and signs at a march to legalize abortion (Mexico City, 2019)

Green bandanas were first adopted as a symbol by Argentinian abortion and family planning rights activists in 2003, drawing inspiration from the Mothers of the Plaza de Mayo protesters who similarly used white scarves (opponents of abortion rights in Argentina in turn began using blue bandanas as their symbol). Green bandanas were also used by Argentinian Ni una menos anti-femicide protesters in 2015. By 2020, green bandanas were being used by abortion rights proponents in several other Latin American countries. The color green was used as a representation of hope and life. During the 2020s, multiple Latin American countries began to decriminalize abortion. After the Supreme Court of the United States overturned a precedent that mandated abortion access federally and multiple U.S. states began restricting abortion access as a result, abortion rights protesters in the United States also began using green as their symbol.

Green Wave activists have aided in the creation of pro-choice legislation. Notably, Argentina, Colombia and Mexico have experienced tremendous shifts. The Green Wave began in Argentina, but has spread to other Latin American nations.

== Argentina ==
Argentina's legalization of abortion in 2020 was the first success attributed to the Green Wave movement.The Green Wave movement gained visibility thank to a very controversial case that encourage other women to march and fight for women's reproductive rights. A girl named Belén was accused of performing self-induced abortion and sent to prison. It was such an emblematic case that her story became a book What happened to Belén and became a symbol of resiliance and justice for many women in Argentina. Belén's case also sparked the Ni una menos movement, "not one (woman) less". Her lawyer, Soledad Deza, rallied Amnesty International to ignite the movement, Ni una menos, symbolized by donning white masks, the same white mask Belén wore leaving prison. Ni una menos then set off the Green Wave movement. Belén's case became an uproar to gain greater protections for all women. On January 14, 2021, Argentine President Alberto Fernández signed Argentina's 27.610 law into effect after Senate Approval in December 2020. This law permits abortions within 14 weeks of pregnancy, with options after 14 weeks if the pregnant person's life or mental-physical wellbeing are in danger. Also, the law permits abortion in cases of rape. Many conservatives have tried lobbying Argentine president, Javier Milei, into recriminalizing abortion. The president is known to be fervently pro-life.

== Colombia ==
On February 21, 2022, Colombia's Constitutional Court legalized abortions within 24 weeks of pregnancy. After 24 weeks, premature babies would have a better chance of surviving outside of the womb. To encourage Colombia to adopt abortion legislation, a campaign emerged in order to bring familiar faces into the discussion. It was titled "Hijas de La Frontera", and was produced with Colombian TV and Movie Stars like Katherine Porto. It shed light on real Colombian stories of abortions, and referenced the importance of abortions, as well as the power of decriminalization.

Shortly after the passing of this legislation, Colombia's Justice Ministry, with the support of President Duque, petitioned the Constitutional Court to annul its decision, but were unsuccessful.

== Mexico ==
At the state level, Mexico City was the first within the state to legalize abortion in 2007. Mexico City is an extremely progressive region, as Same-Sex Marriage in Mexico city was legalized in 2009 and upheld by the Supreme Court in 2010.

A map depicting the abortion legalities in Mexico by state.

After the legalization of abortion in the state, it took nearly 12 years for the second Mexican state Oaxaca, to decriminalize it. Abortion in Mexico has slowly been decriminalized at the state level, with 23 states allowing the procedure as of June 2025. Many states decriminalized abortion through changes in their local legislation, but to states, Aguascalientes and Coahuila were changed through a Supreme Court ruling from the challenging of civil society organizations, inspired by movements of the Green Wave.

Sixteen years after Mexico City's decriminalization, the Mexican federal government followed. On September 6, 2023, Mexico's Supreme Court ruled that abortion must be removed from Mexico's Federal Penal Code. All federal health care facilities must offer abortion services to those who desire it.

== See also ==
- Green scarf
- Reproductive rights in Latin America
