= Zika virus outbreak =

Zika virus outbreak may refer to:

- 2015–2016 Zika virus epidemic
- Zika virus outbreak timeline
- 2013–2014 Zika virus outbreaks in Oceania
- 2007 Yap Islands Zika virus outbreak
