= List of countries by abortion rate =

The following lists include countries by total reported abortions, annual abortions and rates according to reports from governments and statisticians.

The CDC or Guttmacher estimates do not account for medical abortions outside a clinic. Some analysts have estimated that the cumulative number of abortions in the United States may have reached a hundred million and that up to two million abortions occur annually. The Soviet Union had more than 200 million reported abortions throughout its history according to the Johnstons Archive. Since legalization in 1967, there have been 9,331,978 abortions in the United Kingdom according to government reports collected by the Johnstons Archive.

The Guttmacher study numbers used in the table below are estimates based on statistical models and are not actual reported numbers.

== International Abortion Rate Report ==
Country	Rate per 1,000 women per year	Number of abortions per year	Year	Age range
Greenland	84.7	870	2022	17–64
Pakistan	66.0	3,800,000	2023	15–49
Vietnam	64.0	1,630,000	2019	15–49
Madagascar	60.0	376,000	2019	15–49
Guinea-Bissau	59.0	26,600	2019	15–49
Cuba	55.0	147,000	2019	15–49
Cape Verde	49.0	7,100	2019	15–49
India	48.0	16,600,000	2019	15–49
Trinidad and Tobago	48.0	17,100	2019	15–49
Cambodia	45.0	195,000	2019	15–49
Sierra Leone	45.0	82,600	2019	15–49
Barbados	45.0	3,000	2019	15–49
Congo	44.0	54,700	2019	15–49
Pakistan	43.0	2,240,000	2019	15–49
Kenya	43.0	551,000	2019	15–49
Uganda	43.0	418,000	2019	15–49
Samoa	43.0	1,800	2019	15–49
Peru	42.0	353,000	2019	15–49
Liberia	42.0	47,600	2019	15–49
Maldives	42.0	4,700	2019	15–49
Nepal	41.0	348,000	2019	15–49
Gabon	41.0	21,100	2019	15–49
Mozambique	40.0	277,000	2019	15–49
Vanuatu	39.0	2,800	2019	15–49
São Tomé and Príncipe	39.0	1,900	2019	15–49
Tanzania	38.0	482,000	2019	15–49
Haiti	38.0	111,000	2019	15–49
Bolivia	38.0	108,000	2019	15–49
Jamaica	38.0	29,800	2019	15–49
Ghana	37.0	266,000	2019	15–49
Dominican Republic	37.0	101,000	2019	15–49
Saint Lucia	37.0	1,900	2019	15–49
Philippines	36.0	973,000	2019	15–49
Papua New Guinea	36.0	77,200	2019	15–49
Guyana	36.0	7,300	2019	15–49
Bangladesh	35.0	1,580,000	2019	15–49
Ivory Coast	35.0	207,000	2019	15–49
Zambia	35.0	140,000	2019	15–49
Cameroon	34.0	201,000	2019	15–49
Laos	34.0	64,100	2019	15–49
Paraguay	34.0	60,900	2019	15–49
Timor-Leste	34.0	10,100	2019	15–49
Nigeria	33.0	2,000,000	2020	
DR Congo	33.0	593,000	2019	15–49
Argentina	33.0	368,000	2019	15–49
Angola	33.0	229,000	2019	15–49
Brazil	32.0	500,000	2021	15–49
Benin	32.0	84,300	2019	15–49
Togo	32.0	60,300	2019	15–49
Bhutan	32.0	6,400	2019	15–49
Solomon Islands	32.0	4,900	2019	15–49
Belize	32.0	3,300	2019	15–49
Mexico	31.0	1,040,000	2019	15–49
Malawi	31.0	134,000	2019	15–49
Kyrgyzstan	31.0	49,500	2019	15–49
Puerto Rico	31.0	23,100	2019	15–49
Botswana	31.0	18,600	2019	15–49
Comoros	31.0	6,100	2019	15–49
Suriname	31.0	4,500	2019	15–49
South Africa	30.0	461,000	2019	15–49
Burkina Faso	30.0	136,000	2019	15–49
Panama	30.0	31,200	2019	15–49
Somalia	29.0	93,200	2019	15–49
Namibia	29.0	18,600	2019	15–49
Eswatini	29.0	8,800	2019	15–49
French Guiana	29.0	2,100	2019	15–49
China	28.0	9,700,000	2021	
Sri Lanka	28.0	149,000	2019	15–49
Ecuador	28.0	123,000	2019	15–49
Rwanda	28.0	84,300	2019	15–49
Colombia	27.0	360,000	2019	15–49
Central African Republic	27.0	28,500	2019	15–49
Myanmar	26.0	387,000	2019	15–49
Guinea	26.0	77,400	2019	15–49
Burundi	26.0	65,000	2019	15–49
Tajikistan	26.0	58,100	2019	15–49
Indonesia	25.0	1,770,000	2019	15–49
Thailand	25.0	437,000	2019	15–49
South Sudan	25.0	63,600	2019	15–49
Tonga	25.0	620	2019	15–49
Ethiopia	24.0	632,000	2019	15–49
El Salvador	24.0	43,300	2019	15–49
Uzbekistan	23.0	198,000	2019	15–49
Mali	23.0	92,600	2019	15–49
Lesotho	23.0	12,800	2019	15–49
Egypt	23.0	1,050,000	2015	15–44
United Kingdom	23.0	277,970	2023	15–44
South Korea	21.0	50,000	2019	15–44
Honduras	21.0	53,000	2019	15–49
Costa Rica	21.0	27,500	2019	15–49
Mongolia	21.0	17,400	2019	15–49
Eritrea	21.0	16,500	2019	15–49
Djibouti	21.0	5,100	2019	15–49
Kazakhstan	20.1	71,442	2022	
Guatemala	19.0	85,400	2019	15–49
Turkmenistan	19.0	28,900	2019	15–49
Zimbabwe	18.0	67,300	2019	15–49
Moldova	18.0	19,400	2019	15–49
Sweden	18.0	35,550	2023	15–44
France	17.3	251,270	2024	15–49
Taiwan	17.0	93,211	2007	15–44
Chad	17.0	58,400	2019	15–49
Mauritania	17.0	17,800	2019	15–49
United States	16.7	1,126,000	2025	15–44
New Zealand	16.6	17,785	2024	15–44
Australia	16.0	93,800	2019	15–49
Gambia	16.0	8,800	2019	15–49
Niger	15.0	69,000	2019	15–49
Senegal	15.0	57,900	2019	15–49
Greece	15.0	34,600	2019	15–49
Nicaragua	14.0	26,800	2019	15–49
North Macedonia	14.0	7,300	2019	15–49
Russia	13.1	553,500	2020	
Iceland	13.0	990	2019	15–49
Armenia	12.8	10,718	2020	
Canada	12.0	97,500	2019	15–49
Denmark	12.0	14,600	2019	15–49
Bulgaria	11.9	19,328	2020	
Azerbaijan	11.8	34,712	2020	
Belarus	11.4	16,696	2022	
Norway	11.0	13,100	2019	15–49
Uruguay	11.0	9,500	2019	15–49
Bosnia and Herzegovina	11.0	8,500	2019	15–49
Iran	10.7	450,000	2021	
Estonia	10.3	3,741	2019	
Poland	10.0	93,000	2019	15–49
Hungary	9.8	23,901	2020	
Israel	8.4	17,582	2019	15–49
Belgium	8.0	19,500	2019	15–49
Finland	7.6	9,100	2025	
Spain	7.5	88,269	2020	
Chile	7.0	33,000	2019	
Netherlands	7.0	26,500	2019	15–49
Romania	6.7	31,889	2020	
Czech Republic	6.4	16,886	2020	
Latvia	6.4	2,848	2020	
Germany	6.2	105,710	2025	
Slovenia	6.1	2,945	2020	
Ukraine	6.0	64,893	2020	
Montenegro	6.0	860	2019	15–49
Portugal	5.6	14,075	2020	
Luxembourg	5.2	559	2022	
Japan	5.1	122,725	2022	15–49
Switzerland	5.1	10,775	2020	
Singapore	5.0	7,400	2019	15–49
Italy	4.9	65,757	2020	
Serbia	4.8	8,005	2020	
Slovakia	4.4	6,180	2020	
Lithuania	4.3	2,794	2020	
Turkey	2.7	43,000	2021	
Croatia	2.7	2,594	2020	
Austria	1.3	1,800	2021	
Albania	1.2	873	2020	
Algeria	0.4	8,000	2018	

== Aggregate data ==
Country	Total Reported
China	336,000,000+
India	100,000,000+
United States	62,000,000+

== See also ==
- Abortion in the United States by state
