= Abortion in Puerto Rico =

Abortion in Puerto Rico is technically prohibited on request, although it is de facto allowed without a clear limit. On June 22, 2022, the Senate passed a bill limiting abortion to 22 weeks, with exceptions for danger to the mother's life, fetal defects, and if the fetus would not be viable. The bill will need to be considered by the House.

Attitudes and laws in Puerto Rico relating to abortion have been significantly impacted by decisions of the federal government of the United States, as well as the Puerto Rican Catholic Church. Abortion effectively became legal in 1937 after a series of changes in the law by the Puerto Rico legislature based on introduction of Malthusian clinics introduced from US-initiated eugenic policies. During the 1960s and early 1970s, women from the mainland of the United States would travel to the island for legal abortions, with the practice largely ending in 1973 as a result of the US Supreme Court's decision in Roe v. Wade. Women have continued to travel to Puerto Rico from other parts of the Caribbean since the 1990s to obtain abortions illegal in their home countries. The total number of abortion clinics on the island has been in decline since a peak of over a dozen in the 1990s.

Abortion statistics provided by the government have been criticized as unreliable. There were 19,200 abortions in 1991–1992, and 15,600 in 2001. There is an abortion rights community on the island, which is supported by a number of organizations. In 2019, International Women's Day in Puerto Rico revolved around women taking to the streets en masse to support abortion rights. There is also an anti-abortion movement in Puerto Rico.

== Public health background ==
Hurricane Maria made landfall in Puerto Rico on September 20, 2017, and had a major impact on the overall public health situation on the island that was still being felt years later. Healthcare infrastructure was severely damaged, including hospitals, dialysis centers and HIV support centers. Zika risks were also increased because of an increase in the number of mosquitoes. There was also an increase in demand but a decrease in supply of mental health services.

== History ==
Puerto Rico became a United States territory in 1898. American colonial powers in Puerto Rico had a major impact on the island's relationship with women's reproductive rights and on abortion laws. In 1937, modeled after US-initiated eugenic policies, Puerto Rico adopted more liberal abortion policies which saw the introduction of Malthusian clinics. Prior to this, abortion in Puerto Rico had been all but illegal. The changes meant medical doctors effectively became the arbitrators of when it was legal for women to be given an abortion. There was no move by the legislature of Puerto Rico to create new abortion legislation prior to the 1973 Roe v. Wade US Supreme Court ruling. Prior to the Roe v. Wade ruling, it was often a bit cheaper and easier for women to obtain abortions in Puerto Rico than it was for women to obtain abortions in the mainland United States. After the ruling of Roe v. Wade making abortion more legal and accepted by Puerto Ricans, the number of negative health incidents resulting from abortions went down significantly, prompting abortion views to be relooked at and even changed by government officials in the interest of better public health. White women were one of the largest groups of women to travel to the island to get an abortion. The Society for Humane Abortions (SHA) assisted in facilitating women from the mainland traveling to Puerto Rico and other locations like Japan and Mexico for abortions during the 1960s and early 1970s. Research on abortion on the island only began in 1983. Puerto Rico has the second highest fertility rate in Latin America, behind only Mexico, and in 1991 had an above average abortion rate of 22%—although the abortion related data from Puerto Rico is not regarded as highly reliable.

Pregnant women in Puerto Rico in 2016 were at risk of getting the Zika virus, which causes major fetal defects. These defects may lead some women choose to terminate their pregnancy. In 2018 and 2019, the effects of Hurricane Maria hampered women's ability on the island to get access to abortion services.

=== Legislative history ===
Abortion effectively became legal in Puerto Rico in 1937 after the territory's legislature repealed existing laws around reproductive care and treatment. These reforms included allowing interstate transportation of information about contraceptives and birth control methods, legalized contraceptive sterilization, and introduced a therapeutic exemption for abortions to protect the life or health of the woman who was pregnant.

In 1964, there was a legislative effort to try to repeal the 1937 reforms by amending Puerto Rico's penal code, though it was only partially effective in totally criminalizing abortion; one consequence of these efforts though was it resulted in a large drop in the number of abortions performed in Puerto Rico. There was no move by the legislature of Puerto Rico to make abortion legal prior to the 1973 Roe v. Wade US Supreme Court ruling, which Puerto Ricans themselves had little to no political say in, as they do not have United States national voting rights.

In 2012, the Puerto Rico Penal Code was revised in Section II, Articles 99 to 101 that relate to abortion. Changes were made that made having an abortion a felony. This legislation was largely pushed through by the New Progressive Party who were trying to win votes among conservative voters on the island, even if the legislation could not withstand judicial review.

As of 2016, the law required that women seeking an abortion must have a pelvic exam performed by the doctor providing the abortion at the clinic. The law also required women have their blood testing for anemia and to determine their RH factor. The law also required doctors to offer any other exams or tests that may be needed prior to performing the abortion so a woman is fully informed, including a sonogram to determine how far along the pregnancy is. Prior to 2019, minors did not require consent before getting an abortion so long as the doctor had provided the minor woman with adequate information to allow her to make an informed decision.

An evangelical minister Senator named Nayda Venegas put forth a proposed law on March 4, 2019, that would require women under the age of 21 to get parental consent before being allowed to have an abortion. This effort failed. On May 7, 2018, Puerto Rico legislature proposed a series of abortion restrictions that were signed into law by the territory's governor on March 7, 2019. The restrictions included girls under the age of 18 being required to get parental consent before being allowed to get an abortion. An exception was allowed saying, "the minor can go to court if she insists on having an abortion to present their claims to getting an abortion." PS950 was vetoed on the same day, March 7, 2019, by Governor Ricardo Rosselló, who said the legislation imposed "onerous restrictions" on a woman's ability to access abortion services. The House then overrode the veto of PS950. Prenatal care for women under the age of 18 does not require similar parental consent.

In 2025, Governor Jenniffer Gonzalez Colon signed legislation that amended the Civil Code of Puerto Rico to recognize personhood from the moment of conception. In 2026, Colon also signed a law that recognizes a fetus as a human being.

=== Judicial history ===
The US Supreme Court's decision in 1973's Roe v. Wade ruling meant the state could no longer regulate abortion in the first trimester. Abortion also became legal in Puerto Rico as a consequence of this decision. (However, the Supreme Court overturned Roe v. Wade in Dobbs v. Jackson Women's Health Organization, No. 19-1392, 597 U.S. ___ (2022) later, in 2022.) The Puerto Rican Supreme Court oversaw the case of the People of Puerto Rico v. Pablo Duarte Mendoza in 1980. Their ruling was effectively a territory specific answer to a question already answered by the US Supreme Court in the earlier Roe v. Wade. The 1980 case involved Dr. Pablo Duarte Mendoza being charged in 1973 for allegedly performing an illegal abortion on a 16-year-old girl in violation of Puerto Rico's 1937 abortion laws. Duarte was given a sentence of two to four years around the time that the 1937 law was being repealed and replaced with a law that provided women with greater access to abortion services. Duarte appealed the sentence to the Puerto Rico Supreme Court, which overturned the sentence given by the Puerto Rico Superior Court, citing the needs of the doctor to be able to consider a woman's health issues in the first trimester, with the women's health being a primary factor in whether or not an abortion should occur. The Supreme Court said that the issues of the health of the pregnant woman trumped any concern about her age.

=== Clinic history ===
During the 1930s when abortion was illegal, Puerto Rican midwives and nurses who had training related to prenatal care and delivering babies would also sometimes perform abortions; Puerto Rican women were willing to pay a premium to use these medical practitioners to have safer abortions. The passage of the 1937 revisions in law did not result in an immediate increase in the number of abortion providers as the new laws were not widely shared.

In the early 1990s, there were over a dozen abortion clinics in Puerto Rico. In 1993, there were thirteen private clinics on the island offering abortion services. Women in the 1990s in the Caribbean had few options for where they could get legal abortions, with Puerto Rico and Cuba being two of the places offering women the easiest legal access. This continued into the 2000s and 2010s. Women coming to Puerto Rico in 2016 for abortions included women from the Dominican Republic. In 2016, there were seven abortion clinics in the territory. The type of informed consent materials and documentation that minors were given in 2016 varied from clinic to clinic. This was because the law did not, by law, require informed consent for minors. In 2016, the price of an abortion at a family planning clinic generally cost around $225 to $325 for a first trimester abortion. In 2019, there were only six abortion clinics left on the island.

== Statistics ==
Reliable statistics about the number of legal abortions in Puerto Rico are difficult to ascertain because the Department of Health has historically failed to use reliable methodologies to attain numbers. 23 out of every 1,000 pregnancies in 1999 were terminated as a result of an abortion. In the period between 1991 and 1992, there were an estimated 19,200 legal abortions in the territory, with a rate of 22.7 and a ratio of 23.0 for a total abortion rate of 0.68. These rates were among some of the lowest in the world.

In 2016, 98% of abortions were performed in the first trimester, in the period between 7 and 13 weeks of pregnancy. Most of these abortions used one of two procedures, suction or the aspiration method. Only 2% of abortions in 2016 occurred in the second trimester, defined as week 13 to week 22. All abortions second trimester abortions took place before week 20. The most commonly used method in Puerto Rico for second trimester abortions is dilation and extraction.

Number, rate, and ratio of reported abortions, by reporting area of residence and occurrence and by percentage of abortions obtained by out-of-state residents
Location	Residence			Occurrence			% obtained by out-of-state residents	Year	Ref
Location	No.	Rate	Ratio	No.	Rate	Ratio	% obtained by out-of-state residents	Year	Ref
Puerto Rico					22			1991	
Puerto Rico				19,200	22.7	23.0		1991–1992	
Puerto Rico				15,600	18			2001	
Puerto Rico				3,622 (Note: This number is from the Department of Health, which uses a methodology that has been described as health academics as questionable.)				2009–2010	

== Public funding ==
Federal funding through Medicare is available to women in Puerto Rico in cases of rape, incest or risk of health or life to the mother. For women seeking abortions as a result of rape, the Department of Health's Rape Victims' Assistance Center (CAVV) provides assistance in seeking public funds.

== Abortion rights views and activities ==
=== Organizations ===
Clergy Consultation Service was an organization the promoted abortion rights on the island during the 1950s and 1960s. They were an outside organization.

Taller Salud is one of the organizations supporting abortion rights. Amnesty International Puerto Rico also works on abortion rights in Puerto Rico.

=== Views ===
Taller Salud's Michel Collado said in 2019, "Over the last few years, we've been struggling with a government that has eliminated access to sex education and gender perspective in public schools; they also cut funding to the NGOs [non-government organizations] that work with those issues."

=== Protests ===
In 2019, International Women's Day in Puerto Rico revolved around women taking to the streets en masse to support abortion. Their efforts this day on abortion rights were part of broader 8M efforts to combat gender violence.

== Anti-abortion views and activities ==
Anti-abortion activities in Puerto Rico tend to be more subdued than anti-abortion activities in the mainland United States, and are much less likely to include violence. Due to its vastly devout Catholic population, abortion in Puerto Rico has a significant religion-based opposition from members of the clergy. Despite the fact that abortion was legalized in 1973 in Puerto Rico, in a survey done in 1993 a majority of Puerto Rican's still believed it to be illegal due to the Catholic Clergy's own opposition to it. After the ruling of Roe v. Wade in the United States fully legalizing abortion in Puerto Rico, the Puerto Rican Catholic Church openly came out in disapproval of the verdict stating that forcing Puerto Rico to adopt pro-choice legislature is an example of an abusive colonial power dynamic. All three political parties in Puerto Rico intently stand against abortion despite the fact that it is officially legal and intentionally make it challenging for women seeking abortions to find proper care. They create euphemisms for the term itself and hide the fact that is available which has created widespread misunderstanding for Puerto Rican residents.

=== Views ===
Senator Venegas Brown said during the debate around PS950, "I wish this was a bill to ban abortion." Brown said the only reason Senators were not able to do so was because of Roe v. Wade.

The Puerto Rico Bar Association's committee focusing on decolonization efforts stated that a broad legalization of abortion in Puerto Rico as a result of Roe v. Wade is a situation that "dramatises the tragedy of the Puerto Rican nation, subjugated to the rulings of a foreign court that are repugnant to its conscience and culture." Arguing that Puerto Rico should be able to create legislature for itself, the Puerto Rico Bar Association took the stance of many Puerto Rican elected government officials who are in favor of a ban on abortion.

=== Protests ===
An anti-abortion rally was held in 1974 in San Juan following revisions in Puerto Rican law earlier that year.

== See also ==
Reproductive rights in Latin America
