= Societal attitudes towards abortion =

Societal attitudes towards abortion have varied throughout different historical periods and cultures. One manner of assessing such attitudes in the modern era has been to conduct opinion polls to measure levels of public opinion on abortion.

== Attitudes by region ==
=== Africa ===
- South Africa: A 2003 Human Sciences Research Council study examined moral attitudes among South Africans: 56% said they believed that abortion is wrong even if there is a strong chance of serious defect in the fetus, while 70% said they believed that abortion is wrong if done primarily because the parents have low income and may be unable to afford another child.

=== Europe ===
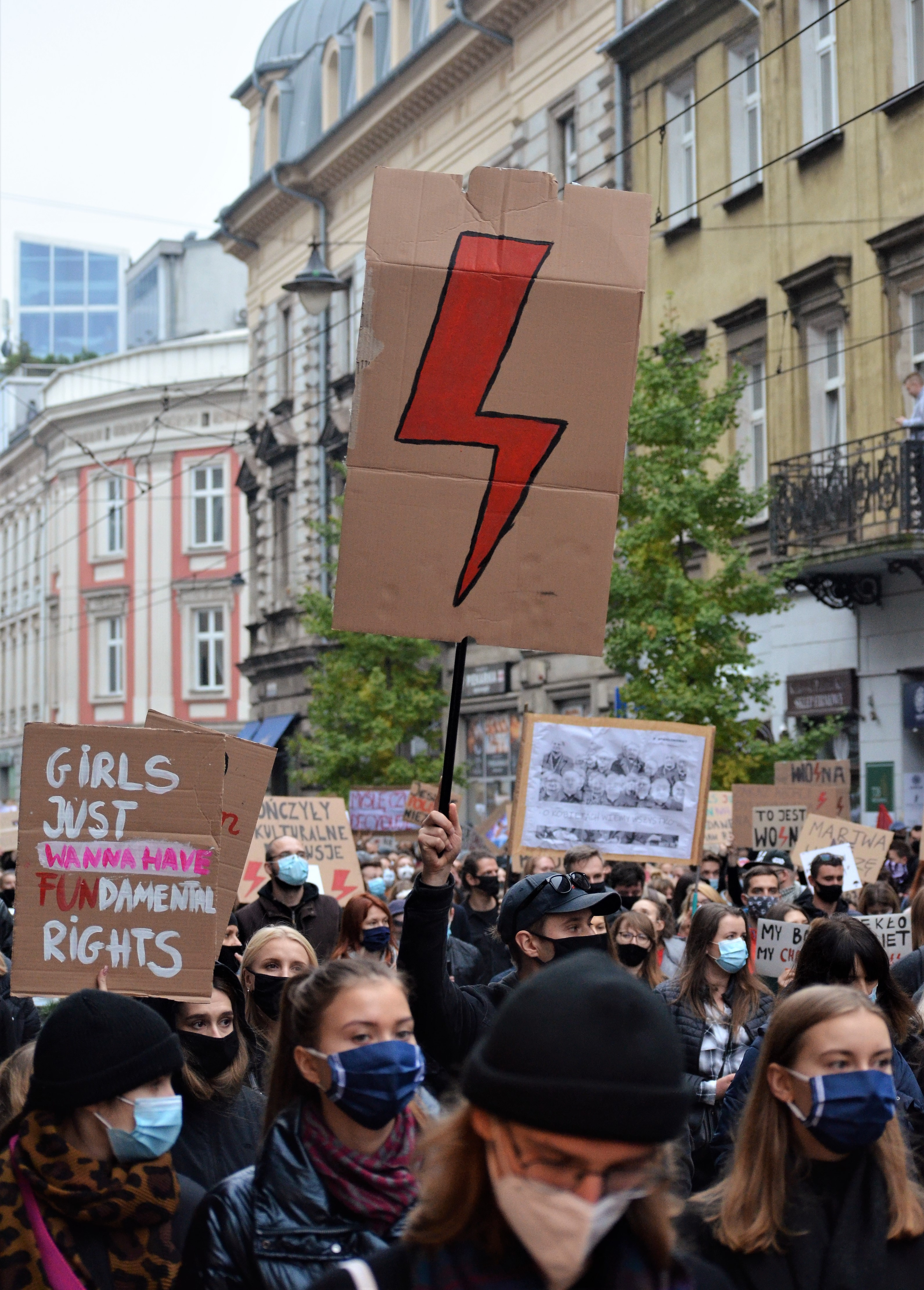
October 2020 Polish protests were caused by severe changes to abortion laws.

- Austria: A May 2007 OGM survey examined Austrian opinion on the morality of abortion, asking, "Personally, do you think of abortion as a moral issue?" 20% of those polled replied, "yes, always", 59% replied "yes, under certain circumstances", 19% replied "no, never", and 2% replied that they were "not sure".
- Czech Republic: A May 2007 CVVM poll found that 72% believe abortion in the Czech Republic should be allowed "at the request of the woman", 19% that it should be allowed for "societal reasons", 5% that it should be allowed only if "a woman's health is at risk", 1% that it should be "banned".
- Republic of Ireland: A January 2010 Irish Examiner/RedC poll about abortion in Ireland found that 60% of 18- to 35-year-olds felt abortion should be legalised, and 10% had been in a relationship in which an abortion had taken place. A January 2010 opinion poll conducted by Millward Brown Landsdowne for the Pro Life Campaign found 70% of people questioned favored constitutional protection for the unborn under circumstances where intervention to save the mother's life was legal. A January 2013 Paddy Power/Red C poll of 1,002 adults found that 29% of voters believed that there should be a constitutional amendment to allow abortion "in any case where the woman requests it". Support was highest at 37% within the 18- to 35-year-old age group. In 2018, The Thirty-sixth amendment of the constitution of Ireland, was voted for by 66.40% of the Irish population, receiving a majority in all constituency of the republic apart from Donegal
- Great Britain: A January 2010 Angus Reid Public Opinion poll asked "Do you think abortion should be legal under any circumstances, legal only under certain circumstances, or illegal in all circumstances?" 36% responded that they believe abortion should be legal in all circumstances, 55% that it should be legal in certain circumstances, and 3% that it should be illegal in all circumstances.
- Poland: An April 2019 Kantar poll in Poland found 58% of Poles supported women to have the right to abortion on-demand up to the 12th week of pregnancy, 35% opposed and 7% had no opinion. A poll from 28 October 2020 found that 22% of Poles supported abortion-on demand, 62% only in certain cases and 11% thought it should be completely illegal.
- The Netherlands: A September 2023 poll showed that 86% of the population above the age of 25 believed that woman should be able to choose to get an abortion. The poll also found that only 9% of people believed that abortion is murder, compared to the 13% of the people in a 2017 poll.

==== 2005 poll of ten countries ====
A May 2005 Euro RSCG/TNS Sofres poll examined attitudes toward abortion in 10 European countries, asking polltakers whether they agreed with the statement, "If a woman doesn't want children, she should be able to have an abortion". Results were as follows:

| Country | "Very much" | "A little" | "Not really" | "Not at all" |
|---|---|---|---|---|
| Czech Republic | 66% | 15% | 8% | 10% |
| Finland | 54% | 20% | 9% | 13% |
| France | 55% | 23% | 8% | 13% |
| Germany | 40% | 24% | 10% | 24% |
| Italy | 29% | 24% | 16% | 25% |
| Netherlands | 37% | 22% | 11% | 26% |
| Poland | 23% | 24% | 19% | 29% |
| Portugal | 32% | 20% | 12% | 30% |
| Spain | 41% | 18% | 8% | 27% |
| United Kingdom | 43% | 23% | 10% | 19% |

==== Eastern Europe/Eurasia study ====
An April 2003 CDC/ORC Macro report examined sentiment on abortion among women aged 15 to 44 in six former-Comecon countries, asking, "Do you think that (in any situation) a woman always has (or should have) the right to decide about her (own) pregnancy, including whether to have an abortion?" The results were:

| Country | Azerbaijan (2001) | Czech Republic (1993) | Georgia (1999) | Moldova (1997) | Romania (1999) | Russia (1996) |
|---|---|---|---|---|---|---|
| Yes | 80% | 85% | 79% | 81% | 78% | 72% |
| No | 20% | 15% | 21% | 19% | 22% | 28% |

Among those whose response was "no" above, it was then asked if abortion would be acceptable under selected circumstances. Positive responses to this subsequent question were:

| Country | Azerbaijan (2001) | Czech Republic (1993) | Georgia (1999) | Moldova (1997) | Romania (1999) | Russia (1996) |
|---|---|---|---|---|---|---|
| If the pregnancy endangers woman's life | 83% | 91% | 80% | 71% | 69% | N/A |
| If the child might be born deformed | 80% | 74% | 80% | 88% | 70% | N/A |
| If pregnancy endangers woman's health | 70% | 72% | 70% | 38% | 52% | N/A |
| If pregnancy resulted from rape | 67% | 71% | 40% | 43% | 42% | N/A |
| If family cannot afford to support the child | 65% | 16% | 23% | 32% | 29% | N/A |
| If the woman is not married | 66% | 8% | 22% | 16% | 23% | N/A |

=== North and Central America ===
- Canada: A December 2001 Gallup poll about abortion in Canada, asked, "Do you think abortions should be legal under any circumstances, legal only under certain circumstances or illegal in all circumstances and in what circumstances?" 32% responded that they believe abortion should be legal in all circumstances, 52% that it should be legal in certain circumstances, and 14% that it should be legal in no circumstances.
- Mexico: A November 2005 IMO poll about abortion in Mexico found that 73.4% think abortion should not be legalized while 11.2% think it should.
- Nicaragua: An August–September 2006 Greenberg Quinlan Rosner Research poll on the legality of abortion to save a woman's life found that 20% of respondents felt strongly that it should be "legal", 49% felt somewhat that it should be "legal", 18% felt strongly that it should be "illegal", and 10% felt somewhat that it should be "illegal".
- Panama: A May 2005 Dichter & Neira/La Prensa poll found that 89.4% disagreed with abortion and 8.3% agreed.
- Canada: A January 2010 Angus Reid Public Opinion poll found that 40% of Canadians think abortion should be permitted in all cases, while 31% support it with some restrictions; 41% say the health care system should pay for abortions only in emergency cases; 53% say under-aged girls should need parental consent for abortions.
- United States: A 2022 study that reviewing existing literature and public opinion datasets found that 43.8% in the U.S. are consistently "pro-choice" whereas 14.8% are consistently "pro-life." Support for abortion has gradually increased over time in the U.S. since the Roe v. Wade ruling.
- United States: A January 2010 Angus Reid Public Opinion poll found that 30% of Americans think abortion should be permitted only in cases of rape, incest, or to save the woman's life; 44% agree with banning abortion coverage through insurance companies subsidized by the government, while 42% disagree; 31% claim pregnant women don't have enough information about alternatives to abortion.
- United States: A February 2007 CBS News poll about abortion in the U.S. asked, "What is your personal feeling about abortion?", and 30% said that it should be "permitted only in cases such as rape, incest or to save the woman's life", 31% said that abortion should be "permitted in all cases", 16% that it should be "permitted, but subject to greater restrictions than it is now", 12% said that it should "only be permitted to save the woman's life", and 5% said that it should "never" be permitted. The Gallup poll has obtained the following results:

Gallup opinion poll results in USA since 1975

| | 2003 Poll | | 2000 Poll | | 1996 Poll | |
| | Legal | Illegal | Legal | Illegal | Legal | Illegal |
| First trimester | 66% | 29% | 66% | 31% | 64% | 30% |
| Second trimester | 25% | 68% | 24% | 69% | 26% | 65% |
| Third trimester | 10% | 84% | 8% | 86% | 13% | 82% |

=== Oceania ===
- Australia: Since at least the 1980s, public opinion polls have shown a majority of Australians support abortion rights, and that support for abortion is increasing. In 2003, a poll by the Australian Survey of Social Attitudes found that 81% of Australians believe a woman should have the right to choose an abortion, and a 2007 poll by the same group found 4% of Australians are opposed to abortion in all circumstances.
- Hawaii: The 2023 American Values Atlas reported that 79% of people from Hawaii said that abortion should be legal in all or most cases.
- New Zealand: In a March 2019 poll 51% said abortion should be permitted whenever a woman decides she wants one, 25% in certain circumstances, such as if a woman has been raped, 10% only if the life of the mother is in danger and 4% never.

=== South America ===
- Argentina: A September 2011 survey conducted by the nonprofit organization Catholics for Choice found that 45% of Argentines are in favor of abortion for any reason in the first twelve weeks. This same poll conducted in September 2011 also suggests that most Argentines favor abortion being legal when a woman's health or life is at risk (81%), when the pregnancy is a result of rape (80%) or the fetus has severe abnormalities (68%).
- Brazil: In 2021, a survey conducted by PoderData, found that, 58% of Brazilians are against the legalization of abortion in Brazil, those who are favorable of legalization add up to 31%. Another 11% do not know or do not respond.
- Chile: A 2014 poll found that 70% of Chileans supported abortion if a mother's life is in danger, if a fetus is unviable or when a pregnancy is a result of rape. According to a Pew Research Center poll in 2014, in Chile, public opinion is divided on the issue; 47% say that abortion should be legal in all or most cases, while 49% say it should be illegal in all or most circumstances.
- Colombia: A September 2017 survey, conducted by the nonprofit Table for Life and Women's Health, found that 65% of Colombians believe that abortion should be legal for certain circumstances.
- Uruguay: A May 2007 Factum/El Espectador survey asked Uruguayans about a law under debate in their country's Senate, which would legalize abortion within the first 12 weeks of pregnancy, finding that 61% support the law, 27% oppose the law, and 12% are unsure about it.

== Attitudes by religion ==
Overall, religion is a clear determinant of certain group's opinion on abortion. While different religions elicit different levels of support for abortion, there are clear correlations between one's faith, and support/opposition for abortion policy. Thus, within the societal umbrella of abortion opinion, each religion provides a specific contribution to the society's overall position.

Information from Pew Research Center (2015).
| Religious Tradition | Legal in All/Most Cases | Illegal in All/Most Cases |
|---|---|---|
| Jehovah's Witness | 18% | 75% |
| Mormon | 27% | 70% |
| Evangelical Protestant | 33% | 63% |
| Catholic | 48% | 47% |
| Orthodox Christian | 53% | 45% |
| Historically Black Protestant | 52% | 42% |
| Muslim | 55% | 37% |
| Mainline Protestant | 60% | 35% |
| Hindu | 68% | 29% |
| Unaffiliated | 73% | 23% |
| Buddhist | 82% | 17% |
| Jewish | 83% | 15% |

...

=== Christianity ===
A 2024 Pew Research Center survey asked Christians in the U.S. whether abortion in all or most cases should be legal or illegal.

| Group | Legal | Illegal |
|---|---|---|
| White evangelical Protestant | 25% | 73% |
| White nonevangelical Protestant | 64% | 33% |
| Black Protestant | 71% | 26% |
| Catholic | 59% | 40% |
| Religiously unaffiliated | 86% | 13% |

==== Pentecostalism ====
A 2006 Pew Research Center survey of moral opinion among Pentecostals in 10 countries asked "... [Do] you think abortion can always be justified, sometimes be justified, or never be justified?"

| Country | "Always justified" | "Sometimes justified" | "Never justified" |
|---|---|---|---|
| Brazil | 4% | 16% | 79% |
| Chile | 4% | 23% | 71% |
| Guatemala | 3% | 10% | 85% |
| India (localities) | 9% | 19% | 68% |
| Kenya | n/a | 11% | 88% |
| Nigeria | 1% | 4% | 94% |
| Philippines | 0% | 3% | 97% |
| South Africa | 8% | 16% | 73% |
| South Korea | 0% | 45% | 54% |
| United States | 5% | 46% | 45% |

The poll also asked respondents whether they agreed with the statement, "The government should not interfere with a woman's ability to have an abortion".

| Country | "Completely agree" | "Mostly agree" | "Mostly disagree" | "Completely disagree" |
|---|---|---|---|---|
| Brazil | 35% | 13% | 15% | 34% |
| Chile | 22% | 24% | 23% | 25% |
| Guatemala | 31% | 27% | 11% | 28% |
| India (localities) | 24% | 22% | 18% | 33% |
| Kenya | 14% | 4% | 12% | 69% |
| Nigeria | 20% | 10% | 18% | 46% |
| Philippines | 12% | 13% | 18% | 56% |
| South Africa | 21% | 25% | 19% | 28% |
| South Korea | 6% | 56% | 31% | 3% |
| United States | 40% | 24% | 12% | 20% |

=== Buddhism ===
According to a 2014 poll by the Pew Research Center surveying 264 people, 82% of American Buddhists supported abortion in all or most cases, while 17% opposed legal abortion in all or most cases.

=== Hinduism ===
According to Hindu bioethics, abortion is only permitted when the mother's life is in danger. Many hindus believe in anti-abortion teaching, emphasizing Ahimsa and its intrinsic reverence for life. According to a 2020 poll, 53% of Hindus say that abortion is either “somewhat unacceptable” or “completely unacceptable.”

=== Islam ===
According to a 2014 poll by The Pew Research Center surveying 237 people, 55% of American Muslims supported legal abortion in all or most cases, while 37% are opposed to legal abortion in all or most cases.

=== Atheism ===
According to a 2014 poll by The Pew Research Center surveying 1,098 people, 87% of American atheists supported abortion's legality in all or most cases, and 11% opposed abortion's legality in all or most cases.

== Among physicians and OBGYNs ==
At the societal level, especially in lesser developed countries, it seems to be a challenge to determine what is the exact numerical stance of obstetricians's on abortion. But, a recent survey with a small sample of OBGYN trainees from 47 countries and spanning 4 continents, yielded some more results about the attitude of OBGYNs toward abortion. 77.5% percent of the OBGYNs in the study supported the legalization of abortion in their country. Another 13.9% support the legalization with restrictions, with only 5.9% saying no and 2.7% answering "not sure."

Some countries such as the United States have provided some idea of the level of support among physicians. A survey in the United States of more than 10,000 physicians (not only obstetricians) came to the result that 34% of physicians would perform an abortion in certain situations, even if it were against their own beliefs. Approximately 54% would not, and for the remaining 12%, it would depend on circumstances.

Additionally, one survey collected specific, more recent data on OBGYNs in the United States and their overall feelings about certain abortion policies, as well as the exact percentage of OBGYNs that are willing/able to perform abortions. For example, a recent study conducted after the Dobbs' decision found that "Nearly one in five (18%) office-based OBGYNs nationally say that they are providing abortion services", the same study also found that "Eight in ten OBGYNs approve of a recent policy change from the FDA that allows certified pharmacies to dispense medication abortion pills." This data, along with other material from this same article, seemed to suggest that the rate at which OBGYN's broadly support some form of abortion at a societal level conflicts with certain legal barriers preventing them from providing this service.

== See also ==
- Abortion debate
- Abortion law
