= Abortion in the Dominican Republic =

The Dominican Republic is one of 24 countries in the world and one of six in Latin America that has a complete ban on abortion. This complete ban includes situations in which a pregnant person’s life is at risk.

Abortion was banned in all circumstances in 1884. Abortion was then constitutionally prohibited on September 18, 2009, when Article 37 in the Dominican Republic’s 2010 constitution was ratified, declaring a right to life from conception.

== Abortion care and methods ==
Under Article 37 in the Dominican Republic, people with unplanned or unwanted pregnancies must choose between clandestine abortions and seeing their pregnancies through. Under these conditions, an estimated 90,000 unsafe abortions are conducted in the Dominican Republic each year. Since Article 37 was passed, unsafe abortion has risen to the third leading cause of maternal death in the country, now causing eight percent of maternal deaths. Researchers have found that 95-97% of the abortions are unsafe, meaning done by people lacking needed skills or in places that do not meet the minimum medical standards. (See Unsafe abortion.)

A common abortion method in the Dominican Republic is the use of over-the-counter drugs such as oxytocin, prostaglandins, ergot alkaloids, and misoprostol. They cause powerful uterine contractions, leading to the expulsion of the fetus. When taken clandestinely, pregnant people do so without knowing the proper dosage. Overdose on these drugs can cause serious complications.

A common complication of overdose includes hemorrhages. In these cases, the uterus may be incompletely cleaned out, leading to infection, or even perforation, causing internal bleeding. If a pregnant person survives such complications, they may have reproductive problems in the future. Other complications which stem from unsafe abortions can include incomplete abortions, infection, and injury.

There is a history of health complications related to abortions in the Dominican Republic. In a 2021 study by BMJ Global Health in 2018, researchers found that the rate of post-abortion complications is the highest in the world in the Dominican Republic, where the rate is 10.3 per 1000 women from ages 15 to 44 years. It is estimated that 10 percent of the maternity beds in hospitals are typically occupied by women who experience problems from unsafe abortions. An estimated 25,000 women and girls are hospitalized each year as a result of complications from miscarriages and abortions, of which many are clandestine. The BMJ Global Health study also found that post-abortion care in the Dominican Republic is almost non-existent and there is a lack of information regarding post-abortion care.

People who appear at hospitals for post-abortion treatment cannot name their practitioner because they risk that person’s arrest.

This legal stigma and lack of information can cause people to delay or avoid receiving healthcare after abortions. People who need abortions are thus inclined to seek out alternatives to proper care, even with the increased risk of complications that are associated.

== Law ==
Article 317 of the Dominican Criminal Code, which outlawed all forms of induced abortion, was established in 1884.

Prior to recent steps by the Dominican Republic to affirm its long-standing position against abortion, efforts were made in the twentieth century to increase access. In the early 1990s, a new health code was put into place to create exceptions to the existing rule against abortion. Abortion was thus allowed in the event that a mother’s physical or mental health would be jeopardized as a result of a pregnancy or in cases where the baby would be born disabled or deformed.

In October 2009, the Dominican Republic ratified an amendment to the Dominican Constitution, Article 37, which guaranteed a right to life from conception until death in all circumstances, including in cases of rape, incest, a non-viable pregnancy, and when the pregnant person’s life is threatened.

However, there have been movements to amend the Dominican Constitution to decriminalize abortion. In 2021 a debate began about a proposal that would decriminalize abortion in three cases: When the pregnant person’s life is threatened, when the pregnancy would not be viable even if carried to term, and when the pregnancy was caused by incest or rape. As the law stands in 2023, if someone terminates a pregnancy, they can be sentenced to up to two years in prison. The medical practitioners who provide this care can be sentenced to up to twenty years. This bill was debated in the Chamber of Deputies, but it did not pass.

The current president of the Dominican Republic, President Luis Abinador, has not made a move to decriminalize abortion, but has suggested a referendum in which the people decide. Human Rights Watch has argued that a referendum would be inappropriate in this case because fundamental human rights related to reproductive and sexual health are being threatened.

Article 37, as previously indicated, uses "the right to life" as a means of criminalizing individuals who seek abortion care. In the Dominican Republic, those impacted by this law attempted to amend the language of the constitution to give them access in cases where their lives were in danger, but their request was rejected. Because doctors did not want to risk facing criminal charges for performing illegal abortions, Article 37 resulted in a drastic reduction of abortions that are performed by medical professionals.

Despite having laws that make seeking an abortion illegal and punishable, the Dominican Republic is still required by its constitution to uphold the domestic application of the Convention on the Elimination of All Forms of Discrimination Against Women (CEDAW). CEDAW has provisions that require the rights of women to be enforced by all its signatories, including the right to have an abortion. Enforcement will provide citizens of the Dominican Republic with the right to reproductive choice and ensure that they have access to the tools to exercise that right. Because part of the right to reproductive choice has been construed to include the freedom to make individual abortion decisions, which is severely prohibited in Article 37, this constitutional need is complicated by its violation of that provision. Currently, the Dominican Republic is compelled by its constitution to both offer women access to abortion services and to outlaw them completely.

=== Results of legal restrictions ===
Up until October 2012, women who had abortions could seek medical care without fear of arrest or interrogation.

In October 2012, the Dominican Republic debated Article 90 of the Penal Code, which prescribes criminal penalties for women who seek an abortion and for those who provide it or help provide it. Amnesty International appealed to Parliament to consider decriminalizing abortion, with the following statement:

The proposed penal code flies in the face of women's and girls' human rights and maintains a situation in which health professionals are prevented from providing the best care for their patients, The criminalization of abortion in all circumstances, as maintained in the new legislation, violates women's rights to life, health and not to suffer torture or ill treatment and discrimination and it goes against international human rights commitments made by the Dominican Republic.

The appeal pointed out that unsafe abortion and fear of prosecution contribute to the high rate of maternal mortality that the World Health Organization reports in the country.

Nevertheless, the Chamber of Deputies approved prison terms for inducing or helping with an abortion. "Abortion will also be punished with from 2 to 3 years and includes women who induce or a person who helps. If a doctor, nurse, midwife, surgeon, pharmacist or other professional helps induce an abortion, the penalty would be from 4 to 10 years."

In July 2012, the Dominican Republic's harsh anti-abortion laws came under fire when a 16-year-old girl known as "Esperancita" was suffering from acute leukemia and was being denied treatment for her cancer because her chemotherapy might harm or kill the fetus. Doctors reportedly feared that they would be prosecuted or lose their right to practice medicine if they treated her. It took 10 weeks of debate before lawmakers decided that it would not be illegal for Esperancita to receive treatment to save her life. Dr. Antonio Cabrera reported that Esperancita had died on August 17, 2012, shortly after suffering a miscarriage followed by cardiac arrest. She was 13 weeks pregnant at the time of her miscarriage.

== Activism ==
=== Abortion-rights movement ===
The abortion-rights movement in the Dominican Republic is focused largely on creating exceptions to Article 37 and more recent work to overturn restrictions on abortion access. These exceptions include cases in which the mother’s life or health is at risk, or in which the pregnancy was the result of rape or incest. These have come to be known as "Las Tres Casuales", or "the three causes", among abortion rights supporters.

Regarding the adoption of Article 37, The Dominican Gynecology and Obstetrics Society warned that the number of maternal deaths will increase considerably, because pregnancies can not be interrupted. The society's president, Aldrian Almonte, said the current figure of 160 deaths for each 100,000 live births per year will increase, because doctors would be reluctant to proceed from fear of being charged in cases where they must decide on the interruption of a pregnancy to preserve the parent's life.

Protest marches were held by the National Resistance to Constitutional Backwardness and the Women's Forum for Constitutional Reform. Feminist Denise Paiewonsky asked Congress to amend the article before adopting it; otherwise it would limit women's options for reproductive health. If not one fertilized egg could be discarded, the amendment would outlaw both in vitro fertilization and forms of contraception such as the intrauterine device (IUD) and the day-after pill. The article was adopted without these amendments

On July 15, 2018, a group of abortion rights supporters protested the criminalization of abortion in all circumstances. This protest took place in Santo Domingo and was referred to as Caminata por la Vida, la Salud, y la Dignidad de las Mujeres: Aborto en tres casuale (March for Life, Health, and Dignity of Women: Abortion in Three Cases). The protesters argued that abortion should be legalized if one of "the three causes" were present. The groups that came out to protest included members of the Tertulia Feminista Magaly Pineda (Magaly Pineda Feminist Gathering), a group that has been active since 2016 in support of constitutional reform. Other groups at the protest were the Coloquio Mujeres (Women’s Colloquium), which has been active since 2017 in the fight for abortion access, and the Consejo Nacional Para la Mujer Campesina (National Council for Campesina Women, CONAMUCA), one of the oldest feminist groups that has been active since the 1970s.

Abortion rights supporters gained ground in late 2020 when President Luis Abinader stated his support for the three causes. Abinader later walked back his position after backlash from the Catholic Church, saying instead he should not impose his personal opinion on the country.

In March 2021, as a new penal code that maintained an absolute ban on abortion was being discussed in Congress, a group of activists set up camp outside The National Palace. The group called for exceptions for the tres causales, which Abinader had previously supported. The activists camped outside the National Palace for over two months and organized a large rally on March 23, 2021, in support of the causales. Although the process to approve the penal code is ongoing, the bill has moved forward without exceptions to the ban. Activists have tried to protect abortion rights through congress but have largely been unsuccessful. In February 2023, a senator from Perreme introduced a bill that included exceptions for the three causes. Constitutional lawyers have called this move a “fiction” because they believe that the bill will likely not pass the Senate.

Organizations such as the United Nations Program for Human Development, Amnesty International, and the Association of Housewives Committees have also condemned the government’s moves to criminalize abortion.

Abortion rights supporters in the Dominican Republic also argue for education in schools about sexual and reproductive health, broader access to general health services, and increasing access to education for young women who are pregnant or have children. A new program to add incentive for using contraceptives was designed to give students an idea of the workload involved in caring for a newborn baby. Called "Bebé, Piénsalo Bien", the program was sponsored by The Dominican Republic's First Lady, Margarita Cedeño de Fernández. In May 2006 as a pilot program was launched at one school in Santo Domingo. The project lends electronic babies to students for a weekend. The program also urges parents to talk about pregnancy and child-rearing with their children.

=== Anti-abortion movement ===
The anti-abortion movement has historically received support from both the Roman Catholic Church and Dominican national government. The Dominican Catholic Church, which has played an active role in the fight against abortion, holds the belief that the right to life must remain absolute. In response to 2021 debates surrounding the decriminalization of abortion, the Catholic Church has maintained its same zero-tolerance position on abortion. Since the Dominican Republic ratified Article 37, anti-abortion efforts by the national government have acted primarily as a response to the abortion rights movement. Following 2021 activism in favor of decriminalization and recognition of "Las Tres Causales", the Dominican senate approved a new code in February 2023. Awaiting approval from the Chamber of Deputies and President Abinader, the legislation codifies punishments for abortion and does not make exceptions for "Las Tres Causales".

== Financial implications ==
Because abortion care is a clandestine operation in the Dominican Republic, there is no regulation on the cost of abortion. Pregnant individuals of higher socioeconomic status are able to afford more expensive clinics. These clinics are typically cleaner, have more experienced practitioners, and present a smaller risk of complication. These individuals may also choose to find services abroad. Poor and rural women are limited to more dangerous options, often without the care of a trained practitioner, so are more likely to suffer from complications. The doctors make an individual agreement with each individual. They may demand that someone seeking an abortion sign a contract freeing the doctor from all responsibility or liability, before they go ahead with the operation. These unregulated prices and lack of trained medical professionals have resulted in a lack of access to safe abortions.

20.5% of 15 to 19 year old women in the Dominican Republic become pregnant. According to Human Rights Watch, age creates another financial barrier to abortion, as young women are less likely to have the financial resources to access an abortion.

== See also ==
- Abortion and religion
- Abortion law
- Abortion in El Salvador
- Abortion in Malta
- Abortion in Nicaragua
- Reproductive rights in Latin America
