= Abortion in Honduras =

Abortion in Honduras is completely prohibited under any circumstance, and has been constitutionally prohibited since 1982. The country's constitutional prohibition on abortion was further cemented by the country's Congress on January 22, 2021. In order to change this law, a three-quarters majority in the Congress will be required, or 96 out of 128 votes.

The country's prohibition causes detrimental effects on the human rights of women and girls in Honduras, particularly survivors of rape. Like in its neighbors Nicaragua and El Salvador, abortion is prohibited even in cases of rape, even though United Nations experts have found that denial of abortion can constitute torture in certain cases. This is worsened by the fact that Honduras has one of the worst rates of sexual violence. This has been cited as a reason for migration from the country.

This is compounded by the fact that Honduras also prohibits the use of emergency contraception, the only country in the region to do so. This law to prohibit the morning-after pill was vetoed by then-president Manuel Zelaya in 2009, but it was signed into law after he was removed in the 2009 Honduran coup d'état. It was upheld by the country's Supreme Court in 2012.

== Possible change ==
In 2021, the country elected Xiomara Castro as its first woman president. She has pledged to legalize abortion under circumstances of rape, risk to the mother's life, and deformities to the fetus, and also to make the morning-after pill accessible. Since the prohibition on emergency contraception was written by executive order, it can be reversed unilaterally. However, independent analysts state it will be difficult for her to secure the votes in Congress to change the prohibition on abortion.

In 2024, an indigenous Nahua woman using the pseudonym Fausia took a case to the United Nations with the support of the Centre for Reproductive Rights and the Centro de Derechos de la Mujer after she had been forced to proceed with a pregnancy after being raped due to the ban on abortion. The case argued that the UN should issue a directive calling on the Honduran government to enshrine abortion as an essential health service.

== See also ==
- Abortion in Nicaragua
- Abortion in El Salvador
- Reproductive rights in Latin America
