= Fausia =

Honduran reproductive rights activist

Fausia (born c. 1990) is the pseudonym used by an indigenous Honduran human rights activist who brought a case before the United Nations in 2024 after being raped and forced to continue with the pregnancy due to Honduras' total ban on abortion.

== Personal life ==
Fausia is a member of the Nahua people and was the daughter of a chieftain. At the time of her assault, she was the mother of two children. Fausia's family had lost land to a family and had been engaged in a legal battle over it for several years, which led to her becoming a land rights' activist for indigenous communities in Honduras.

Due to a fear of reprisals, Fausia has not shared her identity publicly.

== Assault and aftermath ==
In November 2015, Fausia was assaulted and raped by two men while fetching water from a river close to her home. She subsequently stated that the assailants had been linked to the family her own family had been locked in a legal battle with over usurped land; Fausia was held at knifepoint and raped by one of the men. She was threatened that she and her family would be killed if she reported the rape to the police force.

Fausia reported the rape to the police around a month after it occurred. In 2017, the assailants were arrested, but were released after a few months, with investigators stating that there was insufficient evidence. Fausia reached out for support from the Centre for Reproductive Rights and the Centro de Derechos de la Mujer, and following pressure, the investigation was reopened in 2018. In 2024, the attackers were sentenced and given custodial prison sentences.

Shortly after initially reporting the rape, Fausia found out that she was pregnant. At that time, there was a total ban on emergency contraception in addition to abortion. When Fausia sought medical advice at a local hospital, she reported that she was told that if she had an abortion she would be reported, arrested and sentenced to ten years in prison.

Fausia reported experiencing psychological trauma during the pregnancy and following the child's birth, including suicidal thoughts and a suicide attempt. She has not commented on what happened to the child following its birth. Due to harassment she and her family experienced from the assailants, she reported having to move on at least ten occasions before relocating entirely to the Honduran capital, Tegucigalpa.

== Response ==
Abortion in Honduras is explicitly banned in its constitution, and since 2020 the penal code has criminalised it in all cases. In April 2024, the Centre for Reproductive Rights and the Centro de Derechos de la Mujer, who had supported Fausia following the rape and had played a role in the reopening of the investigation into the crime, shared that they were supporting Fausia to present the case before the United Nations Human Rights Committee.

The case argued that the Honduran government had violated Fausia's human rights by imposing pregnancy and forced motherhood on her, violating her right to reproductive autonomy. They argued for the UNHRC to issue a directive mandating that Honduras amend its legislative framework and constitution that prohibited abortion in all cases, and for it to instead regulate access to abortion as an essential health service. They also called for reparations to be paid to Fausia.
