= Abortion in Liberia =

In Liberia, abortion is only legal in cases of rape, fetal impairment, or risk to the mother's physical or mental health or life, up to the 24th week of pregnancy. About 32% of women have had abortions, which Liberians call "spoiling the belly". Unsafe abortions are common and account for 15% of maternal deaths in the country. Self-induced abortions are common. Medical abortion is legally restricted. Post-abortion care is available from public and private facilities.

Liberia's abortion law is from 1976. The Legislature of Liberia introduced a bill to legalize abortion in 2020. The legislature began debating the revision in 2022 after it was introduced by Senator Augustine Chea. Pro-abortion advocacy groups have said it will reduce the high rate of unsafe abortions. Religious leaders have opposed it, saying it violates fetal rights. As of 2024, the bill is being debated.

== Legislation ==
Section 16.1 of the penal code of Liberia criminalizes abortion without a legal defense, and Section 16.3 sets the gestational limit at 24 weeks of pregnancy. A 1976 law permits abortion in the cases of rape, incest, risk to the physical or mental health of the mother, or risk to the life of the mother or the fetus. Police and judiciary investigations are required in the case of rape or incest, and medical exemptions require written agreement from two physicians. The law defines that pregnancy begins after complete implantation and specifically does not apply to actions taken to prevent pregnancy.

== History ==
In July 1976, an amendment to the penal code received presidential approval, which included Section 16.3 on abortion. Liberia legalized the abortion pill mifepristone before 1996.

=== Proposed amendment (2022) ===
In February 2020, a revision to the Public Health Bill addressing abortion was introduced to the Legislature of Liberia. The proposal would amend Section 16.3 to legalize abortion for socioeconomic reasons. It would lower the limit for legal abortions to the fourteenth week of pregnancy. Deputy Health Minister Varfee Tulay said the limit would emphasize that the law intends to avoid maternal deaths rather than promote widespread abortions. If passed, the law will be one of the most liberal in Africa, where a vast majority of women live in places with restrictive laws.

On 13 June 2022, a joint committee began debating the bill. The debate was introduced by Augustine Chea of Sinoe County, who was chair of the Senate Health Committee and a member of the Senate Judiciary Committee. Speaking to the Women's Legislative Caucus as a proxy for President Pro Tempore Albert Tugbe Chie, Chea said his goal was to stop abortion being a criminal offense. The House of Representatives passed the law. The proposal addressed sex education and family planning, as well as other major health issues, despite a public perception that there was a standalone bill about abortion. A special session convened on 22 August 2023 and adjourned on 5 September after anti-abortion groups called for the legislature to reject the bill. As of February 2024, the Senate is reviewing the law. The Coalition for Democratic Change opposes the proposal. The party's Secretary General, Jefferson Tamba Koijee, argued that the bill would threaten population growth.

Advocates for legalizing abortion have cited high rates of illegal abortions in Liberia and the risk of complications. An anonymous group of senators told the Liberian Observer, "Don't you think it's finally time for a change? Yes. Having an illegal abortion may cause more deaths because it is done in backyard clinics and sometimes we throw our babies in dumpsites because most women can't even afford a daily meal or provide a good home for the children." The Community Health Initiative, an advocacy group campaigning for the law, worked with the national government to form coalitions and led workshops with journalists to report on the topic. The national not-for-profit organization Sister AID Liberia held media dialogues to discuss prevention of unsafe abortions. Vice President Jewel Howard Taylor voiced support for the law in an interview with state broadcaster ELBC-FM.

Many religious and traditional leaders believe abortion is against Christian teachings and local traditions. Opponents have argued that prioritizing abortion rights ignored the rights of the unborn child. Bishop Kortu K. Brown, former president of the Liberian Council of Churches, has been a vocal protestor. His organization, the Campaign to Stop Abortion in Liberia, urges citizens to write to their representatives opposing the bill. Members of Liberia's Religious Council criticized the Swedish Embassy and other organizations that funded activism supporting legal abortion. Swedish ambassador Urban Sjöström defended the country's support for legal abortion, and the embassy denied allegations of bribing lawmakers. A Republican member of the United States House of Representatives, Chris Smith, called for Liberian legislators to reject the bill and for the US Congress to investigate whether Joe Biden's administration had illegally advocated for legal abortion in Liberia.

== Prevalence ==
According to a report by the Ministry of Health, 38,779 abortions occurred in Liberia in 2021, equalling 30.7 per 1,000 women (of reproductive age), or 229 per 1000 live births. The country's abortion rate increased from 28 per 1,000 women in 1990–1994 to 42 per 1,000 women in 2015–2019. In the latter period, 49% of pregnancies were unintended and 40% of unintended pregnancies resulted in abortion. (Note: This equates to 19.6% of all pregnancies in this period being unintentional pregnancies resulting in abortion.) As of 2015, the only representative survey of abortion in Liberia is the 2007 Demographic and Health Survey, in which 6% of women, speaking face-to-face, reported having had abortions. Anecdotal evidence and statistical analysis indicate that 32% of women have had abortions as of 2013.

In Liberia, abortion is referred to as "spoiling the belly" or "taking the belly". Backstreet abortions are commonly available. Some providers are nurses who use speculums and syringes, some use knives or sharp bones, and others use remedies such as herbs, ground avocado, or chalk. A 2013 study of six counties of Liberia found that over 10% of women had undergone unsafe abortions. Many young women have performed self-induced abortions by vaginally inserting cassava, chalks, or an herb mixture known as "rocket-propelled grenade". This sometimes results in fatal sepsis. Some have drunk water mixed with ground glass or an herb known as "Christmas leaf". The most common demographics recorded to have unsafe abortions are young women, students, and people who have previously been pregnant. Risks include sepsis, which accounts for 15% of maternal deaths in Liberia, and haemorrhage. Septic abortions are a common cause of tetanus.

Liberia has no government-supported training for abortion providers. Medical abortion is provided by private organizations that import registered abortion pills, but distribution is legally restricted. Public and private facilities such as Planned Parenthood offer post-abortion care. Some unsafe abortions result in severe pain or the need to remove the uterus. Liberia's standard treatment guidelines include misoprostol for post-abortion care and haemorrhage treatment. Most cases of unsafe abortion requiring surgery are referred to the John F. Kennedy Maternity Center in Monrovia, the only tertiary medical facility in the country. The center's exploratory laparotomy surgeries have a fatality rate of 22.4%, as of 2022. Delays in treatment contribute to the fatality rate, caused by cost of travel, fear of legal or social ramifications of abortion, or time taken by primary care.
