= Abortion in Samoa =

Abortion in Samoa is only legal if the abortion will save the mother's life or preserve her physical or mental health and only when the gestation period is less than 20 weeks. In Samoa, if an abortion is performed on a woman for any other reason, or if a woman performs a self-induced abortion, the violator is subject to seven years in prison.

== History ==
Samoan abortion law was defined in the Crimes Ordinance 1961 and amended by the Crimes Amendment Act of 1969.

=== Crimes Ordinance 1961 ===
The Crimes Ordinance 1961 implicitly defined abortion as an action which caused the death of an unborn child and was not taken in good faith for preservation of the life of the mother. This carried a prison term of up to fourteen years if the action was deemed to be murder, or five years if the action was deemed to be manslaughter.

73. Killing unborn child

- (1) Every one is liable to imprisonment for a term not exceeding 14 years who causes the death of any child that has not become a human being in such a manner that he would have been guilty of murder if the child had become a human being.
- (2) Every one is liable to imprisonment for a term not exceeding 5 years who causes the death of any child that has not become a human being in such a manner that he would have been guilty of manslaughter if the child had become a human being.
- (3) No one is guilty of any crime who before or during the birth of any child causes its death by means employed in good faith for the preservation of the life of the mother.
— Crimes Ordinance 1961 §73

=== Crimes Amendment Act of 1969 ===
Crimes Amendment Act of 1969 inserted §§ 73A–73D into Crimes Ordinance 1961, explicitly defining abortion and stating that a violator of the following is liable to imprisonment for a term not exceeding seven years.

- Procuring abortion (§§73A)
- Female procuring her own miscarriage (§§73B)
- Supplying means of procuring abortion (§§73C)
  - Effectiveness of means used immaterial (§§73D)

=== Crimes Act 2013 ===
Crimes Ordinance 1961 was replaced by the Crimes Act 2013, stating that the following are illegal and the violator is liable to imprisonment for a term not exceeding seven years:

- Procuring abortion by any means (§112)
- Female procuring her own miscarriage (§113)
- Supplying means of procuring abortion (§114)
  - Effectiveness of means used immaterial (§115)

Unless:

[...] in the case of a pregnancy of not more than 20 weeks’ gestation, the person doing the act:
- (a) is a registered medical practitioner; and
- (b) believes that the continuance of the pregnancy would result in serious danger (not being danger normally attendant upon childbirth) to the life, or to the physical or mental health, of the woman or girl. — Crimes Act 2013 §116

== Current Events ==
=== National HIV, AIDS, and STI Policy 2017–2022 ===
In 2017, the Samoan Ministry of Health produced a document entitled National HIV, AIDS, and STI Policy 2017–2022 containing an analysis of abortion law in the Crimes Act 2013. This argues that the term "serious danger to [...] mental health" would potentially apply to suicide risk, rape, incest, and childhood pregnancy. This analysis clashes with the WHO Abortion Policies Database on the subject.

The cases above demonstrate, given the definition of ‘unlawfully’, the abortion provisions do not apply where the pregnant woman was contemplating suicide or was raped. Presumably the provision regarding serious danger to the ‘mental health’ of the woman or girl would extend to further circumstances. For example, where pregnancy is the product of an incestuous relationship, where the pregnant girl is very young and arguably other circumstances that would create significant negative emotional consequences for the woman where it is believed this would lead to a serious danger to her mental health — National HIV, AIDS, and STI Policy 2017–2022 pp.60

The document called for the law to be amended to address abortion for HIV positive women as well as "a legal analysis to assess the law, the interpretation, the inconsistency of case law, and ultimate population access to quality services".

Prime Minister Tuilaepa Lupesoliai Sailele Malielegaoi opposed these recommendations stating

“Government will never ever accept legalizing abortion for any purposes regardless.
“It is murder and similar to giving our women the license to kill.
“And that is absolutely against our religious Christian values, and beliefs. It's also totally against our culture and our way of life.

— Prime Minister Tuilaepa Lupesoliai Sailele Malielegaoi, Statement from Ministry of the Prime Minister and Cabinet Press Secretary

=== Committee on the Elimination of Discrimination against Women ===
In 2018, the Committee on the Elimination of Discrimination against Women (CEDAW) recommended that the state party should amend the Crimes Act.

Amend the Crimes Act to legalize abortion, at least in cases of rape, incest, severe fetal impairment and risk to the health or life of the pregnant woman, and to decriminalize abortion in all other cases, and set a clear timetable for implementation; — Concluding observations on the sixth periodic report of Samoa

== See also ==
- Abortion law
- Abortion debate
- Religion and abortion
- Societal attitudes towards abortion
