= Abortion in Cape Verde =

Abortion in Cape Verde has been legal upon request prior to 12 weeks gestation since 1986. After 12 weeks, a woman in Cape Verde can obtain a legal abortion if the pregnancy poses a risk to her physical or mental health or if the fetus is impaired. Cape Verde is one of only six countries in Africa to permit elective abortions, alongside Guinea-Bissau, Mozambique, Sao Tome and Principe, South Africa and Tunisia.

== Mexico City policy ==
On January 23, 2017, Donald Trump reinstated the Mexico City policy, a gag order that bans funding to American NGOs who perform, promote, or mention abortion as a family planning option. Some experts project this policy will cause 6.5 million unintended pregnancies, 2.1 million unsafe abortions, and 21,700 maternal deaths.

In response to the funding shortfall this will cause, particularly for women in developing countries, Cape Verde joined seven other nations in an initiative to raise funds for women's health.
