= Abortion in Trinidad and Tobago =

In Trinidad and Tobago, abortion is illegal save for few exceptions. The respective laws are in place since 1925.

== Laws ==
Trinidad and Tobago was a colony under British rule until 1962. Consequently, many of their statutes replicate those in the UK, including the Offences Against the Person Act of 1925 which states abortion is illegal.

The UK case of Rex v Bourne of 1938 is highly influential, even to this day, in Trinidad and Tobago abortion laws. Dr. Bourne was tried under the Offences Against the Person Act for administering an abortion to a 15 year old who had been raped by a group of soldiers. In this case, the prosecution's duty was to prove beyond reasonable doubt that the operation was not performed in good faith for the well-being of the girl. The judge ruled that it was Bourne's responsibility as a doctor to terminate the pregnancy if, on reasonable grounds and with adequate knowledge, he was of the belief that the result of the pregnancy would lead to deterioration of the girl's physical and/or mental health. Thereafter, Bourne was acquitted. (5)

Abortion is only permitted if it will:

- Save the life of the woman
- Preserve physical and or mental health

Permission to abort is not permitted for:

- Rape or incest
- Fetal impairment
- Economic or social reasons
- Available upon request

The punishment for a woman who has an abortion is four years in prison, and the punishment for a doctor or other person who performs the procedure is the same. Aiding in the process of finding someone to perform an abortion or other preliminary steps is also illegal, and subject to a two-year prison sentence.

== Common practice ==
An abortion is one of the most common surgical procedures in Trinidad and Tobago, and most occur during the first 12 weeks of pregnancy.

According to the World Health Organization (WHO), an unsafe abortion is "a procedure for terminating an unwanted pregnancy either by persons lacking the necessary skills or in an environment lacking the minimal medical standards or both". Unsafe abortions in Trinidad and Tobago have led to increased rates of maternal morbidity and hospital visits.

In Trinidad and Tobago, the maternal mortality rate (MMR) is 55 per 100,000 live births.

Although the law states that abortion is allowed to save a woman's mental health, the law does not give a clear definition of what mental health issues are included. Therefore, it can be difficult for health practitioners, lawyers, and midwives to judge when the law should be followed as far as mental health is concerned. For this very reason, many doctors are hesitant to perform abortions, and costs are very high. Women who can afford expensive but safe abortions at private practices and hospitals are the only ones who remain unaffected. The lack of safe resources has forced women who are either young or poor to seek out cheaper, life-threatening methods to terminate unwanted pregnancies, where they eventually end up in the hospital. The drug Cytotec (misoprostol), taken without adequate medical guidance or follow-up care, is used to conduct unsafe but cheap abortions.

This is a widespread issue that is so common that the majority, if not all public hospitals have an entire ward set aside for women suffering from unsafe abortion complications. The complications that stem from underground abortions cost 1 million TT dollars per month. Treatment includes surgery, blood transfusions, medications, and overnight stays (20). Unsafe abortions can lead to sepsis, hemorrhage, cervical complications, or uterine perforations, with the most historically common problems in emergency rooms being sepsis and hemorrhage. The women that do not seek out medical attention have issues with infertility, pelvic problems including pelvic inflammatory disease and chronic pelvic pain.

== Current views ==
Although abortion is not permitted, other methods of contraceptives such as oral contraceptives, condoms, and tubal ligation are widely used and accepted. It appears that over the counter contraceptives have also become popular since the 1990s. Today, oral contraceptives, intrauterine devices (IUDs), and male and female condoms are available for free at public health institutions.

The Trinidadian government is connected to the Catholic Church, and many laws are based on Christian commandments. The Billings Ovulation Method of Natural Fertility Regulation has stated they operate under the Catholic Church's Archdiocesan Family Life Commission. The Catholic Church, and therefore the government believe sexual intercourse serves only the purpose of connecting marriage and/or conceiving babies. An alternative solution to legalizing all abortions known as the Billings Ovulation Method has been proposed from the church alongside the Billings Ovulation Method of Natural Fertility Regulation. This method suggests women should observe symptoms in her body that indicate whether she is fertile or infertile, and this will determine whether or not the couple should engage or abstain in sexual activities.

Advocates for Safe Parenthood: Improving Reproductive Equity (ASPIRE) is a non-profit organization in Trinidad and Tobago that advocate for abortion law reform, better sexual education in schools, and contraceptive delivery services. They were the first organization to consistently strive to fight the government's views and laws on abortion rights and established in 1999. They have participated in conducting studies on women's health records concerning abortion, created model policies and laws, public media campaigns, and surveys over the past decade.

== Related issues ==
The United Nations reports that there has been a decline in the 1990s of contraceptive usage due to access and supply limitations. The Government of Trinidad and Tobago also thinks that fertility and population rates are too high.

== See also ==
- Abortion law
