= Rh factor testing =

Blood test

Rh factor testing, also known as Rhesus factor testing, is the procedure of determining the Rhesus D status of an individual (see Rh blood group system).

== Background ==
Rhesus factor testing utilizes genotyping to detect the presence of the RhD gene. By checking the existence of the RhD gene in the individual's genome, the presence of Rhesus D (RhD) antigens can be inferred. Individuals with a positive RhD status have RhD antigens expressed on the cell membrane of their red blood cells, whereas Rhesus D antigens are absent for individuals with a negative RhD status.

Rhesus factor testing is usually performed on pregnant women to determine the RhD blood group of the mother and the fetus. By confirming the RhD status of both mother and fetus, precautions can be made, if necessary, to prevent any medical complications caused by Rhesus incompatibility.

=== Rhesus factor ===
The entire Rh blood group system involves multiple antigens and genes. For Rh factor testing, however, only the Rhesus factor correlated to the RhD antigen is assayed. The RhD gene that codes for the RhD antigen is located on chromosome 1. This chromosome contains gene instructions for making proteins in the body. RhD is a dominant gene, meaning that as long as at least one RhD gene is inherited from a single parent, the RhD antigen is expressed. Vice versa, if no RhD gene is inherited from either parent, no RhD antigen is produced.

== Extraction of test samples ==
Non-invasive extraction

Blood plasma is commonly used as test samples for verifying the maternal RhD status. Blood plasma can also be used for determining the fetal RhD status if the mother is RhD- as maternal blood plasma contains maternal DNA and trace amounts of fetal DNA. In early pregnancy, around 3% of the mother's free-cell DNA is from the fetus, and raises to 6-7% by late pregnancy. Blood samples can be obtained through venipuncture of the mother. Since plasma and other components of blood have different densities, centrifugation of blood samples with added anticoagulant (such as EDTA) can segregate blood contents into multiple layers. Blood plasma can then be isolated from the other components. It can be genotyped using real time PCR to determine the RhD status of the fetus. The method of extracting fetal DNA from maternal blood plasma is considered to be a type of non-invasive prenatal testing.

=== Invasive extraction ===
Non-invasive prenatal testing can be used if the mother is RhD-. However, in the case of maternal RhD status being positive, invasive prenatal testing may be used to determine the fetal RhD status instead. The two most common invasive methods of extracting fetal DNA are chorionic villus sampling (CVS) and amniocentesis (AMC). These invasive procedures can be conducted on both RhD+ and RhD- mothers. After the invasive procedure, medications that prevent the Rh immunization are usually prescribed to RhD- mothers. This is done to avoid the production of maternal anti-D antibodies which may attack the fetal blood cells should the fetus be Rh incompatible with the mother.

==== Chorionic villus sampling ====
Chorionic villus sampling is usually performed between the 10th and 13th week of pregnancy. It samples chorionic villi, which are tiny projections of placental tissue. The placental tissues are derived from embryonic cells, hence, they contain fetal genetic information that can be used to determine the child's RhD status. There are two types of chorionic villus sampling. Trans-cervical sampling involves inserting a catheter through the cervix into the placenta to obtain villi; an ultrasound is used to guide the catheter to the site of sampling. Trans-abdominal sampling requires the insertion of a needle through the abdomen and uterus to obtain placental tissue. Local anesthesia can be applied to reduce the pain from invasive procedures.

==== Amniocentesis ====
Amniocentesis is another invasive procedure which can be used to collect fetal DNA samples. This procedure is usually done between the 15th and 20th week of pregnancy. The purpose of AMC is to extract a small amount of amniotic fluid as fetal cells may be shed from the fetus and are suspended in the amniotic fluid. Since the fetal genome can be found in these cells, extracting amniotic fluid provides the required fetal genetic material for the genotyping of the RhD gene. Before amniocentesis commences, the doctor will inject local anesthetics to the mother's abdomen. The doctor will then use an ultrasound to locate the fetus in the uterus. Under the guidance of the ultrasound imaging, a long, thin, hollow needle will be inserted through the skin of the abdomen to the uterus of the mother. The needle is used to withdraw a trace amount of amniotic fluid. It is then removed from the maternal body and the extracted amniotic fluid is sent to the laboratory for further testing.

== Genotyping of RhD gene ==
The presence of the RhD gene in an individual's genome is determined by genotyping. Firstly, the body fluid containing an individual's DNA will be extracted. DNA will then be isolated from unwanted impurities. The isolated DNA will then be mixed with various reagents to prepare the polymerase chain reactions (PCR) mixture. The PCR mixture usually contains Taq DNA polymerase, DNA primers, deoxyribonucleotides (dNTP) and buffer solution. The DNA primers are specific for exon 7 and exon 10. Under different circumstances, primers for other regions of the RhD gene, such as intron 4 and exon 5, may also be used. The mixture will be subjected to a series of PCR which is performed by a thermal cycler. By the end of the PCR process, the amount of RhD gene will be amplified if it is present. The product of the PCR will be analyzed by gel electrophoresis. Before gel electrophoresis, DNA reference ladder, a positive control containing DNA with RhD gene, and the PCR product will be loaded onto the wells of the gel. An electric current will be applied and the DNA fragments will migrate to the positive terminal as they are negative in charge. Since DNA fragments have different molecular sizes, the larger they are, the slower they migrate. Utilizing this property, DNA fragments with different molecular masses can be segregated. With the help of gel staining and visualizing devices such as UV trans-illuminators, RhD gene DNA fragments, if present, will be visible as a band with its corresponding molecular mass. Further DNA sequencing can be conducted to confirm that the sequence of product DNA fragments matches that of the RhD gene sequence.

== Clinical applications ==
Rh factor testing is crucial to prevent haemolytic conditions caused by the Rh incompatibility. The consequence of having haemolytic conditions can be dangerous or even lethal as it may lead to multiple complications. Not only does Rh factor testing determine the rhesus status of the individuals, but also indicate the necessity for further medical intervention.

=== Prevention of Rh group incompatibility in blood transfusion ===
When RhD antigens on red blood cells are exposed to an individual with RhD- status, high-frequency of IgG anti-RhD antibodies will be developed in the RhD- individual's body. The antibodies then attack red blood cells with attached RhD antigens and lead to the destruction of these cells. This condition is known as a haemolytic reaction. The destruction of red blood cells releases hemoglobin to the bloodstream. Hemoglobin may be excreted through urine, causing haemoglobinuria. The sudden release of hemoglobin will also pass through the liver and be metabolized into bilirubin, which in high concentrations, accumulates under the skin to cause jaundice. Liberation of blood cell debris into the circulation will also cause disseminated intravascular coagulation.

==== Symptoms of Rh group incompatibility in blood donation ====
Patients receiving incompatible blood transfusion may have pale skin, splenomegaly, hepatomegaly and the yellowing of mouth and eyes. In addition, their urine may appear in dark color and the patients may experience dizziness and confusion. Tachycardia, the increase in heart rate, is also a symptom of the haemolytic disease.

=== Prevention of haemolytic disease of the newborn ===
In the case of pregnancy, when an RhD- mother carries an RhD+ fetus, some of the fetal red blood cells may cross the placenta into the maternal circulation, sensitizing the mother to produce anti-RhD antibodies. Since the mixing of fetal and maternal blood occurs mainly during separation of the placenta during delivery, the first RhD+ pregnancy rarely causes any danger to the fetus as delivery occurs before the synthesis of antibodies by the mother. However, if the mother were to conceive another RhD+ child in the future, the anti-RhD antibodies will cross the placenta to attack and lyse the red cells of the fetus, causing the aforementioned haemolytic reaction in the fetus known as haemolytic disease of the newborn. This disease is usually fatal for the fetus and hence preventive measures are conducted.

==== Symptoms of haemolytic disease of the newborn ====
Symptoms of the disease may vary in each pregnancy. They are usually not noticeable during pregnancy. However, prenatal tests may reveal yellow colouring of amniotic fluid, which is caused by the buildup of bilirubin. Splenomegaly, cardiomegaly and hepatomegaly may occur in the baby. Excessive tissue fluid may accumulate in the stomach, lungs or scalp. These are typically signs of hydrops fetalis.

After birth, the symptoms of the child are similar to that of incompatible blood transfusion in adults. The baby may have pale skin due to anaemia. The yellowing of the umbilical cord, skin and eyes, also known as jaundice, may arise within 24 to 36 hours of birth. Signs of hydrops fetalis such as the enlargement of spleen, heart and liver, along with severe edema, will continue after birth.

=== Medical intervention ===
Normally, no extra medical intervention is required when maternal Rh status is RhD+, nor RhD- mothers going through first pregnancy. However, in the case of a sensitized RhD- mother (previously conceived an RhD+ child) and the fetus being Rh+, medication such as an anti-D immunoglobulin, called RhoGAM, will be given to the RhD- mother. Injecting RhD- mother with RhoGAM has been proven effective in avoiding the sensitisation of RhD+ antigen, even though the mechanism of how this medication works remains obscure.

This injection is given to the RhD- mother during the second trimester when there is incompatibility between her and the father. Another injection is given a couple days after delivery if the baby is found to be RhD+. These injections may also be given to RhD- mothers after a miscarriage/abortion, after injury to the abdomen, or after the prenatal tests mentioned before of amniocentesis and chorionic villus sampling (cite1). Anti-D immunoglobulin injection is also offered to RhD- individuals who have been mistakenly transfused with RhD+ blood.
