= Abortion in Cambodia =

Abortion in Cambodia is legal upon request within the first twelve weeks of pregnancy.

After twelve weeks, abortions are only legal in Cambodia when they will save the woman's life or preserve her health, the pregnancy is a result of rape, or the child may be born with an incurable disease. In any of these instances, at least two medical personnel must approve the abortion.

As of 2023, Medabon (a combination therapy containing two medicines called mifepristone and misoprosto) is the only available product for inducing medical abortion in Cambodia. Registered in Cambodia in 2010, it is available at pharmacies and limited number of clinical practices.

The Cambodia Demographic and Health Survey 2014 reported that 12% of women have had at least one abortion in their lifetime. 60% of abortions are surgical, while 40% used medications. Of the medical abortions, 61% occurred under the care of a healthcare provider and the remainder reported no assistance or no involvement of a provider.

One study following 2,083 Cambodian women found that use of over-the-counter abortion medication was as effective and safe as abortion medication administered in a clinical setting. Despite this, there are still many barriers to accessing abortion in Cambodia, increasing stigma and driving individuals towards less safe abortions.

== Abortion law in Cambodia (1997) ==
Abortion is legal in Cambodia up to twelve weeks of pregnancy under the law of 1997. If the woman seeks an abortion after 12 weeks of pregnancy, it is only allowed under certain conditions:

a) if there are chances that the pregnancy/fetus is not developing normally or continuation of the pregnancy poses a threat to the woman's life

b) if the fetus has developed a disease that cannot be cured

c) if the unintended pregnancy is the result of rape

In the above stances, "either 2 or 3" doctors must approve these cases for the abortion to take place. It is mandatory to have the consent or permission from the woman seeking an abortion, for abortion. The abortion can only be carried out by "medical doctors, medical practitioners or midwives" who are authorized from the Ministry of Public Health.

== Abortion stigma in Cambodia ==
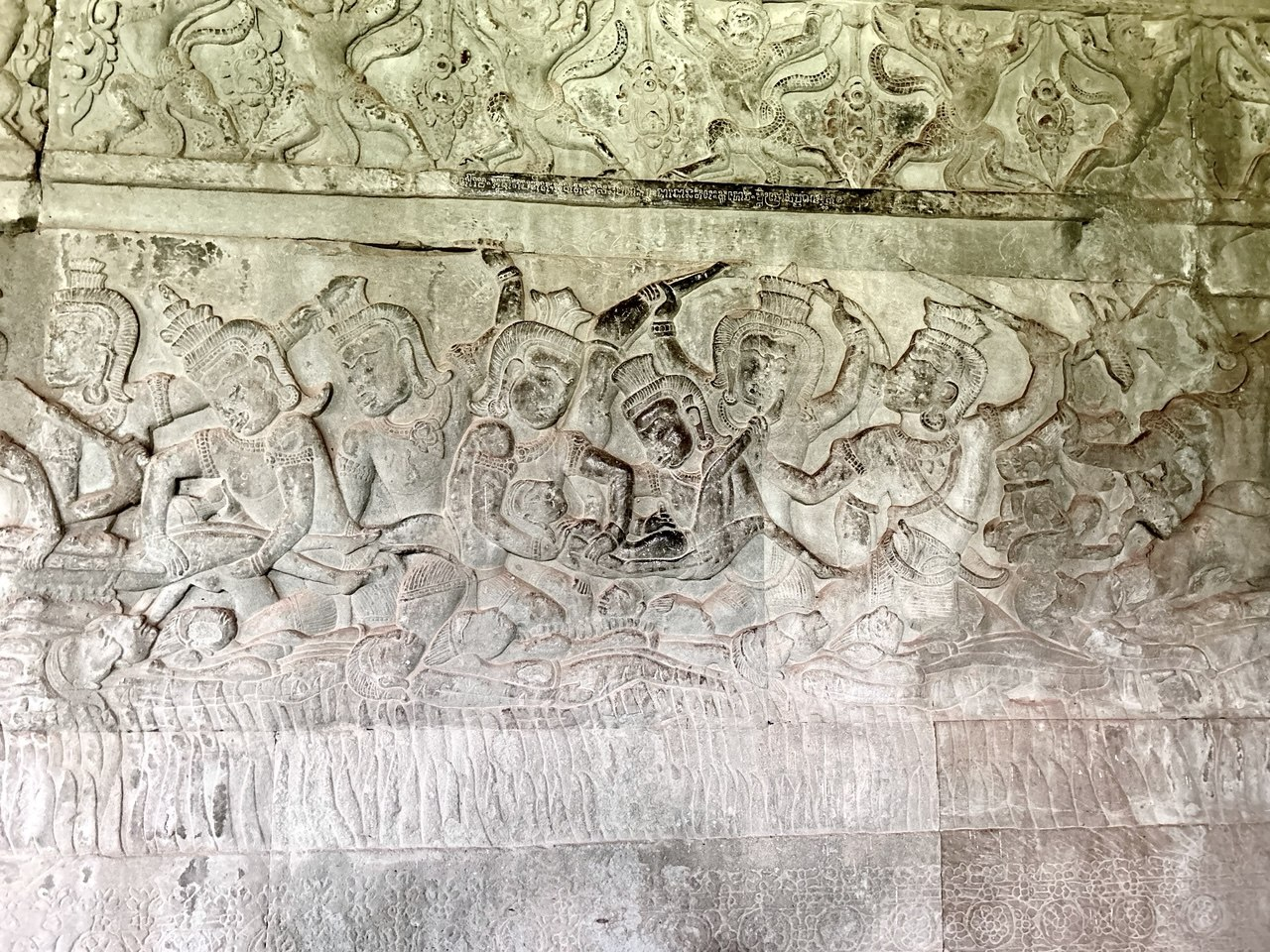
Angkor Wat bas-relief of deep massage abortion

Though abortion is legal in Cambodia, an unmarried woman seeking an abortion is looked down upon. Women are expected not to indulge in sex before marriage and getting pregnant before marriage is frowned upon. Dr Ouk Vong Vathiny, executive director of Reproductive Health Association of Cambodia, told Phenompenhpost, "Many women don't want to tell anyone because as Buddhists, the community considers it a sin."

According to another report by the Guttmacher Institute, abortion, despite being legal in the county, is not widely available because of the shame and stigma attached to it, thus forcing women to opt for alternative unsafe routes like "deep massage abortion"—a traditional practice. Abortion has a history in Cambodia and one of the traditional methods of deep massage abortion, where pressure is applied to a pregnant woman's stomach to abort the fetus, can be seen in one of the stone carvings in the 12th century temple of Angkor Wat in Cambodia. The next carving shows that the same woman and the people who helped her in terminating the pregnancy by massage of abdomen, are condemned to "underworld".

The bas-relief sculptures in Angkor Wat, Cambodia are the first ever known of an abortion in progress. Experts describe the deep massage abortion methods as high risk as it causes hemorrhage and severe bleeding to the woman who is seeking an abortion by this method.
