= Magaly Antonia Pineda Tejada =

Dominican feminist and sociologist

Magaly Antonia Pineda Tejada (March 21, 1943 – March 29, 2016), known as the mother of feminism in the Dominican Republic, was a Dominican sociologist, teacher, researcher, and activist. She was considered one of the most important defenders of human rights, particularly women's rights, in her country. As a leftist activist, she participated in the 14th of June Revolutionary Movement and the Dominican Popular Movement.

== Early life ==
Magaly Antonia Pineda Tejada was born in Santo Domingo, then Ciudad Trujillo, in 1943, to a working-class family. Her father, Pedro (Chichi) Pineda, drove a communal taxi known as a carro público, and her mother, Ana Leonor Tejada, was a shopkeeper. She had two sisters, Milagros and Maritza Pineda.

As a child, she moved with her family to Puerto Rico. The move was prompted by pressure exerted on her family by the Trujillo regime because of their relationship with her uncle Manuel Tejada Florentino, a doctor involved in the clandestine resistance to the dictatorship.

She studied sociology at the University of Puerto Rico, where she led the Puerto Rico Pro-Independence University Federation.

After Trujillo was overthrown in 1961, Pineda was able to return to the Dominican Republic, where she joined the 14th of June Revolutionary Movement. She also co-founded the Federation of Dominican Women, which fought against the 1965 U.S. military intervention in the country. In 1965 she married Rafael "Fafa" Taveras, a leading member of the Modern Revolutionary Party and the 14th of June Movement, with whom she had three children: Syra Leonor, Rafael, and Marcelle Victoria.

== Feminist activism ==
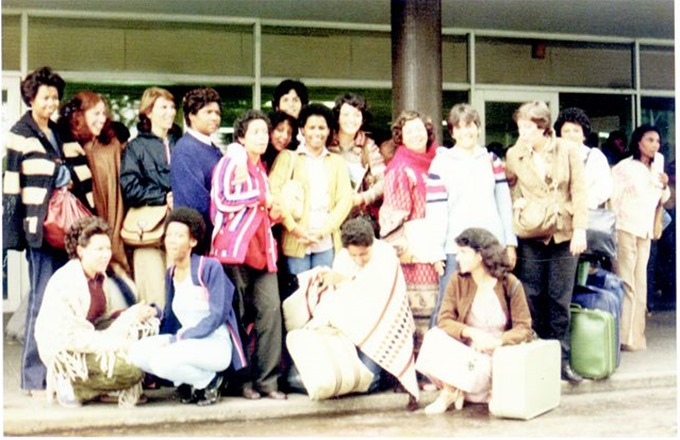
Magaly Pineda, center-right in a pink scarf, attends the first Feminist Encounter of Latin America and the Caribbean in 1981.

"The April Revolution defined my life. Feminism changed my life."

— Magaly Pineda, interview with UN Women

Pineda was one of the most important leaders of the gender equality movement in the Dominican Republic, particularly in the 1970s and '80s.

She founded various feminist networks in the region, fighting for reforms that would shape gender politics in her country. In 1977, Pineda joined the Universidad Autónoma de Santo Domingo as a professor, but she sought out a more radical forum for feminist research. In 1980, she created the Research Center for Women's Action (CIPAF), a nonprofit NGO in the Dominican Republic and the Caribbean whose mission is promoting the role of women in democracy and conducting research on topics like sexual violence. She also founded Quehaceres, the longest-running feminist magazine in the country.

Pineda never backed down from a fight, even on issues that remain controversial in the Dominican Republic, including abortion access and LGBTQ rights.

Pineda also promoted labor rights, working to help both urban and rural female workers as well as child domestic workers. She was a member of an advisory board to the Dominican government on social policy, as well as a founding member of the Regional Initiative for Social Responsibility and Dignified Work (IRSTD).

== Death and recognition ==
Her work in the field of education, which focused on sexism and discrimination in schools, won her an Equality and Gender Mainstreaming-Technology (GEM-TECH) award in 2014.

Pineda suffered from multiple myeloma for 13 years. She died on 29 March 2016, at the age of 73.

The feminist organization Tertulia Feminista Magaly Pineda was created in her honor.
