= Abortion in Mozambique =

In Mozambique, abortion is legal on request up to a gestational age of 12 weeks. This gestational limit is increased to 16 weeks or 24 weeks in exceptional cases. Requirements for legal abortions include taking place at authorized facilities and, for minors, parental consent. Legal abortion is mostly performed by nurses, and abortion pills are available over-the-counter. However, illegal abortion is common due to inability to access legal abortion, privacy concerns, delays in seeking treatment, and unfamiliarity with the law. Abortions are most common among women who are upper-class or young. Unsafe abortion contributes to the country's high maternal mortality rate. Abortion is subject to stigma and religious opposition in the country.

Mozambique inherited Portugal's abortion law in 1886, banning abortion, though a legal principle permitted abortions for pregnancies that threatened life or health. The Ministry of Health started using a broad interpretation of this law in 1981, when it began making agreements with hospitals permitting them to perform abortions at their discretion. Abortions became more available after the privatization of healthcare in the late 1980s, although they were prohibitively expensive until fees were abolished in 2007. Abortion was legalized by a revision of the penal code signed by President Armando Guebuza in 2014, receiving support from public health activists and opposition from the Catholic Church. Due to uncertainty about the law, abortion services declined after its passage. Following the publication of abortion guidelines in 2017, services improved. A 2019 revision to the penal code fully removed punishments for legal abortions.

== Legislation ==
In Mozambique, legal abortion on request is available up to a gestational age of 12 weeks. The gestational limit is increased to 16 weeks in cases of pregnancy from rape or incest, or to 24 weeks for pregnancies that risk the physical or mental health of the mother or birth defects. No gestational limit is specified for life-threatening pregnancies, although the Ministry of Health's guidelines define abortion as occurring before 28 weeks of pregnancy. The law also provides for the approval of abortions on a case-by-case basis and recommends abortions in cases of failure of birth control, sexual violence, chronic illness, HIV/AIDS, or unwanted pregnancy of a minor.

Abortions must be performed at authorized facilities. Abortions for minors (below age 16) or others who lack legal capacity require the approval of a parent or guardian. Requirements for legal abortions include a written request and examinations to assess gestational age and the existence of contraindications for the procedure. Medical abortion is allowed to be performed without direct medical supervision, and pharmacies may sell abortion drugs over-the-counter. Under Article 166 of the penal code of Mozambique, receiving or assisting in an illegal abortion is punishable by a prison sentence of up to two years, while providing an illegal abortion is punishable by up to one year, which is increased to three months to two years in cases of forced abortion.

== History ==
=== Abortion ban (1886–1981) ===
During the colonial era, Mozambique inherited Portugal's abortion law. Abortion was banned by Article 358 of the 1886 Penal Code of Mozambique, a law taken from the 1852 Penal Code of Portugal, which was influenced by French Penal Code of 1810 as well as the Spanish law system. The law did not state any exceptions, but a legal principle permitted abortions for pregnancies that threatened life or health, under the doctrine of double effect. Abortions in other cases were punishable by a prison sentence of 2 to 8 years, with weaker sentences for abortions done to preserve honor. Mozambique retained Portugal's penal code after independence, despite the ruling party, FRELIMO, supporting maternal health. Abortion patients were often arrested immediately after seeking post-abortion care. FRELIMO's socialist government also promoted secularism, weakening the influence of the Catholic Church's opposition to abortion, but the abortion ban was unchanged in part due to religious interests.

=== Quasi-legal abortion (1981–2014) ===
In 1981, the Ministry of Health made abortion quasi-legal through a broad interpretation of risk to life or health. This policy was enacted in response to the country's high rates of fatal abortion and of sexual violence, as well as the risk of health issues during pregnancy and a low rate of birth control. This began when Minister of Health Pascoal Macumbi, who also worked as an obstetrician-gynecologist Maputo Central Hospital, made an agreement with the hospital, leading to later agreements with other central and provincial hospitals. (Note: Although many sources describe the 1981 policy as a ministerial decree, it was actually a series of agreements with individual hospitals.) Authorized hospitals could perform abortions up to a 12-week gestational limit, which the hospitals would allow on a case-by-case basis, and the procedure could be performed by physicians or other medical professionals. Grounds on which hospitals could authorize abortion were very broad; these included failure of birth control. However, abortions on this ground required the consent of the pregnant woman's partner. Abortions for minors required parental approval, though this was not enforced in all hospitals. Procedures initially required a written request from the patient or a guardian of the patient.

Healthcare in Mozambique was privatized in the late 1980s, and the availability of abortion on request increased as it was profitable. The first government agenda to address abortion was the 1991 "Strategies for Safe Motherhood" seminar, though it did not call for decriminalization. By 1997, hospitals interpreted the abortion policy so broadly that anyone desiring an abortion was considered to have a health risk due to the risks of unsafe abortion. Hospitals enacted their own requirements for abortions, including written requests, photo ID of the pregnant woman or partner, or a fee.

Abortions at approved hospitals were more expensive than unsafe abortions, and many Mozambicans could not afford them. Maputo Central Hospital performed about 1,200 abortions in 1994, around which time an abortion at the hospital cost US$16. In 2007, when fees were abolished, the cost ranged up to US$100, with an average of US$24. In 2004, authorized hospitals performed 3,000 abortions, most of which were performed by maternal-child health nurses using misoprostol followed by manual vacuum aspiration. That year, 37% of abortion providers used the non-recommended dilation and curettage method. According to human rights scholar Charles Ngwena in 2011, the Ministry of Health's policy had been "instrumental" but "only ... partially successful in guaranteeing Mozambican women with accessible abortion services" as the formal abortion ban meant the policy could be challenged in courts and the availability of abortion was limited by the small number of authorized hospitals and other barriers.

=== Legal abortion (2014–present) ===
The Women and Law in Southern Africa Mozambique Research Project was one of the first women's rights groups to support abortion, with a 1997 report by the organization advocating for women's freedom of choice. The international reproductive rights group Pathfinder International began advocating for abortion law reform in Mozambique in 2011. Advocates for legal abortion in Mozambique based their arguments on public health rather than women's rights, saying that legal abortion would save money for the public health system and reduce maternal mortality.

In July 2014, the Assembly of the Republic introduced a bill legalizing abortion up to twelve weeks, with higher limits in certain cases. Supporters of the law argued that abortions were a major cause of the country's maternal mortality rate, which was one of the highest in the world. The new law was included in the new penal code enacted by Law No. 35/2014. It was signed in December 2014 by President Armando Guebuza. This made Mozambique's abortion law one of the most permissive in Africa, being the fourth country on the continent to allow abortion on request. It received little attention from the country's media. The Catholic Church opposed legalizing abortion, with the Episcopal Conference of Mozambique stating, "[We empathize] with those wanting to reduce the maternal mortality rate and promote women's rights. Despite that, we affirm that abortion is not the solution for these situations."

The 2014 law replaced the 1981 policy, and abortions performed under the previous rules stopped. However, the new law did not specify which abortion providers and methods were legal, and uncertainty among providers meant it was not immediately implemented. This caused the availability of safe abortion to decrease before safe abortion guidelines were published. After the publication of these guidelines in September 2017, as well as the Ministry of Health's Decree No. 60/2017, abortion services improved in early 2018. Abortion complications decreased in following years, except in 2020, the year of the COVID-19 pandemic. The 2017 guidelines said facilities would provide abortion for free, and Maputo Central Hospital issued a memo that it would do so in August 2018.

Beginning in 2016, the Swedish Embassy provided funding for family planning and abortion care in Nampula and Zambezia Provinces. The following year, Mozambique received a grant from the governments of Canada and Norway to improve family planning and abortion care. Legal abortion was introduced to Nampula in 2017 and Tete Province in 2019, being available in six of the province's fifteen districts. Sexual education programs in schools and the media informed the public about legal abortion. The Mozambican Associations of Obstetricians and Gynecologists led discussions with stakeholders and workshops on implementing legal abortion, as well as an information campaign that involved social media posts and a song featuring well-known artists. Organizations providing information about the new law—such as AMODEFA, the country's affiliate of Planned Parenthood—had their funds limited after the United States's enactment of the Mexico City policy in 2017, which banned federal funding for organizations that promote abortion.

The penal code was revised by Law No. 24/2019, passed in December 2019, which included an amendment to Article 168 eliminating punishments for abortions that follow the legal grounds. Officials reported that the law reform led to a decrease in unsafe abortion, from 2,000 cases in the first half of 2021 to 1,800 in the first half of 2022. A 2024 update to the abortion guidelines brought them in line with the World Health Organization's 2022 recommendations. United States officials reported in January 2025 that four nurses in Mozambique had performed abortions after their organizations received funding from the country through its President's Emergency Plan for AIDS Relief program; this was the first known violation of the program's rule against funding abortions. US Senator Jim Risch, a member of the Republican Party, alleged that Democratic president Joe Biden and the Centers for Disease Control had enabled these abortions. Mozambique's government refunded US$4,100 to the United States.

== Prevalence ==
In 2015–2019, the estimated annual incidence of abortions in Mozambique was 277,000, equating to 47% of unintended pregnancies or 17% of all pregnancies. The abortion rate had increased by 51% since 1990–1994, during which time the unintended pregnancy rate had been stagnant. The country's 2011 Demographic and Health Survey (DHS) found that 9.8% of women have had abortions. Unsafe abortion is a major factor in the country's high maternal mortality rate. Abortions caused 6.7% of maternal mortality in 2013, down from 16–18% in 1995. In 2008, abortion deaths comprised between 11% and 18% of maternal deaths recorded in hospitals. At Maputo General Hospital in 1997, 3% of patients seeking treatment for unsafe abortions died.

Legal abortions are primarily available in district hospitals rather than those in rural areas. Nurses commonly receive abortion training. Medication abortion combination packs of misoprostol and mifepristone are available at most pharmacies in Maputo. Many women seek illegal abortions as they believe legal providers are not confidential, and many cannot afford safe abortion. Others cannot receive abortions as their pregnancies are past the gestational limit of twelve weeks. A 2005–2006 study in Maputo found that requests for abortion after twelve weeks are more common among women who are younger, lower-class, less educated, or unemployed. Abortion is one of the most frequently sought procedures for folk healers in the country. Folk healers perform abortions by inserting cassava sticks into the vagina. Other illegal abortions commonly use surgical methods or abortifacient plants.

The proportion of women who have ever had abortions is highest among those who are upper-class, educated, or Christian (rather than Muslim), according to the 2011 DHS. In the clinic of the Mozambican Association for Development of the family, young women comprised 43% of abortion patients between 2010 and 2016. In 2017, 10.6% of women in Maputo and 4.5% in Quelimane reported having had abortions. According to a paper published in BMC Women's Health, the disparity between these two cities may be due to the family structure being patrilineal in Maputo and matrilineal in Quelimane. Many young people view abortions as a way to avoid societal repercussions such as the obligation to get married after pregnancy.

A 2018 study found that abortions do not follow the legal requirements as people are unfamiliar with the law. In 2017, 43.1% of women in Maputo and Quelimane believed that abortion is illegal, while another 28.1% were unsure, with Maputo having higher knowledge of the law. Knowledge of the law was higher among women who were younger.

Abortion is stigmatized in Mozambique, and religious opposition to abortion is common. Abortions are euphemistically referred to by saying "the pot cracked", referring to the uterus. In Mozambican culture, fetuses are not considered humans until nine months of pregnancy, so they are not buried with adults or children. In Gondola District, funerals for aborted fetuses are held only by menopausal women, with the belief that it will restore the fertility of the woman who had an abortion. In Chewa culture, abortions (and miscarriages) are believed to contribute to temperature-based illnesses known as mgosyo, including one called ntaka, which is caused when someone who has lost a fetus has put salt on food.

== See also ==
- Human rights in Mozambique
- Maputo Protocol – treaty signed in Mozambique that addresses abortion
