= Abortion in Chile =

Overview of the legality and prevalence of abortions in Chile

Abortion in Chile is legal in the following cases: when the mother's life is at risk, when the fetus will not survive the pregnancy, and during the first 12 weeks of pregnancy (14 weeks, if the woman is under 14 years old) in the case of rape. Between 1989 and 2017, Chile had one of the most restrictive abortion policies in the world, criminalizing its practice without exception.

The bill permitting abortion was approved by the National Congress in August 2017, and became law a month later after surviving a constitutional challenge brought by the conservative opposition. Medical coverage in the public and private sector became available on 29 January 2018.

== Legal background ==
"The Law of God says 'Thou shalt not kill.' Nothing can be more unnatural than punishing with death the defenseless, but person, who is yet to be born. Aborting is killing, even if the corpse is very small."

— Admiral José Toribio Merino in 1989.

Therapeutic abortion, which was permitted by the Health Code in 1931, was abolished by the military dictatorship on 15 September 1989, arguing that due to advances in medicine it was "no longer justifiable". Before the ban, any woman whose life was in danger could ask to get an abortion if she had the approval of two doctors.

Current laws against abortion are codified in the Penal Code articles 342 to 345 under the title "Crimes and Offences against Family Order, Public Morality and Sexual Integrity". The Penal Code punishes illegal abortions with up to five years in jail for the person performing it, and with up to ten years if violence is used against the pregnant woman. The pregnant woman may get up to five years if she consents to an illegal abortion or performs it on herself. A medical doctor practicing an illegal abortion may get up to 15 years. The country's constitution in article 19-1 states that "the law protects the life of those about to be born." A two-thirds majority of each chamber of the Chilean Congress is required to amend it.

Since 1990, 15 abortion-related bills have been submitted by legislators to Congress for discussion, 12 in the Chamber of Deputies and three in the Senate. About half called to either increase existing penalties or to create legal barriers to make it more difficult for abortion to be legalized. Two other bills suggested erecting monuments to the "innocent victims of abortion". Four bills have requested that abortion be allowed when the mother's life is at risk and one in the case of rape. Nine are currently in review and one has been rejected. Five others have been archived, which means they have not been discussed for two years. Two identical bills requesting the reestablishment of therapeutic abortion as it was before 1989 are currently in review in the Chamber's Medical Commission, the first submitted on January 23, 2003, and the latest on March 19, 2009.

In November 2013, during the administration of conservative President Sebastián Piñera, a law was published declaring March 25 as the "day of those about to be born and of adoption".

On 31 January 2015, President Michelle Bachelet sent a draft bill to Congress to decriminalize abortion in the following cases: when the mother's life is at risk, when the fetus will not survive the pregnancy, and in the case of rape during the first 12 weeks of pregnancy (18 weeks, if the woman is under 14 years old). On 2 August 2017, the Congress approved the bill, lowering the number of weeks to 14 from 18, in the case a girl under 14 is raped. A request by the opposition to declare the law unconstitutional was rejected by the country's Constitutional Court in a 6–4 decision on 21 August 2017. The ruling allowed health facilities to refuse to provide abortions by becoming "conscientious objectors", although the bill, as approved by Congress, granted this right only to individuals. The law was promulgated by President Bachelet on 14 September 2017, and was published in the country's official gazette on 23 September 2017. Medical coverage in the public and private sector became available on 29 January 2018. A protocol for "conscientious objectors" was published by the Health Ministry on 27 January 2018. Such protocol was modified by the incoming administration of Sebastián Piñera on 23 March 2018, lifting the prohibition on private health institutions receiving state funds from invoking conscientious objection. In May 2018, the Office of the Comptroller General ruled both protocols illegal. In October 2018, the government published an amended protocol, restoring the prohibition on private health institutions receiving state funds from invoking conscientious objection. That section of the protocol was, however, ruled unconstitutional by the Constitutional Court in December 2018, after a request by a group of lawmakers supporting the sitting administration.

== Women's health ==
An amendment made by the Chilean government to section 119 of the Health Code in 1989 stated that there could be no actions taken that would induce an abortion. This amendment was made due to the belief that with medical advances in maternal care, abortion was no longer seen as a necessary means of saving a woman's life.

Concern over high rates of abortion and high maternal mortality rates led the Chilean government to launch a publicly funded family planning program in 1964. Deaths due to illegal abortions dropped from 118 to 24 per 100,000 live births between 1964 and 1979.

There was also a statistically significant decrease in maternal deaths due to abortion from 1990 to 2000. Experts attribute the decline in hospitalizations due to abortion during this period to the increased use of sterilization and antibiotics by illegal abortion providers, the increased availability of the abortifacient drug misoprostol, and the increased use of contraception. In terms of accessibility, in 2002 it was noted that most of the family planning services were offered to married women.

A 2015 study by the Chilean epidemiologist Elard Koch has shown that the decreasing trend in maternal deaths due to abortion has continued through 2009. These results challenge the common notion that less permissive abortion laws lead to greater mortality associated with abortion. Koch states that the increases in women's education and in community support programs for women with unplanned pregnancies have contributed to the reduction of induced abortions and maternal deaths in Chile.

In the period 2000 to 2004, abortion was the third leading cause of maternal mortality in the country, accounting for 12% of all maternal deaths. While there are no accurate statistics, it is estimated that between 2000 and 2002 there were between 132,000 and 160,000 abortions in the country.

A 1997 study found that the majority of eighty women prosecuted in Santiago for having an abortion were young, single mothers, and that many were domestic workers who had moved to the city from rural areas. It also found most of the women were reported to authorities by the hospital at which they sought treatment for their complications, and had no legal representation, or were defended by inexperienced law students.

== Public opinion ==
A July 2006 MORI survey found that 26% of Chileans believed that abortion is "justified", up from 18% in 1990.

A July 2008 all-female nationwide face-to-face poll by NGO Corporación Humanas found that 79.2% of Chilean women were in favor of decriminalizing abortion when the life of the pregnant woman is at risk; 67.9% said it was urgent to legislate on the matter. According to the study, 74.0% of women believed abortion should be permitted in cases of rape, 70.1% in instances of fetal abnormality and 24% in all cases a woman decided it was appropriate.

A March 2009 nationwide telephone poll published by La Tercera newspaper found 67% were against abortion, 19% in favor and 11% in favor only in extreme cases. Regarding abortion when the life of the pregnant woman is at risk, 48% were in favor, 3% only in extreme cases and 47% were against. In cases where the baby would be born with a defect or disease that would most likely cause the baby's death, 51% were against permitting an abortion, 45% were in favor and 2% only in extreme cases. 83% were against performing an abortion on an underage girl who had unprotected sex, while 14% were in favor. 57% were in favor of abortion in the case of rape, with 39% against it.

An October 2009 opinion poll published by Universidad Diego Portales and covering 85% of urban areas of Chile found that a majority were against abortion when the pregnant woman or couple did not have the economic means to raise a baby (80%), when the pregnant woman or couple did not want to have a baby (68%), and when the fetus had a "serious defect" (51%). On the other hand, a majority were in favor of abortion when the pregnant woman's health is at risk (63%) and in cases of rape (64%).

A January 2017 opinion poll conducted by CADEM found that 57% wanted abortion to be allowed in only a few cases, while 19% wanted abortion illegal in all cases and 22% wanted it legal in all cases. A majority were in favor of abortion when the woman's health is at risk (76%), when the fetus does not have a high probability of survival (72%), and when a woman is pregnant as a result of rape (71%), while only a minority supported abortion in cases of a fetus having a physical disability (36%) and in cases of a mother not being able to afford a child (20%).

In August 2021, a Cadem survey showed that 46% of Chileans agree with abortion within 14 weeks, 52% disapprove of the measure and another 2% did not know or did not respond.

== International reaction ==
In November 2004, the United Nations (UN) committee monitoring compliance with the International Covenant on Economic, Social and Cultural Rights (CESCR) ruled that Chile should allow abortion in cases of rape and incest. In 2007, the United Nations Human Rights Council expressed concern over the country's "improperly restrictive" legislation on abortion, especially in cases where the life of the mother is at risk. The UN's High Commissioner for Human Rights also expressed concern over the country's "excessively restrictive abortion laws" in May 2009.

== Move towards liberalisation of the law ==
On 19 July 2017, the Senate of Chile approved legislation permitting abortion under limited circumstances (if the pregnancy endangers the life of the woman, if the fetus is not viable, if the pregnancy resulted from rape) with 22 votes in favor and 13 against. On 3 August, the Chamber of Deputies of Chile approved the legislation with 70 votes in favor, 45 votes against and 1 abstention. On 21 August 2017, Chile's Constitutional Court accepted the constitutionality of the measure with a 6–4 vote. President Michelle Bachelet, who had already signed the draft bill version of the law in 2015 before it was passed in August 2017, praised the court's decision to make the bill a law. According to polls, 70% of Chileans approve of such a law.

== See also ==
- Abortion debate
- Abortion in El Salvador
- Abortion in Nicaragua
