= Abortion in El Salvador =

Abortion is illegal in El Salvador. The law formerly permitted an abortion to be performed under some limited circumstances, but in 1998 all exceptions were removed when a new abortion law went into effect.

== History of Salvadoran abortion law ==
El Salvador's 1956 Penal Code contained no explicit exception to its prohibition of abortion, although, under accepted principles of criminal law, one could be justified if necessary to preserve the life of the pregnant woman. In response to the fact that the practice of illegal abortion was common, and was a major contributor to the rate of maternal mortality, the Salvadoran government chose to expand the cases in which abortion was permitted.

Under the new Penal Code of 1973, an abortion could be legally allowed under three major conditions: if the pregnant woman's life was endangered and abortion was the only means to preserve it, if her pregnancy had resulted from rape or statutory rape, or if a serious congenital disorder was detected in the fetus. An abortion caused on part of the woman's negligence was exempted from prosecution, and the government also provided reduced penalties for a woman of good standing if she had consented to an illegal abortion, or self-induced one, in the interest of protecting her reputation.

== Reform process and current law ==
Proposals to eliminate the exceptions to the general prohibition against abortion started to come before the country's Legislative Assembly in 1992. One bill would have resulted in the investigation of medical clinics suspected of providing abortion; as a result of a 1993 study, overseen by a politician affiliated with the Christian Democratic Party, several health care workers were arrested. Another proposal in 1993, which was supported by the Archbishop of San Salvador and the "Say Yes to Life Foundation" (an anti-abortion group), would have made December 28, a traditional Roman Catholic feast day known as the Day of the Innocents, the "Day of the Unborn".

In 1997, the Nationalist Republican Alliance (ARENA) submitted a draft bill, designed to amend the Penal Code to withdraw all grounds under which abortion was then permitted. On April 25, 1997, the Legislative Assembly voted 61 out of 84 to approve this modification to the Code.

On April 20, 1998, the new Penal Code was enacted, removing the exceptions that had been instituted in 1973, including the provision for the pregnant woman's life. Under this Code, a person who performs an abortion with the woman's consent, or a woman who self-induces or consents to someone else inducing her abortion, can be imprisoned for two to eight years. A person who performs an abortion to which the woman has not consented can be sentenced to four to ten years in jail; if the person is a physician, pharmacist, or other health care worker, he or she is instead subject to between six and twelve years.

El Salvador also amended its Constitution in January 1999 to recognize human life from the moment of conception.

== Objections to the law ==
The organizations IPAS, MADRE, and Women's Link Worldwide submitted a report to the United Nations Human Rights Committee in which they contended that the El Salvadoran law against abortion violates several treaties that El Salvador has ratified: the International Covenant on Civil and Political Rights (ICCPR); the International Covenant on Economic, Social and Cultural Rights (ICESCR); the International Convention on the Elimination of All Forms of Racial Discrimination (CERD); the Convention on the Rights of the Child (CRC); and the Convention on the Elimination of All Forms of Discrimination against Women (CEDAW).

They point out that "The Constitution of El Salvador protects every person's right to life, liberty, security of person, and social justice. Furthermore it establishes that all persons are equal before the law and there can be no restrictions based on race, gender or religion. El Salvador's criminal anti-abortion legislation allegedly violates all of these constitutional and human rights established in the previously mentioned international conventions."

In October 2016, then-President of the Legislative Assembly of El Salvador Lorena Peña introduced a bill calling for the Legislative Assembly of El Salvador to end the country's absolute ban on abortion and decriminalize abortion under certain circumstances.

== Continued practice of abortion in El Salvador ==
Unsafe abortion is a serious public health problem and the second direct cause of maternal mortality in El Salvador. In 1994, the third-most-prevalent cause of mortality among adolescent girls was pregnancy and postpartum complications. Some of the girls arrested for trying to have abortions are as young as ten. It's a drain on resources in a country where health care expenditures in 1997 were $24 per person per year.

The criminalization of abortion has extremely serious consequences for women's lives and health: abortions performed under dangerous conditions; high mortality and morbidity rates; and a lack of reliable studies that could help health services provide better care to their clients, including women who have had abortions in unsafe conditions. This situation is further exacerbated by the persecution of women by the Salvadoran justice and health systems. In some cases, therapeutic abortions are performed by physicians in medical settings, and justified as other procedures, e.g. a laparotomy (abdominal incision) rather than an abortion.

=== Abortion methods in El Salvador ===
Doctors in El Salvador report that women seeking abortions use a wide variety of methods: clothes hangers, metal rods, high doses of contraceptives, fertilizers, gastritis remedies, soapy water, and caustic fluids (such as battery acid). The most common methods are pills, such as Cytotec and potassium permanganate (inserted vaginally); catheters to inject soapy water or caustic liquids; rods of any type of material to penetrate the uterus; injections of unknown solutions; or a combination of abortion methods, such as pills, a catheter, and an injection or pills and a metal rod.

Using pills, catheters, injections and rods can kill a woman or injure her permanently. In addition to having only dangerous methods at their disposal, the women being tried for abortion were forced to self-induce abortions in their homes, in unsanitary conditions or in clandestine clinics that could not guarantee adequate procedures. If complications arise due to the conditions in which the abortion was practiced, they are then at risk of being reported by hospital staff who treat the complications. All of this highlights the risk to life, health, security of person and liberty that terminating an unwanted pregnancy represents for young, low-income women in El Salvador.

=== Prosecutions ===
A report in 2001 revealed that, after the new Penal Code went into effect in 1998, 69 cases of illegal abortions had been prosecuted. In 23 of those cases, the women involved had been turned over to the authorities by health care workers when they arrived at the hospital seeking treatment after an unsafe abortion. Most abortions had been self-induced, through the use of clothes hangers, or by the ingestion of harmful amounts of hormonal contraception pills, antacids, or misoprostol pills.

According to Amnesty International, low-income women who have a miscarriage or a stillbirth are often prosecuted. Often they are reported by medical personnel to the police and subsequently arrested in the hospital. They are wrongly accused of abortion or homicide and sentenced up to 40 years in prison. Currently, there are 17 women in prison for pregnancy related complications who have not had due process while being prosecuted.

In an article published in the April 9, 2006, edition of the New York Times Magazine, writer Jack Hitt explored the effect of 1998 Penal Code. The article was later disputed when it was revealed that a woman mentioned as having been sentenced to 30 years in prison for an abortion, Carmen Climaco, had been jailed for the homicide of what was ruled to have been a full-term infant. In fact, Karina del Carmen Herrera Climaco had given birth at home and then began to bleed heavily. (The pregnancy was almost certainly unintentional, as it occurred after a tubal ligation.) Her mother called the police to take her to the hospital. While she was in the hospital, police searched her home and found a lifeless infant. Medical examination failed to determine if the infant was born alive or dead, nor a cause of death. Nevertheless, a sentence of aggravated homicide was passed, separating her from her three children. Almost eight years later, thanks to the efforts of a group of activists and national and international attorneys, Karina's sentence was reviewed. It was annulled and she was released. She has not been compensated for her eight years of incarceration.

Another 30-year sentence was passed out for an apparent miscarriage, in August 2008, by the Tribunal of San Francisco Gotera in the department of Morazan. María Edis Hernández Méndez de Castro, 30, was a single mother with four children when she found out she was pregnant. Maria told her family that she was pregnant, even though she did not know how far along the pregnancy was. During the pregnancy, Maria felt pain and went to the bathroom in her home at which time she suffered labor complications and passed out. She regained consciousness in the National Hospital of San Francisco. The doctor that treated Maria reported her to the police on suspicion of having an abortion. She was convicted of aggravated homicide and sentenced to thirty years in prison. Two more cases of women sentenced to lengthy prison terms for what might have been abortions or miscarriages are detailed in the same report.

=== Medical harm ===
The lack of contraceptive information and the ban on abortion put women's lives at risk, particularly when they are young. One-third of the women giving birth are 19 or younger, and a handful are 10 – 14 years old.

== Case of "Beatriz" ==
In 2013, a case arose of a pregnant 22-year-old woman, identified as "Beatriz", who, due to lupus aggravated by the loss of kidney function, was told by doctors that she would likely die if she gave birth and that the child, due to its anencephaly, would likely have only a few hours of life. Her doctors requested permission from the government to perform an abortion because the fetus was nonviable and Beatriz was likely to die. When the case came before the Supreme Court, the court denied Beatriz's request.

She was given permission to have an early caesarean section, the same procedure that would have been used had the court ruled in her favor. Legally, this was not an abortion because the fetus was incubated and given fluids. The child died five hours after the procedure. Beatriz was able to recover and leave the hospital. The case was identified by pro-abortion activists as evidence of a lack of progress towards the goals of the 1994 International Conference on Population and Development, which affirmed reproductive rights as human rights and emphasized the importance of reducing maternal mortality.

In 2024 the Inter-American Court of Human Rights ruled that El Salvador has violated Beatriz's human rights and recommended an update to the country's laws.

== See also ==
- Gender inequality in El Salvador
- Human rights in El Salvador
- Abortion by country
- Abortion in Chile
- Abortion in Nicaragua
- Abortion in Honduras
- Abortion law
- Reproductive rights in Latin America
