= Abortion in the Czech Republic =

Abortion in the Czech Republic is legally allowed up to 12 weeks of pregnancy, with medical indications up to 24 weeks of pregnancy, in case of grave problems with the fetus at any time. Those performed for medical indications are covered by public health insurance, but otherwise, abortion is relatively affordable in the Czech Republic. In Czech, induced abortion is referred to as interrupce or umělé přerušení těhotenství, often colloquially potrat ("miscarriage").

== History ==
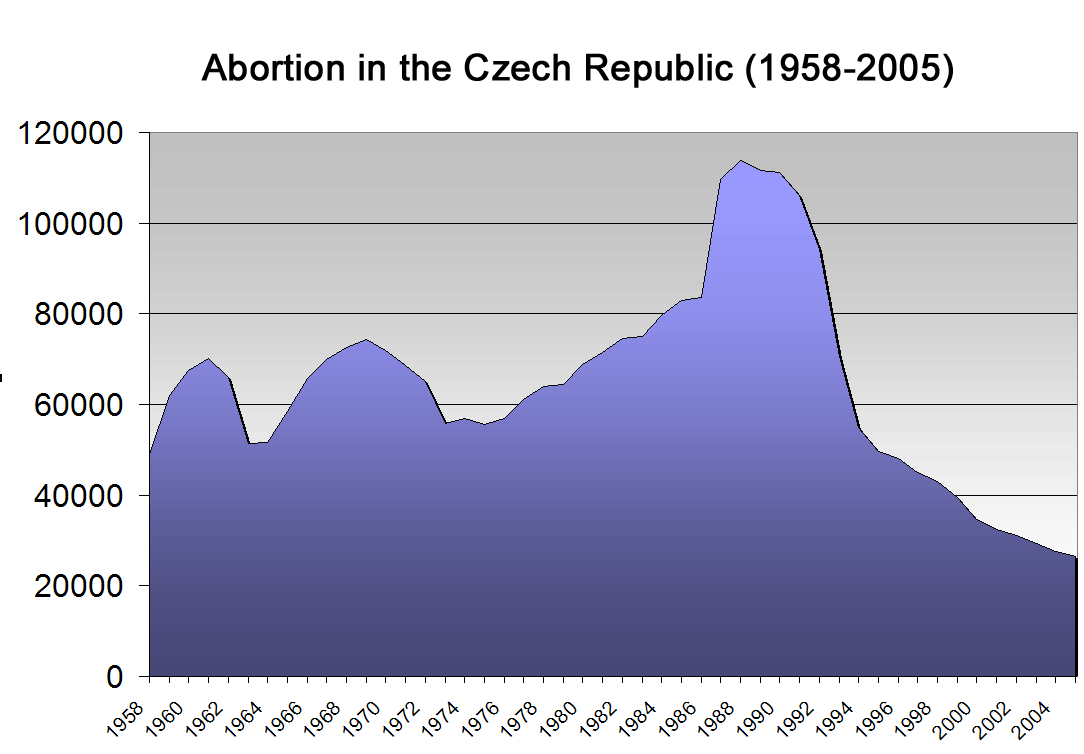
The number of induced abortions in the Czech Republic between 1958 and 2005

In 1957, abortions were legalized in Czechoslovakia, although with restrictions that depended on the current policy of the government. In 1986, the restrictions were lifted, resulting in growth of the number of abortions.

Since 1993, abortions for non-medical reasons have not been paid for by the public health system. The absolute peak of the number of abortions was reached in 1990 at over 100,000 per year, but has declined steadily down since then, reaching less than 1/3 of the peak level in 2004. Reasons for this decrease have included the wider availability of contraception and better sex education.

Medical abortion (with mifepristone) was registered in 2013.

== Statistics ==
Percentage of conceptions aborted in Czechia

The total number of abortions in 2009 was 40,528, of which 14,629 (36.1%) were spontaneous abortions, and 24,636 (60.8%) were induced abortions (historically the lowest number ever), of which 77% were "mini-interruptions" (within 8 weeks of pregnancy). 1,300 ectopic pregnancies were aborted. Total abortions per woman was 0.53, induced abortions was 0.34.

As of 2010, the abortion rate was 10.7 abortions per 1,000 women aged 15–44 years.

Regionally, the highest abortion rate is in northern and north-western Bohemia due to the structure of the population (in 2002 in Tachov District 31.3% of abortions were induced). The lowest ratios are in rural districts of southern Moravia and Bohemian-Moravian Highlands (in 2002 in Žďár nad Sázavou District 15.5% of abortions were induced). Abortion rates in large industrial cities are generally higher compared to small towns and the countryside.

Married women form the largest segment, but their ratio is decreasing in favour of unmarried young women. Women with tertiary level of education have about 6% of induced abortions. In 2009, 7.5% of the women were foreigners living in the Czech Republic. Official statistics about abortion tourism (mainly from neighbouring Poland where legal induced abortion is strictly limited) do not exist, but the numbers are estimated to be low.

== Public opinion ==
The public in the Czech Republic generally supports the legality of abortion. This has been confirmed by a number of opinion polls.

- An April 2003 CDC/ORC Macro report examined opinions on abortion among women aged 15 to 44, asking, "Do you think that a woman always has the right to decide about her pregnancy, including whether to have an abortion?" In 2003, 85% of Czechs surveyed thought a woman always had the right to an abortion and 15% did not. Of those 15%, 91% believed abortion was acceptable in cases of life endangerment, 74% in cases of fetal defects, 72% in cases of risk to health, 71% in cases of rape, 16% if the family could not financially support a child, and 8% if the woman was unmarried.
- A May 2005 Euro RSCG/TNS Sofres poll examined attitudes toward abortion in 10 European countries, asking polltakers whether they agreed with the statement, "If a woman doesn't want children, she should be allowed to have an abortion". 66% of Czechs replied "very much", 15% replied "a little", 8% replied "not really", and replied 10% "not at all". Support for the availability of abortion in the Czech Republic, at 81%, was the highest out of all the nations featured in the poll.
- A May 2007 CVVM poll found that 72% of Czechs believe that abortion should be allowed "at the request of the woman", 19% that it should be allowed for "societal reasons", 5% that it should be allowed only if "a woman’s health is at risk", 1% that it should be "banned".
- In a Pew Research survey from 2013, when asked about morality of abortion, 49% of respondents in the Czech Republic said that abortion is morally acceptable and 18% said it was unacceptable, and 18% that it was not a moral issue.
- In May 2019, within a regular survey, the Center for Public Opinion Research showed that 68% of Czechs agree that abortion should be a woman's decision in any case, 19% think abortion should only be allowed by taking into account the health and social considerations of the fetus and the woman, 7% think abortion should be allowed only if the mother's life is at risk, 3% think abortion should be prohibited altogether and another 3% did not know or did not want to give an opinion.
- In a survey from April/May 2023, the Center for Public Opinion Research found that 79% of Czechs believe abortion should be only the woman's decision in any case, 13% believe it should be allowed only for health and social reasons, 4% think it should be allowed only in the case of the woman's life being at risk, 2% think that abortion should be banned in any case and 2% are unsure or undecided.

== See also ==
- Abortion law
- Abortion debate
- Religion and abortion
