= Abortion in Nicaragua =

Abortion in Nicaragua is completely illegal. Prior to a change in the law, which took effect on 18 November 2006, the law allowed pregnancies to be terminated for "therapeutic" reasons, but this clause is no longer in effect.

== Abortion law in Nicaragua ==
The law before November 2006 permitted therapeutic abortion in Nicaragua so long as the woman and three doctors consented to it. The definition of "therapeutic" was not specific but was commonly understood to apply to cases in which the pregnant woman's life is endangered.

The law prior to November 2006 held that anyone who performed an abortion upon a woman without her permission would be subject to a prison term of three to six years. If the woman consented, both she and the person who performed the abortion faced a sentence of one to four years, and if she attempted a self-induced abortion, the term of imprisonment was four to eight years. A person who performed, or attempted to perform, an abortion, and, as a result, caused injury to the pregnant woman would be jailed for four to 10 years, or six to 10 years if it caused her death.

In October 2006, right before the general elections on 5 November 2006, the National Assembly passed a bill further restricting abortion 52–0 (9 abstaining, 29 absent). The European Union and the United Nations had urged for the vote to be delayed until after the presidential elections. The new law outlawed abortion in all circumstances, making Nicaragua the sixth country in the world to do so, after Chile (currently legal in certain circumstances), the Dominican Republic, El Salvador, Malta, and Vatican City. The Assembly rejected a proposal which would have increased the penalty for performing an illegal abortion from 10 to 30 years in prison. President Enrique Bolaños supported this measure, but signed the bill into law on 17 November 2006. Pro-choice groups in Nicaragua have criticized the change to the country's abortion law, and one, the Women's Autonomous Movement, were prepared to file an injunction to prevent it from being enacted.

== "Rosa" ==
One case of a termination which was permitted under the former exception to Nicaragua's ban upon abortion was that of a nine-year-old girl, known to the media only as "Rosa", who was impregnated as the result of child sexual abuse in 2003.

The child's family, who were living in Costa Rica at the time, returned to Nicaragua after Costa Rican hospital officials had opposed their desire to end the girl's pregnancy. After the family successfully sought an abortion in a private clinic, the Health Minister of Nicaragua, Lucía Salvo, declared that the procedure had constituted a criminal act, and officials threatened to press charges against those involved. However, Attorney General María del Carmen Solórzano stated that the abortion had not violated the law, as it had been performed in the interest of preserving the life of the girl.

Rosa's case drew international attention and prompted intense debate about abortion law within Nicaragua. Archbishop Miguel Obando y Bravo of Managua said that the family and doctors involved in obtaining the abortion had excommunicated themselves from the Roman Catholic Church; bishops in Nicaragua also released an open letter which likened the termination of pregnancy to terrorist bombings. Others called for the country's laws to be liberalized.

== Public opinion ==
An August–September 2006 Greenberg Quinlan Rosner Research poll on abortion to save the life of the mother found that 20% of Nicaraguans felt strongly that it should be "legal", 49% felt somewhat that it should be "legal", 18% felt strongly that it should be "illegal", and 10% felt somewhat that it should be "illegal".

== Results of the ban ==
A report on the effects was filed by the Human Rights Watch in October 2007. Human Rights Watch reports the deaths of at least eighty Nicaraguan women in the eleven months following the ban. To compile the report, interviews were conducted with health officials, women in need of health services, doctors in public health, doctors in the private healthcare system, and family members of women who died as a result of the ban.

An unintended side effect has been a "chilling" of other forms of obstetrical care for women. The report states, "While no doctors have been prosecuted for the crime of abortion, as far as we know, the mere possibility of facing criminal charges for providing lifesaving health services has had a deadly effect... the Health Ministry does not monitor the full implementation of the protocols, does not systematize complaints received for the delay or denial of care, and so far has not studied the impact of the law on the lives and health of women." The report quotes an obstetrician as saying "since the law was signed, [public hospitals] don't treat any hemorrhaging, not even post-menopausal hemorrhaging."

Nicaragua's Health Ministry officials told Human Rights Watch that they did not have any official documentation of the effects of the blanket ban and no plans for gathering such documentation. Consequently, statements that the ban has not caused women's deaths can not be substantiated. By contrast, the report cites several case histories. News reports put the number of deaths at 82 after the law has been in effect less than a year.

The point of view of Human Rights Watch is that the law intentionally denies women access to health services essential to saving their lives, and is thus inconsistent with Nicaragua's obligations under international human rights law to ensure women's right to life. Their report is called, "Over Their Dead Bodies".

== See also ==
- Abortion in Chile was also illegal without exception until 2017
- Abortion in El Salvador is also illegal without exception.
- Abortion law
- Reproductive rights in Latin America
