= Paternal rights and abortion =

Political issue

The paternal rights and abortion issue is an extension of both the abortion debate and the fathers' rights movement. Abortion can be a factor for disagreement and lawsuit between partners.

== History ==
Roman law allowed induced abortions but regulated it in consideration of the biological father. Emperor Septimius Severus ruled circa 211 AD that a woman who had an abortion without consent from her husband should face exile for having bereaved her husband of children.

In his speech Pro Cluentio, delivered in 66 BC, Cicero refers to a case he had heard of in which a woman from Miletus was sentenced to death for having aborted her pregnancy, upon receiving bribes from those who stood to inherit her husband's estate if he produced no heir. Cicero said that in doing so she had "destroyed the hope of the father, the memory of his name, the supply of his race, the heir of his family, a citizen intended for the use of the republic".

A 4th century BC Greek writer from Alexandria, Egypt, Sopater, quoted the lawyer Lysias, who had referred to a trial in Athens in which a man named Antigene accused his wife of having deprived him of a son by having an abortion.

== Men and abortion in law ==
Whether a male has a legal right to advance his personal interest, whether it be toward abortion, fatherhood, or adoption, over that of the female, differs by region.

In 2011, it was reported that Indonesia, Malawi, Syria, United Arab Emirates, Equatorial Guinea, Kuwait, Maldives, Morocco, South Korea, Saudi Arabia, Japan, Taiwan and Turkey all had laws which required that an abortion first be authorized by the woman's husband. However, in some countries, this stipulation could be bypassed or overridden if there is genuine concern for maternal health.

Since Roe v. Wade, some states in the United States have attempted to enact laws requiring spousal consent. All of these laws have been ruled unconstitutional, spousal consent in the 1976 decision Planned Parenthood v. Danforth and spousal awareness in the 1992 decision Planned Parenthood v. Casey

=== Legal cases ===
In China the husband of a woman who had an abortion filed a lawsuit against her in 2002 under a law intended to grant sexual equality in terms of childbearing and contraceptive decisions. The law stated that a woman has no overriding priority over her spouse in deciding whether to have a child.

A number of legal cases have arisen in the Western world in which men have tried to prevent women with whom they had been sexually active from obtaining an abortion, all of which failed:

- 1978: William Paton of Liverpool, United Kingdom, attempted to stop his separated wife, Joan, from undergoing an abortion in the 1978 case Paton v. Trustees of British Pregnancy Advisory Service Trustees. A judge ruled in his wife's favour and Mr. Paton's later request for a hearing before the European Court of Human Rights was also denied.
- 1987: Robert Carver of the United Kingdom tried to prevent an abortion in the 1987 case C v. S. He claimed that the Infant Life (Preservation) Act applied to the fetus, as, at the time, his ex-girlfriend was 21 weeks along. When the High Court of Justice and the Court of Appeal dismissed the case, it was brought before the House of Lords, where three Law Lords sided with the earlier decisions. The entire legal process took 36 hours, as the Health Authority refused to allow an abortion before a decision was reached, making it one of the fastest cases in the history of British law. Nonetheless, the woman involved chose to carry the pregnancy to term and gave the baby to Carver.
- 1989: Jean-Guy Tremblay of Quebec filed an injunction against his girlfriend, Chantal Daigle, in attempt to prevent her from obtaining an induced abortion in the 1989 Canadian case Tremblay v. Daigle. The Supreme Court of Canada ultimately ruled that there was no precedent for a man's right to protect his "potential progeny", as a fetus was not found to have a right to life under the Quebec Charter of Human Rights and Freedoms.
- 2001: Stephen Hone of Coventry, United Kingdom, unsuccessfully attempted to prevent his former girlfriend Claire Hansell from having an abortion.

About men deciding to decline parenthood in the event of an unintended pregnancy and asking for a financial abortion:

- 2006: Matt Dubay child support case was a legal case between Matt Dubay and his ex-girlfriend, both of Saginaw Township, Michigan. Dubay claimed in court documents that he informed his ex-girlfriend he had no interest in becoming a father. Dubay also claimed in court documents that in response, she said she was infertile and that, as an extra layer of protection, she was using contraception. The case was dubbed "Roe v. Wade for Men" by the National Center for Men. Dubay's lawsuit was dismissed by the judge.
- 2006: In Uruguay, a man promoted a protection against the legal abortion of his wife. The judge Pura Book prohibited that abortion.

Men who have tried to compel a woman to have an abortion:

- 2009: an unnamed Israeli man asked a court to order his former girlfriend to undergo an abortion, claiming that she had lied about contraception and that early fatherhood would "ruin his life". The court rejected his argument, stating that the father has no rights in a termination decision.

== Controversy ==
Those who support a man's right to intervene in a woman's reproductive decisions, argue that it is unreasonable that, after fertilisation has occurred, women have several opportunities to legally opt out of pregnancy and parenthood (such as the morning after pill, abortion, adoption or safe haven laws) whereas men have none. Armin Brott has said of this, "A woman can legally deprive a man of his right to become a parent or force him to become one against his will". The man can essentially have the obligations of fatherhood, such as child support, forced upon him against his wishes. This could potentially apply even if conception was without his knowledge or consent, such as birth control sabotage, sperm theft or sexual assault of the man.

=== Abortion vetoing ===
Men's rights and fathers' rights activists have argued that men should have veto power over their partners' decisions to abort. Similarly, philosopher George W. Harris has written that, if a man impregnates a woman with the explicit goal of having a child, in a manner that is mutually consensual, then it would be morally unacceptable for that woman to later have an abortion.

Those who object to men having a right to direct involvement argue that because it is the woman's body carrying the fetus, her determination for or against abortion should be the only one. Marsha Garrison, a professor at Brooklyn Law School, stated that U.S. courts acknowledge "that embryo is in the woman's body, it is within her and can't be separated from her, so it's not just her decision-making about whether to bear a child, it's about her body".

=== Abortion notification ===
A 2002 United States Gallup special report mentions only 38% of the population being opposed to notifying the husband of a married woman for an abortion. In a 2003 Gallup poll, 72% of respondents were in favor of notification to the husband, with 26% opposed; of those polled, 79% of males and 67% of females responded in favor of notification inside married couples.

=== Pregnancy vetoing ===
Bioethicist Jacob Appel has asked, "if one grants a man veto power over a woman's choice to have an abortion in cases where he is willing to pay for the child, why not grant him the right to demand an abortion where he is unwilling to provide for the child?"

=== Opting out ===
In reference to cases in which men who do not desire to become fathers have been expected by the mother to pay child support, Melanie McCulley, a South Carolina attorney, in her 1998 article, "The Male Abortion: The Putative Father's Right to Terminate His Interests in and Obligations to the Unborn Child", set forth the theory of the "male abortion", in which she argues that men should be able to terminate their legal obligations to unwanted children.

=== Opting in ===
It is also possible, rather than taking the stance that males should have the freedom to opt out of inherent responsibilities and rights, to take the stance that one must opt-in and agree to undertake those responsibilities to be compelled to follow them, and only through doing so, earn parental rights. This is what occurs during adoption.

== See also ==
- Abortion
- Abortion debate
- Abortion law
- Dubay v. Wells
- Social equality
- Father's rights movement
- Gender equality
- Legal protection of access to abortion
- Masculism
- Men's liberation
- Men's movement
- Men's rights
- Men's studies
- Minors and abortion
- Paper Abortion
- Paternity fraud
- Planned Parenthood v. Casey
- Reproductive rights
- Sperm theft
- Tremblay v. Daigle
