= Lilia Lemoine =

Argentine politician (born 1980)

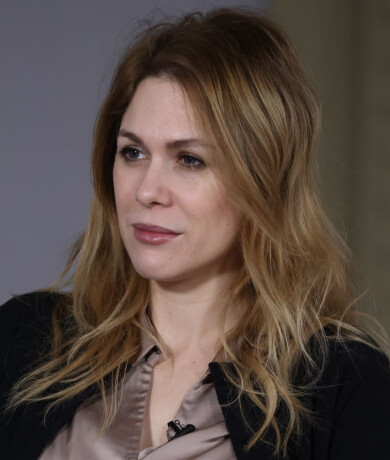
Lilia Lemoine in 2024

Lilia Adela Bolukalo Lemoine (born 7 November 1980) is an Argentine politician, cosplayer, and make-up artist. She has served since 2023 as a National Deputy of Argentina, elected as a member of La Libertad Avanza representing Buenos Aires Province.

== Political and philosophical views ==
Lemoine believes that the Earth is flat and that Antarctica is surrounded by an ice wall. She has proposed that Moon landings and Antarctic expeditions are an orchestrated hoax meant to cover up these facts.

She is against the legalization of abortion in Argentina. On that issue, she said that she wanted to make a draft of a law to allow all men to renounce paternity obligations, since women can abort. This statement was widely criticized and denounced as unconstitutional.

== Biography ==
Lemoine was born in José León Suárez city, San Martín, into a middle-class family, and worked in many companies in costumer support, before starting as a cosplayer and make-up artist at the age of 29.

She was a candidate for the Argentine Congress for the first time in 2019, supporting José Luis Espert, but she was not elected at that time. She met Javier Milei through his sister, Karina, and started helping Milei in his presentations on TV and theater. She dated him for a short period. She was elected as a deputy to the National Congress on the 2023 Argentine general election.
