= Dubay v. Wells =

2006 legal case

Dubay v. Wells, or the Matt Dubay child support case, was an American legal case in 2006 between Matt Dubay and his ex-girlfriend Lauren Wells, both of Saginaw Township, Michigan. The case was dubbed "Roe v. Wade for Men" by the National Center for Men. The case concerned whether the Michigan Paternity Act violates the United States Constitution's Equal Protection Clause, in that the act allegedly applies to men but not to women.

== History of the case ==
In the fall of 2004, Dubay and Wells became involved in a romantic relationship. Dubay claimed in court documents that he informed Wells he had no interest in becoming a father. He also claimed in court documents that in response, she said she was infertile and that, as an extra layer of protection, she was using contraception.

The parties' relationship later deteriorated. Shortly thereafter, Wells informed Dubay she was pregnant, allegedly with his child. She chose to carry the child to term and the child was born on an unspecified date in 2005. Dubay claimed in court documents that he consistently told Wells that he did not want to be a father, throughout the pregnancy, and after the birth of the child.

== Issues involved in the case ==
The specific legal challenge in the case was based on whether Michigan's child support laws apply to men and women equally. If not, then it was argued by Dubay that they violate Equal Protection. Jeffrey Cojocar, Dubay's attorney, maintained that Michigan does not force women to make child support payments for children that they do not want to parent, and accordingly, men should not have to either.

The argument made by the state of Michigan, as well as by the National Organization for Women and the Association for Children for Enforcement of Support, was that the needs of the child for support from both parents outweigh any of the circumstances surrounding the birth.

The argument for why the case paralleled the Roe v. Wade ruling by the United States Supreme Court was that in Roe v. Wade, it was decided that women have the ability to decline parenthood in the event of an unintended pregnancy. This case was claimed to be about giving men that same reproductive choice, by offering the possibility of a "financial abortion".

Additional issues involved in the case were whether a man should have responsibility placed on him when his decisions were based on misleading information provided by someone else about her ability or intentions to have a child, and whether states pursue men too aggressively for child support payments due to the financial incentives they have to avoid having to provide public assistance.

== Legal action ==
On March 9, 2006, the National Center for Men challenged the child support order in District Court. Michigan's Attorney General moved to dismiss the case, and on July 17, 2006, District Court Judge David M. Lawson agreed and dismissed Dubay's lawsuit.

The National Center for Men appealed the case to the United States Court of Appeals for the Sixth Circuit on May 14, 2007. Oral arguments began September 10, 2007, and in November the appeals court affirmed the District court decision, noting precedent stating that "the Fourteenth Amendment does not deny to [the] State the power to treat different classes of persons in different ways."

In its dismissal of the case, the U.S. Court of Appeals (Sixth Circuit) stated:

Dubay's claim that a man's right to disclaim fatherhood would be analogous to a woman's right to abortion rests upon a false analogy. In the case of a father seeking to opt out of fatherhood and thereby avoid child support obligations, the child is already in existence and the state therefore has an important interest in providing for his or her support.

The National Center for Men asked Dubay to appeal the case to the U.S. Supreme Court, but Dubay declined.

== See also ==
- Fathers' rights movement
- Paper abortion
- Paternal rights and abortion
- Roe v Wade
- Sperm theft
