= Paper abortion =

Ability of father to opt out of parenthood

Paper abortion, also known as a financial abortion, male abortion or a statutory abortion, is the proposed ability of the biological father, before the birth of the child, to opt out of any rights, privileges, and responsibilities toward the child, including financial support. By this means, before a child is born, a man would be able to absolve himself of both the privileges and demands of fatherhood.

== The male abortion ==
The concept begins with the premise that when a woman becomes pregnant, she has the option of abortion, adoption, or parenthood. It argues, in the context of gender equality, that in the earliest stages of pregnancy the putative (alleged) father should have the same right to relinquish all future parental rights and financial responsibility — leaving the informed mother with the same three options. At present, the putative father is held financially responsible for a child no matter what the circumstances of conception, including statutory rape of the father by the mother (see Hermesmann v. Seyer), and fraud (the mother used the father's sperm to become pregnant without his knowledge or consent).

The term "male abortion" was coined by Melanie McCulley, a South Carolina attorney, in a 1988 article, "The Male Abortion: The Putative Father's Right to Terminate His Interests in and Obligations to the Unborn Child". McCulley argued that men should be able to terminate their legal obligations to unwanted children. According to McCulley:

When a female determines she is pregnant, she has the freedom to decide if she has the maturity level to undertake the responsibilities of motherhood, if she is financially able to support a child, if she is at a place in her career to take the time to have a child, or if she has other concerns precluding her from carrying the child to term. After weighing her options, the female may choose abortion. Once she aborts the fetus, the female's interests in and obligations to the child are terminated. In stark contrast, the unwed father has no options. His responsibilities to the child begin at conception and can only be terminated with the female's decision to abort the fetus or with the mother's decision to give the child up for adoption. Thus, he must rely on the decisions of the female to determine his future. The putative father does not have the luxury, after the fact of conception, to decide that he is not ready for fatherhood. Unlike the female, he has no escape route (4).

== Debate and public attention ==
=== Support ===
In a 1996 article "Abortion and Fathers' Rights," philosopher Steven Hales made an argument that presupposes the following assertions:

1. That women have an absolute right to elective abortion care;
2. That men and women have equal moral rights and duties and should have equal legal right and duties; and
3. That parents have a moral duty to support their children once they are born and legal duties of support should supervene on this moral duty.

Hales contends that the conjunction of these three principles is prima facie inconsistent and that this inconsistency should be eradicated by firstly acknowledging that men have no absolute duty to provide material support for their children, and secondly by admitting that fathers have the right of refusal. Philosopher Alex Naileg showed that similar premises indeed lead to a strict logical contradiction.

Laurie Shrage, professor of philosophy and women's and gender studies, questions whether men should be 'penalized for being sexually active', and she puts the subject in the perspective of feminists who had to fight the same idea with different gender portent, namely that consenting to sexual intercourse is not the same as consenting to parenthood. Furthermore, both men and children are punished, according to professor Shrage; children have to live with an absent father who never 'voluntarily' became a parent.

[If] women’s partial responsibility for pregnancy does not obligate them to support a fetus, then men’s partial responsibility for pregnancy does not obligate them to support a resulting child.

— Elizabeth Brake in the Journal of Applied Philosophy, 2005

At most, according to Brake, men should be responsible for helping with the medical expenses and other costs of a pregnancy for which they are partly responsible.

Interestingly, there is overlap between masculists and feminists on this point. For example, Australian writer and comedian Catherine Deveny makes the point that requiring the male to be automatically resigned to forced parenthood is a violation of a man's right to choose when women have various options to absolve the man of parental responsibility; namely, she says, "the options are abortion, adoption, parenting together or sole parenting." Deveny also condemns the antiquated notion of "men [being] obligated to provide for women", which she considers to be reminiscent of "oppressive heteronormative values [that] belong in the 1950s". As a solution, Deveney suggests a "no kids yet" register that would give men an opt-out solution that would prevent fathers from being forced to father a child against their will—or at least prevent them from being forced to pay child support.

=== Opposition ===
Paper abortion has met opposition by those who see it as an excuse for men to shirk their responsibilities as a father. Critics say that men should use birth control (either contraception or sterilization) or practice abstinence if they want to avoid the financial and personal responsibilities of fatherhood. This stance does not account for those men who conceive a child even after taking reasonable precautions, or involuntary conception as a result of birth control sabotage, sexual assault, statutory rape of underage boys by adult women, or sperm theft.

== By country ==
=== Argentina ===
Lilia Lemoine, elected deputy from Argentina and ally of president-elect Javier Milei, announced that her first bill will be to offer parents the possibility of renouncing paternity. The project determines that the pregnant woman must notify the father of this pregnancy within 15 days and the father will be able to decide whether he wants to recognize the child or not. Lemoine states that if the man does not want to, he will not have the obligation to pay child support. According to the deputy, it is unfair for a woman to be able to renounce motherhood by killing her child, referring to the 2020 approval of abortion in Argentina.

=== Denmark ===
The concept of a paper abortion was first introduced in Denmark in 2000 by the socioeconomicist Henrik Platz. He says that it is necessary from an egalitarian perspective, to ensure that women and men have equal rights under the law. According to a Gallup poll from 2014 and earlier polls, between 40% and 70% of Danes agree with legalizing paper abortion.

Sociologist Karen Sjørup, who conducted research on the topic argues that it would give women more freedom by allowing those who want to become mothers without having to share the rights and duties of parenthood with men an additional way to do so. She also suggests that it could decrease the abortion rate because it would prevent men who wished to avoid fatherhood from pressuring women to abort.

Advocates argue that just as women are able to choose whether to have a child or not, men should also be able to choose whether to assume paternity or not. Allowing men to have the opportunity to renounce the economic, social and legal responsibility for an unborn child during the first three months of pregnancy would give men and women as close to equal opportunities as possible.

=== Sweden ===
In 2016, a regional branch of the Swedish Liberal Youth Party decided to support paper abortion for men until the 18th week of pregnancy, the time limit on abortions for women. The proposition was supported by some commentators, but not by the LYP's parent party.

== See also ==
- Fathers' rights movement
- Hermesmann v. Seyer
- Paternal rights and abortion
- Forced fatherhood
- Dubay v. Wells
- Violence against men
