= Forced fatherhood =

Causing a pregnancy using semen obtained by force or deception

Forced fatherhood or imposed paternity can include deception by a partner about their ability to get pregnant or use of contraceptives, birth control sabotage, paternity fraud and sexual assaults of males that result in pregnancy.

"Sperm theft", also known as "unauthorized use of sperm", "spermjacking" or "spurgling" (a portmanteau of sperm and burgling), refers to a specific form of forced fatherhood in which a man's semen is used to impregnate a woman without his consent. Although the term uses the word "theft", it more closely falls under a state of fraud or breach of contract. Stealing of sperm in itself without using it for successful insemination is not illegal and is difficult to prove. It usually has no bearing on issues like child support. It is considered an issue in the men's rights movement.

== Definition ==
Forced fatherhood falls into three main categories:

- Sperm stashing – Occurs when a man's semen is obtained surreptitiously, such as from a discarded condom, and subsequently used to inseminate a woman.
- Non-consensual sexual intercourse – The sexual assault, rape or statutory rape of a man or boy that results in pregnancy.
- Improper use of assisted reproductive technology – When a man's frozen sperm sample is used, without his permission, to fertilize an egg during IVF and other artificial insemination procedures.

== Prevalence ==
The prevalence of imposed paternity is difficult to measure. Research for the Centers for Disease Control and Prevention in 2011 found that approximately 10.4% (or an estimated 11.7 million) of men in the United States reported ever having an intimate partner who tried to get pregnant when they did not want to or tried to stop them from using birth control. In a survey of 5,000 women for the British magazine That's Life, 42% stated that they would lie about using birth control in order to get pregnant, in spite of the wishes of their partner.

== Legal status ==
Forced fatherhood (namely a woman becoming pregnant against a man's will or without his consent) is not illegal anywhere. Cases are usually reported in connection with disputes over child support. When the obligation to provide child support is challenged by men who allege that their sperm had been stolen or otherwise used to inseminate a woman without their consent, courts will typically enforce the doctrine of strict liability: namely, that a man is liable to support a child conceived with his sperm, irrespective of the circumstances of conception, including any criminal conduct on the part of the mother. Plaintiff arguments of tort liability for fraud or misrepresentation typically do not hold up. Courts are also thought to be reluctant to remedy such grievances as it would mean ruling that a child was born as a result of deception. In some cases, a victim of sperm theft can sue the perpetrator for emotional trauma inflicted.

Myrisha S. Lewis has written that male victims of contraceptive fraud, sexual assault, and statutory rape should not be "punished with child support liability, but instead receive compensation for the unauthorized use of their biological products." She argues that the policy of strict liability unjustly penalises male victims of sexual assault. She contrasts their status with that of voluntary sperm donors, who are exempt from child support liability.

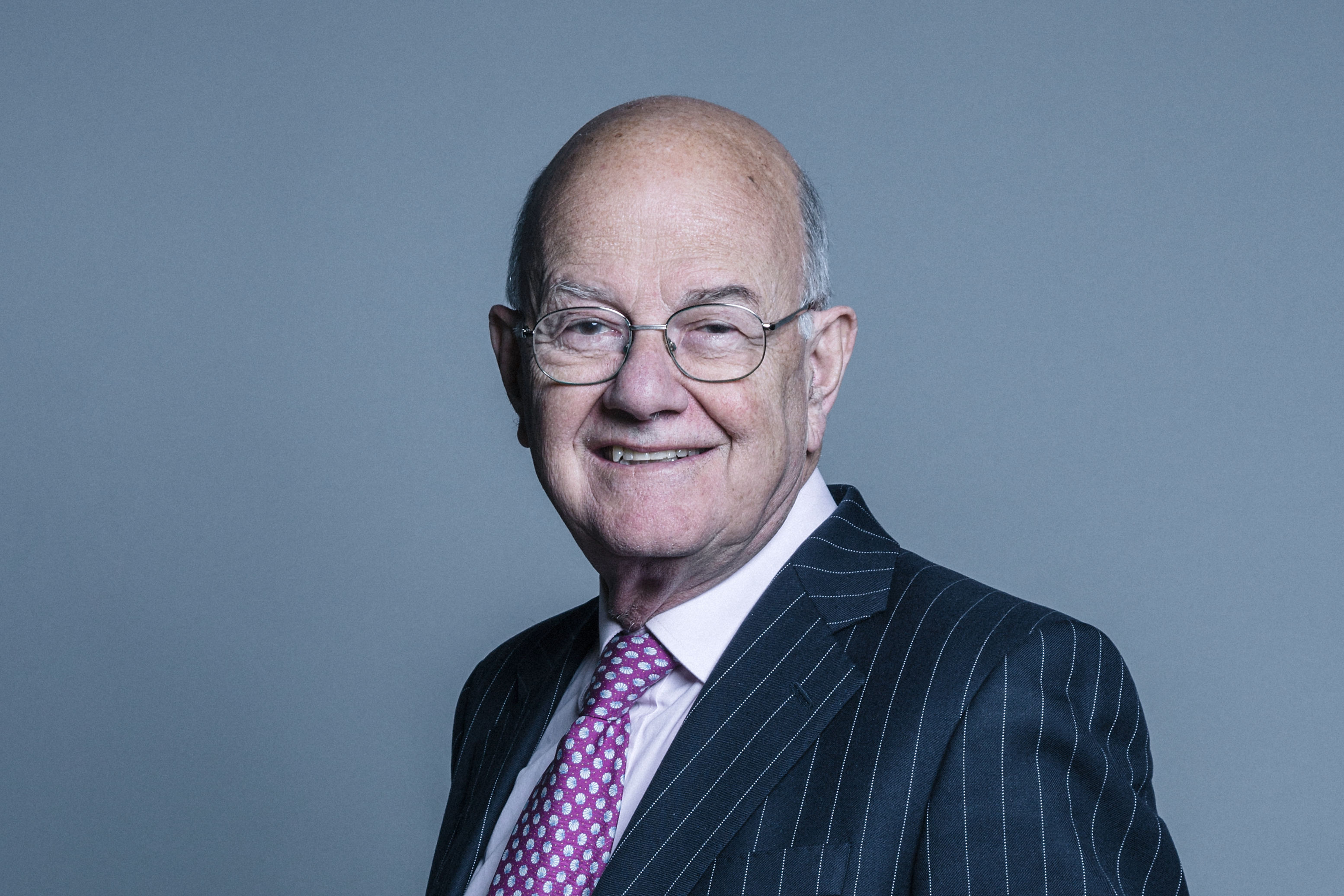
Igor Lord Judge, who gave a landmark ruling in relation to forced fatherhood.

In a "landmark ruling" establishing the legal principle that a man's semen is his own property, Lord Chief Justice, Lord Judge, the most senior judge in England and Wales, ruled in favor of six unnamed men who sued the NHS for damages after their sperm samples were lost. The men were all cancer patients who had been advised to freeze their sperm due to the risk of chemotherapy damaging their fertility. Lord Judge, Master of the Rolls Sir Anthony Clarke, and Lord Justice Wilson ruled that the sperm samples were legally the property of the men, and dismissed the argument made by the NHS that the samples should be given the same status as discarded toenails or hair.

Steve Moxon has written, "it must only be a matter of time before the absurdity of 'sperm theft' is stamped upon. The position at the moment is that of a dam held back by 'the best interests of the child' concept, which is proxy for 'the best interests of the state' in not paying child support. It only takes one case to successfully assert the rights of the deceived man for the dam wall to break."

In her article, "It's ten o'clock: do you know where your sperm are?", Laura Wish Morgan highlights the strict liability theory of parentage. She notes cases where the father has been held liable for child support even if he was underage at the time of conception, and thus a victim of statutory rape ("The sexual intercourse in these cases is "factually voluntary" and thus intentional, even if it is nonconsensual in the criminal sense"). Morgan also documents a "somewhat troubling" case where a woman raped a man after he had gotten drunk at a party and passed out, and thus he did not knowingly or willingly have intercourse with her. The mother also admitted that she had done this. Nevertheless, the court held him liable for child support ("the wrongful conduct of the mother in causing conception did not obviate the father's support obligation"). Morgan concludes: "to all men who complain about paying child support for children they did not want, the simple advice is, "Shut up and put on a condom. And dispose of it yourself."

== Cases ==
=== Germany ===
In Germany, sperm theft is known as Samenraub. Forced fatherhood stood in the forefront of a 1986 case at the Federal Court of Justice. It decided, in a case of a non-married couple, that it is a woman's personal and unalienable right to cease hormonal contraception at any time, even without telling her partner. It also decided that the husband is still liable for the financial support of the children he never agreed to have.

The phrase entered the popular lexicon after a 2001 tabloid scandal involving Boris Becker and a resulting headline in Bild: War es Samenraub? ('Was it semen robbery?'). Becker had claimed that a child he fathered with a Russian waitress was conceived when she stole his sperm after oral sex. He alleged that she inseminated herself following a tryst in a linen cupboard at the London restaurant Nobu. Subsequently, he reversed his stance, accepted fatherhood and agreed to take responsibility for the child. In 2013, the noun Samenraub was included in the Duden dictionary.

A man's request to be relieved of paying child support was rejected by a Munich court. The child was conceived from an egg fertilized with his sperm without his permission. He revoked his consent for his sperm to be used after he and his ex-wife separated and said that she twice forged his signature at an IVF clinic. However, the court said that he was not clear enough when he revoked his consent and the clinic had no reason to doubt the validity of what he alleged were forged signatures.

In 2012, two male gynaecologists were ordered by a Dortmund court to pay child support in place of the biological father. They had helped a mother conceive twins via artificial insemination using the father's sperm, but did so without the father's consent. A contract had stipulated that his sperm was to be destroyed after a year.

On 4 February 2013, the 22nd civil senate of the Hamm Higher Regional Court dismissed a man's claim for indemnification for exemption from maintenance obligations in the so-called "semen robbery process" and thus deviated from the lower court judgment of the Dortmund Regional Court. The man alleged that his signature on the informed consent form had been forged and that his sperm sample had been used for artificial insemination without permission. The court rejected his argument.

In 2022, a 39-year-old woman received a 6-month suspended jail sentence for poking holes in a condom to get pregnant with a man with whom she was in a friends-with-benefits relationship. She wanted to enter a serious relationship while she knew he did not. She failed to get pregnant.

=== Israel ===
In Israel, stealing sperm (גנבת זרע) is a common phrase used to denote a woman sleeping with a man in order to get pregnant without telling him. It receives ample media coverage. Some consider that the issue is unbalanced in favor of women and men who fall victim to "sperm theft" should also have the right to say no to parenthood.

In 2012, the Tiberias Family Court ruled against a man who asked to be excused from paying child support, claiming the mother of his child had "stolen his sperm" in order to get pregnant. In dismissing the suit, the judge ruled that "even if her biological father's claims are true, they are not sufficient to prevent the minor from succeeding in her current suit." The judge also cited other cases in which men had been ordered to pay child support, even though they had argued they were "fathers against their will".

In 2013, in a "milestone verdict", a Tel Aviv court ordered a woman to pay her former partner ₪110,000 ($31,000) in damages. She had informed him that she was infertile and persuaded him not to use contraception. Subsequently, she became pregnant and sued him for child support after he refused to acknowledge paternity of the child. Previous judgements had gone against him. In January 2017, the compensation imposed on the woman was revoked after the district court hearing the appeal ruled that the sex did not result from misrepresentation, and it was not proven that the plaintiff was interested at the time in the defendant's medical condition or the need to use contraception.

On 4 September 2018, a Tel Aviv court partially accepted the suit of a man claiming "forced fatherhood". Judge Shifra Glick determined that the defendant had been dishonest with the plaintiff, had asked him not to use contraceptives, and had told him that she was using an IUD, thereby "making the plaintiff a parent against his will". The plaintiff's claims of robbery, negligence and fraud were rejected. The plaintiff was awarded limited compensation of ₪40,000 ($11,160).

=== Italy ===
In September 2013, the Italian Supreme Court ruled against a man who claimed that the conception of his son was a result of semen theft. He said that he never had sex with the woman and claimed she had stolen a test tube containing his seminal fluid. The court stated that he had failed to prove that a theft took place, but ruled that the fact of his biological connection to the child was sufficient to require him to pay maintenance, regardless of the circumstances: "paternity is attributed as a juridical consequence of conception, so that the biological element is decisive, and, since there is also no need for a conscious will to procreate, no relevance can be attributed to the wants of the alleged father". They affirmed the lower court's award of €350 per month child support to the woman and he was also ordered to pay her €1000 in compensation.

=== Sweden ===
An episode of the SVT investigative programme Uppdrag granskning, entitled "Spermiestölden", spoke to a number of people who were conceived with stolen sperm over the period 1985 to 1996. It came to light when they began tracing their biological fathers as adults. The fathers had submitted sperm samples at Halmstad hospital whilst undergoing fertility treatment with their wives, but it was then used to impregnate other women without their permission. The mothers believed the sperm was supplied by voluntary donors. The doctor involved is now deceased. As the events occurred over 35 years ago, legal action is considered time-barred in Sweden. One of the men involved submitted his case to the European Court of Human Rights, claiming a breach of Article 8 of the European Convention on Human Rights. His counsel said "It should go without saying that the public may not use individuals' gametes without their consent. It is also important that the European Court of Human Rights states that violations of human rights cannot be time-barred until you know that your rights have been violated."

=== Turkey ===
A court in İzmir province, Turkey, dismissed the paternity lawsuit of a 61-year-old man who insisted that the mother, who gave birth to twin boys via in vitro fertilization in 2015, stole his sperm. A DNA test in 2018 proved that he was the father and he was mandated to pay maintenance for them. The judge stated that sperm cannot be considered movable property.

=== United Kingdom ===
In June 2000, the Birmingham High Court rejected Jonathan Evans' challenge to a child support order. Evans cited a letter the child's mother had written him in which she admitted to inseminating herself with his sperm after retrieving it from a used condom whilst he was in the shower. The judge ruled that, irrespective of how the baby was conceived, Evans was the legal father and was required to pay maintenance. The case was discussed on BBC Radio 4's Woman's Hour.

Daily Mail columnist Liz Jones admitted in 2011 to stealing the sperm of her ex-husband Nirpal Dhaliwal from a condom and trying to become pregnant. She did not get pregnant. Dhaliwal wrote "Luckily for me, my little troopers stayed loyal and didn't go to work for her, otherwise I could've found myself a father, emotionally and financially trapped by her for the rest of my life."

In 2011, The Daily Telegraph reported on an unnamed woman who forged her ex-husband's signature at an IVF clinic, allowing doctors to create embryos using his frozen sperm. She subsequently gave birth to two children via the procedure. The man had stored his frozen sperm at the Bourn Hall Clinic in Cambridge after undergoing arthritis treatment that could have left him infertile. He said he had no knowledge of the procedure until three years later. He was ordered to pay her an additional £100,000 to help raise the children. The woman said, "I have no regrets, I would do it again."

In January 2019, a father lost his claim for damages from IVF Hammersmith. His ex-partner forged his signature on a consent form in order to conceive a child using a frozen egg fertilized with his sperm at the clinic. The court accepted that his signature had been forged and the insemination procedure was done without his consent, but denied his claim for compensation, on the grounds of public policy that damages cannot be awarded for the birth of a healthy child. The law has since changed to require photographic identification as well as a signature to ensure that the man authorising the use of frozen embryos is indeed the father.

The Guardian reported on a man who gave a sperm sample to a Harley Street fertility clinic in the 1960s for analysis. Unbeknownst to him, the sample was used to impregnate couples undergoing fertility treatment at the clinic. Now in his 80s, he learned that he has a daughter as a result. Her parents were told the donor was a medical student. The man maintained he never gave permission for the use of his sperm for anything except fertility analysis but said "I'm too old to be angry now. Not really, no."

In July 2022 in the House of Commons, Flick Drummond MP raised the case of a constituent whose sperm was used by his ex-partner to become pregnant without his consent. Drummond characterized this as "not just 'sperm theft', but a form of sexual assault and a violation of my constituent's rights", but noted that, according to the Crown Prosecution Service, there is no law to deal with this act as a sexual assault. She asked Attorney General Suella Braverman to look into amending the law.

=== United States ===
In 1981, former NYPD Detective and whistleblower Frank Serpico argued that he should not have to pay child support because the mother deceived him into the pregnancy. The mother denied this, but a female friend of hers testified in support of his account. She said that the mother intended to seduce Serpico to get pregnant and that she deliberately stopped taking birth control pills, but had assured him that she was still taking them. The judge ruled in Serpico's favor, stating that the mother's planned and intentional deceit barred her from any financial benefit at the father's expense. However, this was overruled by a higher court, which decided the charges of fraud were irrelevant and the only consideration was the "best interests of the child". The tribunal ruled that he had to pay maintenance of around $900 per month. One of Serpico's lawyers was Karen DeCrow, a former director of the National Organization for Women. DeCrow told the court "Autonomous women making independent decisions about their lives should not expect men to finance their choice".

In SF vs. TM (1996), "S.F." was a man who passed out intoxicated at a party in the home of a woman ("T.M."), who raped him while he was unconscious. S.F. had no knowledge of this until he woke up the following morning with his lower clothes removed. T.M. became pregnant as a result of the rape and S.F. was ordered to pay child support. He appealed, arguing that he "did not knowingly and willfully participate in any sexual activity with the mother of the minor child." S.F. further asserted that being compelled to pay child support for a child conceived as a result of non-consensual intercourse deprived him of property rights and equal protection under the law. He produced expert testimony that it was possible for a male to get an erection and ejaculate while unconscious. The court nevertheless rejected his argument, stating that "the child is an innocent party... any wrongful conduct on the part of the mother should not alter the father's duty to provide support for the child." S.F. was ordered to pay $106.04 per month in child support, plus $8,960.64 in arrears. The dissenting opinion described the mother's misconduct as "reprehensible" and a "misdemeanor" and said a male rape victim should be required to pay child support only if the mother cannot support the child herself.

In 1997, the Louisiana Court of Appeal ruled against Emile Frisard in his suit against Debra Rojas. Frisard was visiting his sick parents in hospital when Rojas, a nurse at the hospital, offered to perform oral sex on him, provided he wore a condom. Frisard accepted and after the act was complete, Rojas kept the condom and used Frisard's semen to impregnate herself. She subsequently sued him for child support. Frisard argued that he only consented to oral sex and never consented to the use of his sperm for insemination purposes. Frisard was ordered to pay $436.81 per month in child support, $17,901.21 in arrears and 5% in court costs. Addressing the issue of Rojas' self-insemination without Frisard's consent, the court dismissed the point: "[Frisard's] own testimony showed that he had some sort of sexual contact with the plaintiff around the time frame of alleged conception." The fact of any sexual contact between them was sufficient to hold Frisard liable for child support.

A Massachusetts court awarded Richard Gladu $108,000 in compensation from Boston IVF after the fertility clinic impregnated his ex-wife with their frozen embryos without his consent, resulting in the birth of a daughter. Gladu was awarded $98,000 for the cost of raising his then seven-year-old daughter, and $10,000 for emotional distress.

The Illinois Appellate Court ruled that Richard O. Phillips could press a claim for emotional distress against his former partner Sharon Irons, overruling the circuit court which had dismissed Phillips' suit in 2003. Phillips claimed that Irons surreptitiously kept his semen in her mouth after oral sex and used it to self-inseminate, later giving birth to a daughter. The court ruled that Phillips' claims, if true, meant that Irons "deceitfully engaged in sexual acts, which no reasonable person would expect could result in pregnancy, to use plaintiff's sperm in an unorthodox, unanticipated manner yielding extreme consequences." The appellate court dismissed Phillips' claims of fraud and theft: "when plaintiff 'delivered' his sperm, it was a gift – an absolute and irrevocable transfer of title to property from a donor to a donee. There was no agreement that the original deposit would be returned upon request."

In 2015, Layne Hardin and his former partner Katherine LeBlanc (of Houston, Texas) sued Texas Andrology Services and Hardin's former girlfriend, Tobie Devall, charging that Devall had illegally acquired Hardin's frozen sperm from the facility and used it to get pregnant. Devall claimed that she did so with Hardin's agreement. While still in a relationship with LeBlanc, Hardin had a vasectomy and had eight vials of sperm frozen. An agreement between Hardin, LeBlanc and the facility stated that only LeBlanc would have access to the sperm. A jury found in favor of Hardin and LeBlanc. Texas Andrology Services was ordered to pay $250,000 apiece to Hardin and LeBlanc. Devall was ordered to pay $125,000 to Hardin and $250,000 to LeBlanc. On appeal, the compensation was reduced to $19,500.

A New York court ordered Deon Francois to pay child support to his ex-wife Chaamel after she forged his signature and allegedly had it notarized with a stolen seal and used his frozen sperm sample to conceive a daughter through a fertility clinic. Francois sued the New York University clinic for $9 million, insisting that they should pay the child support.

Joe Pressil of Houston Texas sued 'Advanced Fertility', a Texas fertility clinic, in 2011. Pressil claimed that the clinic accepted a semen sample from a woman claiming to be his wife and then performed in vitro fertilization, resulting in the birth of twins. Pressil says this was all done without his knowledge or consent and he only found out about it when he found receipts from the clinic. He claimed she smuggled the sperm to the clinic after saving their used condoms after sex. He said the entire situation had caused him mental harm and economic distress due to substantial child support payments.

=== Venezuela ===
Maelo Ruiz claimed that a fan named Karla Ankara Toledo stole his sperm from a Venezuela sperm bank and used it to conceive twin girls. He announced he was taking legal action. Toledo countersued for child maintenance.

== Media coverage ==
In 2019, a story circulated on the internet that a Las Vegas hotel cleaner had become pregnant after stealing sperm from a millionaire's used condom and successfully sued him for child support. The story was later revealed to be a satire.

Derrick Rose claimed that NBA players are taught to flush their condoms down the toilet or take them away after sexual intercourse so that women cannot use the sperm to impregnate themselves.

The documentary The Red Pill discusses spermtheft as an issue that men and boys face.

Cosmopolitan did a feature on spurglary in 2013. Marriage and family therapist Carla Willis-Brandon stated "I've begun to notice a growing trend in the number of women tricking men into having a baby, usually by lying about contraception... these women usually hope a child will smooth over issues in the relationship. If she's with a man who's commitment-phobic, she might feel a baby will 'seal the deal'". However, she knew only one couple in this situation who stayed together afterwards. One man interviewed said his friend was spurgled, but said this was "the making of him." A woman recounted that she got pregnant after she stopped taking the pill without telling her boyfriend, hoping he would marry her. Instead, he broke off the relationship and moved overseas.

Make a Mom, a company which sells home insemination kits, ran a series of adverts on X encouraging women to retrieve sperm from discarded condoms without their partner's knowledge and inseminate themselves with it. They used taglines like "Don’t Need Permission, Made My Decision" and showed a video of a woman doing this, with the text "Woman quietly sneaks condom from trash to perform home insemination while her partner sleeps in the other room. What do you think about this? Is this legal? Will he still owe child support?"

== Mythology and religion ==
In Ancient Greek Mythology, Myrrha fell in love with her father Cinyras and tricked him into having sexual intercourse with her ("climb[ed] into his bed one dark night, when her nurse had made him too drunk to realize what he was doing"). She was transformed into a myrrh tree and gave birth to their son Adonis.

The Osiris myth of Egyptian mythology describes how Nephthys, the childless twin sister of Isis, tricked Isis' husband Osiris into fathering a child (Anubis) with her either by pretending to be Isis or by getting Osiris drunk. After his birth, Anubis was raised by Isis. At a later point in time, Isis reassembled the body of the murdered Osiris, and succeeded in becoming pregnant with Horus from the seed of Osiris.

In Plato's Symposium, Penia, the goddess of poverty, conceives Eros with Poros after "Poros who was the worse for nectar—there was no wine in those days—went into the garden of Zeus and fell into a heavy sleep".

The idea of demons haunting people in their sleep can be found in Jewish and Christian mythology (see Lilith). They feed on the life energy of sleeping people with whom they mate at night. A succubus steals the semen of the sleeping man unnoticed, who can only remember it the next day in the form of a dream. During the early modern witch hunts, sexual intercourse with the devil was regarded as an act deliberately desired by a warlock or a witch, with the devil appearing to men in the form of a succubus and women as an incubus. The Malleus Maleficarum describes how the succubus changed after coitus and, unnoticed by the man, how its semen was then used in the form of an incubus to impregnate a woman.

In the Bible, Lot is deceived by his daughters into fathering children with them. Tamar deceives her father-in-law Judah into having sexual intercourse with her by pretending to be a prostitute. When Judah discovers that Tamar is pregnant he prepares to have her killed, but recants and confesses when he finds out that he is the father.

== Popular culture ==
In Roald Dahl's novel My Uncle Oswald, the titular character plots to steal sperm from famous men and sell it to women who want children sired by geniuses.

The main theme of the 2004 UK TV drama "Whose Baby?", starring Andrew Lincoln and Sophie Okonedo, is focused around an instance of sperm theft. The female lead character inseminates herself in the shower with a used condom after a one-night stand. The male lead character finds out years later as he is contacted by child support agency.

The CW television series Jane the Virgin centers around a young woman whose life is changed when she is accidentally impregnated with a man's sperm sample by mistake. The series later had an incident of sperm stealing.

Episodes of CSI: Crime Scene Investigation, The Young and the Restless, Archer, Bored to Death, Sunset Beach, Boston Legal, You're the Worst, Being Mary Jane, Neighbours, Bridgerton, Diagnosis Murder, Passions, Days of Our Lives, All My Children, The Game, Creamerie, Ray Donovan, The Good Wife, Hannibal, The Cleveland Show, and Law and Order: Special Victims Unit have also featured sperm theft storylines.

In Batman comics, some versions of the Damian Wayne backstory imply that he was conceived as a result of Bruce Wayne being drugged by Talia al Ghul.

In John Irving's The World According to Garp, Garp is born as a result of his mother raping a brain-damaged soldier in a field hospital.

In the independent film Your Sister's Sister, the lesbian character seduces a friend, whom she does not realize is her sister's love interest, using a broken condom to impregnate her.

In One Battle After Another, the white supremacist Colonel Steven Lockjaw tries to excuse his paternity of a biracial daughter by falsely claiming he was drugged and "raped in reverse" by a black woman.

== See also ==
- Fertility fraud
- Paper abortion
- Men's rights movement
- Non-consensual condom removal
- Posthumous sperm retrieval
- Pregnancy from rape
- Reproductive rights
- Hermesmann v. Seyer
- Rape of males
