= Ariel Rauschenberger =

Argentine politician

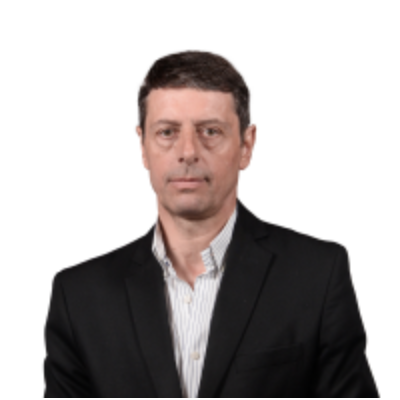

National Deputy
- Incumbent
- Assumed office 10 December 2023
- Constituency: La Pampa
- In office 10 December 2017 – 10 December 2021
- Constituency: La Pampa

Provincial Deputy of La Pampa
- In office 10 December 2015 – 10 December 2017

Personal details
- Born: 26 April 1966 (age 60) Bernasconi, La Pampa Province, Argentina
- Party: Justicialist Party
- Other political affiliations: Front for Victory (2003–2017); Frente de Todos (2019–present)
- Education: National University of La Pampa

Ariel Rauschenberger (born 26 April 1966) is an Argentine politician who serves as a National Deputy elected La Pampa since 2023, having previously held the position from 2017 to 2021. He belongs to the Justicialist Party.

Rauschenberger served in a number of posts in the provincial government of La Pampa, including as Treasurer General from 1991 to 1991, Minister of Treasury and Finances from 2007 to 2011 and Minister of Government Coordination from 2012 to 2015. He was also a member of the provincial Chamber of Deputies from 2015 to 2017.

== Early and personal life ==
Rauschenberger was born on 26 April 1966 in Bernasconi, a small town in the Hucal Department of La Pampa Province. His father, a member of the Justicialist Party, served as intendente (mayor) of Bernasconi. Rauschenberger studied accountancy at the National University of La Pampa, graduating in 1991. He is married and has one child.

== Political career ==
Rauschenberger's first political post was as Treasurer General of La Pampa Province, having been appointed in December 1991 under Governor Rubén Marín. He was still a university student; he was selected by then-treasury minister, Osvaldo Dadone, because he had the highest average grade of his class. In 1994, Rauschenberger was appointed Secretary of the Treasury and Vice Minister of Economy, and he remained in the post during the governorship of Carlos Verna.

In 2007, Governor Oscar Jorge appointed Rauschenberger as Minister of the Treasury and Finances; he served in that post until 2011. Later, from 2012 to 2015, he served as Minister of Government Coordination.

In 2015, Rauschenberger ran for a seat in the Chamber of Deputies of La Pampa, the unicameral legislature of the province. He was the fourteenth candidate in the Justicialist Party list, which received 48.60% of the vote, enough for Rauschenberger to be elected.

=== National Deputy ===
At the 2017 legislative election, Rauschenberger was the first candidate in the Justicialist Party list to the Chamber of Deputies, alongside Melina Delú. The list was the most voted with 45.42% of the vote, and Rauschenberger was elected. He was sworn in on 6 December 2017.

As a national deputy, Rauschenberger formed part of the parliamentary commissions on Economy, Regional Economies and Development, Commerce, Agriculture and Livestock, Budget and Treasury, Science, Technology and Productive Innovation, and Consumer Rights. Rauschenberger was a supporter of the legalization of abortion in Argentina. He voted in favor of the two Voluntary Interruption of Pregnancy bills that were debated by the Argentine Congress in 2018 and 2020, although he initially planned to vote against the first bill, in 2018. Then deputy-Sergio Ziliotto (who was later elected Governor of La Pampa) is widely credited for having convinced Rauschenberger to change his mind.

Ahead of the 2021 primary election, Rauschenberger was confirmed as one of the candidates for re-election in the Frente de Todos list in La Pampa.
