= Sergio Ziliotto =

Argentine politician

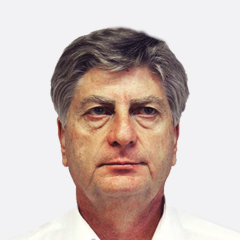

Governor of La Pampa
- Incumbent
- Assumed office 10 December 2019
- Vice Governor: Mariano Fernández
- Preceded by: Carlos Verna

National Deputy
- In office 10 December 2015 – 10 December 2019
- Constituency: La Pampa

Minister of Social Welfare of La Pampa
- In office 31 May 2006 – 10 December 2007
- Governor: Carlos Verna
- Preceded by: Rodolfo Mauricio Gazia
- Succeeded by: Gustavo Fernández Mandía

Personal details
- Born: 24 September 1962 (age 64) General Pico, La Pampa Province, Argentina
- Party: Justicialist Party
- Education: National University of La Pampa

Sergio Raúl Ziliotto (born 24 September 1962) is an Argentine Justicialist Party politician who is currently governor of La Pampa Province, since 10 December 2019. Previously, from 2015 to 2019, he was a National Deputy for La Pampa.

== Early life and education ==
Sergio Raúl Ziliotto was born on 24 September 1962 in General Pico, La Pampa Province. His father, son of immigrants, was a policeman, and also worked as a trucker. He moved to the provincial capital, Santa Rosa, to enroll at the National University of La Pampa (UNLPam). It was there that he began his political activism in the local chapter of the Peronist Youth.

== Political career ==
Ziliotto was appointed director of transport by then-governor Rubén Marín in 1991. Under the governorship of Carlos Verna, he was appointed Undersecretary of Social Policy in 2003 and then Minister of Social Welfare in 2006. As minister, Ziliotto designed the "Plan Piquén", which reformed the existing social assistance scheme in the province and introduced a debit card-based welfare scheme.

He was elected to the Argentine Chamber of Deputies in 2015, where he formed part of the Justicialist bloc. As a national deputy, Ziliotto gained national recognition in 2018 when, following Verna's instructions, he successfully lobbied two of his fellow Justicialist deputies from La Pampa (Melina Delú and Ariel Rauschenberger) to change their mind and vote in favor of the Voluntary Termination of Pregnancy bill at the last minute.

=== Governor of La Pampa ===
Ahead of the 2019 general election, incumbent governor Carlos Verna announced he would not be seeking the re-election due to his ongoing battle with cancer. Instead, Verna nominated Ziliotto to run in the Justicialist Front list. He won the election with 51% of the vote. As governor, he caused controversy when he stated in a press conference during which he was announcing the province's COVID-19 containment measures that "Argentina has [far too many] porteños", when asked about the protests against lockdown measures in Buenos Aires.

== Personal life ==
Ziliotto is an avid football fan; in his youth he played for the Club Atlético Costa Brava, a local club in General Pico.

Political offices
Preceded by Carlos Verna	Governor of La Pampa; 2019–present	Incumbent
