= Oscar Jorge =

Argentine politician (1936–2025)

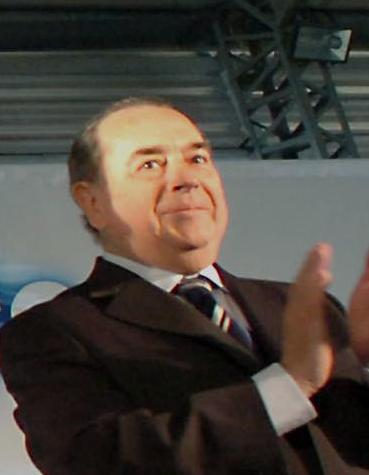

Governor of La Pampa
- In office 10 December 2007 – 10 December 2015
- Vice Governor: Luis Campo (2007–11); Norma Durango (2011–15)
- Preceded by: Carlos Verna
- Succeeded by: Carlos Verna

Mayor of Santa Rosa
- In office 1991–2003

Personal details
- Born: 14 July 1936 Caleufú, La Pampa, Argentina
- Died: 7 July 2025 (aged 88)
- Party: Justicialist Party
- Profession: Public accountant

Oscar Mario Jorge (Spanish: [osˈkaɾ ˈmaɾjo ˈxoɾxe]; 14 July 1936 – 7 July 2025) was an Argentine Justicialist Party politician who served as governor of La Pampa Province from 2007 to 2015.

== Life and career ==
Born in Caleufú, La Pampa Province, Jorge enrolled at the National University of La Pampa, and earned a degree in Accountancy. He taught in the discipline from 1965 to 1986, and served as Comptroller of the Province from 1973 to 1976.

Jorge was appointed provincial Economy Minister by governor Rubén Marín in 1983, serving until 1989, and was named Rector of the National University of La Pampa. He was elected as Mayor of Santa Rosa, capital of La Pampa, in 1991, and served for three consecutive terms until 2003. He was then appointed President of the Bank of La Pampa.

In 2007, Jorge beat his former mentor Rubén Marín in the Justicialist primary for the governorship of La Pampa. He was elected, besting Radical Senator Juan Carlos Marino, and again defeated Marino for re-election in 2011.

Jorge died on 7 July 2025, at the age of 88.

Preceded by Carlos Verna	Governor of La Pampa; 2007–2015	Succeeded by Carlos Verna
