= Melina Delú =

Argentine politician (born 1976)

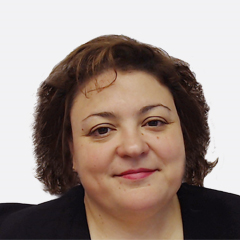

National Deputy
- In office 10 December 2017 – 10 December 2021
- Constituency: La Pampa

Personal details
- Born: 18 June 1976 (age 50) General Pico, Argentina
- Party: Justicialist Party
- Other political affiliations: Front for Victory (2003–2017); Frente de Todos (2019–present)
- Education: University of Belgrano

Melina Aída Delú (born 18 June 1976) is an Argentine politician who served as a National Deputy elected in La Pampa from 2017 to 2021. A member of the Justicialist Party, Delú sat in the Frente de Todos parliamentary bloc from 2019 to 2021.

Delú previously worked in Provincial Housing Institute of La Pampa, from 2007 to 2017. She also served as Director of the Casa de La Pampa, the province's "cultural embassy" in Buenos Aires.

== Early life and education ==
Delú was born on 18 June 1976 in General Pico, La Pampa Province. She comes from a political family, as her parents were both politically active, and her grandfather served as Secretary General of the General Confederation of Labour. She studied International Relations at the University of Belgrano, graduating in 1998.

Delú is married to Gustavo Martín.

== Political career ==
Delú worked as a legislative aide at the office of Senator Carlos Verna (who would later go on to be elected governor of La Pampa) from 1996 to 2003. In 2003, she was appointed Executive Director of the Casa de La Pampa, the province's "cultural embassy" in Buenos Aires. From 2007 to 2017, she worked at the Provincial Institute of Housing of La Pampa.

At the 2017 legislative election, Delú was the second candidate in the Justicialist Party list to the Chamber of Deputies, behind Ariel Rauschenberger. The list was the most voted with 45.42% of the vote, and both Rauschenberger and Delú were elected. She was sworn in on 6 December 2017.

As a national deputy, Delú formed part of the parliamentary commissions on Internal Security, Foreign Affairs, Education, Disabilities, and Housing and Urban Planning. She was a supporter of the legalization of abortion in Argentina. She voted in favour of the two Voluntary Interruption of Pregnancy bills that were debated by the Argentine Congress in 2018 and 2020, although she initially planned to vote against the first bill, in 2018. Then deputy-Sergio Ziliotto (who was later elected Governor of La Pampa) is widely credited for having convinced Delú to change her mind.

Ahead of the 2021 primary election, Delú was confirmed as one of the alternate candidates to the National Senate on the Frente de Todos list in La Pampa.
