= Martín Berhongaray =

Argentine politician (born 1978)

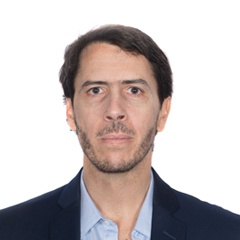

National Deputy
- Incumbent
- Assumed office 10 December 2019
- Constituency: La Pampa

Provincial Deputy of La Pampa
- In office 10 December 2007 – 10 December 2019

Personal details
- Born: 6 March 1978 (age 48) Santa Rosa, Argentina
- Party: Radical Civic Union
- Other political affiliations: Juntos por el Cambio (2015–present)
- Education: Argentine Catholic University

Martín Antonio Berhongaray (born 6 March 1978), is an Argentine politician, currently serving as National Deputy elected in La Pampa since 2019. He is a member of the Radical Civic Union (UCR). Berhongaray previously served as a member of La Pampa's provincial legislature, and as president of the UCR Committee of Santa Rosa.

== Early life and education ==
Berhongaray was born on 6 March 1978 in the capital of La Pampa Province, Santa Rosa. His father was Antonio Berhongaray (1942–2017), a prominent Radical Civic Union politician who was a National Senator for La Pampa and served as Secretary of Agriculture during the presidency of Fernando de la Rúa. His mother, Delia Braun de Berhongaray, was also active in politics and served in the Provincial Chamber of Deputies in 2003.

Berhongaray studied law at the Pontifical Catholic University of Argentina. He is married and has two children.

== Political career ==
Berhongaray was elected to the Provincial Chamber of Deputies in 2007, and was re-elected in 2011 and 2015. He was also president of the Radical Civic Union Committee of Santa Rosa.

Berhongaray headed one of the UCR lists in the Cambiemos P.A.S.O. primaries ahead of the 2017 Chamber of Deputies election, but lost to the PRO list, headed by Martín Maquieyra.

In the 2019 legislative election, Berhongaray ran in the Juntos por el Cambio list to the Chamber of Deputies in La Pampa as the first candidate. The Juntos por el Cambio list was the second-most voted, with 39.42% of the vote, enough for just Berhongaray to be elected.

As a national deputy, Berhongaray formed part of the parliamentary commissions on Natural Resources, Energy and Fuels, Elderly People, and Communications. He was an opponent of the 2020 Voluntary Interruption of Pregnancy bill, which legalized abortion in Argentina.
