= GPO =

GPO may refer to:

== Government and politics ==
- United States Government Publishing Office
- Government Press Office (Israel)
- General Post Office, United Kingdom
- General Post Office, Dublin
- Social Security Government Pension Offset, a provision reducing benefits
- Government Pharmaceutical Organization, a Thai state enterprise
- Green Party of Ontario, Canada
- Group purchasing organization, a type of business consortium

== Places ==
- Guam Premier Outlets, a shopping mall in Guam
- Indore G.P.O., a residential area in Indore, India
- General Pico Airport (IATA code: GPO)
- Gospel Oak railway station (National Rail code: GPO)

== Science and technology ==
- Giant Pacific Octopus
- Group Policy Object
- General Purpose Outlet, the mains socket in Australia
- General-purpose output, an uncommitted digital signal pin on an integrated circuit or electronic circuit board used as an output and controllable by the user at runtime

== Other uses ==
- Generalplan Ost, a Nazi plan for genocide in Eastern Europe
- Gun Position Officer, a lieutenant responsible for the technical control of an artillery battery in the United Kingdom and Commonwealth forces
- General Post Office (disambiguation)
