= Quetrequén =

Coordinates: 35°03′S 64°32′W

- Rural locality and village
- Interactive map of Quetrequén
- Country: Argentina
- Province: La Pampa Province
- Department: Rancul Department
- Foundation: 15 October 1904
- Elevation: 620 ft (190 m)

Population (2010)
  - Total: 392
- Time zone: UTC−3 (ART)
- Area code: 02302

Quetrequén is a village and rural locality (municipality) in the Rancul Department of La Pampa Province in Argentina.
