= Norma Durango =

Argentine politician (born 1952)

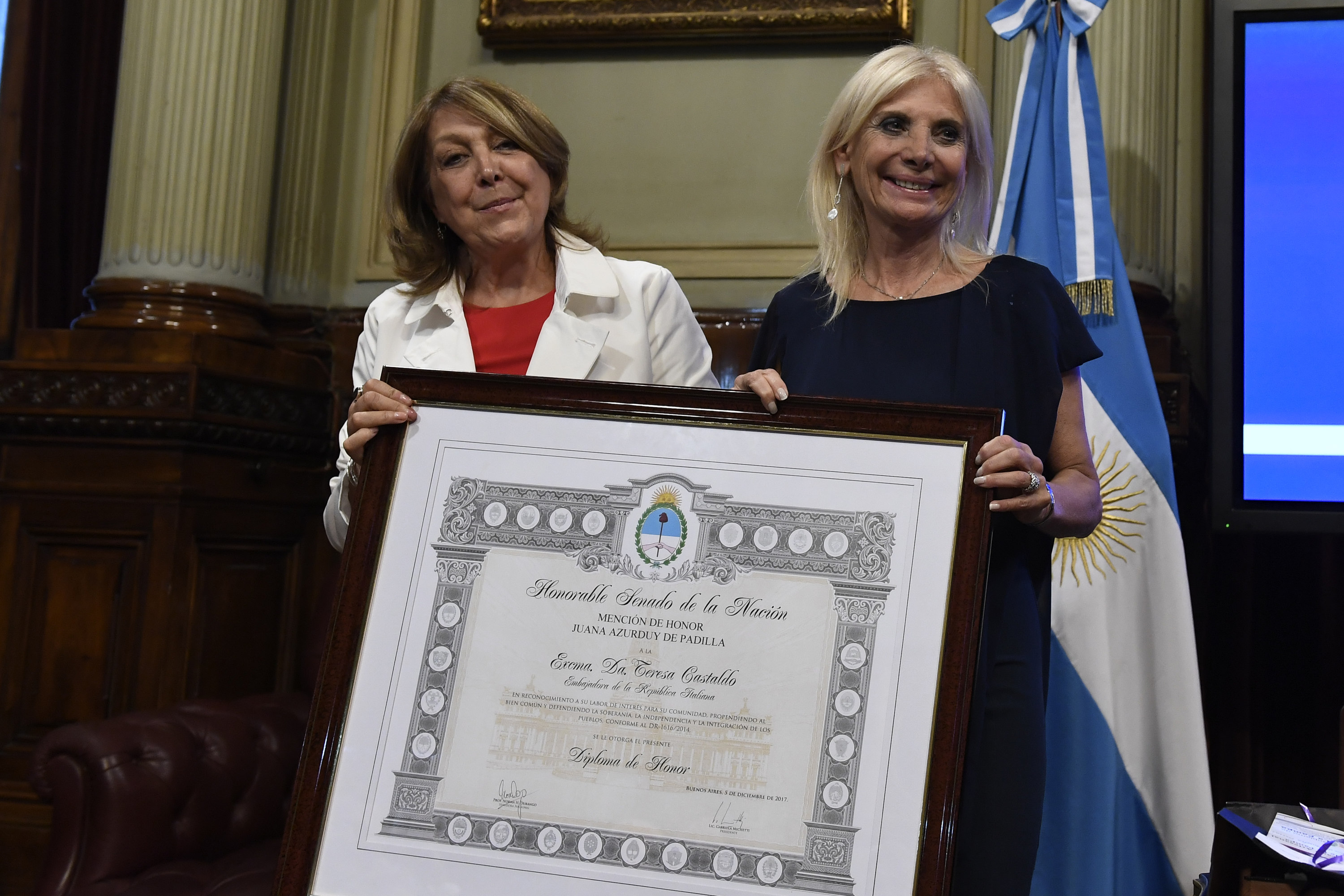

National Senator
- In office 10 December 2015 – 10 December 2021
- Constituency: La Pampa

Vice Governor of La Pampa
- In office 10 December 2011 – 10 December 2015
- Governor: Oscar Jorge
- Preceded by: Luis Alberto Campo
- Succeeded by: Mariano Fernández
- In office 10 December 2003 – 10 December 2007
- Governor: Carlos Verna
- Preceded by: Heriberto Mediza
- Succeeded by: Luis Alberto Campo

Personal details
- Born: 20 November 1952 (age 73) Doblas, La Pampa Province, Argentina
- Party: Justicialist Party
- Education: National University of La Pampa

Norma Haydée Durango (born 20 November 1952) is an Argentine politician who was a National Senator for La Pampa Province from 2015 to 2021. She previously served as Vice Governor of La Pampa under Governor Oscar Jorge from 2011 to 2015 and under Governor Carlos Verna from 2003 to 2007. She belongs to the Justicialist Party.

== Early life and education ==
Norma Haydée Durango was born on 20 November 1952 in Doblas, a rural community in the Atreucó Department of La Pampa Province. She studied to be a teacher at the National University of La Pampa (UNLPam). As a student at the Faculty of Human Sciences of the UNLPam, she co-authored a bibliographical index of authors from La Pampa in 1982.

== Political career ==
Durango was twice Vice Governor of La Pampa: first under Carlos Verna from 2003 to 2007, and then under Oscar Jorge from 2011 to 2015.

Durango was the second candidate on the Front for Victory list to the Argentine Senate alongside Daniel Lovera at the 2015 legislative election; the list won 45.85% and Durango was comfortably elected. She was sworn in on 4 December 2015. She presides the Senate commission on women.

A longstanding supporter of women's reproductive rights and the legalisation of abortion in Argentina, Durango voted in favour of the Voluntary Interruption of Pregnancy Bill introduced in 2018, and is a supporter of the similar bill brought forward by President Alberto Fernández in 2020.
