= Rancul Department =

Department of Argentina in La Pampa Province

Coordinates: 35.0681°S 64.6839°W

- Department
- Location of Rancul Department within La Pampa Province
- Country: Argentina
- Province: La Pampa
- Capital: Parera

Area
  - Total: 4,933 km^{2} (1,905 sq mi)

Population (2022)
  - Total: 11,133
  - Density: 2.257/km^{2} (5.845/sq mi)
- Time zone: ART

Rancul Department is a department of Argentina in La Pampa Province. The capital city of the department is Parera.

== See also ==
- Caleufú - town
- Ingeniero Foster - village
- La Maruja - village
- Quetrequén - village
