= Lucaioli =

Defunct Argentine electronics retailer

Lucaioli was an Argentine electronics retailer founded and headquartered in Bahía Blanca. It was operational between 1961 and 2019, with stores in several Argentine provinces.

== History ==
It was established in 1961 by Humberto Lucaioli, which at its apex in the 2000s not only had stores in Buenos Aires Province, but also the provinces of Argentine Patagonia. In 2007, Ribeiro was nearing an acquisition of Lucaioli, in which it would become a minority shareholder. The company acquired Saturno Hogar in 2013. The company announced in April 2017 not to deliver personal information to avoid data breaches by scammers.

Beginning in 2016, the company decided to cut costs by firing 75 of its staff. In 2017, it closed its store in Bariloche, firing all of its employees. It had also reported similar acts in Trelew and Santa Rosa. In 2018, the store in Bahía Blanca fired 60 people. The amount of staff fired in its last year led to the gradual closure of several of its remaining stores. By April 2019, only 480 staff remained, 130 of which in Bahía Blanca, who feared for their rights. At the same time, the company announced the closure of all of its stores without prior warning, which was initially meant to be temporary, per a message posted on its website.

Reports emerged in the Patagonian stores that there was a possible acquisition by an investment group. Official reports said that the situation at Lucaioli had nothing to do with the Argentine economic crisis. Between May 9 and May 24, its staff announced a sale in the Bahía Blanca store to prevent the degradation of the company. Finally, on October 1, 2019, the company was declared insolvent.

As late as February 2023, its staff had entire years of unpaid salaries and had not reclaimed their rights. On March 27, the remaining assets of the Río Gallegos store were auctioned off. Later that year, the company announced its final liquidation. Some of its staff had been working under precarious conditions prior to its closure.
