= Parera =

- Town
- Flag Coat of arms
- Interactive map of Parera
- Coordinates: 35°07′0″S 64°17′0″W
- Country: Argentina
- Province: La Pampa
- Department: Rancul
- Founded: 21 July 1898

Government
  - Intendant: Diego Marcantonio

Area
  - Total: 170 sq mi (450 km^{2})

Population (2010)
  - Total: 2,030
  - Density: 11.7/sq mi (4.51/km^{2})
- Time zone: UTC−3 (ART)

Parera is a town in La Pampa Province in Argentina.
