= La Maruja =

Coordinates: 35°40′S 64°58′W

- Rural locality and village
- Interactive map of La Maruja
- Country: Argentina
- Province: La Pampa Province
- Department: Rancul Department
- Founded: 28 October 1928

Area
  - Total: 1,160 km^{2} (450 sq mi)
- Elevation: 275 m (902 ft)

Population (2010)
  - Total: 1,168
- Time zone: UTC−3 (ART)
- Postal code: L6385
- Area code: 02335

La Maruja is a village and rural locality (municipality) in the Rancul Department of La Pampa Province in Argentina. It is named after the daughter of the original owner of the land.

Nearby villages include Ingeniero Foster.
