= Ingeniero Foster =

Coordinates: 35°42′S 65°05′W

- Rural locality and village
- Interactive map of Ingeniero Foster
- Country: Argentina
- Province: La Pampa Province
- Department: Rancul Department
- Foundation: 20 September 1910

Area
  - Total: 525 km^{2} (203 sq mi)
- Elevation: 292 m (958 ft)

Population (2010)
  - Total: 52
- Time zone: UTC−3 (ART)
- Postal code: 6385
- Area code: 02335

Ingeniero Foster is a village and rural locality (municipality) in the Rancul Department of La Pampa Province in Argentina. The nearest towns are La Maruja and Arizona in San Luis Province.
