= Maracó Department =

Coordinates: 35.6525°S 63.7581°W

- Department
- Location of Maracó Department within La Pampa Province
- Country: Argentina
- Province: La Pampa
- Capital: General Pico

Area
  - Total: 2,555 km^{2} (986 sq mi)

Population (2022)
  - Total: 69,514
  - Density: 27.21/km^{2} (70.47/sq mi)
- Time zone: ART

Maracó Department is a department of Argentina in La Pampa Province. The capital city of the department is General Pico.

== Population ==
In the 2010 Census, the Department of Maracó had a population of 59,024 inhabitants, of which 28,879 were male and 30,145 were female. The male-to-female ratio of the Maracó Department was 95.8 males per 100 females, the second lowest in the Province of La Pampa after the Capital Department.

According to the 2022 Census it has 70 156 inhabitants (Indec, 2022).
