= Chamber of Deputies of La Pampa =

Legislative body of La Pampa Province, Argentina

Type
- Type: Unicameral

Leadership
- President (Vice Governor): Mariano Fernández (FJP) since 10 December 2019
- First Vice President: Alicia Susana Mayoral (FJP) since 10 December 2019
- Second Vice President: Estela Maris Guzmán (UCR) since 10 December 2019

Structure
- Seats: 30 legislators
- Political groups: Government (17): Pampean Justicialist Front (17); Opposition (13): Radical Civic Union (7); Federal Proposal (4); Organised Community (1); Pampean Productive Movement (1)
- Length of term: 4 years
- Authority: Constitution of La Pampa

Elections
- Voting system: Proportional representation
- Last election: 19 May 2019
- Next election: 2023

Meeting place
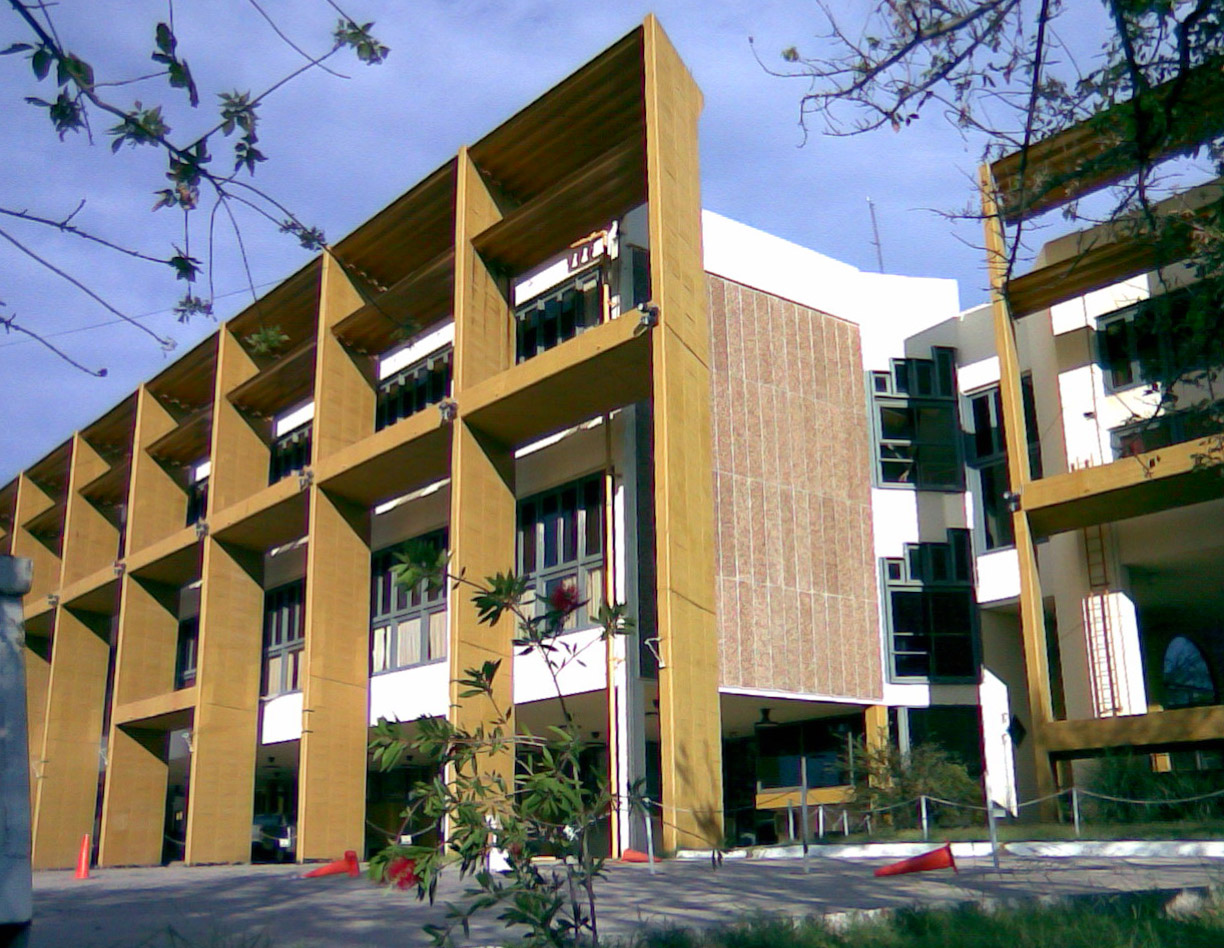
- Centro Cívico, Santa Rosa, La Pampa

Website
- camaradediputados.lapampa.gob.ar

The Chamber of Deputies of La Pampa Province (Spanish: Cámara de Diputados de la Provincia de La Pampa) is the unicameral legislative body of La Pampa Province, in Argentina. It convenes in the provincial capital, Santa Rosa.

It comprises 30 legislators, elected in a single multi-member district through proportional representation every four years. Elections employ the D'Hondt system and a 3% electoral threshold.

Its powers and responsibilities are established in the provincial constitution. The legislature is presided by the Vice Governor of La Pampa (presently Mariano Fernández of the Pampean Justicialist Front), who is elected alongside the governor.

== History ==
The Legislature of La Pampa was established after the National Territory of La Pampa became an official province of Argentina, under the name of "Eva Perón Province". The 1951 constituent assembly, which wrote and adopted the first constitution of Eva Perón Province, mandated the election of a provincial Chamber of Representatives, with 21 members elected in single-member constituencies which were designed especially for the legislative body. The chamber convened for the first time on 4 June 1953, in the municipal building of Santa Rosa.

== Seat ==
The Chamber of Deputies convenes in the Centro Cívico complex, in the provincial capital of Santa Rosa. The governor's offices, as well as provincial courts and other government offices all have its headquarters in the Centro Cívico as well. The entire complex was designed by Italian-Argentine architect Clorindo Testa. The Chamber of Deputies building was completed in 1976, during the second stage of construction.

The complex was designed in the brutalist style, with influences from Le Corbusier's 1953 Secretariat Building, in Chandigarh. In 2006, an annex for the Chamber of Deputies Library, also designed by Testa, was completed.
