= Capital Department, La Pampa =

Capital Departamento Capital
- Department
- Country: Argentina
- Seat: Santa Rosa

Area
  - Total: 2,525 km^{2} (975 sq mi)

Population (2022)
  - Total: 119,632
  - Density: 47.38/km^{2} (122.7/sq mi)

Capital is a department of the province of La Pampa (Argentina).
