= Caleufú =

- Town
- Caleufú in Argentina
- Coordinates: 35°35′40″S 64°33′31″W
- Country: Argentina
- Province: La Pampa Province
- Department: Rancul Department

Area
  - Land: 170 sq mi (450 km^{2})
- Elevation: 584 ft (178 m)
- Time zone: UTC−3 (ART)

Caleufú is a town in Rancul Department of La Pampa Province in Argentina.
