= Carlos Verna =

Argentine politician

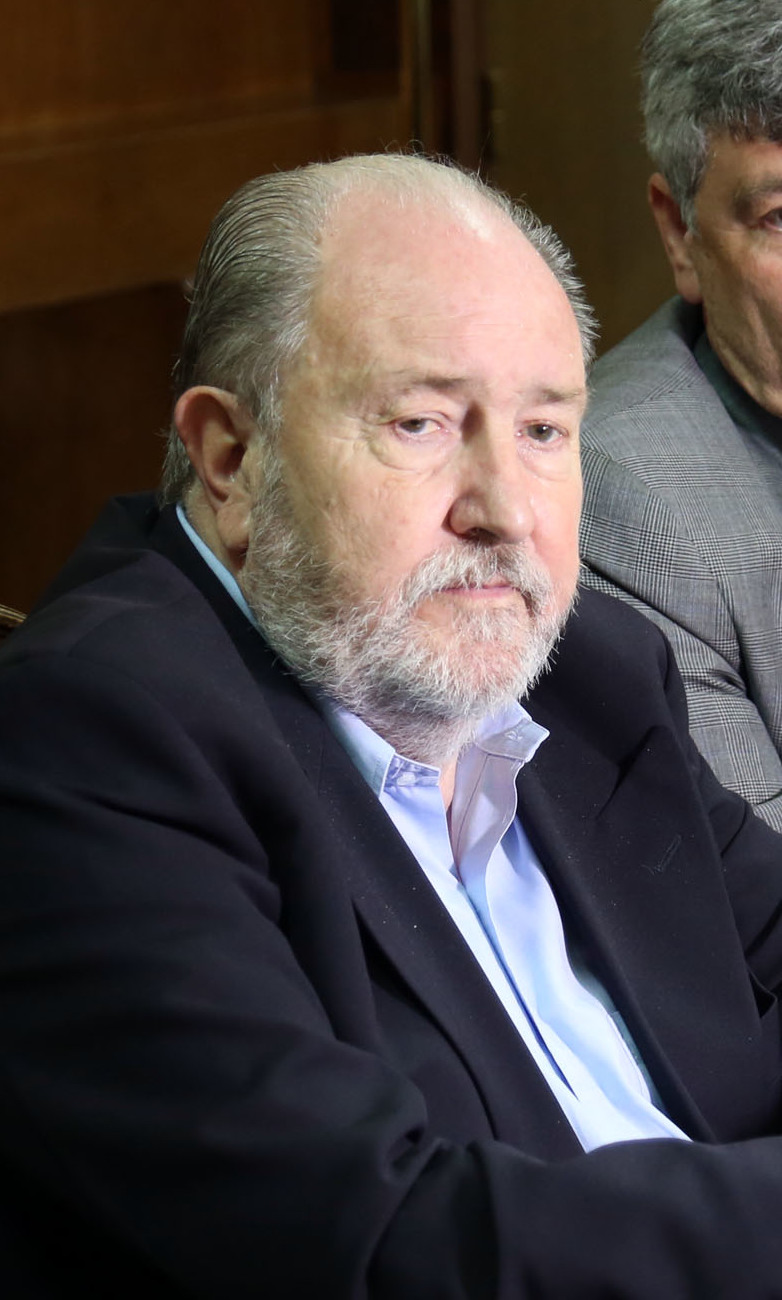
- Carlos Verna in 2017

Governor of La Pampa
- In office 10 December 2015 – 10 December 2019
- Vice Governor: Mariano Fernández
- Preceded by: Oscar Mario Jorge
- Succeeded by: Sergio Ziliotto
- In office 10 December 2003 – 10 December 2007
- Vice Governor: Norma Durango
- Preceded by: Rubén Marín
- Succeeded by: Oscar Mario Jorge

National Senator
- In office 10 December 2009 – 10 December 2015
- Constituency: La Pampa
- In office 21 April 1993 – 10 December 2003
- Constituency: La Pampa

Mayor of General Pico
- In office 10 December 1987 – 10 December 1993

Personal details
- Born: 8 May 1946 (age 80) América, Buenos Aires Province, Argentina
- Party: Justicialist Party
- Profession: Engineer

Carlos Alberto Verna (born 8 May 1946) is an Argentine Justicialist Party (PJ) politician who was governor of La Pampa Province twice, from 2003 to 2007 and from 2015 to 2019. He was also a National Senator for La Pampa for two terms, and served as intendente (mayor) of General Pico.

== Career ==
Verna entered public service as Mayor of General Pico, and was elected to the Argentine Senate for La Pampa in 1993, and later became Chairman of the Budget Committee. He won the 2003 gubernatorial election with the support of President Carlos Menem, against the candidate of the Front for Victory faction of the Justicialist Party, Néstor Ahuad. Verna was not close to fellow Peronist President Néstor Kirchner, and was likely to be challenged by his own party if he attempted to be re-elected in 2007. He was, moreover, implicated in the scandal concerning public SIDE funds diverted to senators by the government of Fernando de la Rúa for their support of a labor law flexibilization bill in 2000. Consequently, Verna declared he would not seek political office following the end of his term in 2007, and he left office in December 2007.

Verna was returned to his former seat in the Senate in 2009; he campaigned with markedly anti-Kirchnerist rhetoric in the heavily agrarian province (then still reeling from the effects of the 2008 Argentine government conflict with the agricultural sector, as well as a severe drought). Maintaining long-standing differences with President Cristina Kirchner from her days in the Senate, Verna voted against the use of Central Bank reserves for foreign debt retirement.

He ran for a new term as governor of La Pampa in 2015. He first defeated the Kirchnerite Fabián Bruna, proposed by the governor Oscar Jorge for the primary elections.

He announced in September 2018 that he was diagnosed with prostate cancer. He said that he would not run for reelection in 2019 and leave politics. He also said that he had no intention to stay until the end of his term of office, but that he may resign if his condition gets worse.

Preceded by Rubén Marín	Governor of La Pampa; 2003–2007	Succeeded by Oscar Mario Jorge
Preceded by Oscar Mario Jorge	Governor of La Pampa; 2015–2019	Succeeded by Sergio Ziliotto
