= Néstor Ahuad =

Argentine politician (1940–2016)

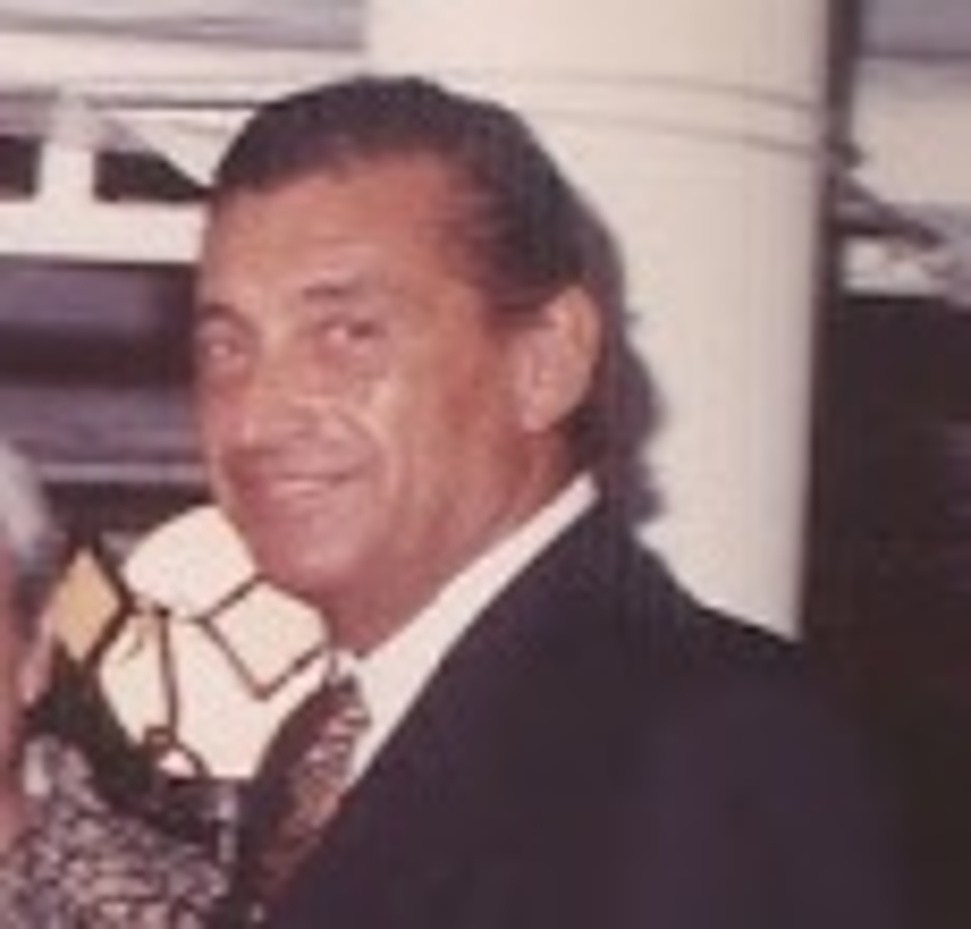
- Néstor Ahuad

Governor of La Pampa Province
- In office 10 December 1987 – 9 December 1991
- Lieutenant: Edén Cavallero
- Preceded by: Rubén Marín
- Succeeded by: Rubén Marín

Personal details
- Born: 7 April 1940; La Paz, Entre Ríos
- Died: 1 October 2016 (aged 76); Buenos Aires
- Political party: Justicialist Party

Néstor Ahuad (7 April 1940 – 1 October 2016) was an Argentine politician who served as governor of La Pampa Province from 1987 to 1991.
