= General Pico Airport =

Airport in Argentina

General Pico Airport Aeropuerto de General Pico
- IATA: GPO; ICAO: SAZG

Summary
- Airport type: Public
- Serves: General Pico, Argentina
- Elevation AMSL: 459 ft / 140 m
- Coordinates: 35°41′45″S 63°45′30″W

Map
- Location of the airport in Argentina

Runways
Direction	Length		Surface
Direction	m	ft	Surface
16/34	2,400	7,874	Asphalt
- Source: SkyVector Google Maps GCM

General Pico Airport (Spanish: Aeropuerto de General Pico) (IATA: GPO, ICAO: SAZG) is an airport serving General Pico, a town in the La Pampa Province of Argentina. The airport is 2 kilometres (1 mi) south of General Pico.

Runway length includes a 305 metres (1,001 ft) displaced threshold on Runway 34.

The General Pico VOR-DME and non-directional beacon (Idents: GPI) are located on the field.

== See also ==
- Transport in Argentina
- List of airports in Argentina
