= Indore G.P.O. =

- suburb
- Location in Madhya Pradesh, India
- Coordinates: 22.42°N 75.54°E
- Country: India
- State: Madhya Pradesh
- District: Indore

Population (2010)
  - Total: 25,000

Languages
  - Official: Hindi
- Time zone: UTC+5:30 (IST)
- PIN: 452001
- Telephone code: 0731
- Vehicle registration: 09
- Nearest city: Indore

Indore G.P.O. commonly known as G.P.O. or G.P.O. colony is a residential locality within the largest city and commercial hub Indore, Madhya Pradesh, India. The area is named after the main General Post Office of the Indore City. The Postal Code is 452001.

The elected Member of the Legislative Assembly from Indore-1 Assembly constituency in the 2023 Madhya Pradesh Legislative Assembly election is Kailash Vijayvargiya.

== Outlook ==
G.P.O. is known for its General Post Office and a mosque opposite to G.P.O. building.

== Locality ==
A lot of society are blooming up here along with hotels and motels. There are more than 6 sectors which houses 50 houses each

== Getting there ==
Bus routes: The Dewas–Pithampur bus service by pass whole Indore connects G.P.O. Besides this, many city bus service connects it to other localities of Indore.

- 001-Panchwati–Tejaji Nagar
- 002-
- 025-
