= Conference of Governors of National Territories (Argentina) =

The Conference of the Governors of National Territories of the Argentine Republic is the space for deliberation and institutional agreement of officials in charge of governing national territories.

== Introduction ==
In 1913, following an initiative of the General Directorate of National Territories, the First Conference of Governors of National Territories was held, with the aim of deliberating on the problems of these spaces and reaching a consensus on the proposal to reform the law on territories prepared by the Ministry of the Interior of the Argentine Nation.

Until the Centenary of the May Revolution, national territories were created as political-administrative entities dependent on the central power, with little or no participation in decision-making that directly affected their interests. The right of representation had been repeatedly denied to them and the governors were considered mere executors of the current regulations, with little room for autonomy to propose individual initiatives or to dissent from any measure taken.

Certainly, according to Law No. 1532 of 1884, in order to establish a legislature, the territories had to have thirty thousand inhabitants and to be provincialized, sixty thousand. This quantitative provision of the law was never fulfilled during the long period of territorial organization.

Thus, the inhabitants of the national territories had all the obligations of citizens of the nation but their political rights were restricted. They could not participate in national elections and only exercised the right to vote in localities with more than a thousand inhabitants, where they elected a Municipal Council of five members and a justice of the peace.

Under the presidency of José Figueroa Alcorta, the government began to think of the territories in a more comprehensive way, with proposals that were much more articulated and adapted to reality, among which the Plan for the Promotion of National Territories, authored by the Minister of Agriculture and Public Works Ezequiel Ramos Mexía, stood out. This change in policy had its counterpart in the bureaucratic aspect. In 1912, the Ministry of the Interior of the Argentine Nation decided to create the General Directorate of National Territories, an office that was placed in the hands of the jurist and politician Isidoro Ruiz Moreno.

The 1913 Conference meant for the territories the opening of a space for participation and deliberation that, however, lacked continuity. Although congresses, conferences and meetings organised by specific organisations such as municipalities or the territorial press were subsequently held, the State did not call the governors of the national territories again until Peronism.

== Later evolution ==
The Conference format was framed within the context of the opening of the Centenary of the May Revolution. It was a novel event that was taken as a model for subsequent years, in which specific meetings were convened by sectoral organizations or groups of the territories: the Territorial Press Conference, held in Santa Rosa around 1917; the Conference of Delegates of the National Territories of 1922 convened by the Rural Society of Río Negro and Neuquén; the Congress of the Permanent Board for Parliamentary Representation of the National Territories of 1923, the Congress of the National Territories convened by the Argentine Patriotic League of 1927, the First and Second General Congress of Municipalities of the National Territories, held in Buenos Aires in 1933 and 1935; the General Congresses of the National Territories in 1939 and 1940, in which representatives of municipalities, development commissions, economic, trade and cultural associations participated; the First National Meeting of Municipalities, convened in 1945 by President Edelmiro Farrell and made up of delegates from the territories, among others.

As for the Conferences of Governors, there was a break in their convening until the 1940s, when President Juan Domingo Perón brought together the governors again in conferences held in 1947, 1949, 1950, 1951, 1952 and 1954, which were widely publicized and in which the President of the Argentine Nation personally participated - unlike in 1913.

However, the Conference format was not entirely new, since economic zones with specific problems also used this format to decide on actions in critical situations, as was the case of the provinces of northwestern Argentina -gathered in the face of the sugar crisis - in conferences of governors and businessmen in 1926 and 1927.

== The 1913 Conference ==
The reasons for the call for the Conference referred to the deficiencies in the organisation of the territories, with anachronistic regulations that required urgent reforms. The government believed that the governors were the ones who best knew this reality and could provide practical measures and solutions. Therefore, the Ministry of the Interior emphasised that it hoped that the Conference would constitute a fundamental milestone for the life of the national territories by enabling the changes that they required for their development.

The Conference of Governors met in Buenos Aires on March 10, 1913, and included fifteen public sessions and three secret ones, ending on April 5. The idea of bringing together, at the same time and place, governors and delegates from the portfolios and offices that were in charge of matters related to the ten existing national territories was materialized: Chaco, Misiones, Formosa, La Pampa, Río Negro, Neuquén, Chubut, Santa Cruz, Tierra del Fuego and Los Andes - which existed from 1900 to 1943, when it was divided between the provinces of Salta, Catamarca and Jujuy. Seventeen delegates from the Ministries of the Interior, Agriculture, Finance, Justice and Public Education, Public Works, War, Navy and the General Accounting Office of the Nation attended the event representing the national government. The meeting did not have an open agenda, but rather a programme pre-established by the Ministry of the Interior that included the issues considered most urgent: the draft organic law for the territories, the budget for 1914 and issues related to territorial division, communications, administration of public land, natural resources, navigation, accounting, police, alcoholism and prostitution.

This program left out important issues for the territories, originally contained in the Gallardo proposal, such as the reforms to the Rural Code of the Argentine Republic or the question of indigenous people. It also did not include aspects related to justice, immigration, education and work. In response to the complaint of the governor of Formosa Juan José Silva, the Minister of the Interior argued that these were issues that did not need to be included since there were previous essays and studies and specialized people who could give their opinion and that the inclusion of problems of this magnitude would unnecessarily prolong the debates.

However, there was no revision of the public land administration policies, which remained the exclusive and exclusive responsibility of the national State. Neither the 1884 Territory Law nor the Land Law No. 4167 and its regulatory decree of November 8, 1903, granted any authority to the governors over public land. On the contrary, the 1903 law reinforced this orientation and even eliminated the powers of the municipalities to grant land within their ejido, which caused multiple problems with the lands granted until then, leaving titles pending resolution for a long time.

The finally approved report suggested the convenience of entrusting the governors with the supervision of contracts on public land, the creation of the office for the processing of matters relating to public land and the power granted to the governors to grant occupation permits for a fee or precarious title for lands not offered for sale or lease.

== The conferences of governors during Peronism ==
The political rise of Juan D. Perón brought about significant changes in the traditional Fourteen Provinces, in force since the time of the Argentine Confederation, and altered the nature of political relations between the central government and the provincial governments. On the one hand, he expanded and consolidated the presence of the Nation State through a vast plan of public works, education and health care and institutional reforms aimed at homogenizing and integrating the territories into national problems. On the other hand, he favored the politicization of society and the centralization of political decisions in the "sole and natural national leader" of Peronism.

The recognition of political rights for the inhabitants of the national territories was formalized with the Argentine constitutional reform of 1949, whose text, in article 82, establishes the direct election of the presidential formula "for which purpose the provinces, the Federal Capital and the national territories would form a single district" and is extended to the general election of November 11, 1951.

Law No. 13,010 of 1947, which reformed the electoral system and incorporated women's suffrage, institutionalized the participation of the inhabitants of the national territories. In addition to the possibility of voting for the presidential ticket, there was the provincialization of Chaco and La Pampa; the right to elect a parliamentary delegate - with voice but no vote - the lifting of interventions in the communes - in force since 1943 - and the recognition of municipal rank to various development commissions.

Based on the idea that "every organization presupposes two things: the formation of all souls creating a collective soul that thinks congruently and acts congruently," Juan D. Perón called the governors of the provinces to "administrative meetings" that supposed a system of power based on a homogenized order to which they were integrated on equal terms with their peers, and which they could not challenge. From that perspective, for Perón the functions of government were well defined in the roles of "strategic leader" - the President of the Argentine Republic - and "tactical leader" - the provincial governor. The first had to be everywhere exercising the superior direction of the relations between the different sectors of the leadership; the second had to be in his singular and predetermined function geographically and institutionally. Any excess of functional action - for example, through a "league of governors" - constituted a dissociative factor of the political organization called Nation.

The old institution of federal intervention, now applied to provinces whose governments are part of Peronism, will be the legal resource to form a political organization with unified leadership, reducing or calming intra-party conflicts. Certainly, in a single act, Perón ordered the interventions in the provinces of Catamarca, La Rioja and Santiago del Estero by decree of January 28, 1948, arguing that, although there were formal legally constituted authorities, "the inharmonious development of their powers hinders the homogeneous and concordant action imposed by the current demands of the country." Thus, the interpreter of the popular mandate is the national government.

For its part, the interventions in the provincial judicial powers of Buenos Aires, Salta, Córdoba -whose peculiar characteristic is that it was requested from the National Executive Power by Governor Raúl Lucini during Conference of Governors VI in 1954-, Santa Fe, Tucumán and Santiago del Estero responded to the need to expand and protect the social rights of the citizen who, as a subject belonging to the national and homogeneous social fabric, is the bearer of a social right that cannot be limited, restricted or annulled by particular provisions of local authorities. In this sense, in the recitals of the federal intervention in the judicial power of Salta, by Decree No. 4600 of March 7, 1951 -B.O. 09/03/51-, it is read that "the anomalous situation" of said power prevented "the establishment of the labor jurisdiction", a jurisdiction that had the objective of "the correct application of the principles of social and labor law."

== The Federal Investment Council (CFI) ==
On August 29, 1959, by an agreement between the Provinces, the Municipality of the City of Buenos Aires and the then National Territory of Tierra del Fuego, Antarctica and the South Atlantic Islands, the Federal Investment Council was established "as a permanent research, coordination and advisory body, responsible for recommending the necessary measures for an adequate investment policy and a better use of the different economic means leading to the achievement of development based on decentralization" (Art. 1 of the Charter).

It is a federal agency for the promotion of economic activities in Argentina, which is financed with resources from the provinces, from the Federal Tax Sharing (Art. 15 of the Constitution). The highest body of the council is the Assembly of Governors (Art. 5 of the Constitution).

Except for the deliberation and agreement on the distribution guidelines contained in the Federal Tax Sharing, during the presidencies of Raúl Alfonsín and Fernando de la Rúa, when the majority of Argentine provinces were governed by Peronism, the CFI has not been a permanent area of political discussion.

During the brief administration of Fernando de la Rúa, for example, the CFI was the "tribune" from where the provincial leaders met to resist the cuts in public spending and investment from the Nation and to issue jointly, an Open Letter to the President of the Nation on April 25, 2000, questioning "the slowness in the implementation of the Commitment for the Effectiveness and Transparency of Social Spending" - signed in December 2000 - and denouncing that "the lack of economic reactivation, the fall in consumption aggravated by the increase in tax pressure, the paralysis of important infrastructure works and the non-compliance with the Federal Educational Pact, facilitate the growth of social tension."

Through the CFI, the governors agreed on distribution guidelines for the awarding of works under the Federal Infrastructure Plan - created by Decree of Necessity and Urgency No. 1299/00 - which established a plan for works to expand and maintain the national non-concessioned road network, for a five-year period and with the consensus of each of the provincial governments, prepared by the then Minister of Infrastructure and Housing, Nicolás Gallo.

== International associations of intermediate governments ==
However, in the absence of an institutionalized space for meeting and deliberation of the governors of the twenty-three Argentine provinces, there are international organizations, to which different Argentine provinces and municipalities have adhered, which bring together the so-called intermediate governments.

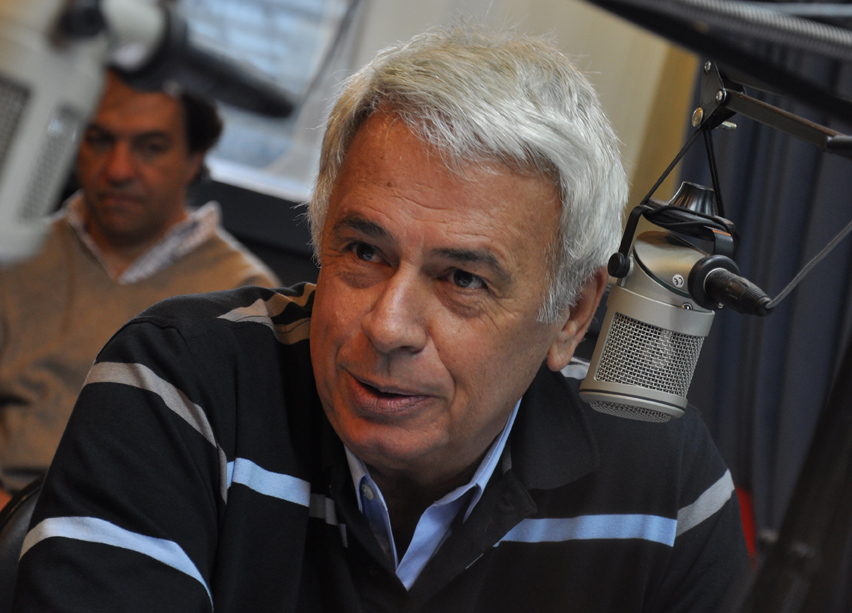
De la Sota during an interview in 2011.

Among the most important, the Latin American Organization of Intermediate Governments (OLAGI) created at the First Latin American Summit of Governors, Mayors, Prefects and Regional Presidents, held in Ecuador in 2004. This entity brings together the intermediate level governments in Latin American countries (subnational states, regions, departments and provinces). It is the associative body that acts as an interlocutor and liaison between intermediate governments, their national associations and international cooperation institutions, promoting interregional twinning.

== International background ==
- The Conference of Governors and the National Governors Association of the United States.
- Conferencia Nacional de Gobernadores (CONAGO) de Mexico.
