= Governor of La Pampa Province =

- Provincial coat of Arms

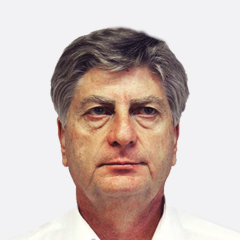
- Incumbent; Sergio Ziliotto since 10 December 2019
- Appointer: Direct popular vote
- Term length: 4 years
- Inaugural holder: Salvador Ananía

The Governor of La Pampa Province (Spanish: Gobernador de la Provincia de La Pampa) is a citizen of La Pampa Province, in Argentina, holding the office of governor for the corresponding term. The governor is elected alongside a vice-governor. Currently the governor of La Pampa is Sergio Ziliotto.

== Governors since 1983 ==
Governor	Term in office	Party	Election	Vice Governor
Rubén Marín	10 December 1983 – 10 December 1987	PJ	1983	Manuel Baladrón
Néstor Ahuad	10 December 1987 – 10 December 1991	PJ	1987	Edén Cavallero
Rubén Marín	10 December 1991 – 10 December 2003	PJ	1991	Manuel Baladrón
Rubén Marín	10 December 1991 – 10 December 2003	PJ	1995	Manuel Baladrón
Rubén Marín	10 December 1991 – 10 December 2003	PJ	1999	Heriberto Mediza
Carlos Verna	10 December 2003 – 10 December 2007	PJ	2003	Norma Durango
Oscar Jorge	10 December 2007 – 10 December 2015	PJ	2007	Luis Alberto Campo
Oscar Jorge	10 December 2007 – 10 December 2015	PJ	2011	Norma Durango
Carlos Verna	10 December 2015 – 10 December 2019	PJ	2015	Mariano Fernández
Sergio Ziliotto	10 December 2019 – Incumbent	PJ	2015	Mariano Fernández

== See also ==
- Chamber of Deputies of La Pampa
