= General Pico =

- City
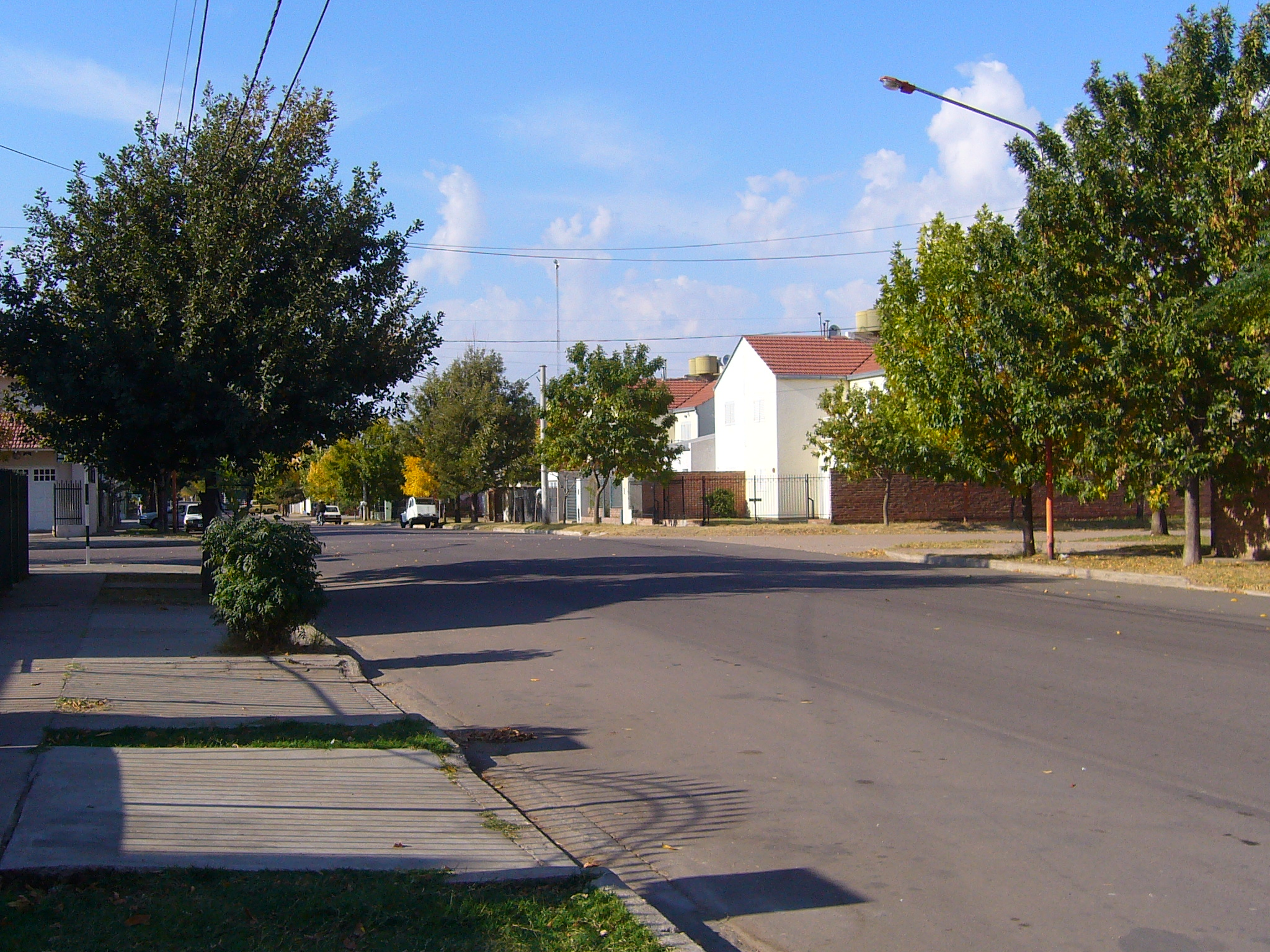
- Street of General Pico

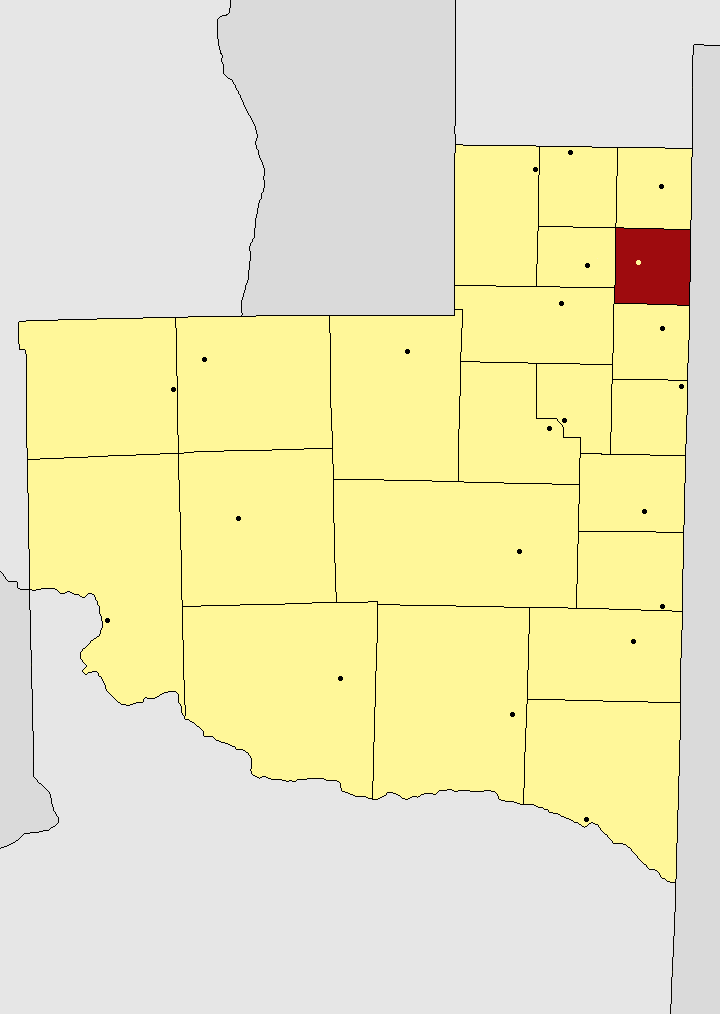
- Location in La Pampa Province

- Location within Argentina
- Coordinates: 35°40′0″S 63°44′0″W
- Country: Argentina
- Province: La Pampa
- Founded: 11 November 1905

Government
  - Intendant: Fernanda Alonso (PJ)
- Elevation: 143 m (469 ft)

Population (2010 census)
  - Total: 56,795
- Time zone: UTC-3 (OAT)
  - Summer (DST): UTC-2 (OAT)
- Postal code: L6360
- Area code: 2302
- Website: www.generalpico.gov.ar

General Pico is a city located in the northeast of La Pampa Province, Argentina. It is located at 143 m (469 ft) above sea level and inside the region of the Pampas Plain. It has a surface area of 2,555 km^{2} (986 sq mi).

The city was founded on November 11, 1905, by Eduardo de Chapeaurouge, The city is named after former La Pampa Province governor Eduardo de Chapeaurouge. With a population of 53,352 (2001 census [INDEC]) it is the second-largest city in the province after the provincial capital Santa Rosa, and it is the capital of the department of Maracó. The region is heavily agricultural, producing meat that is renowned around the world, and most of the grain consumed in the country.

The crossing between the west and south railroads was a determinant point in the placing of this city, founded on November 11 by Eduardo Chapeaurouge. It is named after General Eduardo Gustavo Pico, who was governor of La Pampa Province for three consecutive periods (1891-1899).

General Pico has a very important section dedicated to factories and what is known as a Zona Franca, a customs-free area where products can be imported and distributed to the rest of the country.

The city has two basketball teams in the Argentine League: Pico Foot Ball Club and Independiente de Pico. It also has its own airport.

== Climate ==
General Pico has a humid subtropical climate (Köppen climate classification Cwa) featuring hot summers and cool, dry winters. Winters feature a July high of 14.9 °C (58.8 °F), and temperatures below freezing are common, especially at night. During the summer temperatures can be hot, averaging 31 °C (87.8 °F) in January daytimes; nighttime temperatures average 16.8 °C (62.2 °F). Spring and fall are transitional seasons with warm days and cool nights, and are highly variable, with some days reaching above 39 °C (102.2 °F) or below freezing. The average annual precipitation is 933 millimetres (37 in), most of it occurring in the warmer months. The highest recorded temperature was 44.0 °C (111.2 °F) on December 28, 1971, while the lowest recorded temperature was −11.2 °C (11.8 °F) on July 10, 1988.

Climate data for General Pico (1991–2020, extremes 1961–present)
Month	Jan	Feb	Mar	Apr	May	Jun	Jul	Aug	Sep	Oct	Nov	Dec	Year
Record high °C (°F)	42.3 (108.1)	41.8 (107.2)	39.1 (102.4)	37.0 (98.6)	32.6 (90.7)	28.0 (82.4)	29.9 (85.8)	35.6 (96.1)	36.0 (96.8)	41.3 (106.3)	39.5 (103.1)	44.0 (111.2)	44.0 (111.2)
Mean daily maximum °C (°F)	30.9 (87.6)	29.6 (85.3)	27.4 (81.3)	23.2 (73.8)	18.8 (65.8)	15.7 (60.3)	15.1 (59.2)	18.1 (64.6)	20.8 (69.4)	23.5 (74.3)	27.4 (81.3)	30.2 (86.4)	23.4 (74.1)
Daily mean °C (°F)	23.8 (74.8)	22.4 (72.3)	20.2 (68.4)	16.1 (61.0)	12.2 (54.0)	8.9 (48.0)	8.0 (46.4)	10.4 (50.7)	13.3 (55.9)	16.6 (61.9)	20.3 (68.5)	23.0 (73.4)	16.3 (61.3)
Mean daily minimum °C (°F)	17.1 (62.8)	15.9 (60.6)	14.4 (57.9)	10.5 (50.9)	7.1 (44.8)	3.6 (38.5)	2.5 (36.5)	4.0 (39.2)	6.6 (43.9)	10.2 (50.4)	13.4 (56.1)	15.9 (60.6)	10.1 (50.2)
Record low °C (°F)	1.7 (35.1)	2.7 (36.9)	−2.6 (27.3)	−4.4 (24.1)	−8.3 (17.1)	−11.0 (12.2)	−11.2 (11.8)	−10.0 (14.0)	−7.4 (18.7)	−3.7 (25.3)	−2.8 (27.0)	0.2 (32.4)	−11.2 (11.8)
Average precipitation mm (inches)	106.6 (4.20)	105.3 (4.15)	130.6 (5.14)	79.5 (3.13)	33.5 (1.32)	15.9 (0.63)	17.2 (0.68)	23.8 (0.94)	48.8 (1.92)	100.4 (3.95)	103.4 (4.07)	120.2 (4.73)	885.2 (34.85)
Average precipitation days (≥ 0.1 mm)	8.3	7.1	8.4	6.5	5.4	4.1	4.2	3.5	5.8	9.0	8.2	8.4	78.9
Average snowy days	0.0	0.0	0.0	0.0	0.0	0.0	0.1	0.1	0.0	0.0	0.0	0.0	0.1
Average relative humidity (%)	63.6	68.2	71.2	72.8	78.0	76.5	73.4	65.5	63.2	65.4	59.3	59.0	68.0
Mean monthly sunshine hours	201.5	228.8	167.4	177.0	127.1	117.0	133.3	158.1	141.0	173.6	180.0	182.9	1,987.7
Mean daily sunshine hours	6.5	8.1	5.4	5.9	4.1	3.9	4.3	5.1	4.7	5.6	6.0	5.9	5.4
Source 1: Servicio Meteorológico Nacional
Source 2: Deutscher Wetterdienst
