= National University of La Pampa =

Coordinates: 36.6201°S 64.2932°W

- Universidad Nacional de La Pampa
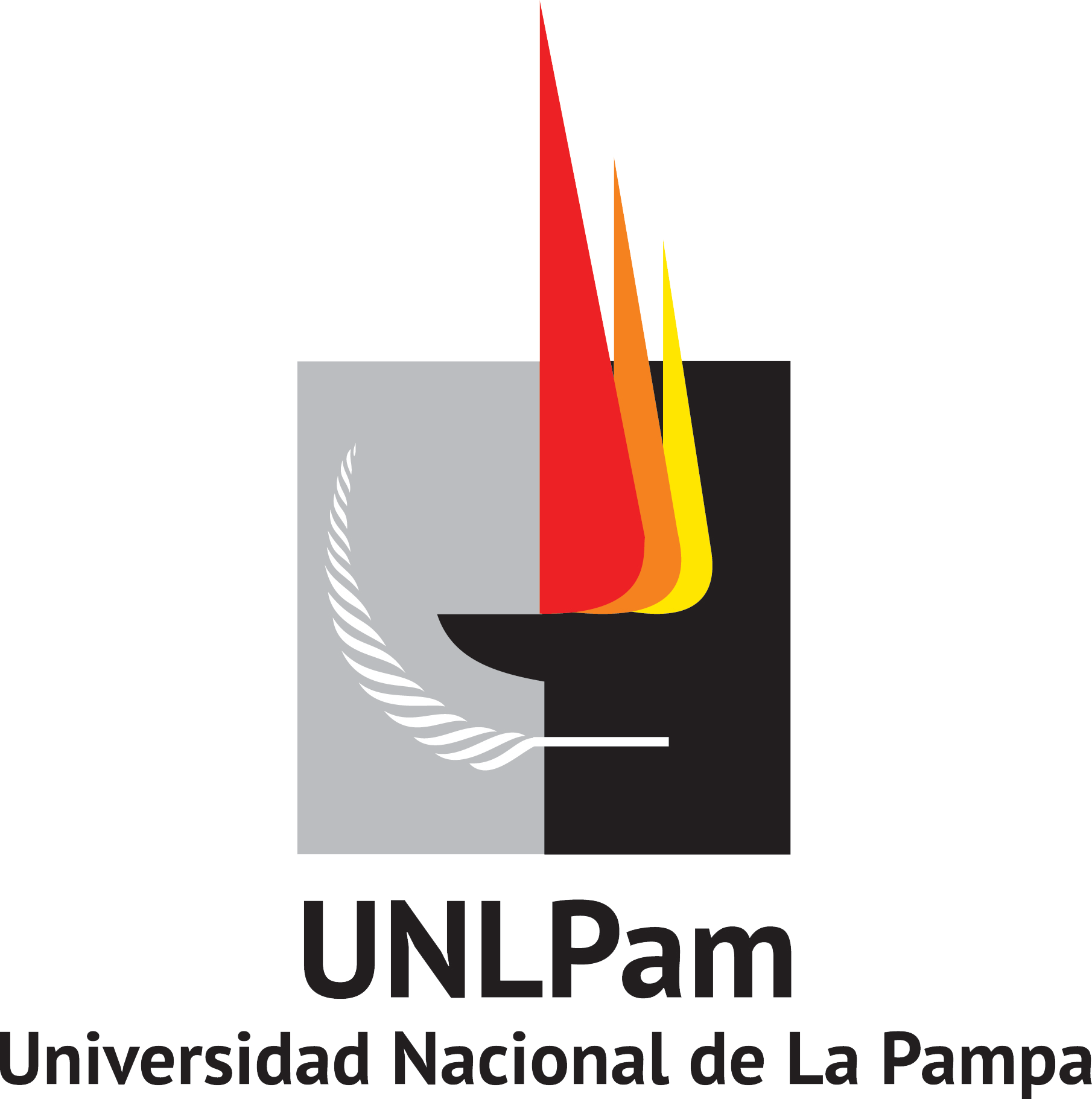
- Type: Public
- Established: 1973
- Academic staff: 1,434
- Students: 14,222 (2023)
- Location: Santa Rosa, La Pampa, Argentina
- Website: colunlpam.humanas.unlpam.edu.ar

The National University of La Pampa (Spanish: Universidad Nacional de La Pampa, UNLPAM) is an Argentine national university, situated in the city of Santa Rosa, capital of La Pampa Province. It was founded in 1958.

== History ==
It was founded as a provincial university by Decree-Law 1644/58 on September 4, 1958. On April 12, 1973, de facto President Alejandro A. Lanusse signed Decree-Law 20275, which elevated the university to national status. This action was part of the same educational expansion program that established the universities of Comahue, Mar del Plata, Jujuy, Catamarca, Lomas de Zamora, Entre Ríos, Luján, Misiones, Salta, San Juan, San Luis, and Santiago del Estero.

== Faculties ==
The National University of La Pampa has 7 faculties and 2 pre-university colleges, where its entire academic program is offered.

The faculties are:

- Faculty of Agronomy
- Faculty of Economic and Legal Sciences
- Faculty of Exact and Natural Sciences
- Faculty of Humanities
- Faculty of Veterinary Sciences
- Faculty of Engineering (based in General Pico)
- Faculty of Health Sciences

== Research and Outreach ==
UNLPam has several research programs, particularly in the fields of biology and agronomy. There are two dual-affiliation research units, established jointly by the National Council for Scientific and Technical Research and the National University of La Pampa: the Institute of Earth and Environmental Sciences of La Pampa.

== See also ==
- List of universities in Argentina
