= Rubén Marín =

Argentine politician (1934–2024)

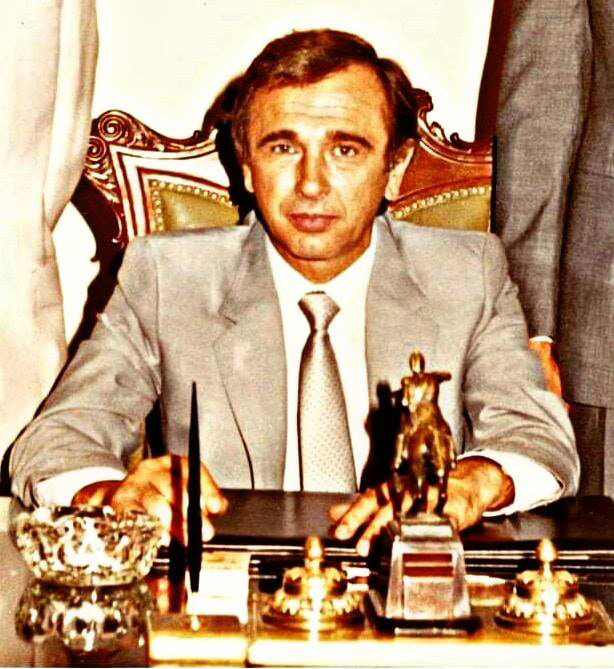
- Marín in 1983

National Senator
- In office 10 December 2003 – 10 December 2009
- Succeeded by: Carlos Verna
- Constituency: La Pampa
- In office 6 December 1989 – 18 December 1991
- Constituency: La Pampa

Governor of La Pampa
- In office 10 December 1991 – 9 December 2003
- Preceded by: Néstor Ahuad
- Succeeded by: Carlos Verna
- In office 10 December 1983 – 9 December 1987
- Preceded by: Eduardo Ángel Fraier (de facto)
- Succeeded by: Néstor Ahuad

National Deputy
- In office 10 December 1987 – 10 December 1989
- Constituency: La Pampa

Vice Governor of La Pampa
- In office 25 May 1973 – 24 March 1976
- Governor: Aquiles Regazzoli

Personal details
- Born: 1 May 1934 Trenel, La Pampa Province, Argentina
- Died: 27 January 2024 (aged 89) Buenos Aires, Argentina
- Party: Justicialist Party
- Spouse: María Ester Varela de Marín
- Profession: Lawyer

Rubén Hugo Marín (1 May 1934 – 27 January 2024) was an Argentine politician who was a Senator for La Pampa Province. He was also a governor of the province on two occasions. Marín, a lawyer by profession, was a member of the Justicialist Party.

Born in Trenel, Marín enrolled at the National University of La Plata, and graduated with a juris doctor in 1961. He was Peronist gubernatorial candidate Aquiles Regazzoli's running mate in 1973, and served as Vice Governor of La Pampa from 1973 to 1976. Marín was elected governor in 1983 upon the restoration of democracy, serving until 1987. He was then elected to the Argentine Chamber of Deputies, and two years later, to the Senate.

Voters returned Marín to the governor's post in 1991, and he was re-elected in 1995 and 1999. He was elected to the Senate in 2003; there, he joined the majority Front for Victory parliamentary group, supporting the national government of President Néstor Kirchner.

Marín ran for a fifth term as governor in 2007, but was defeated in party primaries by the faction headed by Carlos Verna. Marín's term in the Senate expired on 10 December 2009.

Marín died on 27 January 2024, at the age of 89.
