= Santa Rosa, La Pampa =

Santa Rosa
- City
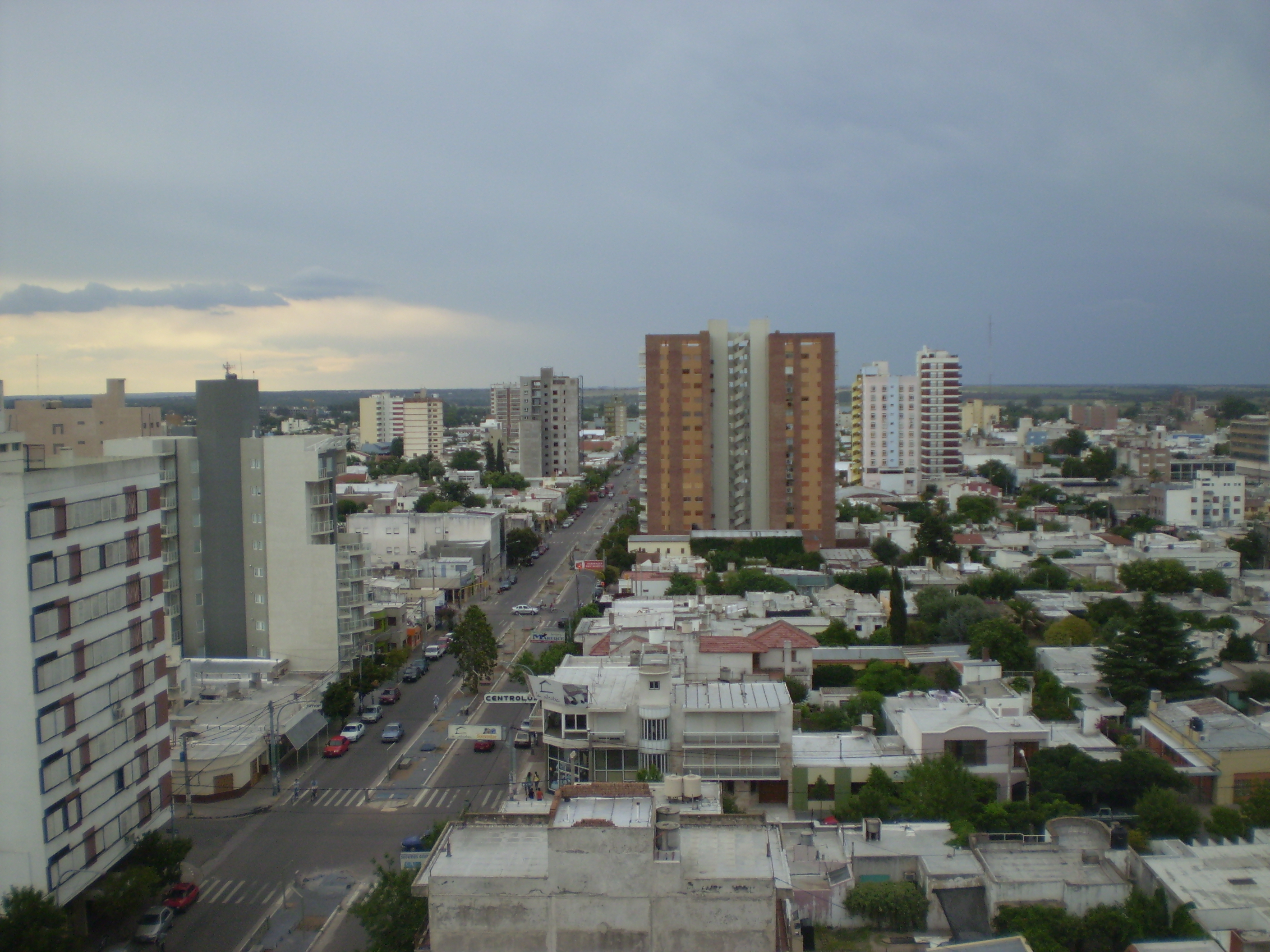
- Panoramic of Santa Rosa

- Location within Argentina Location within La Pampa Province
- Coordinates: 36°37′0″S 64°17′0″W
- Country: Argentina
- Province: La Pampa
- Department: Capital
- Founded: 22 April 1892

Government
  - Intendant: Luciano di Nápoli

Area
  - City: 1,500 km^{2} (580 sq mi)
- Elevation: 175 m (574 ft)

Population (2010 census)
  - Urban: 102,880
- Time zone: UTC−3 (ART)
- Postal code: L6300
- Phone code: +54 2954
- Website: (in Spanish) www.santarosa.gob.ar

Santa Rosa (Spanish pronunciation: [ˈsanta ˈrosa]) is a city in the Argentine Pampas (lowlands), and the capital of La Pampa Province, Argentina. It lies in the east of the province, on the shore of the Don Tomás Lagoon, at the intersection of National Route 5 and National Route 35. The city (94,340) and its surroundings hold 102,610 inhabitants (2001 census [INDEC]), around a third of the population of the province. Its current mayor is Luciano di Nápoli. Founded in 1892 by Tomás Mason, Santa Rosa did not develop into a relatively important agricultural centre until the second half of the 20th century. It is still one of the smallest provincial capitals of the country after Patagonian Rawson, Ushuaia and Viedma.

City sights include the Fitte neighbourhood (1930), the monument to San Martín, the Palace of Justice, the Teatro Español (1908), the Provincial Art Museum (with paintings by Raúl Soldi, Antonio Berni, Quinquela Martín and other important Argentine painters) and the Provincial Natural History Museum.

The Santa Rosa Airport (IATA: RSA, ICAO: SAZR) is located 2 kilometres from Santa Rosa on Route 35, and serves regular flights to Buenos Aires.

Near Santa Rosa is the city of Toay; together both cities form the Gran Santa Rosa metropolitan area.

== Geography ==
Street map of Santa Rosa downtown

Santa Rosa was founded on the western edge of the Argentine Pampas, in the contact zone of two different natural environments: the end of the plain and the beginning of the land of the Pampas broken valley.

The town occupies part of a centripetal basin having its base in Don Tomás Lagoon, where rainwater drains from the surrounding area. The floor area lies west of it, in hilly terrain where the highest elevations are in the east, with two small plateaus located 200 meters. This high turnover is also observed north, with heights up to 195 meters. From here the terrain descends to the west and south, with slopes that are steep in some areas, since more than 3%. The southwest sector is a lower and less undulating area, descending to 167 masl.

=== Climate ===
Santa Rosa has a humid subtropical climate (Cfa (bordering on Cwa), according to the Köppen climate classification), with warm to hot summers and chilly, dry winters. The highest temperature recorded was 45.7 °C (114 °F) on January 6, 1955 while the record low is −12.7 °C (9 °F) on June 13, 1967.

Climate data for Santa Rosa (1991–2020, extremes 1902–present)
Month	Jan	Feb	Mar	Apr	May	Jun	Jul	Aug	Sep	Oct	Nov	Dec	Year
Record high °C (°F)	45.7 (114.3)	42.2 (108.0)	39.7 (103.5)	36.5 (97.7)	31.8 (89.2)	27.1 (80.8)	27.8 (82.0)	34.4 (93.9)	35.2 (95.4)	38.4 (101.1)	39.9 (103.8)	42.8 (109.0)	45.7 (114.3)
Mean daily maximum °C (°F)	31.5 (88.7)	29.9 (85.8)	27.3 (81.1)	22.7 (72.9)	18.2 (64.8)	15.1 (59.2)	14.5 (58.1)	17.6 (63.7)	20.3 (68.5)	23.0 (73.4)	27.1 (80.8)	30.3 (86.5)	23.1 (73.6)
Daily mean °C (°F)	23.8 (74.8)	22.2 (72.0)	19.7 (67.5)	15.2 (59.4)	11.3 (52.3)	8.1 (46.6)	7.4 (45.3)	9.6 (49.3)	12.5 (54.5)	15.8 (60.4)	19.6 (67.3)	22.7 (72.9)	15.7 (60.3)
Mean daily minimum °C (°F)	16.5 (61.7)	15.2 (59.4)	13.4 (56.1)	9.5 (49.1)	6.1 (43.0)	3.0 (37.4)	2.1 (35.8)	3.5 (38.3)	5.9 (42.6)	9.2 (48.6)	12.4 (54.3)	15.2 (59.4)	9.3 (48.7)
Record low °C (°F)	0.9 (33.6)	2.3 (36.1)	−3.7 (25.3)	−7.0 (19.4)	−8.6 (16.5)	−12.7 (9.1)	−12.3 (9.9)	−10.0 (14.0)	−8.8 (16.2)	−4.3 (24.3)	−1.2 (29.8)	2.0 (35.6)	−12.7 (9.1)
Average precipitation mm (inches)	95.3 (3.75)	88.3 (3.48)	99.0 (3.90)	63.8 (2.51)	32.1 (1.26)	17.3 (0.68)	18.8 (0.74)	26.9 (1.06)	49.7 (1.96)	90.2 (3.55)	75.9 (2.99)	96.1 (3.78)	753.4 (29.66)
Average precipitation days (≥ 0.1 mm)	8.3	7.2	7.2	6.1	4.7	4.2	4.3	3.5	5.3	8.3	7.6	8.0	74.7
Average snowy days	0.0	0.0	0.0	0.0	0.0	0.0	0.1	0.1	0.0	0.0	0.0	0.0	0.1
Average relative humidity (%)	57.1	62.9	68.4	70.7	75.8	73.6	70.2	62.7	60.0	62.1	56.5	53.3	64.4
Mean monthly sunshine hours	306.9	248.6	226.3	183.0	151.9	132.0	145.7	179.8	180.0	210.8	279.0	297.6	2,541.6
Mean daily sunshine hours	9.9	8.8	7.3	6.1	4.9	4.4	4.7	5.8	6.0	6.8	9.3	9.6	7.0
Percentage possible sunshine	71	68	59	59	50	45	47	54	53	56	65	67	58
Source 1: Servicio Meteorológico Nacional
Source 2: NOAA (percent sun 1961–1990) Meteo Climat (record highs and lows),

== Sport ==
The city is home to the football teams Club Atlético Santa Rosa, Club Atlético All Boys and Club Atlético Belgrano.

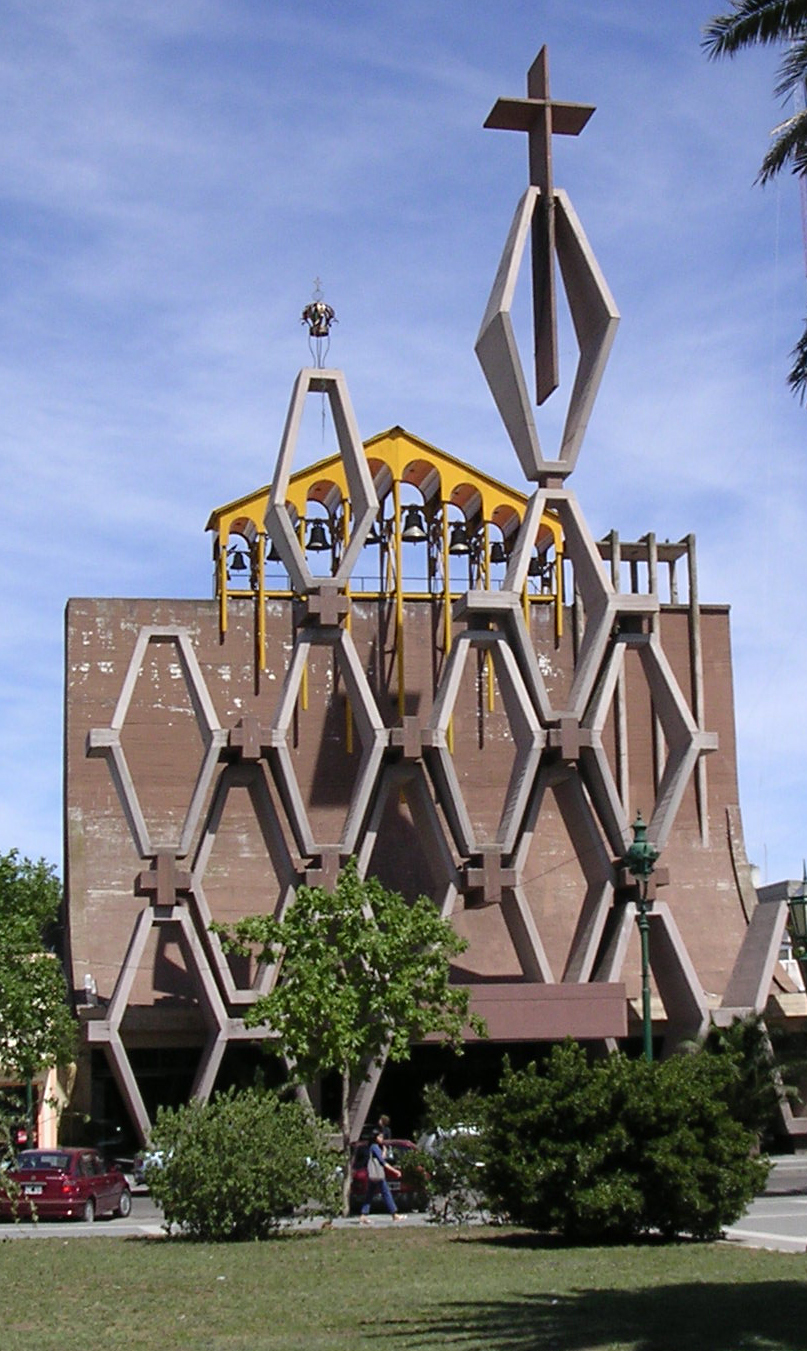
Church in Santa Rosa, Argentina.

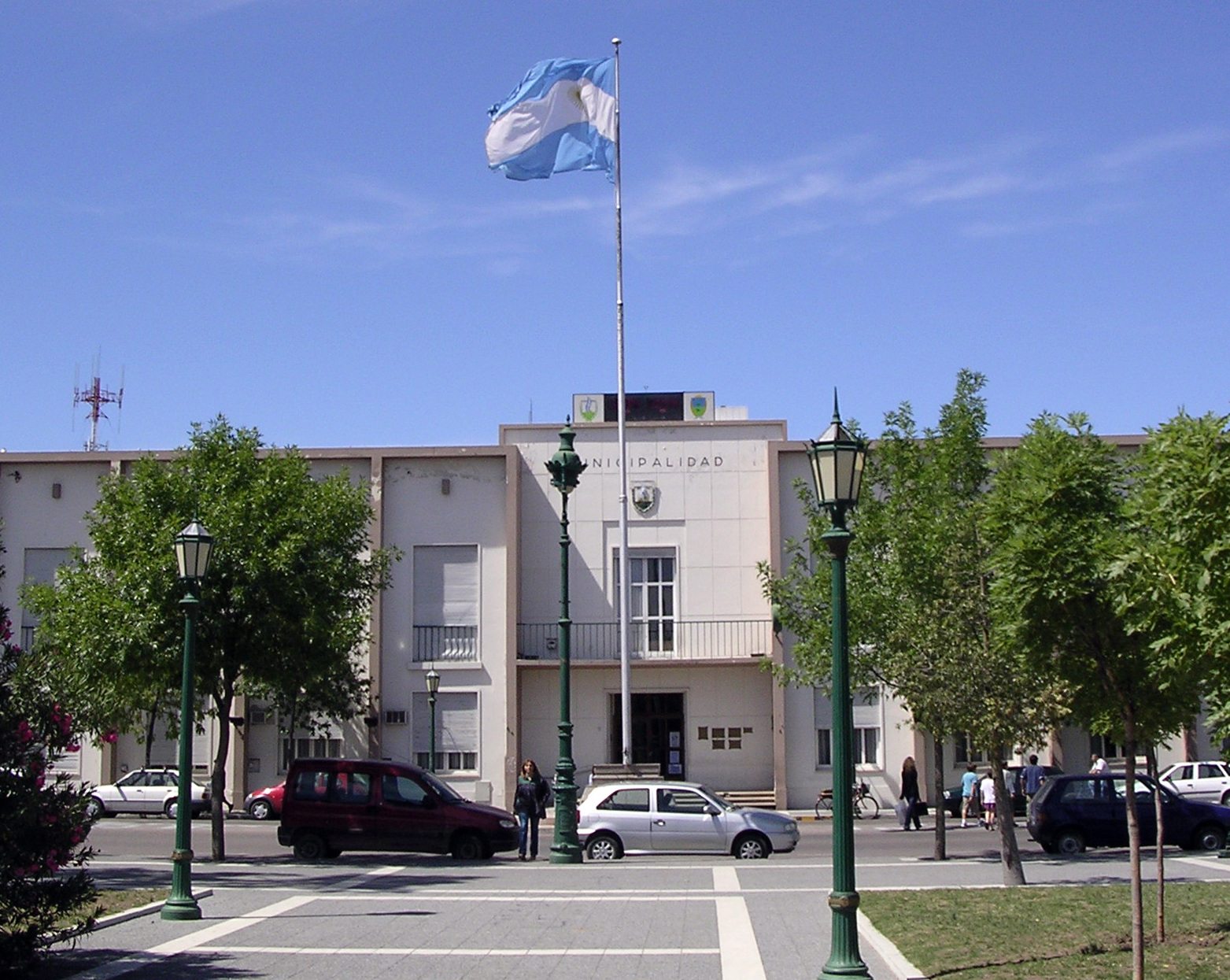
Municipal Building, Santa Rosa, Argentina.

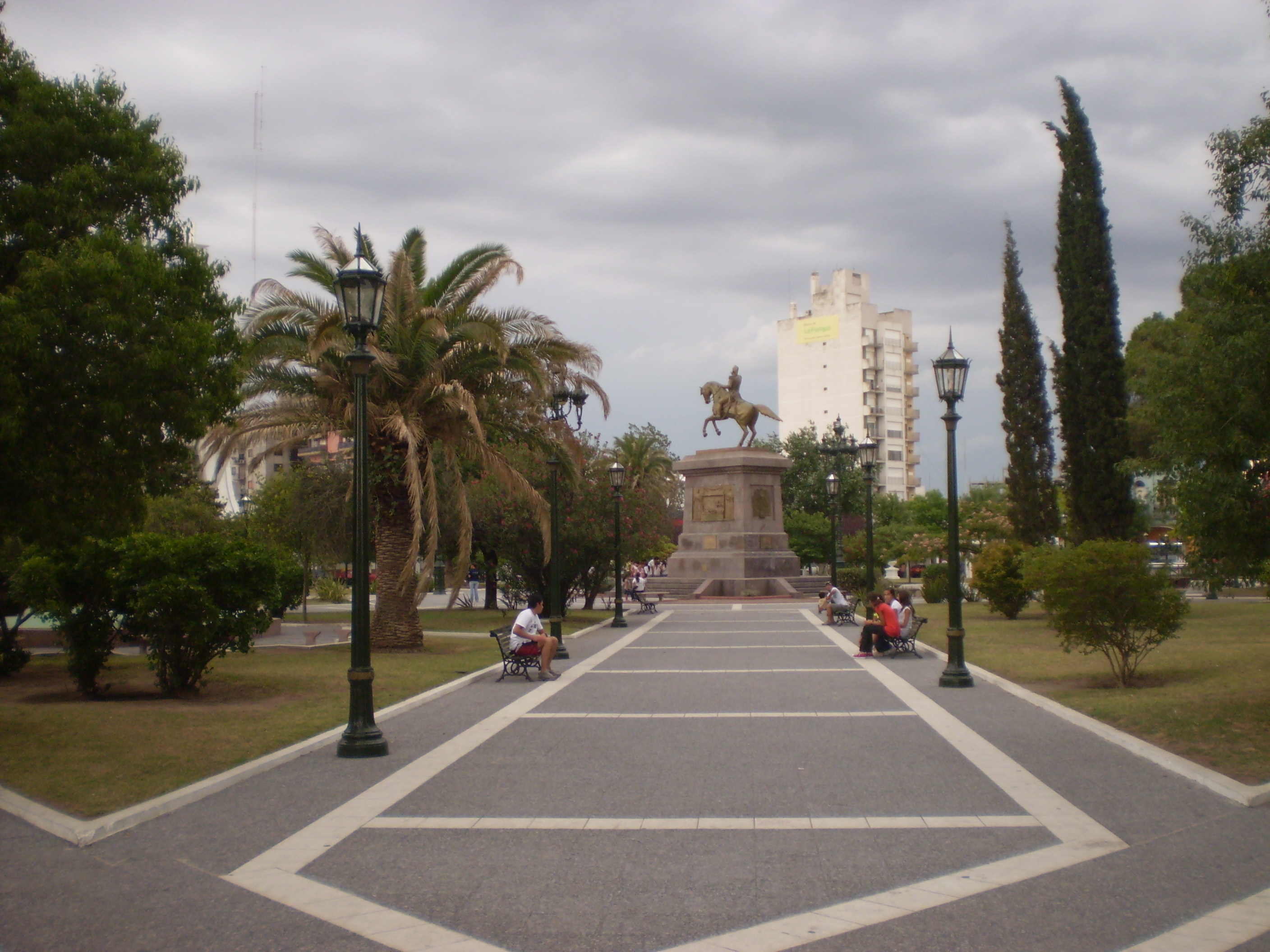
Monument to José de San Martín, Santa Rosa.
