= Provinces of Argentina =

Top level administrative division of Argentina

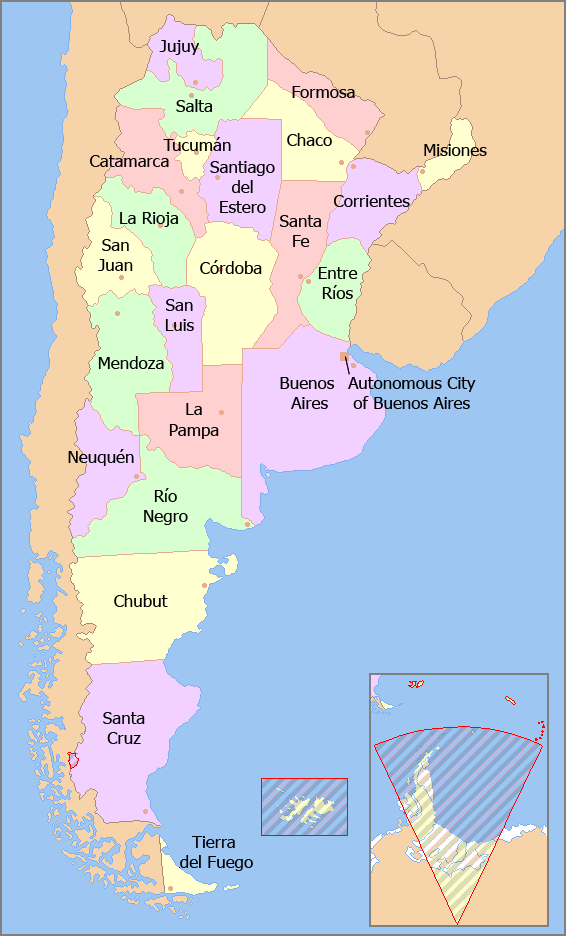
- Argentina's provinces. This map includes territorial claims on the Falkland Islands, South Georgia and a portion of Antarctica, outlined in red.
- Category: Federated state
- Location: Argentina
- Number: 23 Provinces; 1 Autonomous city
- Populations: Smallest: Tierra del Fuego Province, 190,641; Largest: Buenos Aires Province, 17,569,053
- Areas: Smallest: Tierra del Fuego Province, 21,263 km² (province), Autonomous City of Buenos Aires, 203 km² Largest: Buenos Aires Province, 307,571 km²
- Government: Provincial government
- Subdivisions: Buenos Aires City: Commune (15); Buenos Aires Province: Partido (135); Other provinces: Department (378)

Argentina has 23 provinces (Spanish: provincias, singular provincia) and one autonomous city, Buenos Aires, which serves as the federal capital, as determined by Congress.

The provinces and the capital have their own constitutions and exist under a federal system.

== History ==
During the War of Independence, cities and their surrounding areas became provinces through local councils (cabildos). This process was finalized during the Anarchy of the Year XX, forming the first 13 provinces.

Jujuy seceded from Salta in 1834, and the thirteen provinces became fourteen. After seceding for a decade, Buenos Aires Province accepted the 1853 Constitution of Argentina in 1861, and its capital city was made a federal territory in 1880.

A law from 1862 designated as national territories those territories under federal control but outside the frontiers of the provinces. In 1884 they served as bases for the establishment of the governorates of Misiones, Formosa, Chaco, La Pampa, Neuquén, Río Negro, Chubut, Santa Cruz and Tierra del Fuego. The agreement about a frontier dispute with Chile in 1900 created the National Territory of Los Andes; its lands were incorporated into Jujuy, Salta and Catamarca in 1943. La Pampa and Chaco became provinces in 1951. Misiones did so in 1953, and Formosa, Neuquén, Río Negro, Chubut and Santa Cruz, in 1955. The last national territory, Tierra del Fuego, became the Tierra del Fuego, Antártida e Islas del Atlántico Sur Province in 1990. This province nominally includes Argentina's claims to the Falkland Islands and South Georgia and the South Sandwich Islands and to a segment of Antarctica that overlaps with the British and Chilean claims on that continent.

== Political organization ==
Argentina is a federation of twenty-three provinces and one autonomous city, Buenos Aires. Provinces are divided for administration purposes into departments and municipalities, except for Buenos Aires Province, which is divided into partidos and localidades. Buenos Aires City itself is divided into communes (comuna) and non-official neighbourhoods (barrios).

Provinces hold all the power that they chose not to delegate to the federal government; they must be representative commonwealths and must not contradict the Constitution. Beyond this, they are fully autonomous: they enact their own constitutions, freely organize their local governments, and own and manage their natural and financial resources. Thus, each province has its own set of provincial laws and justice system, a supreme court, a governor, an autonomous police force, and a congress; in eight provinces, the legislature is bicameral, comprising an upper chamber (the Senate) and a lower chamber (the House of Deputies), while in the remaining fifteen provinces and in Buenos Aires City, it is unicameral. (Note: The City of Buenos Aires is an autonomous city, but its local organization has similarities with the provinces: it has its own constitution, an elected mayor, a congress, and representatives to the Senate and Deputy chambers.)

In case of sedition, insurrection, territorial invasion, or any other emerging threats against the laws of the nation on any province or the federal capital, the Congress has the authority to declare a federal intervention on the compromised district, even in the absence of a formal request by the affected part. When Congress is in recess and thus unable to intervene, the President is entitled to decree such intervention, but this executive order is subject to Congressional override upon the Houses' immediate reassembly. Once the intervention is declared the compromised district's government is immediately dissolved—in whole or in part depending on Congressional decision—and the President appoints a representative or intervenor, who will serve for a short time until the emergency is solved. Since 1983 four provinces were intervened, namely Catamarca, Corrientes (twice), Santiago del Estero (twice), and Tucumán.

During the 20th century, some provinces have had governments that were traditionally controlled by a single family (i.e. the Saadi family in Catamarca, or the Sapag family in Neuquén); in one case, it is still the same situation as of 2009: the province of San Luis was ruled almost without a break by the Rodríguez Saá family since December 1983.

Article 62 of the Constitution of the city of Buenos Aires states that "Suffrage is free, equal, secret, universal, compulsory and not accumulative. The foreign residents enjoy this right, with the correlative obligations, on equal terms with Argentine citizens registered in this district, in the terms established by the law."

== List of provinces ==
Provinces of Argentina
Flag	Province	Capital	Secondary capital (Note: Defined by law 27,589)	HASC subdivision code	Population (2022)	Area	Density per km^{2}
Buenos Aires	Autonomous City of Buenos Aires	Buenos Aires	N/A	DF	3,121,707	205.9 km^{2} (79.5 sq mi)	15,161.3
Buenos Aires Province	Buenos Aires	La Plata	La Matanza and General Pueyrredón	BA	17,523,996	305,907 km^{2} (118,111 sq mi)	57.3
Catamarca Province	Catamarca	San Fernando del Valle de Catamarca	Tinogasta	CT	429,562	101,486 km^{2} (39,184 sq mi)	4.2
Chaco Province	Chaco	Resistencia	Presidencia Roque Sáenz Peña	CC	1,129,606	99,763 km^{2} (38,519 sq mi)	11.3
Chubut Province	Chubut	Rawson	Comodoro Rivadavia	CH	592,621	224,302 km^{2} (86,603 sq mi)	2.6
Córdoba Province, Argentina	Córdoba	Córdoba	Río Cuarto	CB	3,840,905	164,708 km^{2} (63,594 sq mi)	23.3
Corrientes Province	Corrientes	Corrientes	Goya	CN	1,212,696	89,123 km^{2} (34,411 sq mi)	13.6
Entre Ríos Province	Entre Ríos	Paraná	Concordia	ER	1,425,578	78,384 km^{2} (30,264 sq mi)	18.2
Formosa Province	Formosa	Formosa	Formosa	FM	607,419	75,488 km^{2} (29,146 sq mi)	8.0
Jujuy Province	Jujuy	San Salvador de Jujuy	San Pedro de Jujuy	JY	811,611	53,244 km^{2} (20,558 sq mi)	15.2
La Pampa Province	La Pampa	Santa Rosa	General Pico	LP	361,859	143,493 km^{2} (55,403 sq mi)	2.5
La Rioja Province, Argentina	La Rioja	La Rioja	Chilecito	LR	383,865	91,494 km^{2} (35,326 sq mi)	4.2
Mendoza Province	Mendoza	Mendoza	Guaymallén	MZ	2,043,540	149,069 km^{2} (57,556 sq mi)	13.7
Misiones Province	Misiones	Posadas	Oberá	MN	1,278,873	29,911 km^{2} (11,549 sq mi)	42.8
Neuquén Province	Neuquén	Neuquén	Cutral Có	NQ	710,814	94,422 km^{2} (36,457 sq mi)	7.5
Río Negro Province	Río Negro	Viedma	San Carlos de Bariloche	RN	750,768	202,169 km^{2} (78,058 sq mi)	3.7
Salta Province	Salta	Salta	San Ramón de la Nueva Orán	SA	1,441,351	155,341 km^{2} (59,977 sq mi)	9.3
San Juan Province, Argentina	San Juan	San Juan	Caucete	SJ	822,853	88,296 km^{2} (34,091 sq mi)	9.3
San Luis Province	San Luis	San Luis	Villa Mercedes	SL	542,069	75,347 km^{2} (29,092 sq mi)	7.2
Santa Cruz Province, Argentina	Santa Cruz	Río Gallegos	Caleta Olivia	SC	337,226	244,458 km^{2} (94,386 sq mi)	1.4
Santa Fe Province	Santa Fe	Santa Fe	Rosario	SF	3,544,908	133,249 km^{2} (51,448 sq mi)	26.6
Santiago del Estero Province	Santiago del Estero	Santiago del Estero	La Banda	SE	1,060,906	136,934 km^{2} (52,871 sq mi)	7.7
Tierra del Fuego Province, Argentina	Tierra del Fuego	Ushuaia	Río Grande	TF	185,651*	20,698 km^{2} (7,992 sq mi)*	8.8*
Tucumán Province	Tucumán	San Miguel de Tucumán	Monteros	TM	1,731,820	22,592 km^{2} (8,723 sq mi)	76.7

* Derived from multiple values

== See also ==
- Comparison between Argentine provinces and countries by GDP (PPP) per capita
- Demographics of Argentina
- ISO 3166-2:AR, the ISO codes for the provinces of Argentina.
- List of Argentine provinces by gross regional product
- List of Argentine provinces by Human Development Index
- Conference of Governors of National Territories

== Bibliography ==
Legal documents

- National Constituent Convention (22 August 1994), Constitution of the Argentine Nation, Santa Fe: Honorable Senado de la Nación Argentina, archived from the original on 4 June 2011

Books

- Rey Balmaceda, Raúl (1995). Mi país, la Argentina (in Spanish). Buenos Aires: Arte Gráfico Editorial Argentino. ISBN 84-599-3442-X.
- Rock, David (1987). Argentina, 1516-1987: From Spanish Colonization to the Falklands War. University of California Press. ISBN 978-0520061781.
