= Factory 25 =

Factory 25 is a Brooklyn-based independent film distribution and production company, founded by Matt Grady in 2009.

== History ==
Grady founded Factory 25 in 2009 after leaving a position as director of production at Plexifilm. The name Factory 25 is from "the manufacturing home of the famous 1909 Honus Wagner tobacco card".

The company's first release, Frownland, was the film that inspired Grady to create his own distribution company, as he believed no other company would distribute the film.

As of 2010, Grady remained the company's sole employee.

== Releases ==
The films that Factory 25 produces and distributes are often microbudget features with nontraditional narratives. Factory 25 largely focuses on physical releases such as DVDs, Blu-Rays, VHS Tapes, CDs and Vinyl LPs. As of 2010, a typical production run consisted of 1,000 DVD-LP pairs (movie and soundtrack), where sale of 40% of the production run would be the break-even point. The company's physical releases often include objects such as 16mm film strips, drawings and written essays. Matt Grady has expressed a desire to make the company's physical releases collectible and appealing, "like a fetish item". The company has worked and distributed films alongside notable distribution companies such as Oscilloscope Laboratories and streaming services such as Fandor.

== Filmography ==
Distributed By Factory 25:

Title	Year	Director
Hero	1983	Alexandre Rockwell
Blood Brothers	1989	Mike Diana
Baked Baby Jesus	1990	Mike Diana
In the Soup	1992	Alexandre Rockwell
Dutch Harbor - Where the Sea Breaks Its Back	1998	Braden King and Laura Moya
Funny Ha Ha	2002	Andrew Bujalski
High School Record	2005	Ben Wolfinsohn
We Go Way Back	2006	Lynn Shelton
You Weren't There	2007	Joe Losurdo and Christina Tillman
Frownland	2007	Ronald Bronstein
Altamont Now	2008	Joshua von Brown
Make-out With Violence	2008	The Deagol Brothers
Until the Light Takes Us	2008	Aaron Aites and Audrey Ewell
You Wont Miss Me	2009	Ry Russo-Young
Beetle Queen Conquers Tokyo	2009	Jessica Oreck
Brock Enright: Good Times Will Never Be the Same	2009	Jody Lee Lipes
Impolex	2009	Alex Ross Perry
Wah Do Dem	2009	Sam Fleischner and Ben Chace
Rio Breaks	2009	Justin Mitchell
Damon and Naomi: 1001 Nights	2009	Cedrick Eymenier
All the Way from Michigan Not Mars	2009	Matt Boyd
Gabi on the Roof in July	2010	Lawrence Michael Levine
Gravity Was Everywhere Back Then	2010	Brent Green
Shit Year	2010	Cam Archer
Two Gates of Sleep	2010	Alistair Banks Griffith
Vacation!	2010	Zach Clark
N.Y. Export: Op. Jazz	2010	Jody Lee Lipes and Henry Joost
Convento	2010	Jarred Alterman
I am Secretly an Important Man	2010	Peter Sillen
The Oregonian	2011	Calvin Lee Reeder
The Zone	2011	Joe Swanberg
The Color Wheel	2011	Alex Ross Perry
The Family Jams	2011	Kevin Barker
A Rubberband is an Unlikely Instrument	2011	Matt Boyd
The Other Side of Sleep	2011	Rebecca Daly
Kids of Today	2011	Jerome de Missolz
Green	2011	Sophia Takal
Buttons	2011	The Safdie Brothers
Art History	2011	Joe Swanberg
Silver Bullets	2011	Joe Swanberg
New Jerusalem	2011	Rick Alverson
Fake It So Real	2011	Robert Greene
Jobriath A.D.	2012	Kieran Turner
Kid-Thing	2012	David Zellner
Bad Fever	2012	Dustin Guy Defa
Better Than Something: Jay Reatard	2012	Alex Hammond and Ian Markiewicz
Sun Don't Shine	2012	Amy Seimetz
Pavilion	2012	Tim Sutton
Nancy, Please	2012	Andrew Semans
Marvin, Seth and Stanley	2012	Stephen Gurewitz
Richard's Wedding	2012	Onur Tukel
Exit Elena	2012	Nathan Silver
Apocalypse: A Bill Callahan Tour Film	2012	Hanly Banks
Ape	2012	Joel Potrykus
Francine	2012	Brian M. Cassidy and Melanie Shatzky
First Winter	2012	Benjamin Dickinson
All the Light in the Sky	2012	Joe Swanberg
The Sheik and I	2012	Caveh Zahedi
White Reindeer	2013	Zach Clark
The Voice of the Voiceless	2013	Maximón Monihan
Boneshaker	2013	Frances Bodomo
Privacy Setting	2013	Joe Swanberg
Soft in the Head	2013	Nathan Silver
Hellaware	2013	Michael M. Bilandic
Bluebird	2013	Lance Edmands
Little Feet	2013	Alexandre Rockwell
See You Next Tuesday	2013	Drew Tobia
Go Down Death	2013	Aaron Schimberg
Brothers Hypnotic	2013	Reuben Atlas
Buzzard	2014	Joel Potrykus
Young Bodies Heal Quickly	2014	Andrew T. Betzer
Christmas, Again	2014	Charles Poekel
Down in Shadowland	2014	Tom DiCillo
Sex and Broadcasting: A Film About WFMU	2014	Tim K. Smith
Diamond Tongues	2015	Pavan Moondi and Brian Robertson
Videophilia (and Other Viral Syndromes)	2015	Juan Daniel F. Molero
Stinking Heaven	2015	Nathan Silver
Almost There	2015	Dan Rybicky and Aaron Wickenden
Uncle Kent 2	2015	Todd Rohall
Dwarves Kingdom	2015	Matthew Salton
Bloomin Mud Shuffle	2015	Frank V. Ross
Come Down Molly	2015	Gregory Kohn
Abby Singer/Songwriter	2015	Onur Tukel
Ma	2015	Celia Rowlson-Hall
Homemakers	2015	Colin Healey
The Lost Arcade	2015	A.D. Calvo
The Missing Girl	2015	Kurt Vincent
Little Sister	2016	Zach Clark
The Arbalest	2016	Adam Pinney
All This Panic	2016	Jenny Gage
Icaros: A Vision	2016	Leonor Caraballo and Matteo Norzi
No Light and No Land Anywhere	2016	Amber Sealey
For the Plasma	2016	Bingham Bryant and Kyle Molzan
Werewolf	2016	Ashley McKenzie
California Dreams	2017	Mike Ott
Sylvio	2017	Albert Birney and Kentucker Audley
Assholes	2017	Peter Vack
The Show About the Show	2017	Caveh Zahedi
Sundowners	2017	Pavan Moondi
Tormenting the Hen	2017	Theodore Collatos
The Misogynists	2017	Onur Tukel
The Great Pretender	2018	Nathan Silver
The Unicorn	2018	Timothy Geraghty & Isabelle Dupuis
Being Frank: The Chris Sievey Story	2019	Steve Sullivan
Jobe'z World	2019	Michael M. Bilandic
Two Plains & a Fancy	2019	Lev Kalman and Whitney Horn
August at Akiko's	2019	Christopher Makoto Yogi
Ham on Rye	2019	Tyler Taormina
Empty Metal	2019	Adam Khalil and Bayley Sweitzer
Tito	2019	Grace Glowicki
Other Music	2019	Rob Hatch-Miller & Puloma Basu
Frances Ferguson	2019	Bob Byington
Queen of Lapa	2019	Theodore Collatos & Carolina Monnerat
Amateur on Plastic	2020	Mark Robinson
Inspector Ike	2020	Graham Mason
Superior	2021	Erin Vassilopoulos
Honky Kong	2021	Stephen Gurewitz
Topology of Sirens	2021	Jonathan Davies
Out of Time: The Material Issue Story	2021	Balin Schneider
Actual People	2021	Kit Zauhar
You Mean Everything to Me	2021	Bryan Wizemann
Happer's Comet	2022	Tyler Taormina
Queens of the Qing Dynasty	2022	Ashley McKenzie
Warm Blood	2022	Rick Charnoski
Quantum Cowboys	2022	Geoff Marslett
Way Out Ahead of Us	2022	Rob Rice
The Reverend	2022	Nick Canfield
We Were Famous, You Don't Remember: The Embarrassment	2022	Daniel Fetherston & Danny Szlauderbach
Residency	2023	Winnie Cheung
Hummingbirds	2023	Silvia Del Carmen Castaños & Estefanía "Beba" Contreras
This Closeness	2023	Kit Zauhar
Louder Than You Think	2023	Jed I. Rosenberg
An Evening Song (for Three Voices)	2023	Graham Swon
Family Portrait	2023	Lucy Kerr
Crass: The Sound of Free Speech (The Story of Reality Asylum)	2023	Brandon Spivey
Sam's World	2024	Lily Lady
A Man Imagined	2024	Melanie Shatzky & Brian M. Cassidy
The Heirloom	2024	Ben Petrie
Vulcanizadora	2024	Joel Potrykus
No Sleep Till	2024	Alexandra Simpson
Or Something	2024	Jeffrey Scotti Schroeder
Lump	2024	Alexandre Rockwell
Softshell	2024	Jinho Myung
City Wide Fever	2025	Josh Heaps
The Hedonist	2025	Nick Funess
The Gits - 20th Anniversary Edition	2025	Kerri O'Kane
Swamp Dogg Gets His Pool Painted	2025	Isaac Gale & Ryan Olson
Micro Budget	2025	Morgan Evans

Produced By Factory 25:

Title	Year	Director
Summer of Blood	2014	Onur Tukel
Applesauce	2015	Onur Tukel
Abby Singer/Songwriter	2015	Onur Tukel
Cooklyn	2016	Bryan Wizemann
Tormenting the Hen	2017	Theodore Collatos
The Great Pretender	2018	Nathan Silver
Queen of Lapa	2019	Theodore Collatos
You Mean Everything to Me	2020	Bryan Wizemann
Inspector Ike	2020	Graham Mason
All The Old Bells	2020	Brent Green
Vulcanizadora	2024	Joel Potrykus

== Music Releases ==
Album	Year	Artist
Music from Frownland	2008	Paul Grimstad
Damon and Naomi: 1001 Nights	2001-2009	Naomi Yang
You Weren't There: A History of Chicago Punk 1977-1984	2009	Various Artists
All the Way from Michigan Not Mars	2009	Rosie Thomas, Sufjan Stephens, and Denison Witmer
Make-Out With Violence Soundtrack	2009	The Non-Commissioned Officers
You Wont Miss Me	2009	Stylofone
Torben	2010	Brock Enright & Kirsten Deirup
Brock Enright: Good Times Will Never Be the Same	2010	Jody Lee Lipes
Exclamation Point	2010	DA!
Sub-Urban Insult Rock for the Anti-Lectual	2010	Tutu & the Pirates
I Am Secretly an Important Man	2011	Jessie Bernstein
The Oregonian Soundtrack	2011	Calvin Lee Reeder
Found Stock: Better Than Something: Jay Reatard	2012	Jay Reatard
Pavilion Original Soundtrack	2012	Sam Prekop
Brothers Hypnotic	2013	Hypnotic Brass Ensemble
Unreleased Music from "POPSTAR," Jobriath's Lost Musical	2013	Jobriath
Apocalypse: A Bill Callahan Tour Film	2014	Bill Callahan
I'll Cut Yo Dick Off	2014	The Young Torture Killers
Heaven Knows What: Original Music From the Film	2015	Ariel Pink and Blood Orange
Tour of WFMU	2016	Dave Hill & Scott Williams
August at Akiko's	2019	Alex Zhang Hungtai
Other Music	2021	Various Artists
Blammo!! Wams & Bams Mysteroid	2023	Grymstyd (aka: Paul Grimstad)

== Accolades ==
Factory 25 was named "Best Distributor" by The L Magazine in their "Best of Brooklyn 2013: Film" article.
