= Jennifer Prediger =

American film director

- Born: Silver Spring, MD
- Education: Eleanor Roosevelt High School, College of the Atlantic, California School of Professional Psychology
- Occupations: Filmmaker, actress, writer, director
- Known for: Apartment Troubles

Jennifer Prediger is New York City–based actress, writer, and director known for the films Uncle Kent (2011), Red Flag (2012), and Apartment Troubles (2014)—her directorial debut with collaborator Jess Weixler. Prediger also played and wrote Ask Umbra, the "world's most trusted eco advice columnist," on Grist.org.

== Education ==
Science and Technology Program at Eleanor Roosevelt High School in Greenbelt, MD. BA from College of the Atlantic in Bar Harbor, ME. MA from the California School of Professional Psychology.

== Career ==
=== Filmmaker ===
Prediger starred in Uncle Kent, a film directed by Joe Swanberg that premiered at Sundance in 2011 and was purchased by IFC. She has also gone to Sundance with The Foxy Merkins in 2014 (dir. Madeleine Olnek) and A Teacher in 2013 (dir. Hannah Fidell). She has a co-starring role as love interest and obsessed fan in the Gotham Award nominated comedy Red Flag (dir. Alex Karpovsky), released by Tribeca Film. Prediger also has leading roles in microbudget films Richard's Wedding (dir. Onur Tukel) and Pollywogs (dir. Karl Jacob with co-star Kate Lyn Shiel).

She has supporting roles in The Strange Eyes of Dr. Myes (dir. Nancy Andrews) and Valedictorian (dir. Matthew Yeager) premiering at the Rotterdam Film Festival January 2015.

She also appears in UNCLE KENT 2 (dir. Todd Rohal) and 7 CHINESE BROTHERS (dir. Bob Byington) starring Jason Schwartzman, both of which premiered at this year's SXSW festival. Earlier this year, The New York Times called her a "busy indie actress". She plays opposite Max Casella in Applesauce (dir. Onur Tukel) which premiered at the 2015 Tribeca Film Festival.

Apartment Troubles (formerly Trouble Dolls) is her first feature film as a director and writer, co-directed and written with Jess Weixler. The film stars Prediger and Weixler and features Megan Mullally, Will Forte and Jeffrey Tambor, and was released by Gravitas in spring 2015.

=== Video journalist ===
As a writer and video journalist, Prediger has interviewed Thom Yorke of Radiohead, Tom Hanks, and Tom Friedman. She has produced videos for the USDA, Newsweek, Nerve, Babble, Current TV, Onion News Network, The Washington Post and Barely Political. Her videos have been featured on The Huffington Post, NY1, The A.V. Club, Yahoo, MySpace, YouTube, Pitchfork, KIAH-TV in Houston, Texas and NY1. She's appeared as a commentator on The Today Show and NPR's All Things Considered.

Prediger was the creator and face of Grist.org's popular video advice series Ask Umbra. She also dished out workplace advice on a series known as Hey Penny on SlateV.

== Filmography ==
=== As actor ===
- Uncle Kent (2011, as Kate)
- Richard's Wedding (2012, as Alex)
- Red Flag (2012, as River)
- Pollywogs (2013, as Jullie)
- If You're F*Cking, You're F*Cking (2013, short film, as Girl in Couple)
- The Sleepy Man (2013, short film, as Phone Operator)
- A Teacher (2013, as Sophia)
- The Foxy Merkins (2013, as Ashley, Margaret's Composting Girlfriend)
- Ego Death (2013, short film)
- Life of Crime (2014, as Marshall's Assistant)
- Apartment Troubles (2014, as Olivia)
- Eight Circuit Model (2014, short film, as Chlorine)
- Valedictorian (2015, as Sandra)
- The Strange Eyes of Dr. Myes (2015, as Dr. Linda Wiley)
- Uncle Kent 2 (2015, as Jenny)
- 7 Chinese Brothers (2015, as Woman with glasses)
- Abby Singer/Songwriter (2015, as Doll House Love Interest)
- Devil Town (2015, as Carol Humphrey)
- Applesauce (2015, as Kate)
- High Phantom Playback (2015, short film, as Miss Maven)
- Rainbow Time (2016, as Sarah)
- Slash (2016, as Alien Woman)
- First Girl I Loved (2016, as Assistant Principal Heather Wiggins)
- Living Room Coffin (2016, as Iris Hawthorn)
- Fits and Starts (2016, as Shopper)
- Infinity Baby (2017)
- Newly Single (2017, as Emily)
- Frances Ferguson (2019, as Stepmom)
- The Day Before the Wedding (TBA, as Jewel)

=== Other work ===
- Apartment Troubles (2014, writer, director)
- Get Well Soon (2016, short film, writer, director)
- Pollywogs (2013, as writer)
