= Onur Tukel =

Turkish-american painter, actor and filmmaker

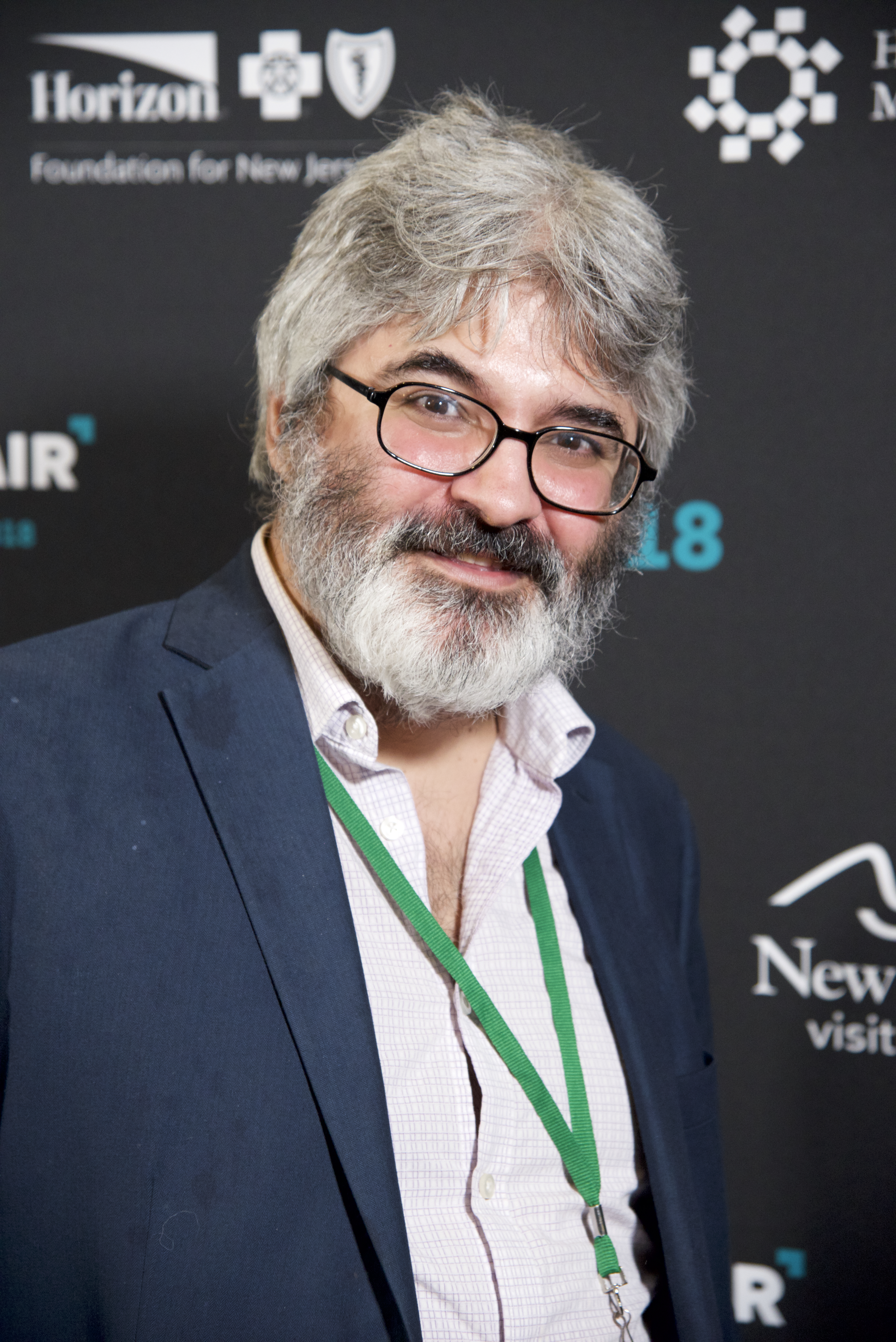
- Tukel at the 2018 Montclair Film Festival
- Born: August 5, 1972 (age 54); Taylorsville, North Carolina, U.S.
- Occupations: Actor, director, editor, painter, producer, writer
- Years active: 1997–present

Onur Tukel (born August 5, 1972) is a Turkish-American actor, painter, and filmmaker. A notable figure in the New York City independent film community, Tukel's films often deal with issues of gender and relationships.

== Career ==
In 1997, Tukel wrote and directed his first feature film House of Pancakes. His subsequent film, the vampire drama Drawing Blood, was completed in 1999. In a 2014 interview with Entertainment Weekly, Tukel recalled that Drawing Blood was "the only time [he] made money on a movie." His next film, the comedy drama Ding-a-ling-Less, was completed in 2001. In 2005, Tukel (credited as Sergio Lapel) also wrote and directed the comedy The Pigs about a group of middle age men who arrange to have their wives murdered.

In 2012, Tukel wrote, produced, directed, and starred in the comedy drama film Richard's Wedding, which featured such other independent filmmakers as Josephine Decker, Lawrence Michael Levine, and Jennifer Prediger. Despite an overall mixed critical response, the film was praised by David DeWitt of The New York Times as "a slice of the John Cassavetes, John Sayles and Richard Linklater life."

Tukel's next film, the 2014 vampire horror comedy Summer of Blood, received a warmer response from critics. In a positive review of the film, Eric Kohn of Indiewire praised Tukel as possessing "contemptible goofiness" and being "the broke, post-9/11 version of an early Woody Allen character." More recently, Tukel wrote, directed, and starred in the comedy/horror film Applesauce, which premiered at the Tribeca Film Festival on April 19, 2015.

As an actor, Tukel has also appeared in the 2011 film Septien, Alex Karpovsky's 2012 romantic comedy Red Flag, and Ping Pong Summer in 2014.

== Filmography ==
Year	Film	Credited Director	Credited Producer	Credited Writer	Credited Actor	Credited Role	Notes
1997	House of Pancakes	Yes	Yes	Yes	Yes	Man with Atlas	
1999	Drawing Blood	Yes	Yes	Yes			
2001	Ding-a-ling-Less	Yes		Yes	Yes	Penis popsicle licker	Credited as "Sergio Lapel"
2005	The Pigs	Yes	Yes	Yes	Yes	Bickering Boy	
2011	Septien			Yes	Yes	Amos Rawlings	
2012	Richard's Wedding	Yes	Yes	Yes	Yes	Tuna	
2012	Red Flag				Yes	Henry	
2014	Summer of Blood	Yes	Yes	Yes	Yes	Erik Sparrow	
2014	Red Right Return				Yes	Jack	
2014	Ping Pong Summer				Yes	Boardwalk Artist	
2015	Abby Singer/Songwriter	Yes		Yes	Yes	Onur	
2015	Applesauce	Yes		Yes	Yes	Ron	
2016	Catfight	Yes		Yes			
2017	Infinity Baby			Yes			
2017	The Misogynists	Yes		Yes			
2021	Scenes from an Empty Church	Yes	Yes	Yes			
2021	That Cold Dead Look in Your Eyes	Yes	Yes	Yes			
2021	Have a Nice Life				Yes	Conner	
2022	The Third Saturday in October				Yes	Warden Haskins	
2023	Poundcake	Yes		Yes	Yes		
2025	Wooden Hearts	Yes		Yes	Yes	The Hitchhiker	
