= Keiichi Suzuki =

Japanese composer (born 1951)

Keiichi Suzuki 鈴木 慶一
- Born: August 28, 1951 (age 75); Tokyo, Japan
- Occupations: Musician; composer; singer; record producer; actor
- Years active: 1970–present
- Website: keiichisuzuki.com

Keiichi Suzuki (鈴木 慶一, Suzuki Keiichi; born August 28, 1951) is a Japanese composer, singer, and record producer. He co-founded the rock band Moonriders and is best known known outside of Japan for his musical contributions to the video games Mother (1989) and EarthBound (1994), both of which have been released on several soundtracks. More recently, he has composed film scores including The Blind Swordsman: Zatōichi (2003), Tokyo Godfathers (2003), Uzumaki (2000), Chicken Heart (2009), as well as Takeshi Kitano's Outrage trilogy.

== Career ==
Suzuki was born in Tokyo, Japan, the son of actor Akio Suzuki. He has a younger brother, Hirobumi Suzuki. In the early 1970s, Keiichi became involved with the Japanese band Hachimitsu Pie, who released one album in 1973. Later in the 1970s, Suzuki functioned as the occasional leader and regular singer of the Moonriders — the group's first album was in fact credited to "Keiichi Suzuki and the Moonriders ". The band included his brother Hirobumi on bass. Afterward, he collaborated with Yellow Magic Orchestra co-founder Yukihiro Takahashi as the duo The Beatniks. He was also a member of the trio Three Blind Moses.

As an actor, Suzuki appeared in the 1980s films; Body Drop Asphalt, Shunji Iwai's Swallowtail, and Love Letter, as well as other films from the late 1990s and early 2000s.

In 1989, Suzuki cowrote the soundtrack to the video game EarthBound Beginnings/Mother. In 1994, he would write more music for the game's sequel, EarthBound/Mother 2. A few years after EarthBound/Mother 2, Suzuki provided the music for the audio game Real Sound: Kaze no Regret.

His song "Satellite Serenade" was remixed by The Orb and was later featured on Sasha & Digweed's Northern Exposure and The Orb's Auntie Aubrey's Excursions Beyond the Call of Duty compilation.

In February 2008, Suzuki released a new solo album Captain Hate & First Mate Love in collaboration with Keiichi Sokabe, touring together in late spring 2008. The follow-up Pirate Radio Seasick appeared in 2009, and the third part In Retrospect in January 2011.

== Influences ==
Suzuki cited John Lennon of the Beatles, the Beach Boys, Van Dyke Parks, Andy Partridge of XTC, Godley & Creme, Miklos Rozsa, and Harry Nilsson as influences, particularly on the tracks he composed for the Mother series.

== Discography ==
=== with Hachimitsu-Pie ===
- Sentimental Dohri (センチメンタル通り "Sentimental Street")(1973)
- Beibyilon (Baby-Lon) (2017, Morio Agata & Hachimitsu-Pie)

=== with Moonriders ===
1. MOONRIDERS (1977)
2. Istanbul mambo (1977)
3. NOUVELLES VAGUES (1978)
4. MODERN MUSIC (1979)
5. CAMERA EGAL STYLO (1980)
6. Aozora Hyakkei (青空百景 "100 spectacular views of the blue sky") (1982)
7. MANIA MANIÈRA (1982)
8. AMATEUR ACADEMY (1984)
9. ANIMAL INDEX (1985)
10. DON'T TRUST OVER THIRTY (1986)
11. Christ, Who's gonna die first? (最後の晩餐)(1991)
12. A.O.R. (1992)
13. Moonriders No Yoru (ムーンライダーズの夜 "Night of the Moonriders")(1995)
14. Bizarre Music For You (1996)
15. GetsuMen Sanka (月面賛歌 "Lunar anthem")(1998)
16. dis-covered (1999)
17. Dire Morons TRIBUNE (2001)
18. P.W Babies Paperback (2005)
19. MOON OVER the ROSEBUD (2006)
20. Tokyo7 (2009)
21. Ciao! (2011)
22. it's the moooonriders (2022)
23. e.d morrison (2026)

=== The SUZUKI (with his brother Hirobumi Suzuki) ===
- The Suzuki meets GREAT SKIFFLE AUTREY（1990）
- The Suzuki ’95（1995）
- The Suzuki meets 栗コーダーカルテット（1998）

=== No Lie-Sense (with Keralino Sandorovich) ===
- First Suicide Note (2013)
- JAPAN'S PERIOD (2016)
- 駄々録〜Dadalogue (2020)

=== Controversial Spark ===
- After Intermission (2019)

=== Suzuki-Matsuwo (with Kiyonori Matsuo) ===
- One Hit Wonder（2023）

=== Solo studio albums ===
- Hinotama Boy (火の玉ボーイ) (1976, Keiichi Suzuki and the Moonriders)
- S.F. (1978), (宇宙からの物体X)
- Suzuki White-Report (Suzuki白書) (1991)
- Tokyo Taro Is Living in Tokyo (1993, as Tokyo Taro)
- Satelliteserenade (1994) – as Suzuki K1 >> 7.5cc
- Yes, Paradise, Yes | M.R.B.S.(1999) – as Suzuki K1 >> 7.5cc
- No.9 (2004) – with Moonriders
- Captain Hate & First Mate Love (ヘイト船長とラヴ航海士) (2008)
- Pirate Radio, Seasick' (シーシック・セイラーズ登場!) (2009)
- In Retrospective (ヘイト船長回顧録 ラヴ航海士抄) (2011)
- Keiichi Suzuki: Music for Films and Games (2010, Soundtracks Compilation)
- Records and Memories (2015)
- Mother Music Revisited (2021)

=== Video games ===
Title	Notes
EarthBound Beginnings/Mother	with Hirokazu Tanaka
EarthBound/Mother 2	with Hirokazu Tanaka, Hiroshi Kanazu, and Toshiyuki Ueno
Real Sound: Kaze no Regret	
Mother 1+2	with Hirokazu Tanaka, Hiroshi Kanazu, and Toshiyuki Ueno
Super Smash Bros. Brawl	Original game supervisor
Super Smash Bros. for Nintendo 3DS and Wii U	Original game supervisor
Super Smash Bros. Ultimate	Original game supervisor

== Filmography ==
=== Film ===
- Swallowtail Butterfly (1996)
- Uzumaki (2000)
- The Blind Swordsman: Zatōichi (2003)
- Tokyo Godfathers (2003)
- Chicken Heart (2009)
- For the Plasma (2014)
- His (2020)
- Last Letter (2020)
- Just Remembering (2022), Nagura
- Call Me Chihiro (2023), old musician
- Plastic (2023)
- Kyrie (2023)
- Ghost Cat Anzu (2024), buddhist monk (voice)
- Paradise of Solitude (2024)
- Gosh!! (2025)
- BAUS: The Ship's Voyage Continues (2025), Takuo
- 1st Kiss (2025)
- Spirit World (2025)

=== Television ===
- Bullets, Bones and Blocked Noses (2021), Shimura
