= International Film Awards Berlin =

German film festival

International Film Awards Berlin, often shortened to ifab, is an annual film festival held in the city of Berlin, Germany. The festival was established in 2012.

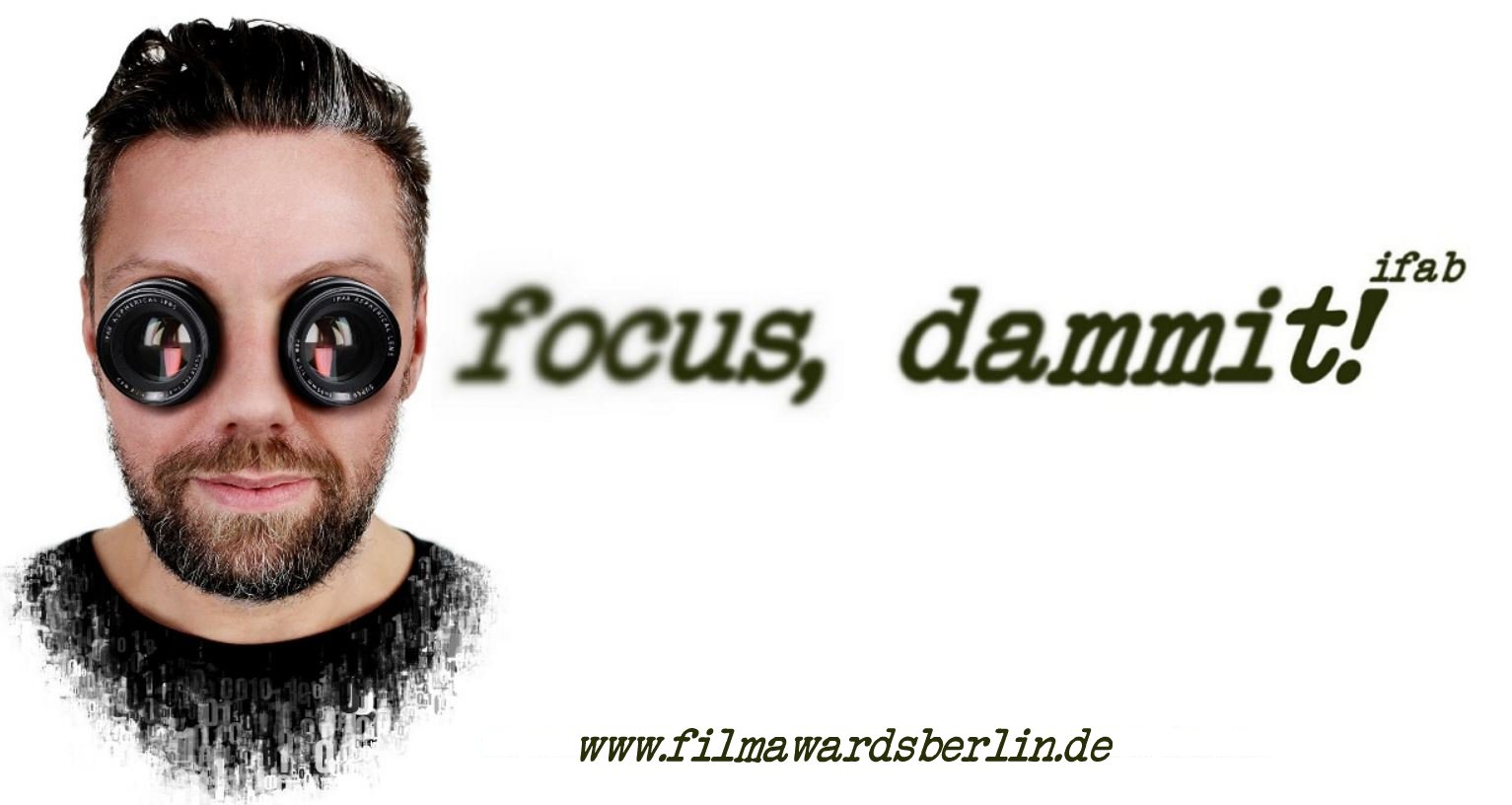
Official logo of the International Film Awards Berlin, ifab.

Ifab was founded to promote and support the creation and distribution of quality independent filmmaking, striving to recognize excellence and diversity in cinema and to promote expression for filmmakers at all stages of their artistic careers. Founded as a non-profit organization the ifab is dedicated to the preservation and support of independent cinema. Each year the Festival Board seeks diverse selection that will decorate unknown, talented filmmakers. The ifab was founded in 2013 by Philipp and Annett Müller-Dorn.

The first ifab took place in 2013 at the Sputnick Moviehouse in Kreuzberg. For the 2014 edition the ifab moved to the Filmkunst 66 Movie Theater in Berlin-Charlottenburg. It was held from September 3 to 7, 2014. In 2015 the ifab was held from September 22 to 25 at the Kino im Kulturhaus Spandau, and returned to this venue until 2017.

The International Film Awards Berlin culminates in the presentation of several awards, including the Grand Prize: the Brandenburg Gate Award.

== 2015 ifab winners ==
Best Animated Film ifab Award: How Murray Saved Christmas (directed by Mike Reiss)

Best Animated Short ifab Award: The Distant Touch (directed by Jun Chen)

Best Narrative Ultra Short (5 Minutes or shorter): Golden (directed Kai Stänicke)

Best Narrative Short ifab Award: The song of seashore (directed by Long Yang)

Best Documentary Feature ifab Award: OYAKO (directed by Toshi Inomata)

Best Junior Performance ifab Award: Faimida Shaik (Jaya)

Best Actress ifab Award: Ceci Chuh (Sin & Illy Still Alive)

Best Actor ifab Award: Jules Sitruk (Bob et les Sex Pistaches)

Best Cinematography ifab Award: Fade to Black (Oliver Milne)

ifab Special Jury Award: Mirrors to Windows – The Artist as Woman (directed by Susan Steinberg)

Best Screenplay ifab Award: Bob et les Sex Pistaches (Yves Matthey and Daniel Vouillamoz)

Best Director ifab Award: Bob et les Sex Pistaches (Yves Matthey)

Best Movie - ifab Brandenburg Gate Award: Bob et les Sex Pistaches (directed by Yves Matthey)

== 2014 ifab winners ==
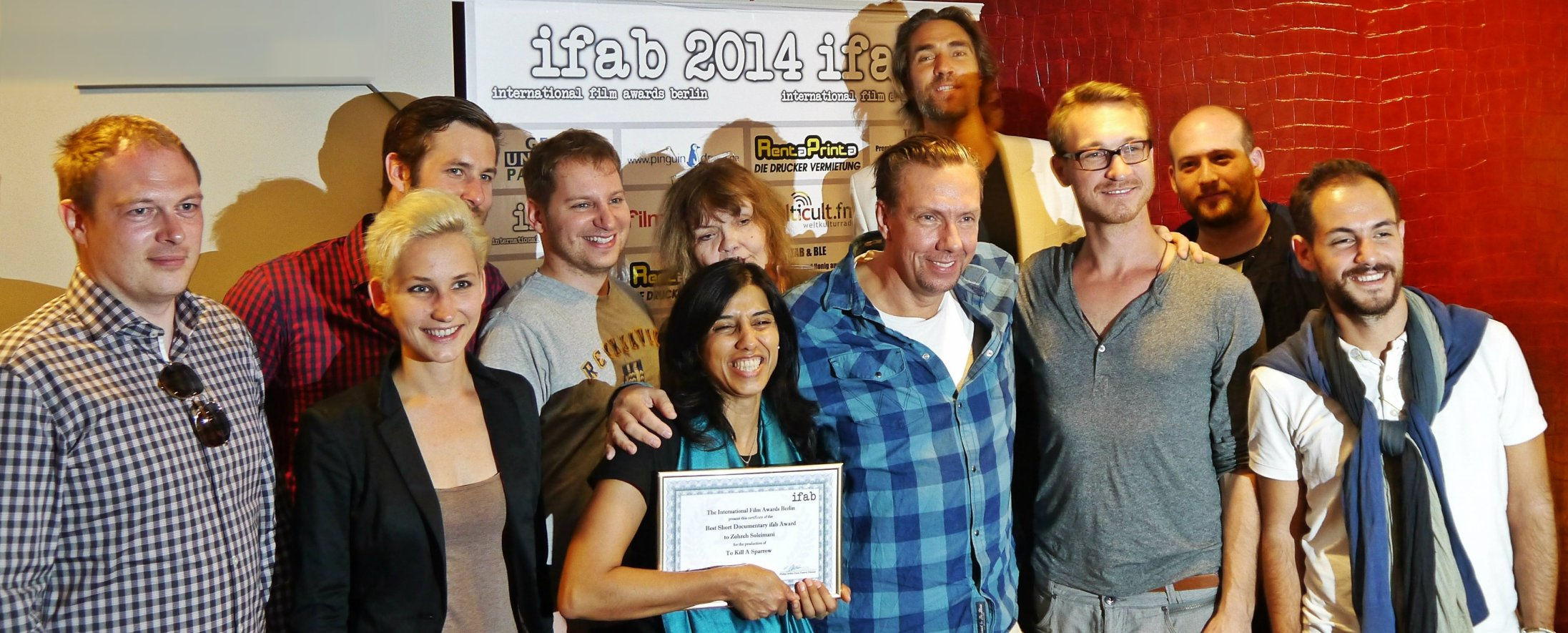
Filmmakers at the 2014 ifab award show

Best Animated Film ifab Award: Dick Figures: The Movie (directed by Ed Skudder & Zack Keller)

Best Animated Short ifab Award: Abschied (directed by Dominik Schmitt)

Best Narrative Ultra Short (5 Minutes or shorter): Maybe Another Time (directed by Khris Burton)

Best Narrative Short ifab Award: Hsu Jii – Behind the Screen (directed by Thomas Rio)

Best Documentary Feature ifab Award: Momento (directed by Steffen Boseckert)

Best Documentary Short ifab Award: To Kill A Sparrow (directed by Zohreh Soleimani)

Best Actress ifab Award: See You Next Tuesday (Eleanore Pienta)

Best Actor ifab Award: The Hyperglot (Michael Levi Harris)

Best Cinematography ifab Award: Gustav (Anders Brekke Jorgensen)

Best Comedy ifab Award: The Hyperglot (directed by Michael Urie)

Best Screenplay ifab Award: See You Next Tuesday (Drew Tobia)

Best Director ifab Award: The Curse of Edgar (Marc Dugain)

Best Movie - ifab Brandenburg Gate Award: See You Next Tuesday (directed by Drew Tobia)

== 2013 ifab winners ==
Best Animated Film ifab Award: Adam Floeck – Legacy

Best Narrative Ultra Short (5 Minutes or shorter): Hussain Al-Riffaei – Voices

Best Narrative Short ifab Award: Jonathan Langager – Josephine and the Roach

Best Documentary Feature ifab Award: Jason DaSilva – When I Walk

Best Actress ifab Award: Dana Mikhail – Sur Ton Sein

Best Actor ifab Award: Casey Chapman – Mother's Milk

Best Cinematography ifab Award: David Bravo – Sal

Best Screenplay ifab Award: Aleksander Nordhaas – Thale

Best Director ifab Award: Edward Pionke – Mother's Milk

Best Movie – ifab Brandenburg Gate Award: Faraj Aoun – Sur Ton Sein
