= Uncle Kent =

- Directed by: Joe Swanberg
- Written by: Kent Osborne; Joe Swanberg
- Produced by: Kent Osborne; Joe Swanberg
- Starring: Kent Osborne; Jennifer Prediger; Josephine Decker; Joe Swanberg; Kevin Bewersdorf
- Cinematography: Joe Swanberg
- Edited by: Joe Swanberg
- Music by: Kevin Bewersdof; Lane Hughes
- Distributed by: IFC Films
- Release date: January 2011
- Running time: 72 minutes
- Country: United States
- Language: English

Uncle Kent is a 2011 American film directed by Joe Swanberg and written by Kent Osborne and Swanberg. The film stars Osborne in the title role of Kent, and Jennifer Prediger, Josephine Decker, Kevin Bewersdof, and Swanberg. The film premiered at the Sundance Film Festival on January 21, 2011 and was released through video on demand the same day.

== Synopsis ==
Kent Osborne is a forty-year-old single animator who meets Kate, a New York journalist, through Chatroulette. Kate accepts Kent's invitation to visit L.A. for the weekend. Kate reveals that her heart belongs to another man. Frustrated, Kent attempts to make sense of the situation.

== Cast ==
- Kent Osborne as Kent
- Jennifer Prediger as Kate
- Josephine Decker as Josephine
- Joe Swanberg as Joe
- Kevin Bewersdorf as Kev

== Release ==
On December 2, 2010, it was announced IFC Films had acquired all distribution rights to the film. The film premiered at the Sundance Film Festival and was released through video on demand on January 21, 2011. The film was then selected to screen at the Stockholm International Film Festival on November 9, 2011.

== Sequel ==
A sequel to the film titled Uncle Kent 2, written by Kent Osborne and directed by Todd Rohal, had its world premiere at SXSW on March 13, 2015. The film's distribution rights were acquired by Factory25. The film had a limited release in 2016, and was also made available through video on demand that year.
