= Triggered (book) =

2019 book by Donald Trump Jr.

Triggered: How the Left Thrives on Hate and Wants to Silence Us
- First edition cover
- Author: Donald Trump Jr.
- Audio read by: James Edward Thomas; Donald Trump Jr.
- Language: English
- Subjects: American Left; Political correctness Presidency of Donald Trump
- Publisher: Center Street
- Publication date: November 5, 2019
- Publication place: United States
- Media type: Print (hardcover)
- Pages: 304
- ISBN: 978-1-5460-8603-1
- OCLC: 1124929393
- Dewey Decimal: 973.933
- LC Class: JK2316 .T88 2019

Triggered: How the Left Thrives on Hate and Wants to Silence Us is the debut book by Donald Trump Jr. It was published on November 5, 2019, by Center Street, a division of Hachette Book Group.

The book debuted at number one on the New York Times nonfiction bestseller list, though the Times said "institutional, special interest, group or bulk purchases" of the book comprised a significant part of its sales. However, according to CNN, Triggered would have topped the Times's list either way.

== Summary ==
The book is critical of political correctness, and argues that the American Left has a victimhood complex. In the book, Trump Jr. alleges that those identifying with the Left frequently employ a combination of victimization and bullying to advance their views. He suggests ways of defending one's (conservative) principles so as to not acquiesce to supposed Leftist intimidation and coercion. Specifically, Trump Jr. advances theories about how the intelligence community has attempted to harm President Trump, comparing President Trump's experiences with those of civil rights leader Martin Luther King Jr., who was targeted by an FBI COINTELPRO harassment campaign. Trump Jr. also writes about a visit to Arlington National Cemetery, stating that he got emotional looking at the graves and that the experience reminded him of "all the sacrifices" the Trump family had made, including "voluntarily giving up a huge chunk of our business and all international deals to avoid the appearance that we were 'profiting off of the office.'"

== Publication and promotion ==
On May 22, 2019, it was announced that Trump Jr. signed a book deal with Center Street. The book's title, release date and cover were announced on July 22, 2019. Triggered was published on November 5, 2019, by Center Street, a division of Hachette Book Group. A book signing tour began on November 5, 2019, in Scottsdale, Arizona.

In an October 2019 conference call, Trump Jr. unveiled a website titled "Trigger a Lib" where fans can purchase a copy of Triggered to be sent to a number of politicians, including Hillary Clinton, Nancy Pelosi, Adam Schiff, Alexandria Ocasio-Cortez, Ilhan Omar and Mitt Romney.

=== Sales ===
On the day of its publication, the book became a bestseller on Amazon, placing at number 3 behind Diary of a Wimpy Kid: Wrecking Ball (2) and A Warning (1), the latter of which was also published by an imprint of Hachette.

The book debuted at number one on the New York Times nonfiction bestseller list for the week ending November 9, 2019. The book's entry on the list included a dagger (†) beside it, indicating "institutional, special interest, group or bulk purchases." A week earlier, it was reported by Zeke Miller of the Associated Press that the Republican National Committee (RNC) was giving away signed copies of the book to donors, which helps to boost reported book sales. Upon its inclusion on The New York Times' list, the Associated Press reported that a spokesman for the RNC indicated they bought copies of the book "to keep up with demand" and denied they purchased them in a "large bulk purchase."

Nicholas Confessore, a reporter for The New York Times, acquired a Federal Election Commission filing showing the RNC spent $94,800 to purchase copies of the book one week prior to its release and that they offered a signed copy to anyone donating at least $50 to Donald Trump's reelection campaign. The New York Times also discovered that at least nine other Republican organizations, candidates, and other organizations like Turning Point USA with ties to the Trump family had made bulk purchases of the book.

According to CNN, Triggered would still have topped the Times's list without the RNC's purchase.

=== The View appearance ===
On November 7, 2019, Trump Jr. appeared with his girlfriend Kimberly Guilfoyle on the talk show The View. They appeared on the show's 5,000th episode to promote Triggered, seated alongside hosts Whoopi Goldberg, Abby Huntsman, Joy Behar, Meghan McCain and Sunny Hostin. The exchange devolved into "cross-talk" as the hosts grilled Trump Jr. with questions pertaining to the Trump–Ukraine scandal, including Huntsman asking Trump Jr. why he had posted the name of the supposed whistleblower to his Twitter. The discussion further fell into "chaos" when Trump Jr. accused Behar of wearing blackface and accused The View's network, ABC, of covering up for Jeffrey Epstein. Trump Jr. also accused Goldberg of defending film director and convicted rapist Roman Polanski.

Poppy Noor of The Guardian wrote a piece about the episode suggesting Trump Jr. intended to "start a fight over political correctness" to create "perfectly predictable viral content" and wrote, "we need to stop making it so easy for [President Donald Trump] to get to us. His fans will be brimming with glee at his son's performance." Lorraine Ali, a television critic for the Los Angeles Times, described the episode as emblematic of "America's kitchen table" and said, "Sometimes, when you disagree about politics with your nearest and dearest, you just have to have it out." Charlie Kirk, in an opinion published in Newsweek, defended Trump Jr. and called the hosts hypocritical.

=== UCLA event ===
On November 10, 2019, Trump Jr. appeared at a speaking event in Westwood, Los Angeles hosted by Turning Point USA to promote Triggered at the University of California, Los Angeles (UCLA), seated alongside Kimberly Guilfoyle and Charlie Kirk in UCLA's Moore Hall. The event was attended by over 400 people and protested by dozens of planned demonstrations from Refuse Fascism, the Revolution Club UCLA, the Afrikan Student Union at UCLA and Young Democratic Socialists of America. Before the event, Turning Point announced that the questions and answers (Q&A) segment of the speaking engagement was cancelled due to time constraints. Trump Jr. was greeted with chants of "USA". However, the event was marred by shouting and heckling from both protesters and supporters, which increased when it was mentioned that the Q&A segment was cancelled. Trump Jr. argued that his answers to audience members could be taken out of context by the media and the Internet. The audience responded by chanting "Q and A" repeatedly in hopes of Trump Jr. and Guilfoyle answering questions but the two left the stage moments later.

== Parodies ==
Satirical mashup of the slip cover at Barnes & Noble, New York City

Triggered was mocked after its book cover became a meme online when Parker Molloy posted a blank template of the cover on Twitter, inviting others to fill in their own title and tagline. On November 7, 2019, comedians Jason Selvig and Davram Stiefler replaced the slip covers at a Barnes & Noble in New York City, changing the book's title to "Daddy, Please Love Me: How Everything I Do Is Try to Earn My Father's Love".

Full Frontal with Samantha Bee created a website titled "Trigger A Troll" in response to Trump Jr.'s "Trigger a Lib" website. The website uses an identical design to "Trigger a Lib" and allows individuals to make monetary donations under the name of Rudy Giuliani to the Government Accountability Project, Brett Kavanaugh to the Rape, Abuse & Incest National Network, Betsy DeVos to DonorsChoose, Stephen Miller to the American Civil Liberties Union, Mike Pence to The Trevor Project and Ted Cruz to Moms Demand Action.

== Reception ==
Lloyd Green of The Guardian called the book "one-eyed, loose with the facts and a crude attack on the left," having "little to say about the sentinels of the right, starting with his father". He also wrote that Obama and Trump Jr.'s criticism of "the left's social justice warriors for their paroxysms of wokeness" are accurate, and that the book should be read "as the opening salvo of the Trump child with real political chops" and "a better campaign biography than most".

Ashley Feinberg of Slate panned the book, criticizing its "excruciatingly insecure prose" and writing that "parts may have genuinely been written by Don Jr. himself" since "some of the errors are so ludicrous they couldn't possibly have come from anyone else". Feinberg described the examples of Trump Jr. citing a statistic from the anti-immigration organization Federation for American Immigration Reform (FAIR) but confusing it with the progressive media watchdog Fairness and Accuracy in Reporting (FAIR), and being duped by a student's satirical op-ed in the Yale Daily News.

Publishers Weekly wrote that the book is aimed exclusively at Trump loyalists and that "Trump Jr. delivers the snarky yet polished self-portrait he's been honing at his father's rallies and on Twitter for years".

Reis Thebault of The Washington Post criticized Trump Jr. for hypocrisy in Triggered, writing, "In it, Trump Jr. writes, "A victimhood complex has taken root in the American left." Yet, in his telling, the real victim is often him, his father or another Trump family member."

John Haltiwanger from Business Insider characterized the book as "a lengthy rant about how his family has been victimized by Trump's presidency".

Washington Post book critic Carlos Lozada panned the book as both failing "as memoir and as polemic: Its analysis is facile, its hypocrisy relentless, its self-awareness marginal," and its writing as "wretched, even by the standards of political vanity projects". He called Trump a "second-generation dynastic hopeful" following in his father's footsteps with "familiar Trump put-downs, talking points, omissions and pats on the back" and by denouncing the news media.
