= Stephen Gurewitz =

American film director

- Occupations: Film director, actor, film editor

Stephen Gurewitz is an American film director, actor, and film editor.

== Career ==
He is best known as part of the 2010s American indie cinema movement with his breakthrough work Marvin, Seth and Stanley also starring Girls co-star Alex Karpovsky. In his review for The New York Times, critic Neil Genzlinger concluded "we never do get to know Marvin or Stanley very well." In his review for The New Yorker, critic Richard Brody deemed the picture "not to be missed" and said of Gurewitz's performance that it "brings the torment of quiet desperation and the pride of frustration to life with great humanity."

Gurewitz is a noted antiquer. His resemblance to Sean Penn has also been noted.
