= For the Plasma =

Indie science fiction film by Bingham Bryant and Kyle Molzan

- Theatrical release poster
- Directed by: Bingham Bryant; Kyle Molzan
- Written by: Bingham Bryant
- Produced by: Andrew Adair; Tyler Brodie; Jake Perlin; Kate West
- Starring: Anabelle LeMieux; Rosalie Lowe
- Cinematography: Christopher Messina
- Edited by: Bingham Bryant; Kyle Molzan
- Music by: Keiichi Suzuki
- Production companies: Artists Public Domain; Cochin Moon Productions
- Distributed by: Factory 25
- Release dates: June 21, 2014 (BAMcinemaFest); July 22, 2016 (VOD)
- Running time: 94 minutes
- Country: United States
- Language: English

For the Plasma is a 2014 American independent science fiction film directed by Bingham Bryant and Kyle Molzan.

== Synopsis ==
Two friends from days gone by, reconnect in an odd home by the sea. Although their occupation is to lookout for forest fires, Helen (Rosalie Lowe) has discovered her real job might be in analyzing the global financial market. Tensions arise when her new assistant, Charlie (Anabelle LeMieux), has issues finding meaning in their endeavors.

== Cast ==
- Anabelle Lemieux as Charlie
- Rosalie Lowe as Helen
- Tom Lloyd
- James Han
- Ryohei Hoshi
- Erica Jennifer Hill

== Reception ==
On the review aggregator Rotten Tomatoes, the film holds an approval rating of 59%, based on 17 reviews, with an average rating of 5.4/10. Metacritic assigned the film a weighted average score of 51 out of 100, based on 10 critics, indicating "mixed or average reviews".

Richard Brody of The New Yorker praised the cinematography and direction, saying: "The movie’s visual prose, aided by simple but fanciful camera work, has an original, giddy spin; Bryant and Molzan’s smooth and floaty direction sublimates the rocky landscape into something disturbingly ethereal."
