= Dana Eskelson =

American actress

- Occupation: Actress
- Years active: 1991–present

Dana Eskelson is an American television, film, and theatre actress.

Raised in Brick Township, New Jersey, Eskelson attended Brick Memorial High School.

== Filmography ==
- Past Midnight (1991)
- Singles (1992)
- To Sir, with Love II (1996)
- Exiled: A Law & Order Movie (TV, 1998)
- Cold Creek Manor (2003)
- Griffin & Phoenix (2006) as Mother with Stroller
- The Brave One (2007)
- Peter and Vandy (2009)
- The Company Men (2010)
- Deep Powder (2013) as Michelle
- See You Next Tuesday (2013) as May
- True Story (2015) as Mrs. Longo
- Please Be Normal (2015) as Amy
- Emily & Tim (2015)
- Yellow Fever (2017)
- Madeline's Madeline (2018) as Lamo

== TV series ==
- New York Undercover (1997–98) (3 episodes as Nadine Jordan)
- Prince Street (1997) as Det. Diane Hoffman, Lead
- Whoopi (2003)
- Law & Order: Criminal Intent episode "Ill-Bred" as Paige Mullen (2004)
- Law & Order (2005), guest star
- Brotherhood (2006) (2 episodes as Dina Finnerty)
- Law & Order: Special Victims Unit episode "Futility" as Karen Leighton (2003) and "Web" as Ms. Winnock (2006)
- The Americans (Season 2, Episode 1 as Bernadette) (2013)
- The Good Wife episode "Invitation to an Inquest" (2013) as Bethany Bigelow
- Bull episode "Parental Guidance" (2019) as Brenda

== Theatre ==
- A Perfect Couple (2008)
- Massacre (Sing to Your Children) (2012)
