= Summer of Blood =

- Summer of Blood DVD cover
- Directed by: Onur Tukel
- Written by: Onur Tukel
- Produced by: Max Heller; Clifford McCurdy; Melodie Sisk; Onur Tukel
- Starring: Onur Tukel; Anna Margaret Hollyman; Dakota Goldhor; Jason Selvig; Dustin Guy Defa
- Cinematography: Jason Banker
- Edited by: Onur Tukel
- Distributed by: MPI Media Group
- Release date: April 17, 2014 (Tribeca Film Festival)
- Running time: 86 minutes
- Country: United States
- Language: English

Summer of Blood is a 2014 horror comedy vampire film written, edited, and directed by Onur Tukel. The film stars Tukel, Anna Margaret Hollyman, Dakota Goldhor, Jason Selvig, and Dustin Guy Defa.

== Plot ==
During an evening date, Eric Sparrow (Onur Tukel) crassly refuses a marriage proposal by his long suffering girlfriend Jody (Anna Margaret Hollyman). On the tense walk home, they run into Jody's college flame Jason (Jason Selvig), for whom Jody promptly ditches Eric. Now alone, Eric stumbles upon a man bleeding of a neck wound in an alley. Despite the man's pleas for help, Eric tactlessly jokes through the encounter until the man bleeds to death.

At work, Eric relentlessly pursues his uninterested coworker Penelope (Dakota Goldhor), all while continuously slacking at his job. After several failed attempts to reconnect with Jody, he goes on a series of three disastrous dates with Samantha (Vanna Pilgrim), Blake (Melodie Sisk), and Denise (Juliette Fairley).

While walking alone late one night, Eric is approached by a curious stranger named Gavin (Dustin Guy Defa). After forcing Eric to admit that he really wants to die, Gavin, revealed to be a vampire, bites Eric in the neck. The next day, Eric is found sleeping at his work in a shirt still stained in blood. He is promptly fired, having missed an important meeting earlier that morning.

That evening, Eric begins to suffer from strange pains and finds that he can no longer enjoy the taste of food or smoking cigarettes. In a graceless encounter, Eric bites and kills his first victim (Keith Poulson). Eric later reattempts dating Samantha, Blake, and Denise, sequentially seducing and transforming all three into vampires. Using his new powers of hypnosis, he also convinces his landlord Mr. Leiberman (Jerry Raik) to stop charging him rent. Eric again tries reconnecting with Jody, only to be punched in the face by Jason before biting his ankle in retaliation. Eric later runs into Gavin while attacking another victim, and the two exchange their views on God and the new reality they face as vampires.

Later, Jody surprisingly shows up at Eric's apartment to reconnect and the two share an intimate moment. Six months later, Eric and Jody are on their wedding night when Eric suddenly needs to feed. Jody asks Eric to bite her, but he refuses and goes out looking for blood. He runs into Penelope on the street and ends up turning her into a vampire instead. Eric arrives back at the hotel, but it turns out that Penelope followed him back. Eric and Jody proceed to argue about his fear of commitment, until Eric impulsively bites Jody. As Eric feeds, Penelope joins him and the two end up drinking too much of Jody's blood.

As Jody lies dying on the bed of the honeymoon suite, Eric and Penelope discuss the possibility of God. The two of them eventually engage in a disorderly prayer for Jody to improve and for all three of them to be normal people again. Just as they conclude, Jody, now a vampire herself, suddenly rises and demands the three of them make love.

== Cast ==
- Onur Tukel as Erik Sparrow
- Anna Margaret Hollyman as Jody
- Dakota Goldhor as Penelope
- Melodie Sisk as Blake
- Juliette Fairley as Denise
- Vanna Pilgrim as Samantha
- Jason Selvig as Jason
- Jerry Raik as Leiberman
- Keith Poulson as College Dropout
- Dustin Guy Defa as Gavin
- Alex Karpovsky as Coworker

== Production ==
Recalling his previously successful vampire film Drawing Blood, Tukel commented on the production of Summer of Blood:

After 15 years of making comedy after comedy and losing my investors' money, I thought, I made a vampire film years ago and we made money very quickly off that, let's try that again! What's beautiful about a vampire movie is that, with a $100 pair of contact lenses and a $20 pair of fangs, people will buy it. But we knew that with a title like Summer of Blood we had to deliver to genre fans so we did take those elements very seriously. We got a very good special effects guy and paid him not a lot of money but it was a good portion of our budget. I knew for the most part I could get by on jokes and performances, because I was surrounded by a really amazing cast, but if we didn't have at least a couple of really cool kills or blood scenes that it wouldn't work as a horror film.

== Release ==
Summer of Blood premiered at the Tribeca Film Festival on April 17, 2014.

=== Home media ===
The film was released on VOD and DVD through MPI Media Group November 11, 2014.

== Reception ==
=== Critical response ===
Summer of Blood received a mixed response from critics. It holds a 55% positive "Rotten" rating on the review aggregator Rotten Tomatoes.

Eric Kohn of Indiewire gave the film a B+ and called it a "hilarious satire," describing Tukel's Erik as possessing "contemptible goofiness" and being "the broke, post-9/11 version of an early Woody Allen character." Alan Scherstuhl of The Village Voice also compared the film favorably to the works of Woody Allen, describing Tukel's lead as "a furry schlump in stained business-casual, his cocksure smirk hidden behind a gray tumbleweed of beard. He's a creep who thinks he's Alvy Singer." Richard Brody The New Yorker also praised the "independent-scene all-star" supporting cast, particularly noting the "poised, commanding" Anna Margaret Hollyman as Jody and the "wildly inventive" Dakota Goldhor as Penelope.

Nicolas Rapold of The New York Times, however, was slightly less favorable, commenting "It's all mellowly funny rather than creepy, something like a stand-up conceit elaborated into scenes. But who would want to be stuck with this running monologue for eternity?" Kenji Fujishima of Slant Magazine gave the film a mixed two-and-a-half out of four stars, but nevertheless called it an improvement on Tukel's previous film and added, "Tukel is able to offer a reasonably fresh spin on familiar vampire-movie tropes, giving pitiless misanthropy pedal-to-the-metal comic wit."
