= Max Casella =

American actor (born 1967)

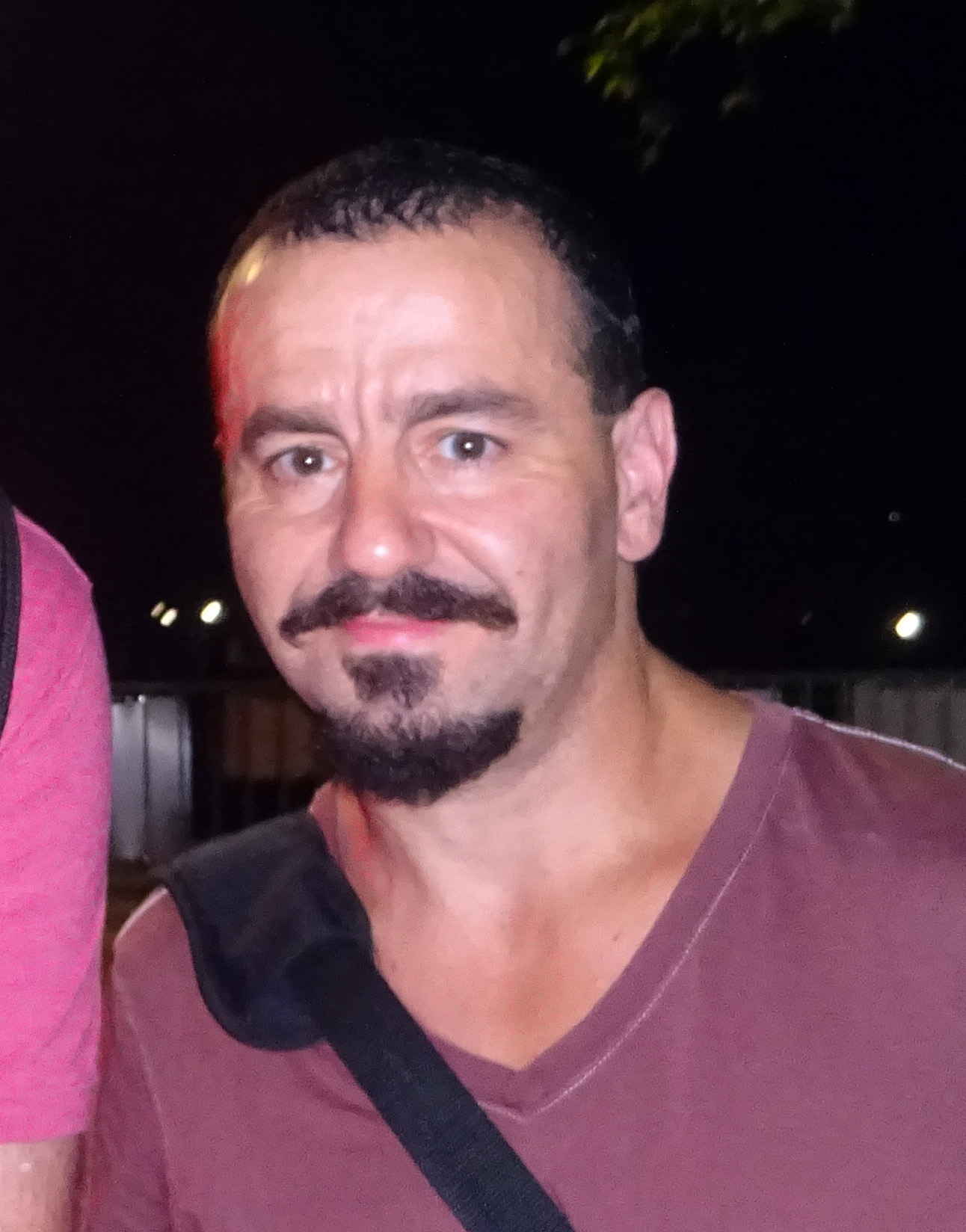
- Casella in 2016
- Born: Maximilian Deitch; June 6, 1967 (age 59); Washington, D.C., U.S.
- Occupation: Actor
- Years active: 1981–present
- Spouse: Leona Robbins (m. 2002; sep. 2018)
- Children: 2

Max Casella (born Maximilian Deitch; June 6, 1967) is an American actor. He is known for his roles on the television series Doogie Howser, M.D., The Sopranos, Boardwalk Empire, Vinyl, Cro and the voice of Daxter in the Jak and Daxter video game series.

== Early life ==
Casella was born June 6, 1967, in Washington, D.C., the son of David Deitch, a newspaper columnist, and Doris Casella, a social worker. His father is Jewish and his mother is of Italian descent. He grew up in Cambridge, Massachusetts and attended Cambridge Rindge and Latin School, where his classmates included Traci Bingham, Ben Affleck, and Matt Damon. Casella has growth hormone deficiency, which accounted for his ability to play characters much younger than his actual age. His brother also shares the condition. He did not go through puberty until the age of 27 after medical intervention. Casella was given testosterone. His physical changes caused him to gain weight and he was dropped by his agents. He then had to completely reinvent himself as an actor.

== Career ==
Casella played Vincent "Vinnie" Delpino in the television series Doogie Howser, M.D. from 1989 to 1993 with Neil Patrick Harris. In 1992, Casella played Racetrack Higgins in Newsies, which was based upon true events in the 1899 newsboys strike against Joseph Pulitzer and William Randolph Hearst. He appeared in WindRunner: A Spirited Journey, starring Margot Kidder and Russell Means as Jim Thorpe's ghost. In 1997, Casella played Timon in the original Broadway production of The Lion King; a performance for which he was awarded a Theatre World Award and received a Drama Desk Award nomination. From 2000 to 2001 he returned to Broadway as Marcellus Washburn in the revival of The Music Man. Casella portrayed Pvt. Dino Paparelli in Sgt. Bilko. He joined the cast of the HBO series The Sopranos during its third season, as Benny Fazio. Casella also starred in Ed Wood and Analyze This. In 2007, Casella portrayed Dick Howser in the ESPN mini-series The Bronx is Burning. He also voiced Tip in The Little Mermaid II: Return to the Sea, Zini in the CGI film Dinosaur and the titular character in ABC's Cro. In 2008, Casella played Mack Steiner in Leatherheads and Dennis, one of the main characters in Scaring the Fish. He also played Leo D'Alessio in season one of the HBO series Boardwalk Empire.

From 2022 to 2024, Casella portrayed Armand Truisi on the Paramount+ series Tulsa King.

== Personal life ==
Casella married Leona Robbins in 2002, and has two daughters, Mia and Gioia. They lived in New York City, and they separated in 2018.

== Filmography ==
=== Film ===
Year	Title	Role	Notes
1992	Newsies	Racetrack Higgins	
1994	Ed Wood	Paul Marco	
1996	Sgt. Bilko	Spc. Dino Paparelli	
1997	Trial and Error	Dr. Brown	
1999	Analyze This	Nicky Shivers	
1999	Freak Talks About Sex	Freak's High School Friend	
2000	The Little Mermaid II: Return to the Sea	Tip (voice)	Direct-to-video
2000	Dinosaur	Zini (voice)	
2005	The Notorious Bettie Page	Howie	
2006	Bristol Boys	Donny	
2008	Leatherheads	Max Steiner	
2008	Revolutionary Road	Ed Small	
2011	Big Mommas: Like Father, Like Son	Anthony Canetti	
2011	Somewhere Tonight	Fred	
2012	Killing Them Softly	Barry Caprio	
2013	Inside Llewyn Davis	Pappi Corsicato	
2013	Blue Jasmine	Eddie	
2013	The Last of Robin Hood	Stanley Kubrick	
2013	Fading Gigolo	Guy at Counter	
2013	Oldboy	James Prestley	
2015	Wild Card	Osgood	
2015	Applesauce	Les	
2015	Christmas Eve	Randy	
2016	Jackie	Jack Valenti	
2016	Live by Night	Digger Pescatore	
2017	Wonder Wheel	Ryan	
2018	Night Comes On	Mark	
2019	Late Night	Burditt	
2020	The Rhythm Section	Leon Giler	
2020	Paper Spiders	Gary	
2021	This Is the Night	Police Officer	Uncredited
2021	The Tender Bar	Chief	
2022	Allswell in New York	Tim	
2024	Lake George	Harout	
2026	Jimmy	Frank Capra	
TBA	Special Delivery	Man	Short; post-production

=== Television ===
Year	Title	Role	Notes
1983	Don't Look Now!	Max Deitch	3 episodes
1988	The Equalizer	Streak	Episode: "The Child Broker"
1989	Kate & Allie	Mike Sheridan	Episode: "Chip's Notes"
1989–1993	Doogie Howser, M.D.	Vinnie Delpino	97 episodes
1993–1994	Cro	Cro (voice)	20 episodes
1995	The Cosby Mysteries	Simon Cosler	Episode: "Comic Book Murder"
1995–1996	The Adventures of Hyperman	Studd Puppy (voice)	13 episodes
1996	Hey Arnold!	Tony B. / Philly D. (voices)	Episodes: "Benchwarmer/Cool Jerk"
1997	Pepper Ann	Emmit Swink (voice)	Episode: "Crunch Pod"
1998	Working	Quinten McCracken	Episode: "Greenery"
2001–2007	The Sopranos	Benny Fazio	28 episodes
2002	Law & Order: Criminal Intent	Nicky	Episode: "Shandeh"
2002	Courage the Cowardly Dog	The Beaver (voice)	Episode: "A Beaver's Tale"
2003	Queens Supreme	Christopher Schiffer	Episode: "Case by Case"
2007	The Bronx Is Burning	Dick Howser	4 episodes
2009	Medium	Joel Tiernan	Episode: "Soul Survivor"
2010	Hawaii Five-0	Joey	Episode: "Malama Ka Aina"
2010	Boardwalk Empire	Leo D'Alessio	7 episodes
2011	The Confession	Eddie	2 episodes
2016	Vinyl	Julian "Julie" Silver	Main cast; 10 episodes
2016	The Night Of	Edgar	Episode: "The Art of War"
2016	Crisis in Six Scenes	Barber	Episode #1.1
2017–2022	The Marvelous Mrs. Maisel	Michael Kessler	5 episodes
2017–2018	The Detour	Joe Delicious	13 episodes
2018	Shades of Blue	Capt. Daniel Pines	2 episodes
2018	Ray Donovan	Emerson Lake	6 episodes
2019	The Blacklist	Henry Morris	Episode: "Lady Luck (No. 69)"
2021	The Good Fight	Danny Trumpet	2 episodes
2022	WeCrashed	Detective Donny	Episode: "Masha Masha Masha"
2022–2024	Tulsa King	Armand Truisi	Main role (seasons 1–2); 19 episodes
2023	Kaleidoscope	Taco	Episode: "Pink" (6 Months After the Heist)
2026	Law & Order	Steven Delvecchio	Episode: "Once Burned"

=== Video games ===
Year	Title	Role
2001	Jak and Daxter: The Precursor Legacy	Daxter
2003	Jak II	Daxter
2004	Jak 3	Daxter
2005	Jak X: Combat Racing	Daxter
2006	Daxter	Daxter, Hotelier
2007	Pain	Daxter
2009	Jak and Daxter: The Lost Frontier	Daxter
2009	Grand Theft Auto: The Ballad of Gay Tony	Union Official
2011	PlayStation Move Heroes	Daxter
2012	PlayStation All-Stars Battle Royale	Daxter
