= Septien =

- Directed by: Michael Tully
- Written by: Michael Tully; Onur Tukel; Robert Longstreet
- Starring: Michael Tully; Onur Tukel; Robert Longstreet; Rachel Korine
- Cinematography: Jeremy Saulnier
- Edited by: Marc Vives
- Music by: Michael Montes
- Distributed by: IFC Films
- Release date: 2011
- Running time: 80 minutes
- Country: United States
- Language: English

Septien is a 2011 independent film directed by and starring Michael Tully. The film also stars Onur Tukel, Robert Longstreet, and Rachel Korine. Its narrative concerns the return of bearded athlete Cornelius Rawlings to his family's Tennessee farm eighteen years after he disappeared, and the strange new life he forms with his brothers Ezra and Amos.

== Cast ==
- Michael Tully as Cornelius Rawlings
- Onur Tukel as Amos Rawlings
- Robert Longstreet as Ezra Rawlings
- Rachel Korine as Savannah

== Release ==
Septien was premiered at the 2011 Sundance Film Festival, and subsequently screened within such festivals as BAFICI, International Film Festival Rotterdam, South by Southwest, Sarasota Film Festival, and Maryland Film Festival.

It was acquired for distribution by IFC Films.

== Reception ==
The film holds a 56% rating on the review aggregator Rotten Tomatoes.
