= Music of the Mother series =

Music of the Mother video game series

The Mother series is a role-playing video game series created by Shigesato Itoi for Nintendo. The series started in 1989 with the Japan-only release of Mother, which was followed up by Mother 2, released as EarthBound outside Japan, for the Super NES in 1994. A second sequel was released in Japan only, Mother 3, for the Game Boy Advance in 2006. The music of the Mother series includes the soundtracks to all three games; the first game was composed by Keiichi Suzuki and Hirokazu Tanaka, who were joined by Hiroshi Kanazu for the second game, while Mother 3's score was written by Shogo Sakai.The music has inspired several album releases. Mother saw the release in 1989 of an album primarily composed of vocal arrangements of pieces from its soundtrack; this album was re-released in 2004 in an expanded form. EarthBound had a soundtrack album associated with the game released in 1994 and again in 2004 that contained both original tracks from the game and medleys of multiple tracks. A compilation release, Mother 1+2, received a soundtrack album release in 2003, as well as an album of MIDI piano versions of songs from the two games in 2006. The latest release in the series, Mother 3, has two soundtrack albums: Mother 3+, released in 2006, and the online-only release Mother 3i in 2007.

The games' soundtracks have received primarily positive reviews, and the music itself has gone on to some popularity. Multiple piano sheet music books of pieces from the series have been produced, and the "Eight Melodies" song originally featured in Mother has been included in some Japanese music textbooks. Music from the series has been used in the Super Smash Bros. series of fighting games, has been played in orchestral game music concerts, and been remixed for websites such as OverClocked Remix.

== Mother/EarthBound Beginnings ==
Mother (マザー, Mazā), later re-released as EarthBound Beginnings, is a role-playing video game published by Nintendo for the Nintendo Entertainment System video game console in 1989. The game's soundtrack was composed by Keiichi Suzuki and Hirokazu Tanaka. Tanaka was a video game composer working for Nintendo who had previously composed for games such as Super Mario Land and Metroid, while Suzuki was a composer and musician for bands of many different genres. The NES was only able to play three notes at a time, which Suzuki has noted greatly limited what he was able to produce, as he could not create some of the sounds he wanted. Melodies and themes from some pieces from the soundtrack were reused in the other games in the series. "Pollyanna", "Snowman" and "Humoresque of a Little Dog" make an appearance in all three games.

Mother
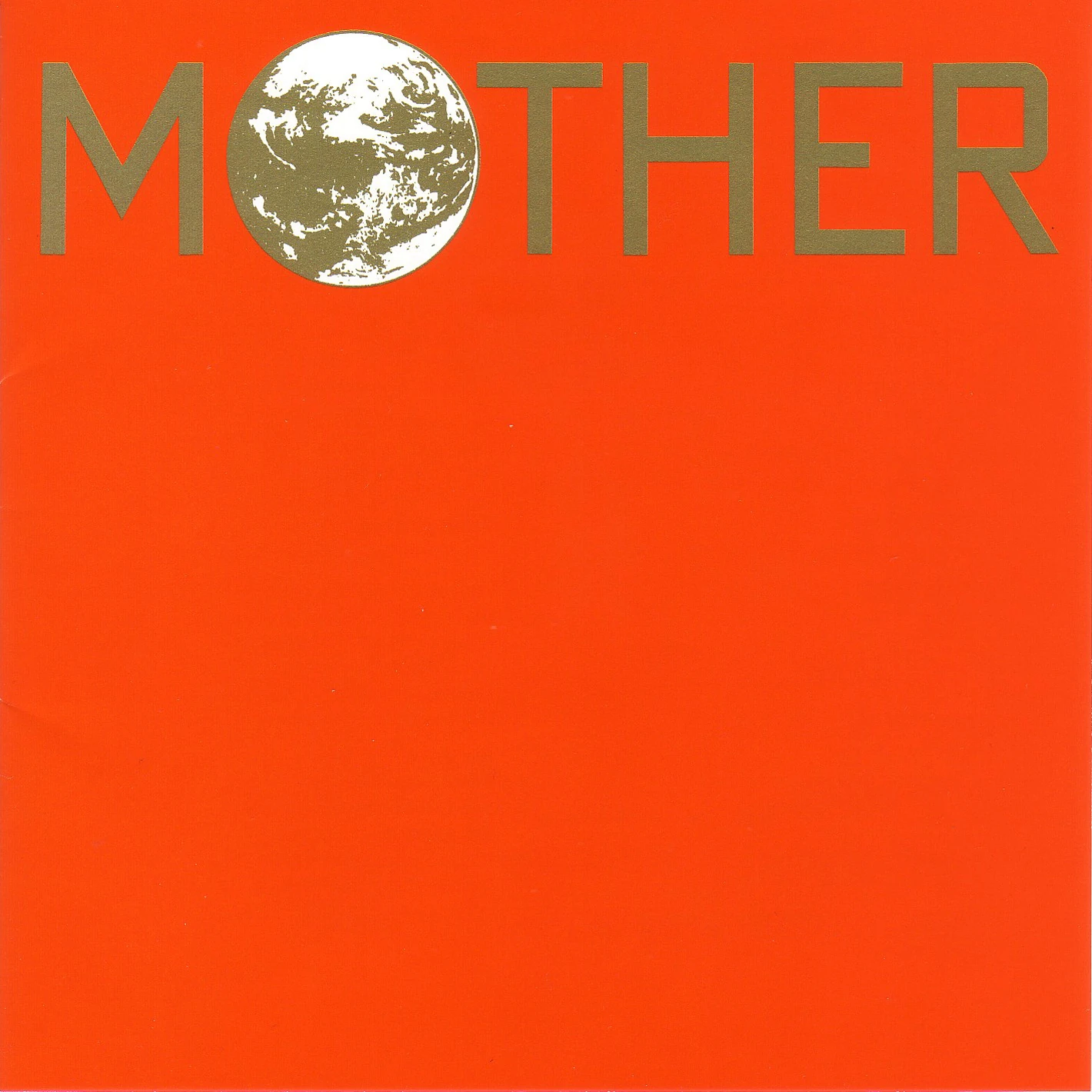

Soundtrack album by Keiichi Suzuki and Hirokazu Tanaka
- Released: August 21, 1989
- Recorded: Tokyo, Japan; London, England; Bath, Somerset, England
- Genres: Video game music, pop, gospel, chiptune
- Length: 1:03:47
- Label: CBS/Sony

Mother Music Revisited

Soundtrack album by Keiichi Suzuki
- Released: January 27, 2021
- Genre: Video game music
- Length: (Disc 1) 48:22 (Disc 2) 56:47
- Label: Nippon Columbia

"Eight Melodies"
A 32-second sample of the track, highlighting the album's vocal style and tone.

Some of the music from the game was recorded as a studio album by Suzuki and Tanaka in collaboration with various artists, entitled Mother. The album was released by CBS/Sony on August 21, 1989. It consists of eleven tracks, seven of which are English vocal arrangements of songs from the game created by Suzuki, Japanese violinist Takeshi "Neko" Saito and English composers David Bedford and Michael Nyman. The lyrics to these arrangements were written by Linda Hennrick. Each of the first ten tracks were performed by a different artist or group such as Catherine Warwick and St Paul's Cathedral Choir. The pieces were recorded at eight different studios in England, and a final 16-minute capstone track, "The World of Mother", included most of the tracks from the game itself played back to back in their order of appearance in the game. The album cover shows the word "MOTHER" in a shade of brown over a red background; the letter "O" of "MOTHER" is replaced by an image of planet Earth, also with a brownish tinge. The soundtrack was reissued on February 18, 2004, by Sony Music Direct with its tracks digitally remastered, a song from EarthBound entitled "Smiles and Tears" was added, and the track "The World of Mother" was replaced with a version that is six minutes longer.

Despite being recorded in England, the album was only available in Japan, as the game was never released outside of the country until a Virtual Console release over 25 years later. Following a Kickstarter campaign, the American independent record label Ship to Shore PhonoCo worked with Sony Music to reissue the album on vinyl record in 2015. Only 2,000 copies were pressed, though a limited run of CD albums was also produced.

Slugmag's Gavin Sheehan gave a positive review to the soundtrack. He noted the experimental style of the tracks, which he credited to the experimental style of the game itself as well as the relative newness of the genre of video game music at the time. Reviewer Patrick Gann of RPGFan received the album well, saying that he enjoyed the variety of genres presented in it, though he noted that the lyrics were "trite and cheesy", though still "catchy". He also applauded the production value, calling it "incredible, especially for 1989". Square Enix Music Online, in their review of the album, called it "a happy little gem with quirks and surprises". Unlike RPGFan they felt that the sound production quality was not as good as it could be, but they still felt that the pieces had "stood the test of time in terms of good music".

In 2021, Mother Music Revisited was released for CD, streaming, and vinyl, containing new versions of ten tracks from the game, arranged by Suzuki, recorded with live instruments, and featuring vocals by Suzuki. The CD and vinyl albums were released on January 27, with streaming versions released a week later. A deluxe version of the cd album includes a second disc containing the original Famicom tracks from the game; this disc was also previously released on vinyl on December 25, 2019.

Track list
No.	Title	Music	Artist	Length
1.	"Pollyanna (I Believe in You)"	Keiichi Suzuki	Catherine Warwick	3:42
2.	"Bein' Friends"	Suzuki	Catherine Warwick, Jeremy Holland-Smith	5:13
3.	"The Paradise Line"	Suzuki	Jeb Million	3:44
4.	"Magicant"	Hirokazu Tanaka		4:21
5.	"Wisdom of the World"	Suzuki	Catherine Warwick	4:42
6.	"Flying Man"	Suzuki	Louis Philippe	4:49
7.	"Snow Man"	Suzuki, Tanaka		3:51
8.	"All That I Needed (Was You)"	Suzuki	Jeremy Budd	4:43
9.	"Fallin' Love, and"	Tanaka		6:18
10.	"Eight Melodies"	Suzuki, Tanaka	St Paul's Cathedral Choir	5:46
11.	"The World of MOTHER"	Suzuki, Tanaka		16:32

2004 bonus tracks
No.	Title	Music	Length
11.	"The World of MOTHER (Extended)"	Suzuki, Tanaka	23:53
12.	"Smiles and Tears (Demo Track)"	Suzuki, Tanaka	4:47

Mother Music Revisited track list
No.	Title	Music	Length
1.	"Pollyanna (I Believe in You)"	Keiichi Suzuki	4:13
2.	"Bein' Friends"	Keiichi Suzuki	6:04
3.	"The Paradise Line"	Keiichi Suzuki	4:10
4.	"Magicant"	Keiichi Suzuki	4:32
5.	"Wisdom of the World"	Keiichi Suzuki	5:34
6.	"Flying Man"	Keiichi Suzuki	5:02
7.	"Snow Man"	Keiichi Suzuki	4:30
8.	"All That I Needed (Was You)"	Keiichi Suzuki	4:50
9.	"Fallin' Love, and"	Keiichi Suzuki	3:28
10.	"Eight Melodies"	Keiichi Suzuki	5:53

Mother Music Revisited Deluxe Disc 2 track list
No.	Title	Music	Length
1.	"MOTHER EARTH"	Hirokazu Tanaka	3:30
2.	"MY HOME/HOUSE THEME"	Keiichi Suzuki	1:10
3.	"POLTERGEIST"	Hirokazu Tanaka	0:43
4.	"POLLYANNA (I BELIEVE IN YOU)"	Keiichi Suzuki	1:50
5.	"BASEMENT/UNDERGROUND THEME"	Hirokazu Tanaka	1:38
6.	"BATTLE THEME 1/BATTLE WITH A FLIPPANT FOE"	Hirokazu Tanaka	1:20
7.	"BATTLE THEME 2/HIPPIE BATTLE"	Hirokazu Tanaka	1:19
8.	"BATTLE THEME 3/BATTLE WITH A DANGEROUS FOE"	Hirokazu Tanaka	1:50
9.	"HUMORESQUE OF A LITTLE DOG"	Hirokazu Tanaka	1:05
10.	"SOUTH CEMETERY/A GHASTLY SITE"	Hirokazu Tanaka	2:21
11.	"BEIN' FRIENDS"	Keiichi Suzuki	1:42
12.	"CHOUCREAM ZOO/ALIEN INVESTIGATION"	Hirokazu Tanaka	1:35
13.	"CAVE 1/CAVE OF THE TAIL"	Hirokazu Tanaka	0:44
14.	"MAGICANT"	Hirokazu Tanaka	2:38
15.	"WISDOM OF THE WORLD (QUEEN MARY'S CASTLE)"	Keiichi Suzuki	1:35
16.	"TWINKLE ELEMENTARY SCHOOL"	Hirokazu Tanaka	1:55
17.	"FACTORY THEME"	Hirokazu Tanaka	2:03
18.	"THE PARADISE LINE"	Keiichi Suzuki	2:21
19.	"SNOW MAN"	Keiichi Suzuki, Hirokazu Tanaka	1:57
20.	"ADVENT DESERT/YUCCA DESERT"	Hirokazu Tanaka	1:39
21.	"AIRPLANE RIDE"	Hirokazu Tanaka	1:33
22.	"ROVING TANK"	Hirokazu Tanaka	2:01
23.	"RUINS OF DESERT/MONKEY CAVE"	Keiichi Suzuki	1:17
24.	"EASTER/YOUNGTOWN"	Keiichi Suzuki, Hirokazu Tanaka	1:15
25.	"LIVE HOUSE"	Hirokazu Tanaka	0:53
26.	"ALL THAT I NEEDED (WAS YOU)"	Keiichi Suzuki	1:34
27.	"CAVE 2/APPROACHING MT. ITOI"	Hirokazu Tanaka	1:29
28.	"HOLY LOLY MOUNTAIN/MT. ITOI"	Hirokazu Tanaka	2:13
29.	"FALLIN' LOVE, AND"	Hirokazu Tanaka	1:54
30.	"THE TOMBSTONE/POLLYANNA"	Keiichi Suzuki	1:19
31.	"EIGHT MELODIES"	Keiichi Suzuki, Hirokazu Tanaka	1:17
32.	"VERSUS GIEGUE"	Hirokazu Tanaka	0:44
33.	"THE ENDING"	Keiichi Suzuki, Hirokazu Tanaka	4:10

== Mother 2/EarthBound ==
Mother 2: Gyiyg no Gyakushū
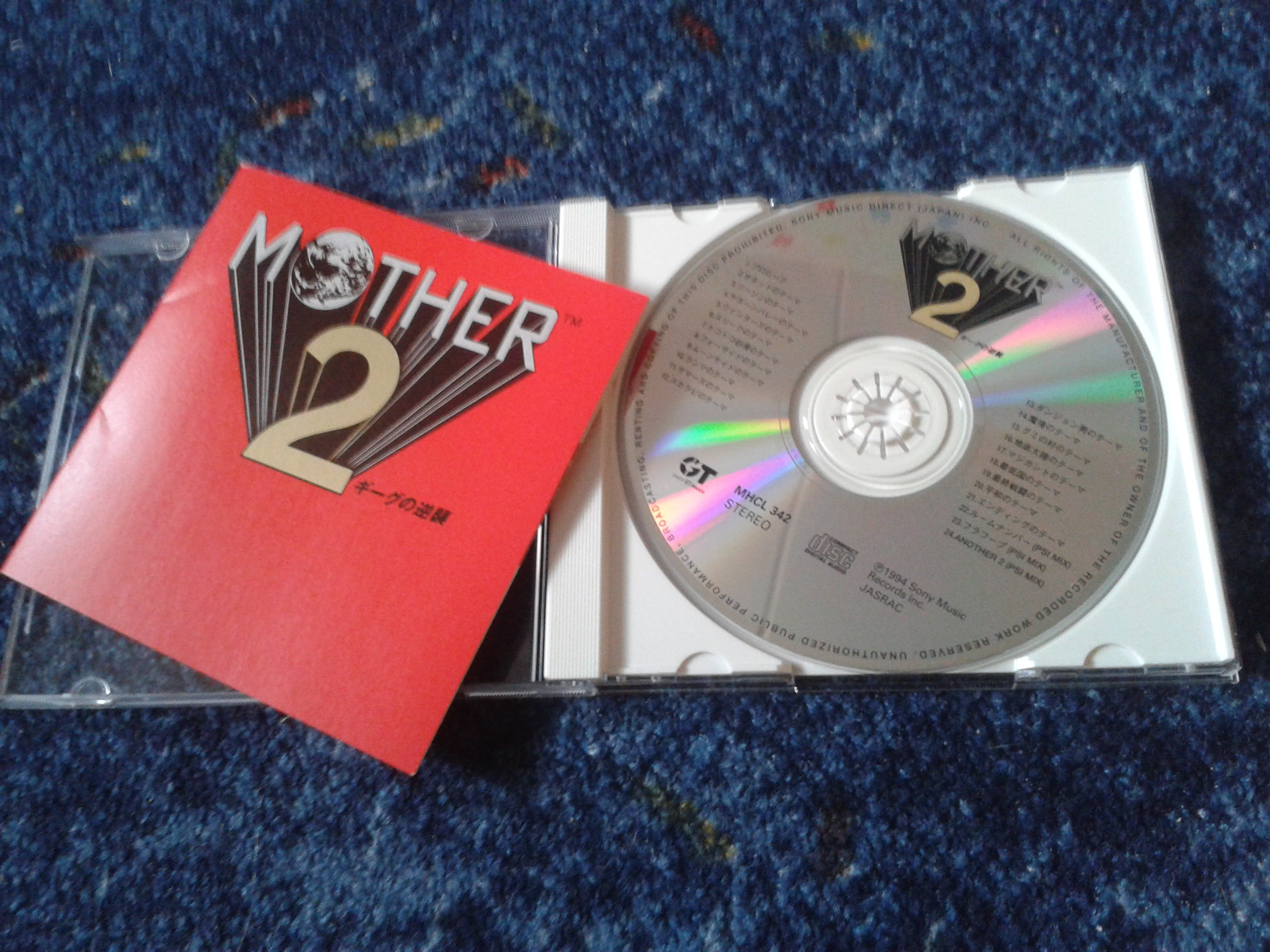

Soundtrack album by Keiichi Suzuki, Hirokazu Tanaka, and Hiroshi Kanazu
- Released: November 2, 1994; February 18, 2004
- Genre: Video game music
- Length: 59:49
- Label: Sony

EarthBound, known in Japan as Mother 2: Gyiyg no Gyakushū (MOTHER2ギーグの逆襲, Mazā Tsū Gīgu no Gyakushū; lit. "Mother 2: Gyiyg Strikes Back"), is a role-playing video game published by Nintendo for the Super NES video game console in 1994. Keiichi Suzuki and Hirokazu Tanaka reprised their roles from Mother as composers for the game, and were joined by assistant composers Hiroshi Kanazu and Toshiyuki Ueno. In an interview with Weekly Famitsu, Keiichi Suzuki commented on how the SNES gave the composers much more freedom to compose what they wanted than the NES, which made development of the music for EarthBound much easier than for its predecessor. This freedom was partially a result of the larger memory space available, because one of the many problems the composers had in the first game was trying to get all of their music on to the cartridge. Another advantage was that the SNES could support playing eight notes at the same time, which when combined with the increased sound quality meant that he could compose music for the game in a similar fashion to how he would compose music for real life. Suzuki cited John Lennon as an influential figure to all the composers while the soundtrack was being developed, as his songs about love matched up with the feeling of the game. Critics and players have noted similarities between parts of some songs in the game to popular songs, including several suspected homages to songs by Lennon and the Beatles. Legal issues surrounding these similarities were suspected to prevent the game from being released on the Virtual Console outside of Japan, but these rumors would end up being dismissed by Bill Trinen, Director of Product Marketing for Nintendo of America.

In a Famitsu interview, Shigesato Itoi said that the amount of music that they fit into eight megabits of space, one-third of the total size of the game, would be enough to fill two Compact Discs if released as a full album. He ascribed the amount of music to the "disorderly", or broad, number of styles of music that were included by Tanaka and Suzuki. He also noted his belief that EarthBound was the first video game to include vibrato, or "string-bending", in its music, and described one of the differences between the music of EarthBound and Mother as that this game had more "jazzy" pieces. Suzuki has estimated that he composed over 100 pieces of music for EarthBound, including pieces that did not make it into the game, and says that his favorite was the music played when the player rode a bicycle in the game, which he had actually composed before starting work on the game. The "OK desu ka?" that plays after the player chooses the character's name was recorded without Itoi's knowledge by Hirokazu Tanaka, and also appeared in Mother 3.

The soundtrack album for EarthBound was released by Sony Records in Japan on November 2, 1994. It was re-released a decade later on February 18, 2004, by Sony Music Direct. The album has 24 tracks, where many of these tracks are arrangements combining several pieces from the game into one piece. The final three tracks on the album consist of remixes of multiple tracks merged; for example, "Room Number (PSI MIX)" is a remixed version of several pieces of music played in different shops and hotels in the game combined into one song. The album was released again in 2016 by Ship to Shore as a set of two vinyl LP records; originally released in four character-themed color options, there exist eight different colorways as of 2018. The album, named Mother 2, uses the same tracks and artwork as the original soundtrack release.

Vincent Chorley, in his review of the album for RPGFan, praised the original game music, applauding it for "conveying emotion and atmosphere, and then playing around with this mental image". As for the album itself, however, he was disappointed in the way that it merged tracks together and kept tracks based on a single song short, saying that "many of the tracks are so short that they are impossible to enjoy in their entirety". The vinyl release was praised by Jeremy Parish of USGamer for its sound quality and the soundtrack's "towering achievement in game music", but he felt that the music was not very "listenable" on its own, and that the album did not fit the LP format as well as an album originally produced for the format would have.

Track list
No.	Title	Music	Japanese title	Length
1.	"Prologue" (from "Strike Back", "This Is No Time to Be Sleeping")	Hirokazu Tanaka	プロローグ	1:05
2.	"Theme of Onett" (from "Let the Adventure Begin")	Keiichi Suzuki	オネットのテーマ	1:20
3.	"Theme of Twoson" (from "Boy Meets Girl")	Suzuki	ツーソンのテーマ	1:22
4.	"Theme of Saturn Valley" (from "Kon'nichiwa")	Suzuki	サターンバレーのテーマ	0:49
5.	"Theme of Winters" (from "Snowman", "Winters White", "The Wind Blows", "Tassy!")	Suzuki, Tanaka	ウィンターズのテーマ	3:46
6.	"Theme of Threed" (from "One Day For Sure")	Suzuki	スリークのテーマ	1:33
7.	"Theme of Doko Doko Desert" (from "Super Dry Dance")	Tanaka	ドコドコ砂漠のテーマ	0:53
8.	"Theme of Fourside" (from "Held in a Skyscraper")	Suzuki	フォーサイドのテーマ	1:47
9.	"Theme of Moonside" (from "Boris' Cocktail", "Moonside Swing")	Tanaka	ムーンサイドのテーマ	0:57
10.	"Theme of Ramma" (from "The Far East", "The Traveller Can Hear the Song", "The Discipline of Mu")	Suzuki, Tanaka	ランマのテーマ	1:57
11.	"Theme of Summers" (from "Private Breeze")	Hiroshi Kanazu	サマーズのテーマ	1:02
12.	"Theme of Scarabi" (from "Bazaar", "Carabiner Ska (Scorpion's Poison)", "Pyramid")	Suzuki, Tanaka, Kanazu	スカラビのテーマ	3:05
13.	"Theme of the Dungeon Man" (from "Megaton Walk", "Enjoy the Dungeon", "Yellow Submarine")	Tanaka	ダンジョン男のテーマ	1:15
14.	"Theme of the Cursed Jungle" (from "The Jungle Opens Its Eyes")	Suzuki	魔境のテーマ	1:38
15.	"Theme of the Gumi Village" (from "Listen, You", "Falling Down Falling Down")	Suzuki, Tanaka	グミの村のテーマ	0:58
16.	"Theme of the Underworld" (from "Earth's Love Song")	Suzuki	地底大陸のテーマ	1:35
17.	"Theme of Magicant" (from "Eight Melodies (From the Bottom of the Memories)", "Welcome Self", "Labyrinth of a Dream", "Sea of Eden", "Power")	Tanaka	マジカントのテーマ	4:43
18.	"Theme of the Great Underworld" (from "Crossing Space and Time", "Becoming Robots", "Space Tunnel", "The Place")	Tanaka	最低国のテーマ	1:31
19.	"Theme of the Final Battle" (from "Disappear!")	Tanaka	最終戦闘のテーマ	4:06
20.	"Theme of Love & Peace" (from "Because I Love You")	Suzuki	平和のテーマ	2:07
21.	"Ending Theme" (from "Good Friends/Bad Friends", "Smiles and Tears")	Suzuki, Tanaka	エンディングのテーマ	9:31
22.	"Room Number (PSI Mix)"	Tanaka	ルームナンバー (PSI MIX)	4:00
23.	"Hula-hoop (PSI Mix)"	Tanaka	フラフープ (PSI MIX)	3:35
24.	"Another 2 (PSI Mix) ~ And Goes On"	Tanaka	ANOTHER 2 (PSI MIX) ~and goes on	5:14

== Mother 1+2 ==
Mother 1+2
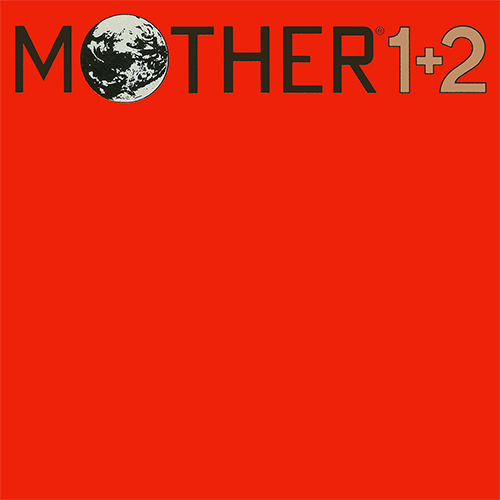

Soundtrack album by Kimitaka Matsumae, Kenji Kondo, and Tomoko Kataoka
- Released: August 20, 2003
- Genre: Video game music
- Length: 1:01:28
- Label: Toshiba-EMI

Mother 1+2 midi Piano Version

Soundtrack album by Shunsuke Sakamoto
- Released: May 27, 2006
- Genre: Video game music
- Length: 55:38
- Label: Sky Port Publishing

The video game Mother 1+2 (MOTHER 1+2, Mazā Wan Tsū) is a port release of Mother and EarthBound (Mother 2) by Nintendo for the Game Boy Advance, released in 2003. Despite its title, the eponymous album is an arranged album. It was released by Toshiba-EMI on August 20, 2003. The first ten tracks from the album are from Mother, while the last 16 are from EarthBound. Unlike the original soundtrack albums, the Mother tracks on this album did not include any vocal arrangements and the EarthBound tracks were not composed of tracks merged. Another album for the collection, Mother 1+2 midi Piano Version, was released three years later on May 27, 2006, by Sky Port Publishing. The album contains MIDI piano arrangements by Shunsuke Sakamoto of songs from the two games with its music covering many different moods, from "lively to sedated". Like the soundtrack album, Mother 1+2 midi Piano Version had its first ten tracks taken from Mother and the other 16 from EarthBound, but with several different tracks than the first album.

Kyle Miller of RPGFan, in his review of the Mother 1+2 album, called it "a quality collection of uplifting, passionate songs". He preferred the Mother tracks to the EarthBound ones, as he felt that the second half of the album contained more "gimmick" tracks, but still called both halves "unique, fun, and well done overall". In his review of the Mother 1+2 midi Piano Version album, he concluded that while "fans of midi piano music" would enjoy the album, the soundtrack album was the superior of the two. His criticism was mainly based on the fact that, while the tracks were "well orchestrated pieces", "played masterfully", and retained the "quality of the compositions" of the originals, the "wacky instrumentation" of the original pieces did not translate to piano arrangements, causing the tunes to "lose some of the spirit that they are known for".

Mother 1+2 track list
No.	Title	Music	Length
1.	"Mother Earth"	Hirokazu Tanaka	1:48
2.	"Pollyanna (I Believe in You)"	Keiichi Suzuki	1:58
3.	"Bein' Friends"	Keiichi Suzuki	1:49
4.	"Humoresque of a Little Dog"	Hirokazu Tanaka	2:09
5.	"Eight Melodies (Toy Piano Version)"	Keiichi Suzuki, Hirokazu Tanaka	1:35
6.	"Wisdom of The World"	Keiichi Suzuki	1:52
7.	"Twinkle Elementary School"	Hirokazu Tanaka	2:14
8.	"Snowman"	Hirokazu Tanaka	2:06
9.	"The Paradise Line"	Keiichi Suzuki	2:29
10.	"Eight Melodies"	Keiichi Suzuki, Tanaka	3:31
11.	"Onett's Theme"	Keiichi Suzuki	2:16
12.	"Twoson's Theme"	Keiichi Suzuki	2:30
13.	"Threed's Theme"	Keiichi Suzuki	2:13
14.	"Saturn Valley's Theme"	Keiichi Suzuki	1:30
15.	"Bicycle's Theme (Kurukuru Pedal)"	Keiichi Suzuki	1:36
16.	"Winter's Theme"	Keiichi Suzuki	3:05
17.	"Hospital Dub (Call the Doctor)"	Keiichi Suzuki	2:15
18.	"Lucky Nice Blues"	Hirokazu Tanaka	2:14
19.	"Fourside (Held in the Skyscraper)"	Keiichi Suzuki	2:22
20.	"Hotel (Pearl Necklace)"	Hirokazu Tanaka	1:09
21.	"Summer's Theme"	Hiroshi Kanazu	1:55
22.	"Ramma's Theme"	Keiichi Suzuki	2:29
23.	"Eight Melodies"	Keiichi Suzuki, Hirokazu Tanaka	1:30
24.	"Light of Life"	Hirokazu Tanaka	2:09
25.	"Because I Love You"	Keiichi Suzuki	3:31
26.	"Smiles and Tears"	Keiichi Suzuki, Hirokazu Tanaka	7:21

Mother 1+2 midi Piano track list
No.	Title	Music	Length
1.	"Pollyanna (I Believe In You)"	Keiichi Suzuki	0:57
2.	"Bein' Friends"	Suzuki	0:49
3.	"The Paradise Line"	Suzuki	0:55
4.	"Magicant"	Tanaka	1:14
5.	"Snow Man"	Suzuki, Tanaka	0:56
6.	"All That I Needed (Was You)"	Suzuki	1:31
7.	"Wisdom of the World"	Suzuki	0:46
8.	"Fallin' Love, And"	Tanaka	0:52
9.	"Eight Melodies"	Suzuki, Tanaka	3:27
10.	"The World of Mother"	Suzuki, Tanaka	9:40
11.	"Onett's Theme"	Suzuki	1:20
12.	"Twoson's Theme"	Suzuki	1:19
13.	"Saturn Valley's Theme"	Suzuki	0:49
14.	"Winter's Theme"	Suzuki	3:45
15.	"Threek's Theme"	Suzuki	1:37
16.	"Dusty Dunes Desert's Theme"	Tanaka	0:50
17.	"Fourside's Theme"	Suzuki	2:02
18.	"Summer's Theme"	Hiroshi Kanazu	1:13
19.	"Scarabi's Theme"	Suzuki, Tanaka	2:43
20.	"Dalaam's Theme"	Suzuki	1:07
21.	"Deep Darkness' Theme"	Suzuki, Tanaka	1:26
22.	"Lost Underworld's Theme"	Suzuki, Tanaka	1:40
23.	"Magicant's Theme"	Tanaka	1:32
24.	"Love & Peace"	Suzuki	2:01
25.	"Ending Theme"	Suzuki, Tanaka	8:49
26.	"Room Number"	Tanaka	2:16

== Mother 3 ==
Mother3+

Soundtrack album by Shogo Sakai
- Released: November 2, 2006; February 2, 2007 (iTunes version)
- Genre: Video game music
- Length: 28:48
- Label: Tokyo Itoi Shigesato Office

Mother3i

Soundtrack album by Shogo Sakai
- Released: February 6, 2007
- Genre: Video game music
- Length: 1:05:55
- Label: Tokyo Itoi Shigesato Office

Love Theme
A 10 second sample of the game's theme, highlighting the song's simplicity.

Mother 3 is a role-playing video game published by Nintendo for the Game Boy Advance handheld game console in 2006. The music for the game was composed exclusively by Shogo Sakai, who had previously composed music for games such as Super Smash Bros. Melee and Kirby Air Ride. Series developer Shigesato Itoi stated that Sakai was given the position because he understood Mother 3 the most, given that he could not use Keiichi Suzuki or Hirokazu Tanaka, the composers for the first two games, as they were both busy with other projects. Itoi also said that given the massive number of songs in the game, over 250, he needed someone who had a lot of time to dedicate to the project and who could focus exclusively on it.

"Love Theme", the main theme of Mother 3, was composed late in the game's development; earlier in development Itoi intended to use the "Pigmask Army" theme as the main theme of the game. During creation of an important scene in the game, however, Sakai was asked to create a song that would have a greater impact than the Pigmask theme; upon its creation it was chosen to be used as the main theme instead of the "Pigmask Army" song. Itoi claims that, given how quickly Sakai composed the song, that he had been "waiting for the order" to make a song like "Love Theme". Itoi requested that "Love Theme" be playable on a piano with only one finger, as the "Eight Melodies" theme from Mother had gained popularity and been played in elementary schools due to its simplicity.

The MOTHER3+ soundtrack album was first released by Tokyo Itoi Shigesato Office on November 2, 2006, and then distributed through the iTunes Store on February 2, 2007. It features an additional bonus track, "MOTHER3 – theme of LOVE". Another album of music from the game, MOTHER3i, was released on February 6, 2007, by Tokyo Itoi Shigesato Office in the iTunes Store and other online music services. Like the EarthBound soundtrack album each track of Mother3i is a combination of several tracks from the game itself, though it still does not cover all of the tracks from the game.

Kyle Miller of RPGFan gave a warm reception to Mother3+ in his review, saying that it "retains the same quirky, but thoughtful feel so well captured by the previous entries in the series" and was "a worthy addition to the Mother musical canon". He enjoyed that it included both songs that were new to Mother 3 and pieces originally from previous entries in the series. He felt that the weakest tracks on the album were those that used real-life instruments, while he named "Snowman" as the strongest. Square Enix Music Online was not as pleased with the album; although the reviewer agreed with Miller on which tracks were the best and worst, they were very critical of the fact that the album contained "only nine or ten distinct themes from a pool of perhaps one hundred viable choices". They also disliked the fact that the pieces were "by design short and repetitive". They instead recommended the Mother3i album, which, though "missing the iconic 'Love' theme and perennial series favorites like 'Pollyanna'", had "more engaging arrangements, less cloying sentimentality, and a wider variety of themes". They also noted the improved sound quality of the album over the original Game Boy Advance version. Mother3+ reached position #24 on the Japanese Oricon charts, and stayed on the charts for three weeks.

Mother 3+ track list
No.	Title	Japanese title	Length
1.	"We miss you ~Love Theme~"	We miss you 〜愛のテーマ〜 (We miss you 〜Ai no Tēma〜)	3:39
2.	"Theme of D.C.M.C."	D.C.M.C.のテーマ (D.C.M.C. no Tēma)	2:26
3.	"Samba de Combo"	サンバ・デ・カンボ (Sanba de Kanbo)	2:37
4.	"Bon Voyage, Amigo"	ボンボヤージュ・アミーゴ (Bonboyāju Amīgo)	2:08
5.	"Big Shot's Theme"	おえらいさんのテーマ (Oeraisan no Tēma)	3:15
6.	"Time Passage"	タイム・パッセージ (Taimu Passēji)	1:55
7.	"A Certain Someone's Memories (Pollyanna)"	だれかさんのおもいで（Pollyanna）(Darekasan no Omoide (Pollyanna))	2:58
8.	"Snowman"	スノーマン (Sunōman)	3:13
9.	"16 Melodies (Beginning)"	16メロディーズ（はじまり）(Jūroku Merodīzu (Hajimari))	2:58
10.	"We miss you ~Love Theme~ (Inst.)"	We miss you 〜愛のテーマ〜（Inst.）(We miss you 〜Ai no Tēma〜 (Inst.))	3:39

Mother 3i track list
No.	Title	Japanese title (literal translation)	Length
1.	"Welcome to MOTHER3 World (from "Fun Naming", "Welcome!", "True Welcome!")"	Welcome to Mother3 World	3:48
2.	"Tazmily is the Stage (from "LOG-O-TYPE", "Something Strange is Going On", "Run, My Dog, Run!")"	舞台はタツマイリ Butai wa Tatsumairi	2:44
3.	"Twist And Battle (from "Mr. Batty Twist", "Rock and Roll (Mild)", "Mischievous Blues")"	Twist And Battle	4:33
4.	"Gentle Rain (from "Confusion", "Somewhere, Someday", "Gentle Rain")"	どうすることも Dō Suru Koto Mo ("What Should I Do?")	4:59
5.	"Mambo and Battle (from "Mambo de Battle", "And El Mariachi")"	哀愁のマンボ Aishū no Manbo ("Grievous Mambo")	3:40
6.	"Theme of Duster (from "Sorrowful Tazmily", "Morning Already", "Mind of a Thief")"	ダスターのテーマ Dasutā no tēma	3:22
7.	"The Castle of Osohe (from "Ragtime Osohe", "Osohe Castle", "Etude for Ghosts")"	オソヘ城にて Osohejō Nite	4:59
8.	"Funky Monkey Dance (from "Chapter 3 ~ Monkey's Love Song", "Open Sesame Oil!", "Open Sesame Tofu!", "Monkey's Delivery Service")"	奇妙なダンス Kimyō na Dansu ("Funky Dance")	4:39
9.	"Oh, Pig Mask (from "Piggy Guys", "Unfounded Revenge")"	嗚呼、ブタマスク Aa, Butamasuku	3:14
10.	"Memory of Tazmily (from "Happy Town?", "And Then There Were None")"	タツマイリの思い出 Tatsumairi no Omoide	4:21
11.	"With Magypsy (from "Pink Shell", "Magypsy's Home, Sweetie-Pie")"	マジプシーと Majipushī To	3:26
12.	"Do Not Disturb (from "Astonishing March", "Wasteful Anthem", "Formidable Foe", "Intense Guys")"	じゃまをしないでくれ Jama o Shinaide Kure	4:47
13.	"Flowers (from "Shower Time Ballad", "Letter from You, My Sweet", "Mother?!")"	Flowers	4:22
14.	"Theme of Bad Boy (from "Porky's Porkies", "Master Porky's Theme", "Battle Memory Medley")"	Bad Boyのテーマ Baddo Bōi no Tēma	7:10
15.	"From Utopia (from "Isn't This Such a Utopia?!", "Suspicious Flying Object", "His Highness' Theme", "Memory of Life")"	行きどまりの街から Ikidomari no Machi Kara	5:51

== Legacy ==
Music from EarthBound was arranged for the piano and published by DOREMI Music Publishing in 1995. The book contains 16 scores, with some covering more than one song from the game. "Onett's Theme" was also included in "Game Music Piano Solo Album", a book published by DOREMI with sheet music from many different games. Sky Port Publishing published a book of piano arrangements in 1996 for the release of Mother 1+2 containing 27 pieces. The "Eight Melodies" song from Mother received some popularity, and was included in some Japanese music textbooks due to its simplicity. A full sheet music book for Mother has never officially been made available, but after its release on the Virtual Console as EarthBound Beginnings, the entire soundtrack was transcribed by a fan into sheet music. Super Smash Bros., a series of fighting games published by Nintendo featuring characters and music from established video games, has included several songs from the Mother series. Super Smash Bros. Melee featured a few songs from the series: "Bein' Friends", "Eight Melodies", "Pollyanna", "Fourside", and "Sound Stone". (Note: A medley of "Bein' Friends" and "Eight Melodies" is titled "Mother" in the game, and "Pollyanna" is titled "Mother 2". "Fourside" is called "EarthBound", and parts of "Sound Stone" are used in "EarthBound" and Ness's victory theme.) Several songs from Mother 3 were included in Super Smash Bros. Brawl, including "Love Theme", "Unfounded Revenge", "Smashing Song of Praise", "You Call This a Utopia?!" and "Porky's Theme". Brawl also included "Humoresque of a Little Dog" and "Snowman" from Mother, and also featured "Mother" and "Mother 2" from Melee. Several tracks from the series did not make it into Super Smash Bros. Brawl but still exist inside the game's code, such as "Because I Love You", "Eight Melodies", "Smiles and Tears", and "Hippie Battle". Super Smash Bros. for Nintendo 3DS and Wii U adds new remixes of "Magicant / Eight Melodies", arranged by Yoko Shimomura, "Smiles and Tears", arranged by Toru Minegishi, and "Onett Theme / Winters Theme", arranged by Asuka Hayazaki. The 2015 video game Undertale, inspired by EarthBound, includes several homages to the game's music in its soundtrack.

"Because I Love You" and "Eagle Land" from EarthBound were played by the Tokyo Memorial Orchestra for the second Orchestral Game Concert on September 15, 1992, as part of a five concert tour, which was later released as a series of albums. "Because I Love You" was again played in their third concert, and was the only song to make an appearance in more than one concert in the tour. A medley of songs from all three games was performed at the "Press Start -Symphony of Games- 2006" concert in Tokyo. Selections of remixes of music from the series also appear on Japanese remix albums, called Dōjin, and on English remixing websites such as OverClocked Remix. A group of remixes of Mother and EarthBound music was released as an unofficial download-only album titled Bound Together by a group of artists from OverClocked Remix and elsewhere on October 29, 2006, containing 48 remixes and almost three hours of music.
