= Marvin, Seth and Stanley =

- Directed by: Stephen Gurewitz
- Written by: Stephen Gurewitz
- Produced by: Britni West
- Starring: Alex Karpovsky; Stephen Gurewitz; Marvin Gurewitz
- Cinematography: Adam Ginsberg
- Edited by: Adam Ginsberg
- Music by: David Mercer; Ira Wertheim
- Release dates: 21 April 2012 (Wisconsin Film Festival); 25 April 2014 (US)
- Running time: 75 minutes
- Country: United States
- Language: English

Marvin, Seth and Stanley is a 2012 American comedy-drama film directed by Stephen Gurewitz, starring Alex Karpovsky, Gurewitz and Gurewitz's father Marvin Gurewitz.

== Cast ==
- Alex Karpovsky as Seth Greenstein
- Stephen Gurewitz as Stanley Greenstein
- Marvin Gurewitz as Marvin Greenstein

== Release ==
The film opened in theatres in Brooklyn on 25 April 2014.

== Reception ==
Richard Brody of The New Yorker called the film the "kind of observational comedy that most observational comedies aren't — because this one is based in actual observation, in an unsparing intimacy regarding the characters, a pitch-perfect ear for the lifetime of emotion packed in an offhanded remark, and a patiently avid camera-eye that follows the characters insistently and pounces on quiet moments of revelation."

Neil Genzlinger of The New York Times wrote that while the characters have a few "nice, even revelatory scenes that combine humor and pain", their "dominant mode of interaction by the movie’s end seems to be silence, just as it was at the beginning, and we never do get to know Marvin or Stanley very well."

Inkoo Kang of The Village Voice wrote that the film's third act "has all the power of a wave, dissolving as quickly as it appears", and that the cinematography "only invites unfavorable comparisons to the more ambitious, psychologically searching interpersonal dramas of that era."
