= Apartment Troubles =

- Directed by: Jess Weixler; Jennifer Prediger
- Written by: Jess Weixler; Jennifer Prediger
- Produced by: Felipe Dieppa; Kim Leadford; Daniel McCarney
- Starring: Jess Weixler; Jennifer Prediger
- Cinematography: Daniel Sharnoff
- Edited by: Arturo Sosa
- Music by: Thomas Bartlett
- Production company: Starstream Media
- Distributed by: Gravitas Ventures
- Release date: June 15, 2014 (Los Angeles)
- Running time: 80 minutes
- Country: United States
- Language: English

Apartment Troubles is a 2014 American comedy-drama film written, directed by, and starring Jess Weixler and Jennifer Prediger. The film marks the screenwriting and directorial debut of both Weixler and Prediger.

== Plot ==
Olivia and Nicole share an apartment in New York City, where they pay an illegal sublease to a landlord with whom they have under-the-table arrangement. When Olivia's cat dies, she and Nicole travel to Hollywood to visit her aunt, Kimberly, who works as a judge at American Idol competitor, That Special Something.

== Cast ==
- Jess Weixler as Nicole
- Jennifer Prediger as Olivia
- Megan Mullally as Aunt Kimberley
- Will Forte as Simon
- Jeffrey Tambor as Bob
- Bob Byington as Uncle Robert

== Reception ==
On review aggregator website Rotten Tomatoes, the film has a rating of 43% based on reviews from 7 critics, with an average rating of 4.3/10. Sandie Angulo Chen of Common Sense Media awarded the film one star out of four. Kate Erbland of The Dissolve awarded it three stars out of five.

Geoff Berkshire of Variety called Apartment Troubles "a slight and only mildly amusing buddy comedy".

Justin Lowe of The Hollywood Reporter, wrote: "Creative miscalculation rarely gets celebrated so enthusiastically".

According to Michael Nordine of IndieWire, the comedy that he saw was "awry".
