= The Good Liars =

American political comedy duo

- Notable work: Undecided: The Movie; The Supporters

Comedy career
- Years active: 2011–present
- Members: Jason Selvig; Davram Stiefler
- Website: www.goodliars.com

The Good Liars is an American political comedy duo consisting of Jason Selvig and Davram Stiefler. They have been active since 2011, with their first stunt happening during Occupy Wall Street. Their primary focus is infiltrating conservative rallies and campaign events to interact with, interview, and troll politicians and their supporters, with many of these interactions going viral on social media.

== Background ==
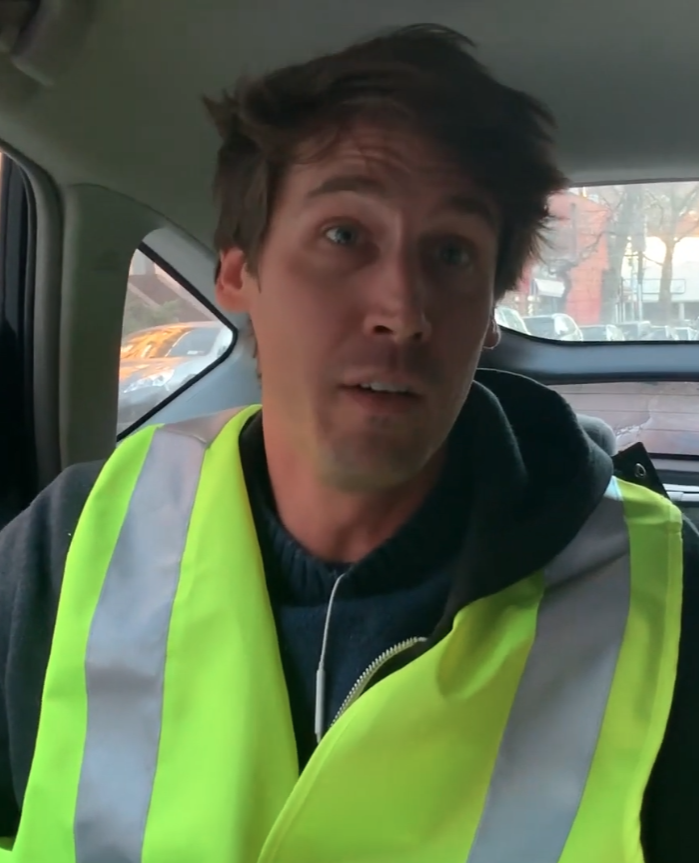
Jason Selvig in 2020

Jason Selvig and Davram Stiefler were both born in the 1980s, with Selvig being born on November 5. They developed a friendship through their shared involvement in the New York City comedy scene as well as through playing basketball together.

Selvig and Stiefler made their debut as the comedy duo The Good Liars during the 2011 Occupy Wall Street movement in which they, while being dressed up as investment bankers, created a satirical "Occupy Occupy Wall Street" movement. This prank initially confused the media, who interviewed the duo and mistakenly believed their satirical claims of being "proud members of the 1%." The act also managed to fool actual investment bankers, who, thinking the duo were serious, joined their counter-protests. As a result, the duo took the opportunity to make statements to poke fun at them, such as, in the words of Selvig, "If we keep doing this, we're gonna have to bump our cocaine addiction and sell our fourth house in the Hamptons."

== Activities ==
The Good Liars have done multiple acts that have gone viral on social media, such as in January 2016 when the duo infiltrated a Trump campaign in Iowa and yelled at Trump, calling him "boring" and saying that they "came here to be entertained", until they were escorted out. On January 13, 2024, another Republican campaign in Iowa was infiltrated, this time by Stiefler, during a Ron DeSantis campaign in Atlantic, Iowa. At the campaign, Stiefler approached DeSantis in front of a crowd and presented him a participation trophy, saying, "Now, probably not gonna win the election, right, but we're proud of you for trying," as well as called DeSantis "our little snowflake." Stiefler was then escorted away by security. The following day, Selvig and Stiefler were seen interrupting another Iowa campaign by Vivek Ramaswamy in Ankeny.

In response to the book bannings occurring in the United States, Selvig and Stiefler made a video tricking Republican supporters into thinking that the bible should be banned in schools by describing to them about the presence of a book in school libraries containing "a story of two daughters having sex with their dad" in which "they get their dad drunk to have sex with him" and letting them react prior to revealing that the book in question is the bible. The specific story mentioned in the video comes from Genesis 19:30–38 in the bible.

In late May 2022, during an annual National Rifle Association of America conference, Selvig delivered a speech to Wayne LaPierre, the head of the organization. During his speech, he mockingly expressed gratitude towards him for the thoughts and prayers he has offered to the victims and families of mass shootings, responding to criticisms that LaPierre has not taken sufficient action to prevent mass shootings. In addition to his speech, Selvig interviewed various attendees of the conference, one of whom was a man wearing a shirt featuring the Confederate flag. Selvig questioned the man about the flag's association with racism and slavery. Upon being asked multiple times about his stance on slavery, the man responded with "no comment" and left the interview.

=== Mock pieces ===
The Good Liars have created multiple mock pieces and advertisements intended to mock politicians, including a 2019 New York City Subway advertisement referring Rudy Giuliani as "Crazy Rudy", changing covers for Donald Trump Jr.'s 2019 book Triggered to "Daddy, Please Love Me", creating a mock "confederate monument" for Steve King, putting up mock missing person posters for Bill de Blasio, and making parody U.S. Army recruitment advertisement posters to mock the Trump family.

=== Productions ===
Selvig and Stiefler, both having separately played minor roles in various films in the past such as The Wolf of Wall Street (Stiefler) or Summer of Blood (Selvig), have starred in productions as a duo, particularly in comedy mockumentary films featuring their real-life interactions with political candidates.

In 2016, the duo starred in Undecided: The Movie, a comedy mockumentary in which two undecided United States voters named John Nelson (played by Selvig) and Dan Stiever (played by Stiefler) search for the candidate that best aligns with their views during the 2016 United States elections. Nelson and Stiever, whose social and political qualities oppose each other, cause disruptions at political rallies featuring candidates such as Ted Cruz, Marco Rubio, Donald Trump, and Hillary Clinton.

On November 4, 2021, MeidasTouch released The Supporters, a mockumentary featuring Selvig and Stiefler as a fictional right-wing podcasting duo consisting of Derek and Dale who strive to be a part of Fox News.
