= Peter and Vandy =

- Theatrical release poster
- Directed by: Jay DiPietro
- Screenplay by: Jay DiPietro
- Based on: Peter and Vandy by Jay DiPietro
- Produced by: Bingo Gubelmann; Benji Kohn; Austin Stark; Peter Sterling
- Starring: Jason Ritter; Jess Weixler
- Cinematography: Frank G. DeMarco
- Edited by: Geoffrey Richman
- Music by: Jason Lifton
- Production companies: Cook Street Productions; Paper Street Films
- Distributed by: Strand Releasing
- Release date: January 19, 2009 (Sundance Film Festival)
- Running time: 80 minutes
- Country: United States
- Language: English

Peter and Vandy is a 2009 American romantic independent drama film starring Jason Ritter and Jess Weixler. The film was written and directed by Jay DiPietro, adapted from his own play of the same name which opened in 2002 in New York.

== Plot ==
Peter and Vandy is a love story told out of order. Set in Manhattan, the story shifts back and forth in time, juxtaposing Peter and Vandy's romantic beginnings with the twisted, manipulative, regular couple they become.

== Cast ==
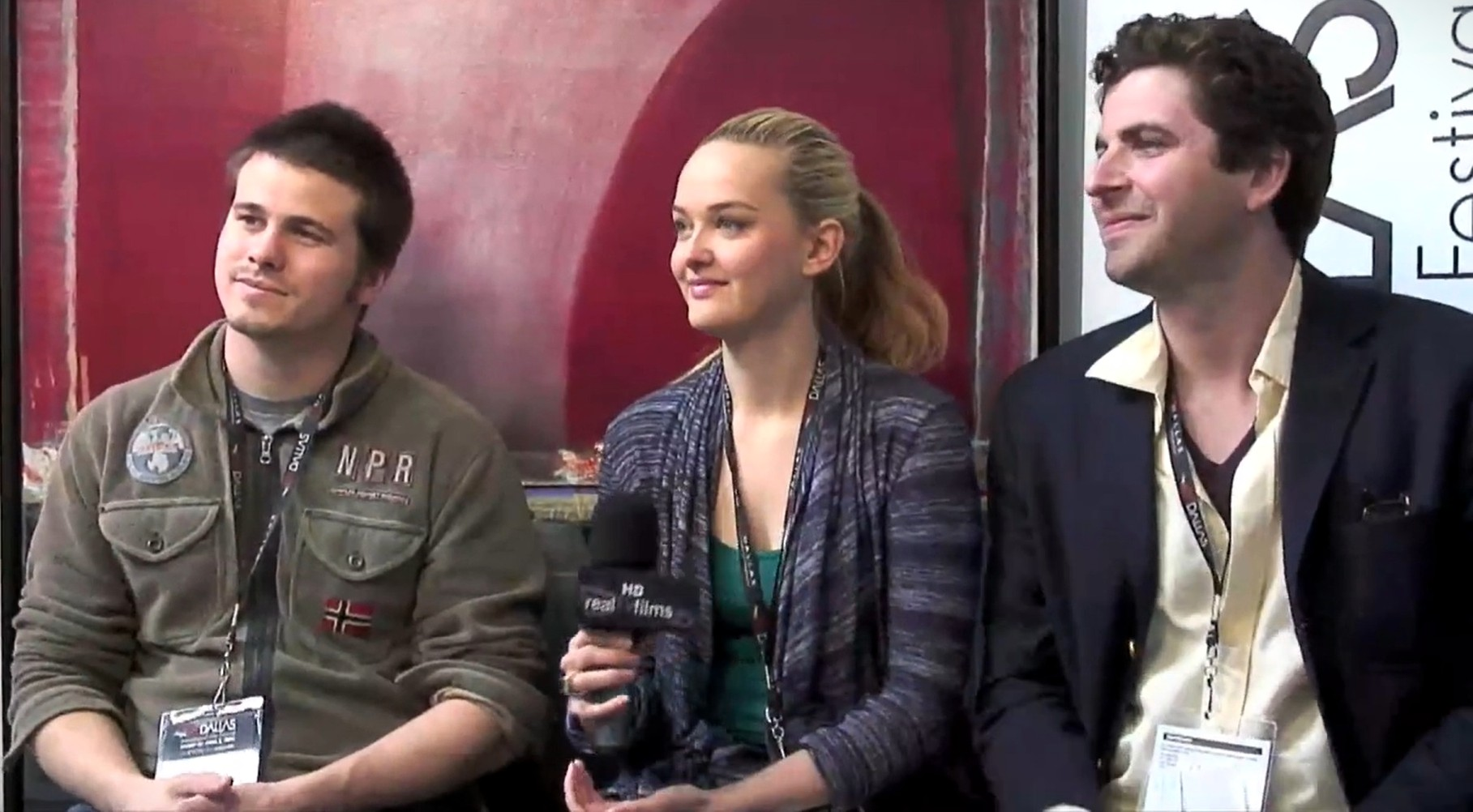
Left to right: Actors Jason Ritter, Jess Weixler, and writer and director Jay DiPietro discuss their film Peter and Vandy in 2009

- Jason Ritter as Peter
- Jess Weixler as Vandy
- Jesse L. Martin as Paul
- Tracie Thoms as Marissa
- Noah Bean as Andrew
- Bruce Altman as Dad
- Dana Eskelson as Emma
- Kristina Klebe as Michelle
- Zak Orth as Keith
- David Rasche as Alan
- Maryann Plunkett as Mom

== Release ==
The film selected and premiered at the Sundance Film Festival on January 19, 2009. It opened on a limited release basis in the United States in October of the same year. It has been screened at various film festivals, including: the São Paulo International Film Festival, the Gen Art Film Festival, the AFI Dallas Film Festival, the Waterfront Film Festival, the Provincetown International Film Festival and the Tallgrass Film Festival.

A DVD of the film was released on February 9, 2010, in Region 1.

== Reception ==
=== Critical response ===
Peter Vandy drew mixed reviews from critics. As of June 2020, the film holds a 65% approval rating on review aggregator Rotten Tomatoes, based on 20 reviews with an average rating of 5.55/10. The New York Times film critic Jeannette Catsoulis gave the film a mixed review, praising the film's acting, photography, and soundtrack but saying "nonlinear structure...and unrevealing dialogue too often hold us at arm's length, a puzzle to be solved without sufficient clues....Peter and Vandy is more a designer frame for actors than nourishing entertainment." By contrast, film critics Frederic and Mary Ann Brussat of the web-based Spirituality & Practice, praised the nonlinear structure, saying "the filmmaker challenges us to understand and appreciate that intimate relationships stand or fall on the basis of how couples handle trifles and everyday routines. Metromix film critic Geoff Berkshire also liked the film, saying it offers "a refreshingly clear-eyed look at relationships," comparing it to Eternal Sunshine of the Spotless Mind. "The non-linear approach relies on both subtle and obvious visual clues to keep the audience properly oriented, and enhances the narrative...DiPietro's dialogue is sharp and Ritter and Weixler credibly flesh out characters who aren't always likeable, they're just two regular people trying their best at love." Meanwhile, panning the film in Variety, critic Todd McCarthy felt "Some of the linear deck-shuffling creates small frissons, but there's no underlying tension or subtext to shore up the banal talk."

=== Awards ===
Nominated

- Sundance Film Festival: Grand Jury Prize, Dramatic, Jay DiPietro; 2009.

== Soundtrack ==
=== Track listing ===
- "Abel" by The National
- "Wet and Rusting" by Menomena
- "Brace Yourself" by Les Savy Fav
- "Air Better Come" by The Shaky Hands
- "Enticing Luxuries" by Chris DiPetrio
- "Overture" by Patrick Wolf
- "Good Arms vs. Bad Arms" by Frightened Rabbit
- "Fireworks" by Animal Collective
- "For Money or Love" by The Like Young
- "The Same Old Song" by 33 To Nothing
- "Gospel" by The National
