= See You Next Tuesday (film) =

- Directed by: Drew Tobia
- Written by: Drew Tobia
- Produced by: Rachel Wolther
- Starring: Eleanore Pienta, Dana Eskelson, Molly Plunk
- Cinematography: Andrew J. Whittaker
- Edited by: Sofi Marshall
- Music by: Brian McOmber
- Release date: October 13, 2013 (London Film Festival)
- Running time: 82 minutes
- Country: United States
- Language: English

See You Next Tuesday is a 2013 independent drama film directed by Drew Tobia and his first full length feature film. The film had its world premiere on October 13, 2013 at the London Film Festival and Eleanore Pienta as a pregnant woman that has a complicated personal relationship with her family.

Tobia initially came up with the concept for the film after viewing one of Eleanore Pienta's photography projects, which featured a pregnant woman that had a phobia of her fetus contracting an infection by flies. From there Tobia wrote the film's script and added additional characters to round out the cast. Filming took place in Brooklyn in Greenpoint, Sunset Park, and Bushwick.

== Synopsis ==
Mona (Eleanore Pienta) is an unpleasant pregnant woman that ends up getting fired from her job as a checkout clerk at a grocery store in Brooklyn. She's later kicked out of her mother May's (Dana Eskelson) apartment, which forces her to move in with her lesbian sister Jordan (Molly Plunk) and her girlfriend Sylve (Keisha Zollar). Mona's relationship with Jordan is as toxic as her relationship with her mother, and her presence soon puts an additional strain on Jordan and Sylve's own relationship.

== Cast ==
- Eleanore Pienta as Mona
- Dana Eskelson as May
- Molly Plunk as Jordan
- Keisha Zollar as Sylve
- Taylor Dior as Alicia
- Stephan Goldbach as Dogfood Guy
- Michele Meises as Meeting Leader
- Michele Ann Suttile as AA Member
- Levi Wilson as AA Sex Addict
- Maria Wilson as Naomi
- Sirita Wright as Shondra
- Beverly Bonner

== Reception ==
Critical reception for See You Next Tuesday has been mixed to positive and Tallie Medel (via Paste magazine) considered the film to be one of her favorite movies for 2013. The Tucson Weekly and Toronto Star both praised the film, and the Toronto Star commented that the film was sometimes "abrasive" and that "Flashes of humour and some unexpected moments of poignancy help temper the rough stuff". Critics for IndieWire lauded the film, with one critic citing the movie's birth scene as a highlight while the other remarked that See You Next Tuesday deserved more attention than it got.

The Hollywood Reporter panned See You Next Tuesday overall, as they felt that it was "deeply unpleasant" and that it was "solely for viewers who demand extremes."

=== Awards ===
- Best Movie ifab Brandenburg Gate Award at the International Film Awards Berlin (2014, won)
- Jambor-Franklin Founder's Award for Best Narrative at the Birmingham Sidewalk Moving Picture Festival (2013, won)
- Audience Choice Award for Best Feature Film at the Chicago Underground Film Festival (2013, won)
- Duncan-Williams Scriptwriting Award at the Indie Memphis Film Festival (2013, won)
- Special Jury Award for outstanding performance at the Indie Memphis Film Festival (2013, won - Eleanor Pienta)
- Most Effectively Offensive at the Boston Underground Film Festival (2013, won)
