= Brock Enright =

American artist (born 1976)

Brock Enright (born 1976), is an artist, who was raised in Virginia Beach, Virginia.

== Academic Background ==
He received his BFA from the Maryland Institute College of Art, and his MFA from Columbia University. In his 2001 MFA thesis presentation, his mother performed a body building routine. Known as a master draftsman with a strong rebellious streak, Enright often eschews formal beauty in favor of degraded or complicated aesthetics. He has had solo exhibitions at Nicelle Beauchene Gallery (New York), Vilma Gold (London), Coma (Berlin), and at the institution LAXART. His work has been written about in Parkett, The New York Times, Art Review, and the Times, UK. Enright's artwork has also been seen in notable group exhibitions including Scream (Anton Kern Gallery, 2004), Greater New York (PS1, 2005), The Aesthetics of Risk (The Getty Center, 2006), and 2007's Performa festival of performing arts.

Artwork by Brock Enright often imbues traditional materials or images with modern, unsettling qualities or elements. His influences can range from video game violence to horror films to 16th century allegorical paintings. Among the various artists in his peer group who have addressed teenage rebellion, violence and culture through artwork, including Sue de Beer, Banks Violette, and Olaf Breuning, Enright has perhaps received the most attention from the mainstream media. This is in part due to the "designer kidnapping" service called VIDEOGAMES Adventure Services he created in 2002. This official business staged false abductions for paying clients. Enright also directed a stage version of the film Debbie Does Dallas in 2001. In 2005 he worked with Ivan Hürzeler to produce the film Forest.

Enright and his wife, artist Kirsten Deirup, are the subjects of the award-winning 2009 feature-length documentary Brock Enright: Good Times Will Never Be The Same, a verite film which documents the creation of Brock's solo show at Perry Rubenstein Gallery in 2007.
