= Rio Breaks =

2009 film directed by Justin Mitchell

- Directed by: Justin Mitchell
- Written by: Vince Medeiros; Justin Mitchell
- Produced by: Francesco Civita; Herbert Gauss; Sheri Levine; Vince Medeiros; Justin Mitchell; Michael Thornton
- Production companies: The Breadcrumb Trail; Forward Entertainment; Prodigo Films; Sundance Channel
- Distributed by: Mr Bongo Films; Sundance Channel
- Release date: September 21, 2009 (Festival do Rio)
- Running time: 85 minutes
- Country: United States
- Language: Portuguese

Rio Breaks is a 2009 American documentary film directed by Justin Mitchell, that explores surfing and slum-life in Rio de Janeiro through chronicling the trials and tribulations of two teenage surfers, Fabio and Naama, as they pursue the sport while also being tempted into the drug gang life of the favelas.
