= Applesauce (film) =

- Directed by: Onur Tukel
- Written by: Onur Tukel
- Produced by: Matt Grady; Melodie Sisk; Karl Jacob; Greg Newman
- Starring: Max Casella; Trieste Kelly Dunn; Jennifer Prediger; Onur Tukel; Dylan Baker
- Cinematography: Jason Banker
- Edited by: Justin Kavoussi; Onur Tukel
- Music by: Michael Montes
- Distributed by: MPI Media Group
- Release date: April 19, 2015 (Tribeca Film Festival)
- Running time: 91 minutes
- Country: United States
- Language: English

Applesauce is a 2015 black comedy film written and directed by Onur Tukel. The film stars Tukel, Max Casella, Trieste Kelly Dunn, Jennifer Prediger, and Dylan Baker.

== Cast ==
- Max Casella as Les
- Trieste Kelly Dunn as Nicki
- Jennifer Prediger as Kate
- Onur Tukel as Ron
- Dylan Baker as Stevie Bricks
- Karl Jacob as Wally
- Kevin Scanlon as Officer Prince
- Ariel Kavoussi as Officer Potts
- Kimber Monroe as Cameron
- Jahmani Perry as Principal Clark
- Lisa Tharps as Rain's Mother
- Bill Weeden as Kate's Father

== Release ==
Applesauce premiered at the Tribeca Film Festival on April 19, 2015. The film was distributed by MPI Media Group and was released on VOD and DVD on November 24, 2015.

== Reception ==
=== Critical response ===
Applesauce received a positive response from critics. The film holds a 71% positive "Fresh" rating on the review aggregator Rotten Tomatoes. Ronnie Scheib of Variety praised Applesauce as "Onur Tukel's latest and most accomplished microbudget exercise in cynical absurdism" and added, "With its sarcastic dialogue, deadpan humor, believably flawed characters and surreal logic, 'Applesauce' may expand Tukel's growing indie fan base into niche release." Eric Kohn of Indiewire gave the film a modest "B" rating, calling it a "spot-on urban satire." He further wrote:

The movie's third act melts into a series of random twists involving death, multiple acts of vengeance and other peculiar developments, some of which are left unresolved. Even then, however, the wacky, unruly plot has a consistent through line: Tukel invests most of his narrative making terrible people objects of ridicule, with a final punchline suggesting that, in the game of life, everyone's stuck on one side or the other of the same bad joke.

Conversely, Justin Lowe of The Hollywood Reporter criticized the script for possessing "an unfavorable view of human nature that it’s difficult to identify any likeable characters, most of whom are constantly scheming to manipulate and discredit one another." He added:

As the principal instigator, Tukel bestows Ron with an outsize share of unpleasant qualities that are elaborated with a tiresomely repetitive performance that draws the supporting cast into a diminishing spiral of criticism and retribution. Their sometimes vague motivations and a series of implausible plot developments are further off-putting factors periodically derailing the narrative, which consistently struggles to connect, despite the film’s passable indie-production aesthetic.
