= Alex Karpovsky =

American actor and film director

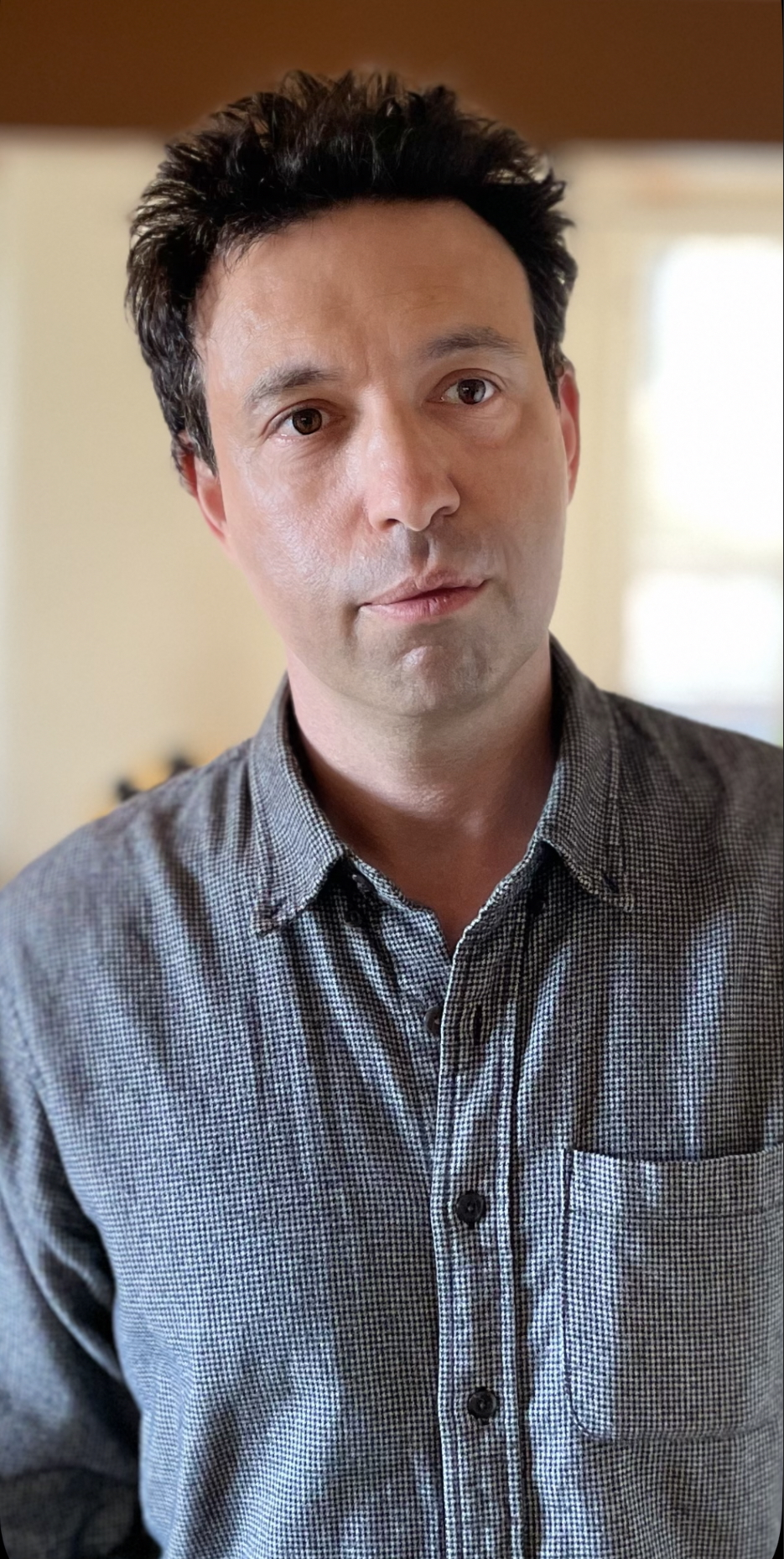
- Born: Alexander Karpovsky; September 23, 1975 (age 51); Newton, Massachusetts, United States
- Education: Boston University; (BA); University of Oxford
- Occupations: Actor; director; screenwriter; producer; film editor
- Years active: 2003–present

Alexander Karpovsky (born September 23, 1975) is an American actor, director, screenwriter, producer, and film editor. He is best known for his role as Raymond "Ray" Ploshansky on the HBO comedy drama series Girls (2012–2017), for which he was nominated for the Critics' Choice Television Award for Best Supporting Actor in a Comedy Series. He is also known for his roles as Craig on the Amazon Prime Video psychological thriller series Homecoming (2018–20) and Jeff Glaser on the Peacock drama miniseries Angelyne (2022).

== Early life and education ==
Alex Karpovsky was raised in Newton, Massachusetts. He earned a bachelor's degree from Boston University before receiving a master's degree in visual ethnography at the University of Oxford.

== Career ==
His debut feature, The Hole Story, earned him a slot in Filmmaker magazine's 25 new faces of independent film. His subsequent feature-length films include Woodpecker, Trust Us, This Is All Made Up, Rubberneck, and Red Flag, the latter two of which were released as a double feature at New York City's Film at Lincoln Center. In addition to these features, Karpovsky has directed numerous episodes of TV shows as well as commercials and music videos.

As an actor, he played Ray Ploshansky in the HBO comedy series Girls, and also appeared in the Coen Brothers' films Inside Llewyn Davis and Hail, Caesar!, was a series regular on Amazon's Homecoming, played Dr. Seiderman on Curb Your Enthusiasm, and had a leading role in the Peacock limited series, Angelyne.

As a writer and producer, he has developed projects at Amazon, Comedy Central, FX, TBS, and Hulu.

As a voice performer, Karpovsky's work has appeared in Selected Shorts, The Paris Review, Modern Love, n+1, Grand Theft Auto IV, and This American Life.

Karpovsky also collaborates with graphic designer Teddy Blanks. Together they work as Spielbergs, and created, wrote and directed the 2019 miniseries Oh Jerome, No, starring Mamoudou Athie.

== Filmography ==
=== Actor ===
Year	Title	Role	Notes
2003	Cry Funny Happy	Henry	
2005	The Hole Story	Alex	
2008	Cubby Knowles	Robert Lincoln	
2009	Beeswax	Merrill Graf	
2009	Harmony and Me	Mean Man Mike	
2010	Bass Ackwards	Vlad	
2010	Lovers of Hate	Paul Lucas	
2010	Tiny Furniture	Jed	
2010	Incredibly Small	Tom	
2011	Codependent Lesbian Space Alien Seeks Same	Rookie Agent	
2011	Wuss	Wally Combs	
2011	Almost in Love	Sasha	
2012	Sleepwalk with Me	Ian Gilmore	
2012	Gayby	Peter	
2012	Supporting Characters	Nick Berger	
2012	Rubberneck	Paul Harris	
2012	Marvin, Seth and Stanley	Seth Greenstein	
2012	Red Flag	Alex	
2013	Good Night	Jake	
2013	Inside Llewyn Davis	Marty Green	
2014	The Foxy Merkins	Merkin Man	
2014	Summer of Blood	Jamie	
2015	Tired Moonlight	Mike	
2015	Possibilia	Rick	
2015	Bloomin Mud Shuffle	Chuck	
2015	7 Chinese Brothers	Kaminsky	
2016	Hail, Caesar!	Mr. Smitrovich	
2016	Folk Hero & Funny Guy	Paul Scott	
2016	My Entire High School Sinking Into the Sea	Drake	Voice role
2017	The Vanishing of Sidney Hall	David Bauer	
2017	Fits and Starts	Charles	
2017	Girlfriend's Day	Styvesan	
2018	The Front Runner	Mike Stratton	
2018	Being Frank	Ross	
2019	The Sound of Silence	Landon	
2019	The Return of the Yuletide Kid	Michael	
2020	The Ride	Chris	
2021	Cryptozoo	David	Voice role

=== Television ===
Year	Title	Role	Notes
2012–2015	Law & Order: Special Victims Unit	Stephen Lomatin	2 episodes
2012–2017	Girls	Ray Ploshansky	42 episodes
2014	Dinner with Friends with Brett Gelman and Friends	Himself	Television Special
2015	The Show About The Show	Himself	2 episodes
2016	Deadbeat	Jared the Liar	Episode: "Medieval Dead"
2018	Drunk History	Zvi Aharoni	Episode: "Heists"
2018–2020	Homecoming	Craig Petrosian	13 episodes
2020	Curb Your Enthusiasm	Doctor Seiderman	Episode: "The Spite Store"
2022	Angelyne	Jeff Glaser	5 episodes
2025 -	Nobody Wants This	Big Noah	3 episodes
2027	Recap	Doc Broussard	3 episodes

=== Music video ===
Year	Title	Artist(s)
2017	When You Die	MGMT

=== Video game ===
Year	Title	Role
2008	Grand Theft Auto IV	The Crowd of Liberty City (voice)

=== Writer/director ===
Year	Title	Role	Notes	Network/Festival
2027	Allow Me To Destroy You	Writer/Director	(Upcoming feature-length film)	
2019	Oh Jerome, No	Writer/Director	Episodes 101-108	FXX
2018	Love	Director	Episode 304	Netflix
2016	The New Yorker Presents	Director	Episode 105	Amazon
2016	Girls	Director	Episode 509	HBO
2012	Red Flag	Writer/Director	feature	LA Film Festival
2012	Rubberneck	Writer/Director	feature	Tribeca
2009	Trust Us, This Is All Made Up	Writer/Director	feature	SXSW
2008	Woodpecker	Writer/Director	feature	SXSW
2006	The Hole Story	Writer/Director	feature	Harvard Film Archive
