= Lewis Pullman =

American actor (born 1993)

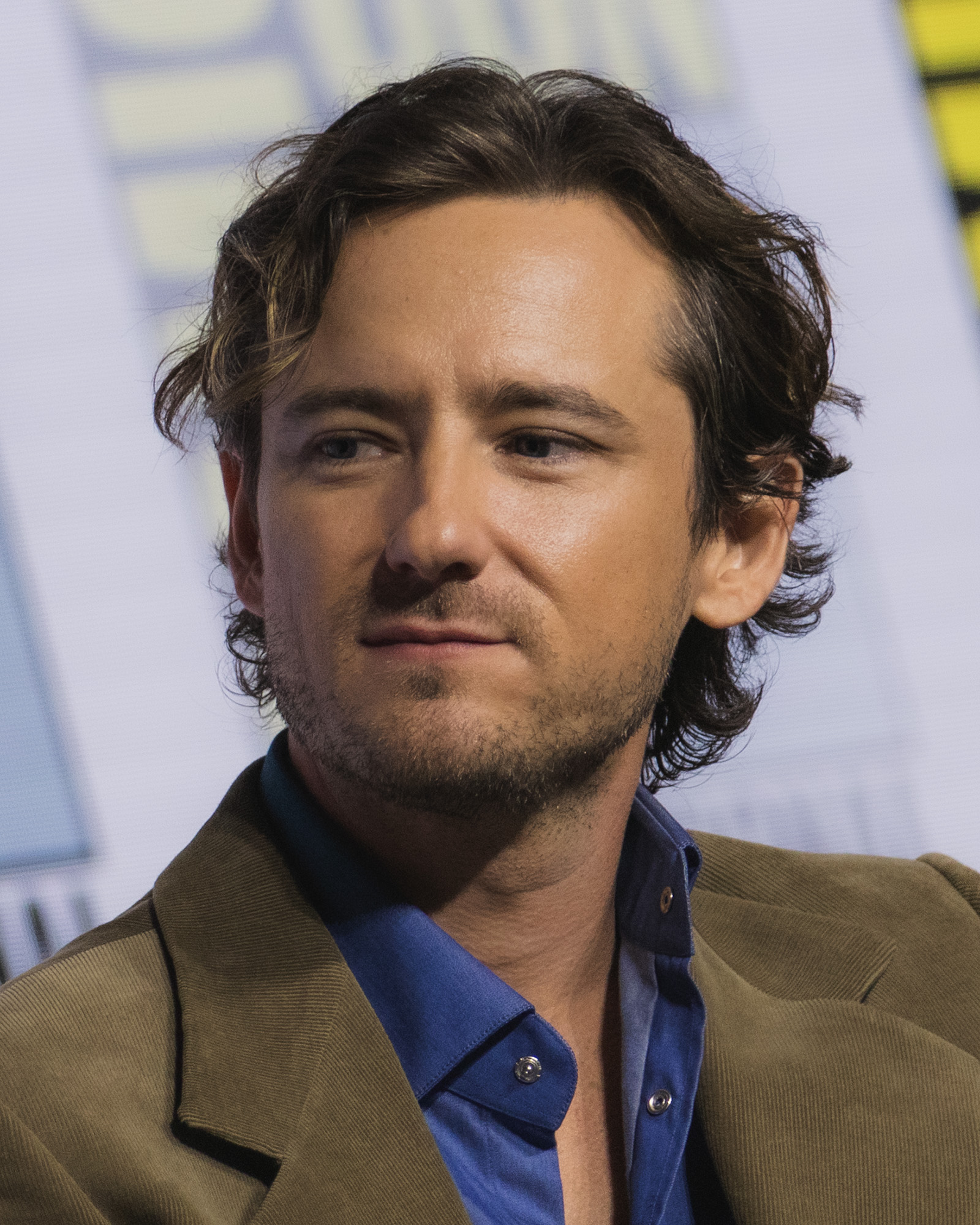
- Pullman in 2026
- Born: Lewis James Pullman; January 29, 1993 (age 33); Los Angeles, California, U.S.
- Education: Warren Wilson College (BA)
- Occupations: Actor; musician
- Years active: 2013–present
- Father: Bill Pullman

Lewis James Pullman (born January 29, 1993) is an American actor and musician. He made his film debut opposite his father, Bill Pullman, in the western film The Ballad of Lefty Brown (2017). For his performance as Miles Miller in the neo-noir thriller film Bad Times at the El Royale (2018), Pullman was nominated for the Saturn Award for Best Supporting Actor. Pullman subsequently had supporting roles in films such as The Strangers: Prey at Night (2018), Them That Follow (2019), Top Gun: Maverick (2022), and Riff Raff (2024), as well as lead roles in Press Play (2022), The Starling Girl (2023), 'Salem's Lot, Skincare (both 2024), The Testament of Ann Lee (2025), and Remarkably Bright Creatures (2026). He gained international recognition and critical praise for his role as Robert "Bob" Reynolds / Sentry in the Marvel Cinematic Universe film Thunderbolts* (2025).

Pullman is also known for his supporting roles as Major Major Major Major on the Hulu satirical black comedy miniseries Catch-22 (2019) and Calvin Evans on the Apple TV period drama miniseries Lessons in Chemistry (2023), the latter of which earned him nominations for the Primetime Emmy Award for Outstanding Supporting Actor in a Limited or Anthology Series or Movie and the Critics' Choice Television Award for Best Supporting Actor in a Movie/Miniseries, and his lead role as Rhett Abbott on the Amazon Prime Video science fiction neo-western series Outer Range (2022–2024).

Outside of acting, he is also a musician and is currently the drummer for the indie pop rock band Atta Boy, which he formed with lead vocalist Eden Brolin in 2012.

== Early life ==
Pullman was born in Los Angeles, California, to actor Bill Pullman and modern dancer Tamara Hurwitz. He has a sister, Maesa, who is a singer-songwriter, and a brother, Jack, who is a puppet-maker. His mother is of Russian Jewish descent. Pullman was diagnosed with OCD at age 12.

Pullman attended Wildwood School in Los Angeles for high school. In 2015, he graduated from Warren Wilson College in Swannanoa, North Carolina, with a bachelor's degree in Social Work. Warren Wilson College has a large working farm on campus, and Pullman said he was "on the tractor division [in college]. I figured if acting didn't work out I could be on the road crew, working the back hoe."

== Career ==
Pullman plays the drums in the band Atta Boy alongside Eden Brolin, Freddy Reish, and Dashel Thompson. They released their first album, Out of Sorts, in 2012 as a "whimsical experiment." Their second album, Big Heart Manners, was released in 2020. The band released a third album, Crab Park, in 2022.

Pullman began his acting career with several short films, starting with The Tutor in 2013. He had to split his time between living in Los Angeles and Montana. After graduating college in 2015, he was asked by filmmakers Jonathan Dayton and Valerie Faris to audition for Highston, a television series from Sacha Baron Cohen and Amazon Studios. In September 2015, his casting was confirmed and the series was given a six-episode order. The series starred Pullman in the lead role as a 19-year-old whose imaginary friends were real-life celebrities. The pilot episode, guest-starring Flea and Shaquille O'Neal, was well received by critics. In December 2017, however, Highston was canceled after only one episode.

Pullman made his feature film acting debut in 2017 with The Ballad of Lefty Brown, a Western starring his father in the titular lead role. His additional roles in 2017 include the Arnold Schwarzenegger-led Aftermath, the British drama Lean on Pete, and the critically acclaimed film Battle of the Sexes, the latter also starring his father.

In 2018, Pullman had a leading role in the slasher film The Strangers: Prey at Night. Though the film received mixed reviews when compared to its predecessor, it was a box-office success, grossing $32.1 million against a $5 million production budget. That same year, he starred alongside Jeff Bridges, Cynthia Erivo, Dakota Johnson, Jon Hamm, Cailee Spaeny, and Chris Hemsworth in Bad Times at the El Royale. On casting Pullman, writer and director Drew Goddard said "it was one of those good old-fashioned casting searches. After meeting with lots and lots and lots of actors, Lewis came in and you just felt that immediately. The last time that happened, quite honestly, was when Chris Hemsworth walked in for The Cabin in the Woods. You're just looking for actors who inherently fit the role — and then also transcend the role. Lewis had that sort of magic." Upon release, the film received generally positive reviews from critics, and his performance was also singled out, with Den of Geek calling it a "standout" and The Seattle Times writing that he "shines as the troubled desk clerk, who serves as the film's (very) late-arriving moral conscience."

In 2019, Pullman had a recurring role as Major Major Major Major in Catch-22, the George Clooney-led Hulu adaptation of the 1961 novel. He also starred in the thriller Them That Follow, and in 2020, he had a small role in the indie film Pink Skies Ahead. In 2022, Pullman played Rhett Abbott in the Amazon series Outer Range, Lieutenant Robert "Bob" Floyd in the Tom Cruise-led sequel Top Gun: Maverick, and the romantic lead in Press Play. Top Gun: Maverick wrapped filming in 2019 but was delayed several times before releasing in 2022; it grossed over $1.4 billion in theaters and is Pullman's highest-grossing film to date. In 2023, Pullman played a youth pastor in The Starling Girl, the president of a fraternity in The Line, and had a major role in William Friedkin's final film, The Caine Mutiny Court-Martial. He also starred alongside Brie Larson in the Apple TV+ miniseries Lessons in Chemistry.

In 2024, he starred in the crime thriller Skincare and the James Wan-produced horror film adaptation of Stephen King's 1975 novel 'Salem's Lot.

In 2025, he starred as Robert Reynolds / Sentry in the Marvel Cinematic Universe film Thunderbolts*, and will reprise his role in Avengers: Doomsday in 2026. Pullman starred (2026) alongside Sally Field in Remarkably Bright Creatures, an adaptation of the bestselling novel of the same name by Shelby Van Pelt. Pullman also stars with Maya Hawke in the surrealist romantic comedy Wishful Thinking which had its world premiere at 2026 South by Southwest Film & TV Festival.

== Personal life ==
Between September 2020 and sometime before August 2023, Pullman was in a relationship with singer and actress Rainey Qualley.

Since January 2025, Pullman has been in a relationship with actress and model Kaia Gerber.

Pullman does not use social media to protect his personal life, maintain his mental health, and reduce digital stimuli.

== Filmography ==
Key
†	Denotes films that have not yet been released

=== Film ===
Lewis Pullman's film credits
Year	Title	Role	Notes
2013	The Tutor	James	Short film
2015	The Peter Cassidy Project	Henry Lovegood	Short film
2016	Where You Are	Adult James	Short film
2016	The Realest Real	Patrick	Short film
2017	The Ballad of Lefty Brown	Billy Kitchen	
2017	Aftermath	Adult Samuel	
2017	Lean on Pete	Dallas	
2017	Take A Hike	Bing	Short film
2017	Battle of the Sexes	Larry Riggs	
2018	The Strangers: Prey at Night	Luke	
2018	Bad Times at the El Royale	Miles Miller	
2018	Craig's Pathetic Freakout	Lewis	Short film
2019	Them That Follow	Garret Booner	
2019	Lefty/Righty	Righty	Short film
2020	The Voice in Your Head	Dan	Short film
2020	Pink Skies Ahead	Ben	
2021	Sorry I Missed This	Trevor	Short film
2022	Top Gun: Maverick	Lt. Robert "Bob" Floyd	
2022	Press Play	Harrison Knott	
2023	The Starling Girl	Owen Taylor	
2023	The Line	Todd Stevens	
2023	The Caine Mutiny Court-Martial	Lt. Thomas Keefer	
2023	Water Rises	Him	
2024	Skincare	Jordan Weaver	
2024	Riff Raff	Rocco Gauthier	
2024	Salem's Lot	Ben Mears	
2024	Guzzle Buddies	The Helper	Short film
2025	Thunderbolts*	Robert "Bob" Reynolds / Sentry / Void	
2025	The Testament of Ann Lee	William Lee	
2026	Wishful Thinking	Charlie	Also producer
2026	Remarkably Bright Creatures	Cameron Cassmore	
2026	Baton †	TBA	Post-production
2026	Avengers: Doomsday †	Robert "Bob" Reynolds / Sentry	Post-production
2027	Spaceballs: The New One †	Prince Starburst	Post-production

=== Television ===
Lewis Pullman's television credits
Year	Title	Role	Notes	Ref.
2019	Catch-22	Major Major Major Major	Miniseries; 4 episodes	
2022–2024	Outer Range	Rhett Abbott	Main role, 14 episodes	
2023	Lessons in Chemistry	Calvin Evans	Miniseries; 8 episodes	

=== Video games ===
Lewis Pullman's television credits
Year	Title	Role	Notes
2025	Goodnight Universe	Narrator	
2026	Battlefield 6	Lt. Robert "Bob" Floyd	Top Gun cross-over event

== Awards and nominations ==
Award	Year	Category	Work	Result
Astra Midseason Movie Awards	2025	Best Supporting Actor	Thunderbolts*	Nominated
Astra TV Awards	2024	Best Supporting Actor in a Limited Series or TV Movie	Lessons in Chemistry	Nominated
Astra TV Awards	2026	Best Actor in a Limited Series or TV Movie	Remarkably Bright Creatures	Nominated
Critics' Choice Awards	2024	Best Supporting Actor in a Movie/Miniseries	Lessons in Chemistry	Nominated
Critics' Choice Super Awards	2025	Best Actor in a Superhero Movie	Thunderbolts*	Nominated
Critics' Choice Super Awards	2025	Best Villain in a Movie	Thunderbolts*	Nominated
Independent Spirit Awards	2024	Best Supporting Performance in a New Scripted Series	Lessons in Chemistry	Nominated
Saturn Awards	2019	Best Supporting Actor	Bad Times at the El Royale	Nominated
Primetime Emmy Awards	2024	Outstanding Supporting Actor in a Limited or Anthology Series or Movie	Lessons in Chemistry	Nominated
