= Remarkably Bright Creatures =

Remarkably Bright Creatures may refer to:

- Remarkably Bright Creatures (novel), by American author Shelby Van Pelt
- Remarkably Bright Creatures (film), a 2026 mystery film directed by Olivia Newman
