= Ashley Connor =

American cinematographer

- Born: 1987 (age 38–39)
- Occupation: Cinematographer
- Years active: 2007–present
- Website: https://www.ashleyconnor.net/

Ashley Connor is an American cinematographer who is best known for her work on films such as Madeline's Madeline, The Miseducation of Cameron Post, The Death of Dick Long, and Thou Wast Mild and Lovely. She was nominated for an Independent Spirit Award in 2019 for Best Cinematography.

== Career ==
Growing up in Southern California, Ashley played a lot of sports but at the age of fifteen suffered an injury to her knees. Following surgery, she watched movies extensively until an interest in film as a profession arose. She gained industry acclaim from one of her earlier films, Thou Wast Mild and Lovely, where she was first noticed as a great user of the handheld technique. Most of her films are primarily improvised, with her shooting conversations in a way opposite to the "shot/reverse shot" style. As her career continued to progress, she was featured as a key speaker at SXSW in 2020. She has also given masterclasses for Seventh Row.

In addition to shooting major films and television series, she has shot music videos for the likes of Jemima Kirke, Alex Cameron, and others.

== Filmography ==
Year	Title	Director	Notes
2013	Butter on the Latch	Josephine Decker	
2014	Thou Wast Mild and Lovely	Josephine Decker	
2015	Funny Bunny	Alison Bagnall	
2016	Tramps	Adam Leon	
2017	Person to Person	Dustin Guy Defa	
2018	Mountain Rest	Alex O Eaton	
2018	The Miseducation of Cameron Post	Desiree Akhavan	
2018	Madeline's Madeline	Josephine Decker	
2018	First Match	Olivia Newman	
2019	The Death of Dick Long	Daniel Scheinert	
2019	Knives Out	Rian Johnson	Second unit photography
2021	Erēmīta (Anthologies)	Self, Sam Abbas, Alexis Zabe, and others	
2021	True Things	Harry Wootliff	
2022	Sharp Stick	Lena Dunham	
2023	Polite Society	Nida Manzoor	
2024	My First Film	Zia Anger	
2026	Remarkably Bright Creatures	Olivia Newman	
