= Madeline's Madeline =

2018 film directed by Josephine Decker

- Theatrical release poster
- Directed by: Josephine Decker
- Written by: Josephine Decker; Donna Di Novelli
- Produced by: Krista Parris; Elizabeth Rao
- Starring: Helena Howard; Molly Parker; Miranda July
- Cinematography: Ashley Connor
- Edited by: Harrison Atkins; Josephine Decker
- Music by: Caroline Shaw
- Production companies: Forager Film Company; Bow and Arrow Entertainment
- Distributed by: Oscilloscope Laboratories
- Release dates: January 22, 2018 (Sundance); August 10, 2018 (United States)
- Running time: 93 minutes
- Country: United States
- Language: English
- Budget: ~$500,000
- Box office: $185,576

Madeline's Madeline is a 2018 American drama film written and directed by Josephine Decker. It stars Helena Howard in her first film role, alongside Molly Parker and Miranda July. The film follows a teenage actress who is encouraged by her theater director to blur the lines between the character she is playing and her actual identity. The film is known for its experimental visuals and the improvisational process Decker used to create the story, not unlike the characters themselves.

The film had its world premiere at the Sundance Film Festival on January 22, 2018. It was released on August 10, 2018, by Oscilloscope Laboratories. The film received positive reviews, particularly for Howard's performance, which was hailed by IndieWire as one of the 50 best performances of the 2010s.

== Plot ==
Madeline is a lonely teenager who is part of a professional acting ensemble creating an experimental theater performance about The Three Little Pigs using improvisation. She enjoys the company of the other actors and their director Evangeline, and dreads having to go home to her mother Regina who doesn't understand Madeline and often starts arguments. One day at rehearsal, Madeline confesses to Evangeline that she had a dream in which she placed a hot iron on her mother. Struck by this dream, Evangeline decides to have the performers recreate it in an improv exercise. Madeline gets overwhelmed at how her life is conflating with her art and wanders out of the theater alone while Regina looks for her. After she finds Madeline, Regina discovers that Madeline's prescription for an unspecified mental illness has run out, and she struggles to get it quickly refilled.

Evangeline gradually makes Madeline's life the central focus of the theater performance they are devising. During a promotional photoshoot, Evangeline asks Regina to pose in the photo with Madeline. One rehearsal ends early, so Madeline goes to Evangeline's house for a birthday party, where she shows off her acting skills to the uncomfortable guests and hits on Evangeline's husband. After speaking with Evangeline about their mutual feelings of self-consciousness and vulnerability, Madeline reveals that she wants to leave the group and Evangeline agrees that Madeline should take a break from acting for a bit.

Madeline is relieved at her new found creative freedom but is dismayed when Evangeline stops by Madeline's house. She and Regina end up bonding over a couple glasses of wine, and Evangeline convinces Regina that she would be an excellent actor if she tried it. She tells Regina to stop by rehearsal the next day. All three women show up to the rehearsal, and Evangeline has them do an exercise where everyone pretends to be Regina, but Madeline's version of her mother is too real and it hits a nerve: Regina leaves the rehearsal crying.

Evangeline loves how real the emotions are, and asks the performers to recreate that scene again while she takes an important phone call outside. The performers are disgusted by the way Evangeline has been exploiting Madeline's emotions and identity, and they lock the door. They quickly devise a performance for Evangeline: a confrontational journey through the winding rehearsal building.

At first Evangeline objects to being shoved around by everyone, but eventually despite struggling, she is used as part of the performance. The troupe ends up outside in the street, all dancing together in the sunlight as Madeline walks in the opposite direction.

== Cast ==
- Helena Howard as Madeline
- Miranda July as Regina
- Molly Parker as Evangeline
- Okwui Okpokwasili as Nurse, KK
- Julee Cerda as Carrie
- Sunita Mani as Assistant Max
- Felipe Bonilla as Santos, Cousin Elmer
- Lisa Tharps as Laura
- Curtiss Cook as George
- Reynaldo Piniella as Jaime

== Production ==
Josephine Decker directed the film and wrote its screenplay. Camera work was handled by Ashley Connor, and music was composed by Caroline Shaw. The film's producers were Krista Parris and Elizabeth Rao.

Decker and Howard first met in 2014 at a teen arts festival that the director was judging. 15-year-old Howard performed a monologue from Blackbird by David Harrower, and Decker was so moved by the performance that she began to cry, which caused Howard to cry, too. Decker told her that it was the best performance she'd ever seen, and that she'd like them to work together on a film.

The film's story began as a fictionalized telling of Howard's own life, but Decker also wanted to explore her own anxieties as an artist. In her previous work Bi the Way and Flames, she had experiences where artists told others' stories in ways that she felt were exploitative, and she wanted to explore whether it would be possible to tell someone else's story faithfully.

In 2014, she began a series of workshops to devise the story, based on techniques she had learned at the Pig Iron Theatre Company in Philadelphia and the School of Making Thinking. Decker, Howard, and eleven other actors met about nine different times over the course of seven months. They used improvisation to create a variety of different scenes, many of which never ended up in the final film, and explored each performer's personal experiences, such as with mental illness. Cinematographer Ashley Connor also participated in some of the workshops because Decker wanted the camera to also be treated as a character. After all the workshops, Decker sat down and wrote a script that incorporated the best scenes they had created. In one draft of the script, she included a real-life event that had happened between her and Howard, and when she realized that it had crossed a line between the character Madeline and the actual Helena Howard, she decided to take the script in a more fictional direction. Decker realized from that experience that the character Evangeline would have enjoyed crossing boundaries like that, so she started incorporating that desire into her character.

Decker continued this collaborative style during production. At the beginning of each day of shooting, the cast and crew met for a short meditation and a chance for anyone to voice concerns they had with the production process. Many of the scenes were improvised, so Connor and gaffer David April lit the sets in such a way that the actors and camera could freely move anywhere without a light being in the shot. The visual style of the film incorporated camera techniques that Connor and Decker had discovered working on previous films together. Connor created a custom camera rig that allowed her to manipulate the focus in new ways, which Chris O'Falt of Indiewire described as "an almost liquid-like aspect to the focus, and the image if often slightly doubled or warped, while out-of-focus translucent objects come into the edges of frame to cause pockets of soft, sometimes colorful blurring."

Harrison Atkins was the editor for the first four months of post production and made over a hundred different cuts of the movie exploring various ways the story could be told, but when he had to leave to work on a different show, Decker took on the editing herself. Six months went by and she still wasn't satisfied with the film, so she brought on producer Liz Rao to help with editing for five weeks. With only two weeks left until the deadline for submitting to the Sundance Film Festival, Decker realized there was still a major problem with the ending, so she brought on David Barker for some last-minute changes. Spike Jonze and Mike Mills also offered advice during post-production.

== Release ==
Madeline's Madeline premiered at the Sundance Film Festival in January 2018, and the Berlin Film Festival Forum in February of the same year. Oscilloscope Laboratories acquired U.S. distribution rights and announced plans for a general release later in the year. The film initially was shown at only one theater in Manhattan, and was eventually expanded to 31 theaters.

== Reception ==
=== Critical response ===
On review aggregator Rotten Tomatoes, the film holds an approval rating of 88% based on 123 reviews, with an average rating of 7.7/10. The website's critics consensus reads, "Madeline's Madeline proves experimental cinema is alive and well – and serves as a powerful calling card for Helena Howard in her big-screen debut." Metacritic gives the film a weighted average score of 77 out of 100, based on 31 critics, indicating "generally favorable reviews".

Writing in The Village Voice, Bilge Ebiri called Madeline's Madeline "the best thing I saw at Sundance this year". IndieWire reviewer David Ehrlich described the film as "one of the boldest and most invigorating American films of the 21st century". A.O. Scott for the New York Times called it a "seductive, disturbing, exasperating movie," noting it blurs the line between "fantasy and reality, certainly, but also between authenticity and artifice, theater and therapy, art and life."

In The New Yorker, Richard Brody said "it packs an epic’s worth of expressive detail, imaginative incident, emotional variety and intensity, and aesthetic invention," adding that "Howard delivers a performance that is one of the most distinctive, most varied, and most extreme in its expressive array and technical power, of any teen performer in the history of cinema."

The film was well-received by Entertainment Weekly, which praised the "nuanced" portrayal of the protagonist and her growth as a "self-possessed" character dealing with dominating authority figures. WBUR in Boston named it one of the best films of 2018, describing the plot as "three women perform an intricate psychological dance, with two locked in a vicious tug-of-war for a third's affections." Ty Burr for the Boston Globe gave it 4/5 stars and called it "stunning." Peter Debruge for Variety was more reserved, with Debruge praising how it addressed multiple issues such as identity and a "form of penance by its director, Josephine Decker, for appropriating the lives of her collaborators." However, Debruge concluded it "mistakes intimacy for honesty, and it mis-assumes that audiences care nearly as much about the creative process as actors and directors do."

In 2019, Howard's performance was hailed by IndieWire as one of the 50 best performances of the 2010s decade.

=== Accolades ===
Awards
Award	Date of ceremony	Category	Recipient(s) and nominee(s)	Result	Ref(s)
Gotham Awards	November 26, 2018	Audience Award	Madeline's Madeline	Nominated	
Gotham Awards	November 26, 2018	Best Feature	Madeline's Madeline	Nominated	
Gotham Awards	November 26, 2018	Breakthrough Actor	Helena Howard	Nominated	
Independent Spirit Awards	February 23, 2019	Best Female Lead	Helena Howard	Nominated	
Independent Spirit Awards	February 23, 2019	Best Cinematography	Ashley Connor	Nominated	
Montclair Film Festival	May 6, 2018	Future/now - Special Jury Prize	Helena Howard	Won	
Sarasota Film Festival	April 14, 2018	Narrative Feature Film Competition	Helena Howard	Won	
Berlin International Film Festival	February 15, 2018	C.I.C.A.E. Award	Josephine Decker	Nominated	
Champs-Élysées Film Festival	June 10, 2018	Student Jury Award-Special Mention	Josephine Decker	Won	
Champs-Élysées Film Festival	June 10, 2018	Prix du Jury	Josephine Decker	Nominated	
Cleveland International Film Festival	March 29, 2019	Best American Independent Feature Film	Josephine Decker	Pending	
Dallas International Film Festival	May 3, 2018	Narrative Feature Film Competition	Josephine Decker	Won	
