= Helena Howard =

American actress (born 1998)

- Born: Kaitlyn Helena Howard; July 23, 1998 (age 28); New York City, U.S.
- Occupation: Actress
- Years active: 2014–present

Kaitlyn Helena Howard (born July 23, 1998) is an American actress. After being discovered by director Josephine Decker at age 15, she made her film debut in the drama film Madeline's Madeline (2018), which IndieWire named as one of the 50 best performances of the 2010s and The New Yorker listed as the second-best film performance of the 21st century.

== Early life ==
Howard was born on July 23, 1998, in New York City, New York. Her parents, both artists, are Julia Binet and Will Howard. Her mother is of Scandinavian and Eastern European descent, and her father is African American of mixed descent. She has a younger brother, Liam. Howard grew up in the New Jersey area, and attended the Union County Academy for Performing Arts.

== Career ==
After she was discovered by Josephine Decker in 2014 at the Union County Teen Arts Festival, where Decker was a judge, Howard starred in her critically acclaimed feature film Madeline's Madeline. This was Howard's screen debut and she played the titular role.

Howard was a participant in the festival, and recited a monologue from David Harrower's Blackbird. When she finished, Decker said of Howard's performance that it was "the best she had seen" in her life, and they both started crying. Decker and Howard exchanged some information after the show ended and met up a month or so later; Howard ultimately helped develop the story of the film through several improvisation workshops with Decker and others.

The film had its world premiere at the Sundance Film Festival on January 22, 2018. It was released on August 10, 2018, by Oscilloscope Laboratories. It received critical acclaim, particularly for Howard's performance, which IndieWire named one of the 50 best performances of the 2010s.

Howard's next role was in the short film Twist, which had its world premiere at the 2019 Tribeca Film Festival. She stars as Nora Reid in Amazon's The Wilds. Howard also appeared as Cleo in the film Shoplifters of the World.

== Filmography ==
=== Film and television ===
Key
†	Denotes films that have not yet been released

Year	Title	Role	Director	Notes
2018	Madeline's Madeline	Madeline	Josephine Decker	
2019	Twist	Hannah	Aly Migliori	Short film
2020–2022	The Wilds	Nora Reid	Various	TV series
2020	Don't Look Deeper	Aisha	Catherine Hardwicke	TV series
2021	Shoplifters of the World	Cleo	Stephen Kijak	
2021	Side Street	Main love interest	Tyler Okonma	Teaser video
2021	WusYaName	Tyler's girl in interest	Tyler Okonma	Music video
2024	I Saw the TV Glow	Isabel	Jane Schoenbrun	
2025	Find Your Friends	Amber	Izabel Pakzad	
2026	The Accompanist	Wanda	Zach Woods	Post-production

== Awards and nominations ==
Year	Award	Category	Work	Result	Reference
2018	Gotham Awards	Breakthrough Actor	Madeline's Madeline	Nominated	
2018	Independent Spirit Awards	Best Female Lead	Madeline's Madeline	Nominated	
