= Sarah Small =

American artist, composer, singer, filmmaker, photographer

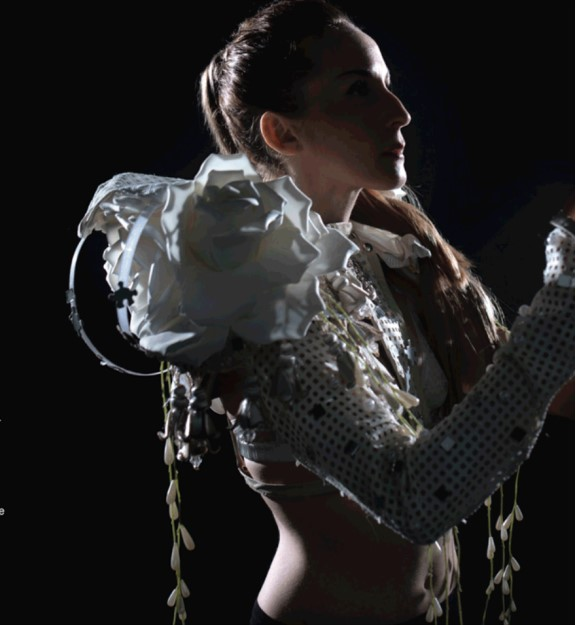
- Born: 1979 (age 46–47); Washington D.C., USA
- Education: B.A. in Photography from Rhode Island School of Design
- Occupations: Composer, Vocalist, Filmmaker, Performer, Director, Photographer
- Known for: Tableau Vivant (performance); Black Sea Hotel (vocal ensemble); The Delirium Constructions (photography series); Butter on the Latch (film); Secondary Dominance (performance, album, film)
- Parent: Father: Haskell Small
- Website: https://www.sarahsmall.com/

Sarah Small (born 1979 in Washington D.C.) is a Brooklyn-based American artist, composer, singer, filmmaker, photographer, and performer featured on Yo-Yo Ma's Silk Road Ensemble's GRAMMY-Winning album, Sing Me Home. She is known for her photographic and Tableau Vivant performance series The Delirium Constructions, singing as part of the Balkan vocal trio Black Sea Hotel, acting as the protagonist in the feature film Butter on the Latch by Josephine Decker, and directing the musical album, new music opera performance, and feature film Secondary Dominance.

== Education and career ==
She attended high school at The Field School, in Washington, D.C. and graduated from the Rhode Island School of Design in 2001 with a bachelor's degree in photography.

After graduating from college, Small moved to Brooklyn and worked as a photographer for 13 years. Her work has appeared in publications including Vogue, Life Magazine, The New York Times, The Washington Post, and The Wall Street Journal, has been showcased by John Schaefer on WNYC’s Soundcheck and National Public Radio, and exhibited globally at venues including Galerie Caprice Horn (Berlin), Corcoran Gallery of Art (Washington DC), and the Australian Centre for Photography. She was named one of the “Top 13 Emerging Photographers” working today, by American Photo Magazine.

In 2002, Small began studying Bulgarian vocal production in a start-up Bulgarian women's choir, Yasna Voices. In 2006, Yasna Voices traveled on grant to Bulgaria to study with master singer Kremena Stancheva, a founding member of the Bulgarian women’s choir, Le Mystère des Voix Bulgares.

In 2007, Small co-formed Brooklyn's Balkan vocal ensemble, Black Sea Hotel. She has premiered original works with Kronos Quartet in collaboration with Black Sea Hotel at St. Ann's Warehouse. and National Sawdust, and on stage with Reggie Watts and Sxip Shirey and Joe’s Pub. The vocal trio was featured in Small's Tableau Vivant of The Delirium Constructions in 2011 and headlined the Lund Choral Festival in Scandinavia in 2018. Black Sea Hotel has taught Balkan folk singing internationally, with a specialization in songs from Shopluk, Bulgaria. Highlights include teaching residences at Sjöviks Folkhögskola in Sweden.

In 2009, she taught Portrait Photography to seniors at the Parsons School of Design, and has taught darkroom photography to children and adults. In 2011, her 120-participant Tableau Vivant performance was featured in The Washington Post and The New York Times.

In 2012, Small formed Hydra, another vocal trio, and performed with Sean Ono Lennon and Taxiplasm at The Box.

In 2014, Small starred in Butter on the Latch, a psychological thriller film directed by Josephine Decker, which was on The New Yorker's “10 Best Movies of 2014.”

In 2016, Small was invited by Beth Morrison and HERE Arts Center’s PROTOTYPE Festival to premiere her work “Secondary Dominance” on stage, which has since been made into several music videos and a feature film.

As a photographer and performance artist, Small has exhibited and lectured internationally for The Lucie Foundation,, Apple Store Soho, and at the China International Photographic Exhibition granted by the Ministry of Culture of China.

== Select photography exhibitions ==
- 2017 - Fast Forward//Rewind, Museum of Contemporary Art of Georgia, Atlanta, Georgia, US
- 2011 - Human Time Space, DOB Hua Lamphong Gallery, Bangkok, Thailand
- 2011 - Neubacher Inaugural Exhibition, Neubacher Shor Contemporary, Toronto, Canada
- 2010 - 100 Portraits - 100 Photographers, Fotoweek DC, Corcoran Gallery of Art, Washington, D.C., US
- 2010 - Art of Photography Show, Lyceum Gallery, San Diego, California, US
- 2010 - Vignettes, Bleicher/GoLightly Gallery, Santa Monica, California, US
- 2010 - Art Taipei Forum, Taipei World Trade Center, Taipei, Taiwan
- 2009 - Bova Images Festival, Bova, Calabria, Italy
- 2008 - Delight and Horror: The Photographs of Sarah Small, 1000 Words Photography
- 2007 - Soft Ground, Platform Gallery, Winnipeg, Canada
- 2004 - Art+Commerce Festival, Emerging Photographers, Tobacco Warehouse, Brooklyn, NY, US

== Select performance art ==
- 2017 - PROTOTYPE Festival - Secondary Dominance
- 2011 - Powerhouse Arena - Tableau Vivant of the Delirium Constructions
- 2011 - Bathhouse Arena - Tableau Vivant of the Delirium Constructions
- 2011 - Skylight One Hanson, Williamsburg Clocktower Building - Tableau Vivant of the Delirium Constructions
- 2010 - 92Y Tribeca - Tableau Vivant of the Delirium Constructions

== Filmography ==
Title	Type	Year	Producer	Performer	Director	Composer	Singer	Photographer	Ref
Docuconcoction of the Delirium Constructions	Documentary film	2024	Yes	Yes	Yes	Yes	Yes	No	
Secondary Dominance	Feature film	2023	Yes	Yes	Yes	Yes	Yes	No	
Don’t Worry Darling	Feature film	2022	No	No	No	No	Yes	No	
The Autopsy of Jane Doe	Feature film	2016	No	No	No	No	Yes	No	
Collective: Unconscious	Anthology film	2016	No	Yes	No	No	No	No	
Thou Wast Mild and Lovely	Feature film	2014	Yes	No	No	No	No	No	
Butter on the Latch	Feature film	2013	No	Yes	No	No	Yes	No	
Tableau Vivant of the Delirium Constructions (filmed at Skylight One Hanson, 2011)	Short Film	2011	No	Yes	Yes	Yes	Yes	No	
Team Queen	Short film/Music video	2007	No	No	No	No	No	Yes	
Molotov Samba	Feature film	2005	No	No	No	No	No	Yes	
Neurotica	Short film	2003	No	No	No	No	No	Yes	

== Discography ==
Year	Artist	Title	Type
2023	Sarah Small	Boomerang of Black Fluorescence	Album
2023	Sarah Small	Behind the Gymnasium	Chamber Work
2019	Sarah Small	Secondary Dominance	Album
2016	Silk Road Ensemble	Sing Me Home	Single: “Sadila Jana”
2014	Jessi Colter and Lenny Kaye	The Psalms	Single: “Psalm 81”
2014	Hydra	Hydra	Single: “Sonnet 81”
2014	Hydra	Hydra	Single: “Wake Up”
2013	Black Sea Hotel	The Forest is Shaking and Swaying	Album
2010	Ansambl Mastika	Songs & Dances for Life Nonstop	Single: “Iskupav Poema”

== Select music photography ==
- 2014 Brooklyn Rider, The Brooklyn Rider Almanac
- 2009 Kitka, Cradle Songs
- 2008 Jan Vogler, Tango!
- 2008 Martin Bisi, Sirens of the Apocalypse
- 2007 Jan Vogler, Concerti Brillanti
- 2006 Shara Nova's My Brightest Diamond, Bring Me the Workhorse

== Select photography awards ==
- 2010 - Selected as 1 of 50 Top Finalists for Artists Wanted: Exposure 2010
- 2010 - Selected by Magenta Foundation as 2010 US Flash Forward winner
- 2009 - “10 Best 10” Photo Contest Winner - Resource Magazine and Win-Initiative
- 2009 - 1 of 2 American finalists selected from 65 countries by ITS#EIGHT International Talent Support, to be flown to Italy for exhibition and award ceremony.
- 2009 - Selected 1st Place winner for 2009 Fine Art Xto Nude Image Awards to be exhibited in Farmani Gallery in July.
- 2009 - Winner of Magnet Media's Zoom-In-Online Viewfinder's Challenge, judged by David Turner and Redux Pictures Director, Marcel Saba.
- 2008 - Chosen as 1 of 13 Top Emerging Talents by American Photo Magazine.
- 2008 - Avant Guardian Competition Winner - Surface Magazine
- 2008 - Finalist - Critical Mass Competition
- 2004 - Emerging Photographer Competition Winner - Art + Commerce
