= Geoff Marslett =

American film director

Geoff Marslett is an American film director, writer, producer, animator and actor. His early career started with the animated short Monkey vs. Robot which was distributed internationally by Spike and Mike's Classic Festival of Animation on video and Spike and Mike's Sick and Twisted Festival of Animation in theatres. More recently he directed several successful narrative feature films including MARS, as well as producing and acting in the experimental documentary Yakona. He appears onscreen in Josephine Decker's Thou Wast Mild and Lovely which was released theatrically in 2014. He currently resides in Austin, Texas and splits his time between filmmaking and teaching at the University of Colorado at Boulder.

== Bio ==
Geoff Marslett grew up in North Texas. After high school he studied philosophy and math at St. John's College in Santa Fe, New Mexico and Annapolis, Maryland where he earned his BA from their Great Books Program in 1996. In 2000 he received his MFA in film production from the University of Texas at Austin.

== Career ==
While in graduate school he completed his first animated short Monkey vs. Robot (not to be confused with Nate Pommer's live action version that came out a few months later). This 2 1/2-minute short was based on a song by musician and comic artist James Kochalka. The short was completed in 1999 and went on to play over a dozen major film festivals including Palm Springs Shorts Festival (1999), The Dallas Video Fest (1999), Taos Talking Pictures Film Festival (2000), South by Southwest Film Festival (2000), and Slamdance Film Festival (2001). It won jury awards at MicroCine Film Festival in Baltimore, Maryland and CinemaTexas in Austin, Texas and was then included as a part of Spike and Mike's Classic Festival of Animation vol. 7 and Spike and Mike's Sick and Twisted Festival of Animation in theatres. It also appeared on television including airing on PBS' EGG, the Arts Show, Univision, and HBO Central Europe. It won jury awards at Cinematexas Film Festival and Microcine Film Festival in 1999. The Phoenix New Times said "it should become the new national anthem" and Cashiers du Cinemart said "that it's something I'd like to start my mornings with every day for the rest of my life."

=== MARS ===
Marslett's first feature film was the animated, sci-fi, romantic comedy MARS which premiered at the South By Southwest Film Festival in 2010. The film stars Mark Duplass, Paul Gordon, Zoe Simpson, Howe Gelb, Michael Dolan, Liza Weil, James Kochalka, Cynthia Watros, and Kinky Friedman with appearances by Nicole Atkins and Don Hertzfeldt. MARS went on to play at over 50 festivals including BAMCinemafest, Sitges Festival International de Cinema Fantastic de Catalunya, BFI London Film Festival, Sidewalk Moving Pictures, and The Maryland Film Festival. It won several jury awards including honors from IndieMemphis, The Dallas Video Fest, The San Francisco Independent Film Festival and Just For Laughs Chicago. It received generally favorable press including being called "realistic, but still stylized and dreamlike" by Wired. The Village Voice describes MARS as "an inter-planetary indie that takes place in a world—and a format—of his [Marslett's] invention" and calls the look and tone "spacey, soothing, and strange.". Time Out London writes "Mars isn't just visually striking, it's also full of humour, heart and super-cute cartoon Martians", and New York Magazine made it a critics pick when it played in Brooklyn. MARS was often noted for its visual style that The Washington Post said "eschews the mildly trippy look in favor of bold outlines, solid colors and a comic-book sensibility".

The increasing popularity of Mark Duplass as an actor and the strange animation style have made the film something of a cult film for sci-fi genre fans four years later.

It is worth noting that Marslett also co-wrote (with Tray Duncan) some of the software they used to animate MARS.

=== Loves Her Gun ===
Marslett's second feature film was a live action drama Loves Her Gun in which all the dialogue was improvised. The film starred Trieste Kelly Dunn, Francisco Barreiro, Ashley Rae Spillers, Melissa Bisagni and Marslett. It premiered at The 2013 South by Southwest Film Festival. At SXSW Loves Her Gun won the prestigious Louis Black Lone Star Filmmaker Award. After playing a dozen Film Festivals and winning several additional awards it opened commercially in New York City. Though critics were more divided on this film than on Marslett's previous work, the majority gave it positive reviews. The New York Times made it a critic's pick and said Loves Her Gun is one of the most soothing examinations of fear you're ever likely to see. Adopting an appealingly low-key approach to a high-stakes subject, this gently observant drama from Geoff Marslett takes its sweet time introducing the girl to the gun, but when it does, we're all but guaranteed to care." Think Progress referred to it as "An essential film about women and violence". However, The Hollywood Reporter said the "Meandering film is at odds with its subject's psychological tension." The actors' performances and Marslett's direction of them were praised even by critics who had other critiques of the film.

=== Yakona ===
Marslett worked as one of the producers of the feature-length documentary Yakona (directed by Anlo Sepulveda and Paul Collins). Yakona premiered at the South by Southwest Film Festival in 2014 and won the Audience Choice Award for the Visions category. Yakona is an experimental documentary told from the point of view of the San Marcos river without the use of dialogue or voice overs. Yakona won additional awards at the Oak Cliff Film Festival for Best Documentary and the Muybridge Award for Best Cinematography and at The Rainer Independent Film Fest for Best Cinematography. Yakona made its Canadian premiere at the Vancouver International Film Festival and was the closing night film for Diego Luna and Gael Garcia Bernal's traveling documentary film festival Ambulante, California in Los Angeles.

=== The Phantom 52 ===
The animated short film premiered at Sundance in 2019. The film is about a lonely trucker who is whalepromorphized. He may be a ghost or possibly a whale who speaks in a frequency no other whale can hear. The film is partially based on a real whale (often referred to as the loneliest whale). The film stars Tom Skerritt.

=== Quantum Cowboys ===
This hybrid animation-live action feature film stars Lily Gladstone, Kiowa Gordon, John Way, Gary Farmer, Neko Case, John Doe, Howe Gelb, Alex Cox, Patrick Page, Trieste Kelly Dunn, Frank Mosley and David Arquette. It is also the final screen appearance of Anna Karina. It is a physics western and premiered at the Annecy Film Festival in 2022 where it won the best music award.

=== Acting ===
Marslett has also appeared in front of the camera in several productions. He appears briefly in his own film MARS as Casey's dad and has a supporting role in his own film Loves Her Gun as Danny. He also plays the angry grad student in his segment of the Slacker 2011 remake of Richard Linklater's 1991 film Slacker. He has acted for other directors. He played the Shanty Santa in the short film The Quiet Girl's Guide to Violence which premiered at the 2012 Fantastic Fest. His comedic effort in SXSW 2012's Theatre Bum film bumpers was popular enough that it was included again in 2013's collection of best bumpers from the last 20 years. He played Jack "Coffee" Hays in the reenactments for the feature documentary Yakona. He appeared as Richard in Josephine Decker's Thou Wast Mild and Lovely which premiered at the Berlin Film Festival in 2014 and was released in theatres by IFP as part of the Screen Forward program. He has also appeared in Izzy Shill's feature film Going Nowhere in 2022 as well as portraying the Unabomber (Ted Kaczynski) on the television program Murder Made Me Famous.

=== Other film-related work ===
All of Marslett's films (as a director or producer), including MARS, Loves Her Gun, Yakona, and his Slacker 2011 segment, have been noted for their strong attachment to and representation of the locations they take place in. They are also noted for their sense of whimsy and their meandering and soothing tone. His continuing work in independent film earned him a spot on Filmmaker Magazine's "25 New Faces of Independent Film" in 2009

Marslett has served on the jury for several festivals including The South by Southwest Film Festival, Hell's Half Mile, Cine Las Americas, Anchorage Film Festival, Palm Springs Short Film Festival and Future Places (in Porto, Portugal). He is also on the ambassador's council for the Cucalorus Film festival in Wilmington, North Carolina.

== Teaching ==
In addition to making films, Geoff has taught in the Radio-Television-Film department at The University of Texas at Austin since 2001. In 2009 he was awarded the university's top undergraduate teaching award "The Board of Regents Outstanding Teaching Award". He also taught at Carnegie Mellon School of Drama. He is currently an associate professor at the University of Colorado at Boulder Cinema Studies and Moving Image Arts Department.

== Notable filmography (as director or producer) ==
- Monkey vs. Robot (animated short) (2000)
- Six in Austin (directed the Out of Bounds segment)(2004)
- Eight Movements (experimental documentary short co-director with photographer Melanie West)(2005)
- Bubblecraft (animated short) (2006)
- MARS (narrative animated feature) (2010)
- Slacker 2011 (directed TV Backpacker segment) (2011)
- SXSW Film Trailers (shorts) (2012)
- Loves Her Gun (narrative feature) (2013)
- Yakona (feature documentary) (2014)
- Everything Changes (animated/experimental short) (2018)
- The Phantom 52 (animated short) (2019)
- Quantum Cowboys (live action/animation hybrid feature) (2022)
