= Saturday Morning Mystery =

- Official theatrical release poster with original title
- Directed by: Spencer Parsons
- Written by: Jory Balsimo; Aaron Leggett; Jonny Mars; Spencer Parsons; Jason Wehling; Jason Wehling
- Starring: Ashley Spillers; Josephine Decker; Jonny Mars; Adam Tate; Paul Gordon
- Cinematography: Drew Daniels
- Edited by: Spencer Parsons; Don Swaynos
- Distributed by: XLrator Media
- Release date: June 16, 2012 (Los Angeles Film Festival)
- Running time: 83 minutes
- Country: United States
- Language: English

Saturday Morning Mystery (originally released as Saturday Morning Massacre) is a 2012 independent horror film by Spencer Parsons that premiered at the 2012 Los Angeles Film Festival. The movie is a dark parody/spoof of the Scooby-Doo cartoon series. Parsons cited Re-Animator and Basket Case as inspirations for the film.

Saturday Morning Mystery had a projected video on demand release date of July 17, 2013 and a limited theatrical release date of August 9, 2013. The movie was released to DVD on August 20, 2013.

== Plot ==
The brainy Nancy is part of a financially destitute paranormal debunking team composed of her best friend Gwen, Gwen’s boyfriend Chad, Nancy’s ex-boyfriend Floyd and his dog Hamlet. After a particularly disastrous paranormal investigation ends with the group ruining a police investigation, Nancy is keen to take a job debunking the Kyser mansion for a bank employee who wants to sell the property. On the drive to the mansion the group runs into Officer Lance, who tells them of the mansion's history. The property was purchased by the Kysers, who opened up a church and school on the grounds. The family was rumored to have performed Satanic rituals that involved the human sacrifice of their children and others, which the townspeople believe was the reason the Kysers did not want to sell their land to a real estate developer that wanted to build a mall on the property.

Lance lets the group onto the property, where they promptly discover a pentagram made of twigs. He dismisses this as a childish prank by locals, but still gives Nancy his contact information in case of emergencies as well as a way to flirt with her. During this time Chad experiences what he believes to be a psychic vision of the Kysers and their Satanic practices; however, the group's investigations discover little on the property. Later that night Floyd uses the group's monitoring equipment to spy on Chad and Gwen having sex, during which time he sees an unknown person watching them as well. He runs to warn them, which makes the couple angry until they see that the group's van is now on fire, stranding them on the property. The group becomes even more frightened and angry once Floyd reveals that he had accidentally spiked the group's drinking water in an attempt to hide his LSD from Officer Lance.

As the night progresses the group discovers the body of the bank employee that hired Nancy, forcing them to realize that there is something at the house. This is further confirmed when they try to locate the group's dog Hamlet, only to find that he has been killed and partially eaten by a feral child. The group is then picked off one by one until only Gwen and Nancy remain, trapped by a man wearing a leather mask. They're rescued by Lance and the trio tries to escape, only for the adult male killer to knock Lance unconscious and drag him off. Nancy and Gwen both go back into the house to rescue him and in the process discover the killers' lair, which is filled with children's toys. This prompts Gwen to theorize that the killers are actually Mona and Frankie, the two Kyser children that had managed to escape from their parents' attempt to kill both their children and themselves. She further opines that the Kysers had not been Satanists, but had been accused of being as such due to them refusing to sell their land to the real estate developers.

The two women try to use this revelation to their advantage when they discover that the two now-fully grown Kyser children have Lance tied to a chair. Nancy somewhat successfully tries to lure them away from Lance by distracting the Kysers with false sympathy, but Gwen is grievously injured in the process. Nancy manages to kill Frankie Kyser and attempts to help Gwen, who tells Nancy that she is beyond saving and pleads with her to end her life. She tearfully obliges Gwen's wish and then tries to escape with Lance, but is ambushed by Mona Kyser. After a struggle Nancy kills her assailant and gets Lance to his patrol car, only for the two to then be attacked by the feral child that had killed the dog.

== Cast ==
- Ashley Rae Spillers as Nancy
- Josephine Decker as Gwen
- Adam Tate as Chad
- Jonny Mars as Floyd
- Paul Gordon as Officer Lance
- Heather Kafka as Mona Kyser
- Sean Ryan as Frankie Kyser

== Production ==
Filming for Saturday Morning Mystery took place in Austin, Texas, with the script being written to fit the house the movie was set in. Much of the film was shot in sequence, with Parsons stating that the shooting schedule helped set the tone for many scenes.

== Reception ==
Initial reception to Saturday Morning Mystery has been mostly positive. Shock Till You Drop praised Paul Gordon's acting but panned the film overall, stating it didn't live up to its potential. Film School Rejects gave the film a B+ rating, writing that the movie "succeeds as a horror with touches of drama and comedy all while spoofing a Saturday morning cartoon". Film Threat rated the film at four stars, citing the film as "fun" while being slightly disappointed with the resolution. The Hollywood Reporter panned the film, writing that "the entire project has the appearance of messy, hasty planning" and that "performances shade more toward awkward than knowing, while production quality is variable". StarPulse.com chose actress Ashley Spiller as their "best performance by an actress" for the film festival and the LA Weekly praised the movie for its "good scares". Bloody Disgusting gave the film four out of five skulls. A reviewer for Ain't It Cool News called Saturday Morning Massacre "one of the best" films he'd seen this year.

== See also ==
- Lost Mysteries
