= Tenderness (2009 film) =

2009 film by John Polson

- Poster
- Directed by: John Polson
- Screenplay by: Emil Stern
- Based on: Tenderness by Robert Cormier
- Produced by: John Penotti; Charles Randolph; Howard Meltzer
- Starring: Russell Crowe; Jon Foster; Sophie Traub
- Cinematography: Tom Stern
- Edited by: Lisa Zeno Churgin; Andrew Marcus
- Music by: Jonathan Goldsmith
- Production companies: GreeneStreet Films; Turtleback
- Distributed by: Lionsgate (North America, United Kingdom, Australia and South Africa); Hoyts Distribution (Australia)
- Release dates: January 15, 2009 (Israel); December 11, 2009 (US)
- Running time: 101 minutes
- Countries: Australia; United States
- Language: English

Tenderness is a 2009 crime film directed by John Polson and written by Emil Stern, based on the novel of the same name by Robert Cormier. Starring Russell Crowe, Jon Foster, Sophie Traub, and Laura Dern, the film follows the intersecting lives of three people - a young man just released from jail, a girl looking for escape who becomes fascinated with him and the police detective who is sure the boy will kill again.

The film received mixed reviews, with some critics highlighting the formulaic nature of the story as a problem.

== Plot ==
Lori is an unhappy 15/16-year-old girl who lives with her single mother. She receives sexual attention from men, including her boss at a retail store and her mother's boyfriend Gary. Eric Komenko is an 18-year-old boy who has killed his parents. Incarcerated, Komenko frequently gets visits from Lt. Cristofuoro, the detective who arrested him. Lt. Cristofuoro is convinced Komenko is a psychopath, that he killed two teenage girls previously, and that he will kill again. After Eric is released from the juvenile detention facility, he lives with his aunt. His release attracts some media attention, which leads Lori to seek out Eric at his home. Lori gets in the back of Eric's car to seek shelter from rain, and she falls asleep.

When Eric leaves for the weekend to meet another girl at an amusement park, Lori pops up from under a blanket while Eric is driving. The scare and near accident which follows cause a bit of a situation with the police.

Reluctantly and not knowing what else to do, Eric allows Lori to continue the journey with him. Lori, who is starved for attention and morbidly enamored by his crimes, flirts with Eric and repeatedly makes advances towards him. Eric, angered by her efforts, refuses her. In a desperate attempt to gain his affection, Lori tells him she saw him kiss a girl down by a river shortly before he murdered his parents.

Eric realizes she saw him with the girl he choked to death in his first, unsolved murder, and makes several half-hearted attempts to kill Lori. Each time he is thwarted, either by Lori or by other circumstances. In a motel room, Lori invites Eric to strangle her, even professing her love for him. Eric, confused and angry, walks away.

At the amusement park, Eric meets Maria. As he walks around the park with Maria, Lori seethes with jealousy. Maria flirts with Eric and offers to take him to a secluded area of the park to be alone. He gives Maria a necklace he bought for her on the trip.

As he clasps it around her neck, it is revealed that Maria was bait by Lt. Cristofuoro in a plot to find Eric in order to trap him before he repeats his past mistakes. Lori warns him of the trap before he can harm Maria. Because Lt. Cristofuoro cannot charge Eric with a crime, Eric is released but Lt. Christofuoro, hoping to keep her safe, warns Lori of Eric's nature.

Lori pleads with Eric to make a boat trip, Lori commits suicide by allowing herself to fall into the water although she is unable to swim. Eric, knowing he will be accused of killing her, tries to save her, but to no avail.

Eric is then seen in the custody of a penitentiary in Lt. Cristofuoro's presence. Although he admits to believing Eric's explanation of how Lori died, Lt. Cristofuoro explains to Eric that he belongs in prison. Refusing to vouch for Eric, Lt. Cristofuoro lets Lori's death keep Eric imprisoned.

In the end, it is revealed that Lori saw Eric put the dead girl in the river, revealing the end twist that the whole while she was trying to have him kill her, and that she had finally committed suicide when she found out he wouldn't.

== Cast ==
- Russell Crowe as Lt. Cristofuoro
- Jon Foster as Eric Komenko
- Sophie Traub as Lori
- Laura Dern as Teresa, Eric's aunt
- Alexis Dziena as Maria
- Arija Bareikis as Marsha, Lori's mother
- Michael Kelly as Gary, Marsha's boyfriend
- Tim Hopper as Dan Komenko
- C. S. Lee as a highway patrolman

== Production ==
The scenes in the juvenile detention center were shot at the Arthur Kill Correctional Facility in Staten Island, New York City. It was also shot in the county of Rockland, New York.

It is revealed on the DVD that the producers only convinced Crowe to take on the project after expanding his role and giving his character a voiceover narration.

== Reception ==
On Rotten Tomatoes it has an approval rating of 40% based on reviews from 15 critics, with an average rating of 5.14/10.

Russell Edwards of Variety wrote that it "initially tantalizes but fails to deliver". Stephen Holden of The New York Times wrote, "Tenderness is a movie undone by its formulaic plot conventions, and its need to give its star more screen time than his characters merits."
