= Thou Wast Mild and Lovely =

2014 experimental thriller film

- Directed by: Josephine Decker
- Written by: Josephine Decker
- Produced by: Laura Heberton; Laura Klein; Interests Lavalette; Russell Sheaffer
- Starring: Joe Swanberg; Sophie Traub; Robert Longstreet
- Cinematography: Ashley Connor
- Edited by: David Butler; Josephine Decker; Steven Schardt
- Music by: Molly Herron; Jeff Young
- Distributed by: Cinelicious
- Release dates: February 7, 2014 (Berlin International Film Festival); April 11, 2014
- Running time: 94 minutes
- Country: United States
- Language: English

Thou Wast Mild and Lovely is a 2014 experimental thriller film written and directed by Josephine Decker and starring Joe Swanberg, Sophie Traub, and Robert Longstreet.

== Plot ==
Akin is hired to work a summer job on a farm owned by Jeremiah and his daughter Sarah. As he arrives at the property, he removes his wedding ring before getting out of the car, and tells the other two he is single and has no children. He is given a room to live at the farm for the summer. Jeremiah drinks a lot, and gives Akin the nickname "shoulders" because he thinks the man's shoulders are always tense from keeping a secret. Akin tries to talk to his wife Drew on the phone, but the poor cell service makes it difficult. Sarah and Akin become interested in each other from afar, and spy on each other multiple times. While the two of them are tracking down a lost cow at the edge of the property, Sarah finds a frog and bites its head off, which causes Akin to finally kiss her and ultimately rape her. She smiles afterwards.

When Akin tells the other two at dinner that he has a roommate, Jeremiah reveals that he knows Akin's secret: the tan line on his finger makes it obvious that he's married. Jeremiah jokes that he too has a roommate that he has kept alive for a long time by continuing to clean his wounds. Sarah finds a family photo in Akin's room the next day, which shows he also has a son. Sarah and Akin continue to spend time together, and she teaches him how to improve his horseback skills.

The landline phone rings, and Drew is on the other end explaining that she's been trying to contact them because she hasn't heard from Akin in a while. She tells him that she and their son are going to come visit the farm. The visit goes well at first, but during dinner when Drew comments about Akin being "quiet", Sarah responds that he has been very talkative to her. Jeremiah explains that Akin had been lying about his marriage to get closer to Sarah, causing an awkward silence. That night, Drew is lying on the couch drunk, barely conscious. Jeremiah starts saying vulgar, sexual things about her, so Akin carries her to his room. He awakes later to an empty bed, and finds Drew back in the house chatting with Sarah. They mention that Drew and Akin had a daughter who had died. Sarah blindfolds Akin and the three of them begin to have sex together. In the middle of the act, Akin removes the blindfold and sees that Jeremiah and a neighbor have been watching them. Jeremiah attacks the neighbor and tries to force himself on Drew. Akin tries to carry Drew away, but Jeremiah knocks him out.

Akin awakes tied up inside the barn, where he sees a man's face that is covered in wounds and blood. Sarah appears and cuts Akin loose. They return to the house to find Jeremiah with a knife. He stabs Akin, but Sarah reacts by shooting him. As Sarah is crying over Jeremiah's dying body, Drew storms in with an axe and swings it on both Sarah and Jeremiah. Akin and Drew grab their son who is wandering the yard crying, and drive away.

== Cast ==
- Joe Swanberg as Akin
- Sophie Traub as Sarah
- Robert Longstreet as Jeremiah
- Kristin Slaysman as Drew
- Matt Orme as Caren
- Geoff Marslett as Richard

== Production ==
To raise money for the film's post-production, Decker ran a crowdfunding campaign on the website Kickstarter with a goal of $15,500. The campaign closed on August 22, 2013, having successfully raised $18,517. Decker has cited John Steinbeck's novel East of Eden as inspiration for elements of the film, though David Rooney of The Hollywood Reporter has compared the visuals of the film to the works of Terrence Malick. The visual style continues some of the experimental camera techniques Decker and cinematographer Ashley Connor had used in their previous collaboration, Butter on the Latch, including some shots that were recorded without a lens on the camera.

== Release ==
In September 2014, Thou Wast Mild and Lovely was picked up for theatrical and VOD distribution by Cinelicious Pics along with Decker's 2013 film Butter on the Latch with a release set for November 2014.

== Reception ==
=== Critical response ===
Thou Wast Mild and Lovely received a positive response from critics. Richard Brody of The New Yorker highly praised the film, saying "Like most classic stories, this one is simple, but its realization is so surprising in its details, so original in its visual invention, as to make most other movies seem shot by the numbers." and "Normally it would be an insult to say that a movie that runs a mere hour and a quarter feels as if it were much longer, but here it’s both accurate and high praise: vast realms of emotional experience are condensed into the movie’s brief span." In a subsequent piece for The New Yorker, Brody named Thou Wast Mild and Lovely the second best film of 2014, just behind Wes Anderson's The Grand Budapest Hotel. Brody also listed Robert Longstreet as "Best Supporting Actor"; Ashley Connor in "Best Cinematography". Decker's other 2014 film, Butter on the Latch, also made the Brody's top ten, clocking in at tenth place. Subsequent to its Berlinale 2014 premiere, Peter Knegt of Indiewire called Thou Wast Mild and Lovely "The talk of the Berlin International Film Festival… with tense eroticism and experimental, largely free-form filmmaking". Josh Slater-Williams of Sound on Sight called it "one of the strongest, most striking American Gothic works of recent memory." In his review of the film, Eric Kohn of Indiewire gave the film a B+ rating and commented, "Its labyrinthine characteristics suggest the unholy marriage of Ingmar Bergman and David Lynch" and "Decker concocts a wholly enveloping vision of isolation told with a grimly poetic style that wanders all over the place but never stops playing by its own eerie rulebook." Jenni Miller of The A.V. Club moderately praised the film and described Sophie Traub's Sarah as "fascinating", despite noting "There are a few too many experimental flourishes to effectively build the sort of tension that’s necessary to really make the ending pay off." Nicolas Rapold of The New York Times gave the film a more mixed review, noting "The setup's clichés grow harder to ignore, despite a welcome mischievous streak and some bucolic imagery." David Rooney of The Hollywood Reporter stated, "It's not uninteresting but too self-consciously arty to rank Decker as a mature filmmaking voice."

=== Accolades ===
Thou Wast Mild and Lovely premiered in the U.S. at the Sarasota Film Festival, and internationally at the 2014 Berlin International Film Festival in the Forum section. It has also played at the AFI Fest, the BFI London Film Festival, the Torino Film Festival, the Hong Kong International Film Festival, the Gothenburg Film Festival, the Athens International Film Festival, the Denver Film Festival, the Dallas VideoFest, the Flyway Film Festival, the Sidewalk Film Festival, the Fantasia International Film Festival, the Galway Film Fleadh, the BAMcinemFest and the Imagine Film Festival in the Netherlands.

The film was nominated for the FIPRESCI prize at the Hong Kong International Film Festival, and has won awards on the festival circuit, including the Dallas VideoFest Winner 2014: Best Narrative Feature, Sarasota Film Festival 2014 Winner: Independent Visions Grand Prize & Tangerine Entertainment's Juice Award, Flyway Film Festival 2014: Breakout Filmmaker, Indie Memphis Film Festival 2014: Craig Brewer Emerging Filmmaker Award. It was acquired by Cinelicious Pics in fall of 2014.
