= Butter on the Latch =

- Film poster
- Directed by: Josephine Decker
- Written by: Josephine Decker
- Produced by: Josephine Decker
- Starring: Isolde Chae-Lawrence; Stephan Goldbach; Charlie Hewson; Sarah Small; Yury Yakor
- Cinematography: Ashley Connor
- Release date: May 9, 2013 (Baltimore)
- Running time: 72 minutes
- Country: United States
- Language: English

Butter on the Latch is a 2013 experimental psychological thriller/drama film written, produced, and directed by Josephine Decker. It tells the story of Sarah and Isolde attending a Balkan music camp, the eroding friendship between them, and the budding romance between Sarah and a male camper named Steph.

== Plot ==
Sarah is getting out of a dance performance when she receives a phone call from her friend. The friend tells her that she's woken up in an unfamiliar place with strange people, and she doesn't remember how she got there. Sarah gets upset and repeatedly tells her to try to get out of the house.

Some time later, Sarah heads to a Balkan music camp for a few days. As she walks to the campground, she runs into her friend Isolde, and the two of them are very excited to see each other. While brushing their teeth, they catch up on their lives, especially their recent failed romantic relationships. Isolde tells a story about having sex with her masseur at a seedy massage parlor. They attend some of the music classes and meet a few of the other campers. Isolde finds one guy in particular, Steph, to be very annoying, but Sarah thinks he's cute. That night Sarah dances with Steph, but right when they seem to be forming a connection he abruptly leaves. Sarah finds him outside talking to Isolde. On the way back to their cabin, Sarah asks Isolde if she's alright, and how she managed to get out of that strange house she'd awoken in. Isolde immediately changes the subject and tells a dirty joke.

Sarah runs into Steph again the next day, and together they have lunch and attend a music class. At night, Sarah finds Steph and Isolde pretending to fight each other. Isolde gets drunk, and Sarah offers to walk her back to their cabin. They get lost in the woods, which Isolde blames on Sarah, and Isolde storms off into the woods to look for the cabin on her own. The next day Isolde is distant and dismissive. Sarah continues to spend time with Steph, but when she invites him to her cabin, he declines. That night Sarah dreams of Isolde dancing with a group of women in the woods.

Isolde continues to act distant the next day. Sarah talks to one of the teachers about Bulgarian folk lore, and the woman explains that sometimes things that are normally good can become evil if they are inhabited by an evil spirit. During a large group song outside, Sarah and Steph sneak off into the wilderness. They find a spot near the river and begin to make out and undress. Sarah keeps getting distracted by a noise, but Steph laughs it off and says she's imagining it. She pushes him into the water while they are kissing, and suddenly has a series of quick flashes of visions of her and Isolde. When she comes to, she sees Steph's body lying face-down in the river.

She stumbles back to the cabin, screaming and crying, and walks in on Steph and Isolde having sex. She runs outside, but when she immediately looks in again, Isolde is fast asleep. Isolde comforts her, but soon says she wants to just go back to sleep. Sarah wanders back to the large group song still in progress, and lies down nearby. She soaks in the music and cries.

== Cast ==
- Isolde Chae-Lawrence as Isolde
- Stephan Goldbach as Guy
- Charlie Hewson as Steph
- Sarah Small as Sarah
- Yury Yakor as Guy

== Production ==
The crew consisted of only three people: Decker, Connor, and a sound recordist. Decker had a background in performance art, and Connor's background was in experimental films, so they created a new visual style for the film which synthesized both of these. Most of the acting was improvised, which proved difficult to keep in focus with the shallow depth of field of their DSLR camera, but Connor decided to use the blurriness of the shots intentionally to help tell the story. The film was shot over six days at an actual Balkan folk music camp, with additional pickup shots filmed during post production.

== Release ==
Butter on the Latch premiered at the 2013 Maryland Film Festival, and went on to play at a variety of other festivals including the Nashville Film Festival and the Fantasia International Film Festival. In December 2013, Film Comment magazine included Butter on the Latch in its list of the 20 Best Undistributed films of 2013. Upon seeing the film listed in Film Comment, Cinelicious Pics reached out to Decker about distribution, and in September 2014, they picked up Butter on the Latch for theatrical and VOD distribution along with Decker's 2014 film Thou Wast Mild and Lovely with a November 2014 release. The two films screened in New York for a week starting on November 4, 2014.

== Reception ==
=== Critical response ===
Butter on the Latch received a mostly positive response from critics. It currently hold a 78% positive rating at the review aggregator Rotten Tomatoes.

Jenni Miller of The A.V. Club praised the film, stating "The different techniques Decker uses—the improvised dialogue that feels like listening to one side of a phone conversation, the woozy cinematography and sound design, the disorienting editing—create a sense of claustrophobia. The film’s world is beautiful and scary, but also as intimate as a childhood sleepover." Nicolas Rapold of The New York Times opined that "Butter on the Latch thrives on its casually true snapshots of confusion and connection." Eric Kohn of Indiewire also praised the film, commenting that Decker "...never tries to impose a conventional narrative structure on the proceedings, and the ambiguities develop their own bizarrely compelling rhythm" and that her career is "one to keep an eye on." Peter Debruge of Variety noted that "... Decker has fashioned the kind of feature debut the film industry simply doesn’t support, but would do well to encourage: a visually poetic, virtually free-form groove in which emotion, rather than narrative, guides viewers through a young woman’s visit to a Balkan folk music camp."

Conversely, Leslie Felperin of The Hollywood Reporter described the film as a "pretentious low-budget effort" and added, "With her fitfully charming short Me The Terrible, Decker has shown she knows how to craft a conventional film. It’s clear that her blender-style editing technique and oblique approach to narrative, along with Connor’s blurry, randomly framed cinematography, are artistically motivated decisions which they have every right to make. Some of those decisions, if made with discretion and restraint, might have been quite effective. But slapped altogether like this, the film just looks a mess, apart from some of the rather pretty shots of banana slugs and redwoods."

Richard Brody of The New Yorker later named Butter on the Latch the tenth best film of 2014. Decker's other 2014 film, Thou Wast Mild and Lovely, also made Brody's top ten, coming in second place to Wes Anderson's The Grand Budapest Hotel.
