= Paul Korver =

American actor, filmmaker and producer

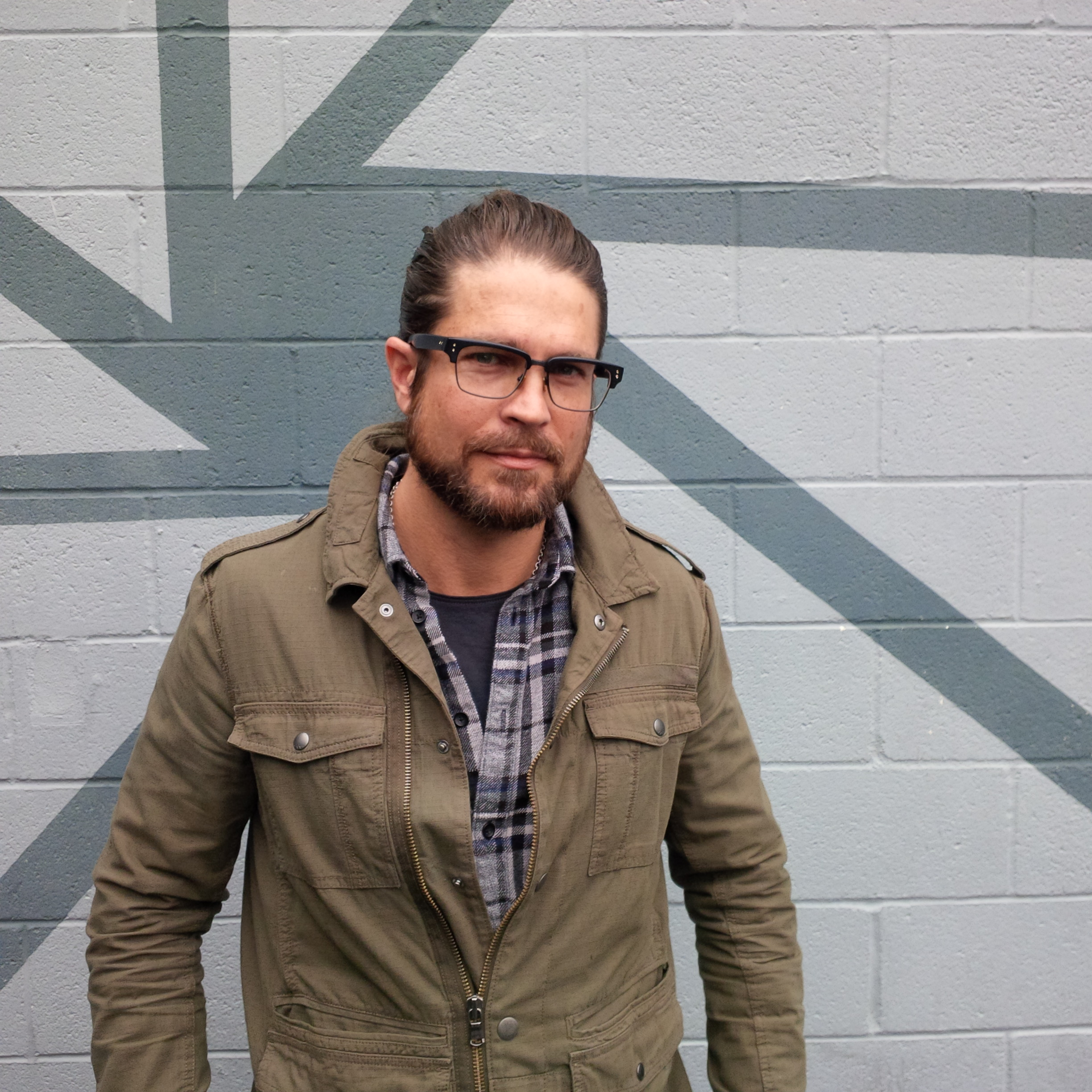
- Korver in 2018
- Born: November 18, 1971 (age 54); Hartville, Ohio, U.S.
- Education: Amador Valley High School
- Alma mater: University of California, Los Angeles
- Occupations: Entrepreneur; Filmmaker; Film restoration
- Years active: 1998–present
- Known for: Hollywood marriage filming; Cinelicious film restoration, including Death Valley Days; founder and CEO of Cinelicious Pics

Paul Korver (born November 18, 1971) is an American entrepreneur, filmmaker, and producer, who currently resides in Los Angeles. After working as an actor in his twenties, in 2002 he turned to cinematography, founding Fifty Foot Films and later Cinelicious.

== Early life ==
Paul Korver was born November 18, 1971, in Hartville, Ohio to Gig and Marilyn Korver. Paul moved to Bellevue, Washington when he was five and moved to Pleasanton, California when he was 12. He graduated from Amador Valley High School and University of California, Los Angeles with a Bachelor of Science degree in 1997.

== Acting career ==
Korver played Officer Peter Roulette in the CHiPs reunion movie in 1998. He played Christopher Hughes II on the long-running soap opera As the World Turns from September 1999 to March 2001, shot in New York. Korver replaced Ben Jorgenson as Christopher Hughes II in 1999. When Korver departed in 2001, Alan White took over his spot as Chris Hughes. Korver played Lieutenant Peyton Styles in the 2001 movie The Painting. Korver played Casey Whitehouse in the Legally Blonde 2003 TV movie. He played Rodger in Dog Gone Love in 2004.

== Fifty Foot Films ==
Founded in 2002 by Korver, Fifty Foot Films is videography company that primarily serves weddings, a move which "many videographers regard as too risky, sensitive, and pricey to be profitable." Fifty Foot Films' name derives from the fact that there are 50 feet of film in a Super 8 film movie cartridge. Korver also later used 16mm and 35mm film to record events.

Fifty Foot Films has recorded marriages including those of Christina Aguilera and Jordan Bratman, Mike Piazza & Alicia Rickter, Jessica Capshaw & Christopher Gavigan, Stephanie March & Bobby Flay, and Mariska Hargitay & Peter Hermann. Korver's first wedding film was for friends Marley Shelton and Beau Flynn. Fifty Foot Films has filmed internationally, including Dubai to Tokyo.

== Cinelicious ==
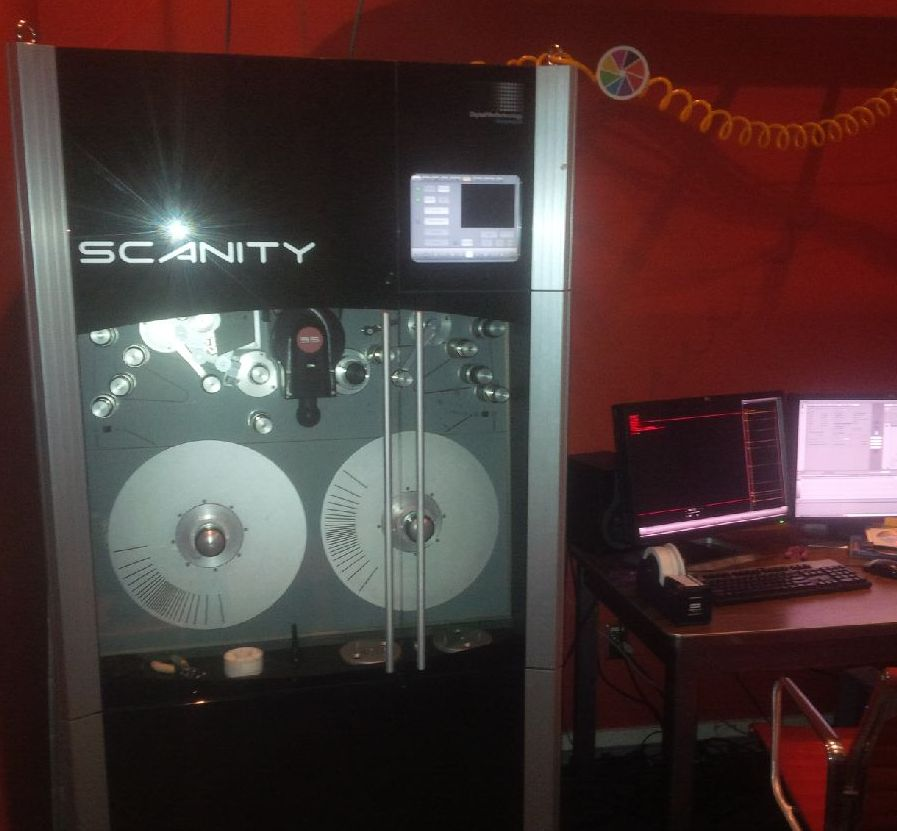
Cinelicious' 4K Scanity in 2016

In 2008 Korver started a Hollywood post-production company Cinelicious. Cinelicious owned and operated a Spirit DataCine for a number of years, before upgrading to a Scanity in 2011. Cinelicious works in a number of formats, like 16mm, Super 8 mm film and 35mm, including 4K resolution film preservation, original film and digital intermediate, commercials, 4K feature film and television shows. At Cinelicious, Korver served as the digital intermediate supervisor on a number of films.

Cinelicious was part of the restoration of the TV series Death Valley Days, restoring 458 half-hour film episodes in 2013 and 2014. The original show was funded by Pacific Coast Borax Company and the restoration is part of the US Borax Film Archives. Cinelicious worked with Rio Tinto Group and US Borax in preserving the TV series. The 16mmm and 35mm Death Valley Days film was scanned at 4k on the Scanity. The Scanity infrared CCD channel was used for dirt mapping to be used downstream with a scratch removal system, PF Clean.

In September 2013 Cinelicious acquired High Hat Post in Santa Monica, California. With this acquisition, High Hat Post no longer needed to outsource the scanning part of their 4K preservation pipeline.

In 2014, with former head programmer of the American Cinematheque, Dennis Bartok, Korver launched a distribution offshoot of Cinelicious called Cinelicious Pics. This is now the distribution wing of the post-production company Cinelicious. A year later, Cinelicious Pics was named "Best Indie Film Distributor" by Los Angeles Magazine.

== See also ==
- History of film
- Studio zone
- Packard Humanities Institute
- UCLA Film and Television Archive
