= Haskell Small =

American musician

- Also known as: Hal Small
- Born: 3 June 1948; Washington, D.C., USA
- Died: 1 June 2024 (aged 75)
- Occupations: composer, pianist, music teacher
- Instrument: piano

Haskell "Hal" Small (3 June 1948 – 1 June 2024), was a composer, pianist, and music teacher in Washington, D.C.

== Musical background ==
After starting college as a science and engineering major, Haskell Small began his musical education at the San Francisco Conservatory of Music and earned a BFA in music from Carnegie-Mellon University in 1972, where he studied piano under Harry Frankin and composition under Roland Leich. Subsequently, he studied composition privately under Vincent Persichetti, and studied piano privately under Theodore Lettvin, Leon Fleisher and William Masselos. Masselos continued as Small's teacher until his death in 1992.

In addition to his mastery of the standard classical repertoire, including works by Beethoven, Scarlatti and Schubert, Small played in rock and roll bands during his college years, and he integrated blues, jazz and other modern and postmodern idioms into his compositions.

== Pianist ==
Small had given concerts in major European capitals, South America, Japan and China, and was hailed for his "dazzlingly prodigious technique" by England's venerable Musical Times in 1976. In the United States he had performed in such venues as Carnegie Hall, the Kennedy Center and the Spoleto Festival. He was featured in the PBS special “A Celebration of the Piano" and on NPR's "All Things Considered" in 1988. In 21st-century seasons, he had played recitals in Japan, Paris and London and participated in the 2007 Festival of American Music in Poland.

Small had recorded an extensive discography, including a George Gershwin disc, a Children's CD with narrator Robert Aubry Davis, and Bach’s Goldberg Variations, in addition to many of his own compositions. He was a champion of 20th century Catalan composer Frederic Mompou and in 2008 released a recording of Mompou's iconoclastic, more than hour-long Música Callada ("Quiet Music").

Haskell Small was a Steinway Artist.

== Composer ==
Small follows in the tradition of 18th- and 19th-century pianist/composers. In addition to music for the piano, he has written works for woodwinds and other instruments, ensembles and the symphony orchestra, as well as choral pieces and music with narration. He has received commissions from such organizations as the Washington Ballet, Three Rivers Piano Competition, Georgetown Symphony and Paul Hill Chorale, and he was the winner of the 1999 Marin Ballet Dance Score Competition. From 2000 to 2003, he was composer-in-residence with the Mount Vernon Orchestra.

In 2005 Small completed "Renoir's Feast," a piano piece commissioned by the Phillips Collection to celebrate the return of Renoir's painting Le Déjeuner des Canotiers (Luncheon of the Boating Party) to the Washington gallery. Small approached the endeavor in a manner reminiscent of Moussorgsky's Pictures at an Exhibition. He studied biographical information on each of Renoir's friends and acquaintances who were pictured in the boating party in order to create a portfolio of musical portraits, then established continuity among them with a recurring theme representing the flowing of the river.

In 2006 Small composed a suite of miniature blues and jazz pieces, "Scraps," for Dutch pianist Marcel Worms's multi-national Blues Project.

In 2007 he was commissioned by pianist Soheil Nasseri to write "Lullaby of War," an emotionally charged series of piano accompaniments and interludes for the recitation of several poems about war from various eras. Although the piece expresses a powerful anti-war sentiment, a preview performance featured readings by a U.S. Air Force general and his wife. Nasseri performed the world premiere of the composition in Carnegie Hall's Weill Recital Hall, and was soon invited to perform it in Berlin, with Small narrating.

"Renoir's Feast" and Small's own orchestral transcription of "Scraps" have been published by PeerMusic.

== Teacher ==
Small was a member of the piano faculty and former Piano Department Chair at the Washington Conservatory of Music, where he had taught since 1984.

== Reviews ==
According to "A Golden 'Silence' From Haskell Small" by Stephen Brookes of the Washington Post, ". . . . [A]s pianist Haskell Small showed in an unusual recital Sunday at the Phillips Collection, Mompou's music is worth attention. ... Much of the credit goes to Small, who may be better known to Phillips audiences for fine performances of his own works." Small has also been praised by other Washington Post reviewers, including Mark Carrington, Sunil Freeman, Joseph McLellan, Tim Page, Cecilia Porter, Joan Reinthaler and Bob Waters, and New York Times writers Bernard Holland, Anna Kisselgoff and Edward Rothstein. Of the premiere of Small's Symphony for Solo Piano (1999), Washington Post reviewer Tim Page wrote, "If a first-time listener was occasionally reminded of other composers (particularly Prokofiev and Messiaen) along the way, the overall impression left by the "Symphony" was decidedly—triumphantly—Small's alone."

He has also received favorable reviews from Die Welt, Der Tagesspiegel, the Washington Times, Music & Vision, Piano and Keyboard Magazine, Fanfare Magazine, 20th Century Music Magazine, Ovation Magazine, the American Record Guide, Records International, The Sioux City Journal, the Montgomery County Gazette and independent reviewer Donald Satz.

== Go ==
Small was a 4-dan Go player (amateur rating scale) and was the leader of the Greater Washington Go Club. Under the auspices of the American Go Association, he organized the first U.S. Go Congress in 1985, an event that continues to be held annually. One of his musical compositions is titled A Game of Go (1987) and was included on the eponymously titled CD released by piano duo Quattro Mani on Klavier Records (2000).

== Family ==
Haskell's wife Betsy Small, born 1947, is a certified yoga instructor, and also a musician (lute, voice, guitar) and a go player. They have two grown daughters, Rachel and Sarah (a photographer, filmmaker and musician, known for singing as part of the New York City-based a cappella Balkan music group Black Sea Hotel).

== Death ==
Haskell died on 1 June 2024 from pancreatic cancer, at the age of 75.
