= The Accompanist (2026 film) =

- Directed by: Zach Woods
- Written by: Zach Woods; Brandon Gardner
- Produced by: Lauren Bratman; Michael Sagol; Allison Hironaka; Carlos Zozaya; Aubrey Plaza
- Starring: Susan Sarandon; Everly Carganilla; Aubrey Plaza; Ilia Volok; John Rothman; Helena Howard; Kevyn Morrow
- Cinematography: Andre Lascaris
- Edited by: Darrin Navarro
- Music by: Gavin Bryars; Yuri Bryars
- Production companies: Caviar; Cinereach; Evil Hag Productions; Lucky Number 8 Productions
- Distributed by: Watermelon Pictures
- Release dates: June 4, 2026 (Tribeca Festival); 2027 (United States)
- Running time: 110 minutes
- Country: United States
- Language: English

The Accompanist is a 2026 American drama film co-written and directed by Zach Woods. It stars Susan Sarandon, Everly Carganilla, Aubrey Plaza, Ilia Volok, John Rothman, Helena Howard, and Kevyn Morrow.

The film premiered at the Tribeca Festival on June 4, 2026.

== Premise ==
70-year-old Sylvia becomes an unlikely foster parent to 8-year-old Emily, removed from her dementia-stricken grandfather's care after a near-fatal incident in New Jersey.

== Cast ==
- Susan Sarandon as Sylvia
- Everly Carganilla as Emily
- Aubrey Plaza as Sarah
- Ilia Volok as Alyosha
- John Rothman as Oscar
- Helena Howard as Wanda
- Kevyn Morrow as Martin Molido

== Production ==
Principal photography began on October 12, 2024, and wrapped on November 17, in New Jersey, on a drama film co-written and directed by Zach Woods. In May 2025, it was reported that Susan Sarandon, Everly Carganilla, Aubrey Plaza, Ilia Volok, John Rothman, Helena Howard, and Kevyn Morrow rounded out the cast.

== Release ==
The Accompanist premiered at the Tribeca Festival on June 4, 2026. In November 2026, Watermelon Pictures acquired distribution rights to the film.
