= First Match =

- Film poster
- Directed by: Olivia Newman
- Written by: Olivia Newman
- Produced by: Chanelle Elaine; Veronica Nickel; Bryan Unkeless
- Starring: Elvire Emmanuelle; Yahya Abdul-Mateen II; Colman Domingo; Jharrel Jerome; Jared Kemp
- Cinematography: Ashley Connor
- Edited by: Tamara Meem
- Music by: Olivier Alary
- Production company: Clubhouse Pictures
- Distributed by: Netflix
- Release dates: March 12, 2018 (South by Southwest); March 30, 2018 (Netflix)
- Running time: 102 minutes
- Country: United States
- Language: English

First Match is a 2018 American drama film written and directed by Olivia Newman, based on her 2010 short film of the same name. The film stars Elvire Emanuelle, Yahya Abdul-Mateen II, Colman Domingo, Jharrel Jerome, and Jared Kemp. The film premiered at the 2018 South by Southwest festival on March 12 where it won the Audience Award and the LUNA/Gamechanger Award. It was then released on Netflix on March 30, 2018.

== Cast ==
- Elvire Emanuelle as Monique
- Yahya Abdul-Mateen II as Darrel, Monique's father
- Colman Domingo as Coach Castile
- Jharrel Jerome as Omari
- Jared Kemp as Malik
- Allen Maldonado as Juan

== Reception ==
On review aggregator website Rotten Tomatoes, the film holds an approval rating of 85%, based on 20 reviews, and an average rating of 7.3/10.
