= Remarkably Bright Creatures (film) =

2026 film by Olivia Newman

- Release poster
- Directed by: Olivia Newman
- Screenplay by: Olivia Newman; John Whittington
- Based on: Remarkably Bright Creatures by Shelby Van Pelt
- Produced by: Bryan Unkeless; Peter Craig; David Levine
- Starring: Sally Field; Lewis Pullman; Joan Chen; Kathy Baker; Beth Grant; Sofia Black-D'Elia; Colm Meaney; Alfred Molina
- Cinematography: Ashley Connor
- Edited by: Tamara Meem
- Music by: Dickon Hinchliffe
- Production companies: Anonymous Content; Night Owl Stories
- Distributed by: Netflix
- Release date: May 8, 2026
- Running time: 111 minutes
- Country: United States
- Language: English

Remarkably Bright Creatures is a 2026 American comedy-drama film directed by Olivia Newman, who co-wrote the script with John Whittington. It is based on the 2022 novel of the same name by Shelby Van Pelt. The film stars Sally Field, Lewis Pullman, Joan Chen, Kathy Baker, Beth Grant, Sofia Black-D'Elia, and Colm Meaney, with Alfred Molina providing the voice of Marcellus the octopus. Its plot follows Tova Sullivan, an elderly janitor, who takes young drifter Cameron under her wing, with their deepening connection being observed and solidified by a giant Pacific octopus.

Remarkably Bright Creatures was released on Netflix on May 8, 2026. The film received positive reviews from critics and earned three Primetime Emmy Award nominations, winning for Outstanding Movie and Outstanding Lead Actress in a Limited or Anthology Series or Movie for Field.

== Plot ==
Tova Sullivan is an elderly widow who works as a somewhat misanthropic night janitor at an aquarium in fictional Sowell Bay, Washington, despite having been encouraged to retire.

After the death of her son Erik years earlier, and more recently, her husband, Tova becomes more withdrawn from her everyday life, including her friend group she dubs the "Knitwits" who spend more time gossiping than knitting. At work, she shares her friends' gossip and develops a friendship of sorts with Marcellus, an elderly but wise octopus who longs to escape from the aquarium.

One day, Marcellus attempts an escape but is discovered by Tova, who finds him by tracking a slippery path on the floor. After attempting to return him to his aquarium, she slips, injuring her ankle and requiring her to take time off to heal.

Around the same time, Cameron Cassmore, an aspiring musician, ends up in town after experiencing motor trouble. Broke, he seeks temporary work to pay for the repairs to the van his recently deceased mother Daphne left him. Cameron is hired to replace Tova at the aquarium while she recuperates. Unable to stay away, she happens upon Cameron at work and chides him for his slacker attitude towards his job. She shows Cameron the value of taking pride in his work and shares her relationship with Marcellus, creating a bond between her and Cameron.

One day, Cameron searches the van and finds that Daphne left behind multiple personal possessions, including a ring left by Cameron's father, whom he does not know, with the letters "EELS" engraved into it, as well as a photo with the name: Simon Brinks. After some difficulty, Cameron finds him, who has since become a successful real estate mogul. Unaware that Cameron expects him to admit paternity, he agrees to meet Cameron.

Simon explains his relationship with Daphne was strictly platonic, as he is gay. He explains that Daphne helped front a heterosexual image for him with peers and his disapproving father while he was in school. Frustrated at the revelation, including news from his former bandmates that they wish to quit their band "Moth Sausage", Cameron arrives at work and angrily hurls the ring into the eels' aquarium. Marcellus witnesses this and later escapes into the tank to retrieve it.

Throughout Tova has flashbacks which often include Erik. Just before he had taken ill, her husband Will had put them on a waiting list for a senior community. As Tova is now alone, she has quietly decided to move there, as they have confirmed a room is available.

Soon after Tova puts her house up for sale, she learns that Marcellus does not have long to live. After seeing him try to escape again, this time to a door facing the docks, she deduces that he wishes to return to the sea to die there. Tova puts Marcellus into a bucket and takes him to the end of the dock, then lowers it to the water's surface so he can crawl out and into the sea.

Looking into the bucket afterwards, Tova finds the ring. Cameron arrives a short time later and she explains to him that "EELS" was her late son Erik's initials. They realise he was Cameron's father, thus making him Tova's grandson and bringing both of them peace at last.

Afterwards, Tova decides not to move into the retirement home and Cameron sells his van, to move in with her. Cleaning Erik's room to move in, he finds a box under the floorboards, which had been untouched since his disappearance. Opening the box, they find pictures of Erik with Daphne and a list of names with "Cameron" circled. This confirms their relationship and his paternity, revealing that Erik actually named Cameron before his passing. In his final line of narration, Marcellus says, "Humans, for the most part, are dull and blundering, but occasionally, you can be remarkably bright creatures."

== Cast ==
- Sally Field as Tova Sullivan, the elderly cleaning lady of a Washington State aquarium
- Lewis Pullman as Cameron Cassmore, a young drifter and member of the band Moth Sausage who gets taken in by Tova
- Joan Chen as Janice Kim, a member of Tova's knitting club called the Knit-Wits
- Kathy Baker as Mary Ann Minetti, a member of the Knit-Wits
- Beth Grant as Barb Vanderhoof, a member of the Knit-Wits
- Sofia Black-D'Elia as Avery, the proprietor of a surf and paddle shop
- Colm Meaney as Ethan Mack, the proprietor of a Shop-Way grocery store in Sowell Bay
- Alfred Molina as the voice of Marcellus, a giant Pacific octopus who narrates the film

== Production ==
Netflix announced in August 2024 that they would be adapting Shelby Van Pelt's novel Remarkably Bright Creatures (2022). Olivia Newman had been hired to direct and co-write the screenplay with John Whittington, and Sally Field cast in the lead role as Tova. Additional literary material was written by Katie Silberman. In March 2025, Lewis Pullman, Colm Meaney, Joan Chen, Kathy Baker, Beth Grant, Sofia Black-D'Elia, and Laura Harris joined the cast. By May 2025, principal photography had wrapped in Vancouver, Canada, with Ashley Connor serving as the cinematographer.

Marcellus, the octopus who lives in Tova's aquarium, is depicted through a mixture of captured footage and computer-generated imagery (CGI). The production team filmed hours of footage of Agnetha, a giant Pacific octopus living in the Vancouver Aquarium, and used that footage wherever possible, while the visual effects team created a CGI double of Agnetha for scenes that required specific movements and placement. Alfred Molina voiced Marcellus.

== Release ==
Remarkably Bright Creatures was released on Netflix on May 8, 2026.

== Reception ==
=== Critical response ===
On the review aggregator website Rotten Tomatoes, 86% of 77 critics' reviews are positive, with an average rating of 6.9/10. The website's consensus reads: "Grounded by a characteristically wonderful Sally Field, Remarkably Bright Creatures is a sweet melodrama that tugs the heartstrings with admirable restraint." Metacritic, which uses a weighted average, assigned the film a score of 55 out of 100, based on 20 critics, indicating "mixed or average" reviews.

=== Accolades ===
Award	Date of ceremony	Category	Nominee(s)	Result	Ref.
Astra TV Awards	August 15, 2026	Best TV Movie	Remarkably Bright Creatures	Won	
Astra TV Awards	August 15, 2026	Best Actor in a Limited Series or TV Movie	Lewis Pullman	Nominated	
Astra TV Awards	August 15, 2026	Best Actress in a Limited Series or TV Movie	Sally Field	Won	
Astra TV Awards	August 15, 2026	Best Directing in a Limited Series or TV Movie	Olivia Newman	Nominated	
Astra TV Awards	August 15, 2026	Best Writing in a Limited Series or TV Movie	Olivia Newman and John Whittington	Nominated	
Gotham TV Awards	June 1, 2026	Outstanding Original Film, Broadcast or Streaming	Olivia Newman, Peter Craig, David Levine, and Bryan Unkeless	Nominated	
Gotham TV Awards	June 1, 2026	Outstanding Performance in an Original Film	Sally Field	Nominated	
Primetime Emmy Awards	September 14, 2026	Outstanding Lead Actress in a Limited or Anthology Series or Movie	Sally Field	Won	
Primetime Creative Arts Emmy Awards	September 6, 2026	Outstanding Movie	Alyssa Rodrigues, Erika Hampson, Olivia Newman, Shelby Van Pelt, Tony Lipp, Alisa Tager, Bryan Unkeless, Peter Craig, and David Levine	Won	
Primetime Creative Arts Emmy Awards	September 6, 2026	Outstanding Contemporary Costumes for a Limited or Anthology Series or Movie	Carla Hetland, Margaret Schliessler, and Laura Zydervelt	Nominated	
