= Kevyn Morrow =

American actor

- Morrow in 2026
- Born: Omaha, Nebraska, U.S.
- Other name: Kevin Morrow
- Occupations: Actor, singer, choreographer
- Years active: 1983–present

Kevyn Morrow is an American actor, singer, and choreographer known for his roles on Broadway.

== Early life ==
Morrow is a native of Omaha, Nebraska. He graduated from Omaha Northwest High School in 1978.

== Career ==
=== Broadway, Off-Broadway and Tours ===
Morrow made his Broadway debut as a member of the original cast of Leader of the Pack, which also featured Broadway star Annie Golden. He soon joined the cast of A Chorus Line and was a member of the show's 1990 closing cast. His next Broadway show would be as an original cast member of another Michael Bennett hit, Dreamgirls. He played various roles in the cast throughout its run both on Broadway, on tour, and in its 1987 revival, but most notably the role of C.C. White, for which he received critical acclaim.

Following Dreamgirls, Morrow appeared on Broadway in Smokey Joe's Cafe, Dream, The Scarlet Pimpernel, the 2002 revival of Anything Goes, the 2015 revival of The Color Purple, Bandstand, Moulin Rouge!, the 2024 revival of Our Town, and Floyd Collins.

Off-Broadway he appeared in the original production of The Bubbly Black Girl Sheds Her Chameleon Skin, which also featured Tony-winner La Chanze, and Blue, where he played the title character of Blue Williams. He recently appeared in the premiere presentation of Ripper the musical, directed by Stephen Amato at New World Stages. In 2014, Morrow appeared in the Primary Stages production of While I Yet Live as Vernon.

From October 2021 to 2022, Morrow starred as the titular Hades in the first US national tour of Hadestown. He joined the cast of the tour of Moulin Rouge! in 2023 and rejoined the cast in January 2026 as Toulouse-Lautrec.

=== London ===
In 2002 he made his West End debut in Rob Bettinson and Alan Janes' 125th Street at the Shaftesbury Theatre. Following that production, Morrow starred in the London premiere of Ragtime, directed by Stafford Arima at the Piccadilly Theatre, as Coalhouse Walker Jr., a performance for which he was nominated for the Olivier Award for Best Actor in a Musical.

=== Regional ===
He has appeared in numerous productions throughout the United States, but most notably for Once on This Island at the Bay Street Theatre (the production was filmed for the Lincoln Center Archives), Ragtime in Omaha, Nebraska (where he won the award for Best Performance by a Visiting Actor), Tambourines to Glory in Washington D.C. (where he was nominated for the Helen Hayes Award), the role of Curtis Taylor in Dreamgirls, and the role of Billy Strayhorn in the national touring company of Stormy Weather, starring Leslie Uggams as Lena Horne, including at the Prince Music Theatre in Philadelphia.

=== Other ===
Morrow's television appearances include a recurring role on One Life to Live (appearing in June) as well as appearances on Law & Order, Hope and Faith, Coach, Murphy Brown, Ed, and many others. He has appeared in multiple films, including the 1983 John Travolta film Staying Alive and in 2002 film Barbershop as monk.

Morrow is a member of the Broadway show choir and occasionally works as a choreographer regionally.

== Filmography ==
=== Film ===
| Year | Title | Role | Notes |
|---|---|---|---|
| 1983 | Staying Alive | 11-year-old Dancer | |
| 1997 | Hoodlum | Waldo / Church Conductor | |
| 1999 | Light It Up | Boy (Gangbanger) | |
| 2002 | Barbershop | Monk | |
| 2018 | BANDSTAND: The Broadway Musical on Screen | Al / James Haupt | |
| 2019 | Fair Market Value | Noah | |
| 2020 | Estella Scrooge: A Christmas Carol with a Twist | Jasper Jaggers | |
| 2026 | The Accompanist | Martin Molido | |

=== Television ===
| Year | Title | Role | Notes |
|---|---|---|---|
| 1991 | Coach | Airline Clerk | Episode: "The Marion Kind: Part 2" |
| 2001 | Ed | Mr. Gordon | Episode: "Goodbye Sadie" |
| 2005 | Hope & Faith | Director | 3 episodes |
| 2007 | One Life to Live | Private investigator | Episode #1.9945 |
| 2009 | Law & Order | Adam Owens | Episode: "Fed" |
| 2011 | Onion News Network | Dr. Statsky | Episode: "The Trial of TR-425" |
| 2012 | The Good Wife | Mr. Martin | Episode: "Waiting for the Knock" |
| 2013 | Person of Interest | IAB Detective Ed Solis | Episode: "Zero Day" |
| 2013, 2015 | Elementary | Detective Bailey | 2 episodes |
| 2017 | Blue Bloods | Glenn Knapp | Episode: "Lost Souls" |
| 2018 | The Path | Pastor Billy | 4 episodes |
| 2019 | When They See Us | Warren | Episode: "Part Four" |
| 2019 | Instinct | Al | Episode: "Manhunt" |
| 2021 | Law & Order: Special Victims Unit | Chaplain Al-Khabeer | Episode: "Welcome to the Pedo Motel" |
| 2021 | Colin in Black & White | Herc's Father | Episode: "Cornrows" |
| 2022 | 9-1-1 | Junior Franklin | 2 episodes |
| 2023 | East New York | Aldolphus Bentley | Episode: "By the Book" |
| 2023 | FBI: Most Wanted | Papa 'B' (Barnes) | Episode: "Double Fault" |
| 2024, 2026 | Law & Order | Judge Marty Chen | 3 episodes |

=== Video games ===
| Year | Title | Role |
|---|---|---|
| 1998 | MechCommander | Extra 4 |
| 2013 | Grand Theft Auto Online | Entry Pilot |
| 2018 | Red Dead Redemption 2 | The Local Pedestrian Population |
