= Cinelicious Pics =

American film distributor

- Company type: Private
- Industry: Film distributor
- Headquarters: Los Angeles, California
- Key people: Paul Korver (founder and CEO)
- Products: Motion pictures
- Parent: Cinelicious
- Website: https://www.cineliciouspics.com

Cinelicious Pics is a distribution wing of the post-production company Cinelicious, launched by Paul Korver and Dennis Bartok, former American Cinematheque head programmer.

The company was designed to distribute new U.S. and foreign independent features and documentaries.

In November 2014, the company announced it would release Eiichi Yamamoto's cult-classic Kanashimi no Belladonna (Belladonna of Sadness) as its first restoration and re-release, with restoration work completed in-house.

LA Weekly announced Cinelicious Pics as Best Indie Film Distributor of 2015.

In 2017, Arbelos Films began servicing its film library.

== Releases ==
- Dark Night, 2016 -Directed by Tim Sutton
- Giuseppe Makes a Movie – directed by Adam Rifkin (U.S. 2014)
- Thou Wast Mild and Lovely – directed by Josephine Decker (U.S. 2014)
- Butter on the Latch – directed by Josephine Decker (U.S. 2014)
- Gangs of Wasseypur – directed by Anurag Kashyap (India 2013)
- Elektro Moskva – directed by Elena Tikhonova and Dominik Spritzendorfer (Austria 2013)
- Metalhead – directed by Ragnar Bragason (Iceland 2013)
- The Mend – directed by John Magary
- Jane B. par Agnès V. – directed by Agnès Varda (France, 1988)
- Kung Fu Master – directed by Agnès Varda (France, 1988)
- Kanashimi no Belladonna (Belladonna of Sadness) – directed by Eiichi Yamamoto (Japan, 1973)
- Bara no Sōretsu (Funeral Parade of Roses) – directed by Toshio Matsumoto (Japan, 1969)
- Private Property – directed by Leslie Stevens (U.S. 1960)
