= Goodnight Universe =

2025 video game

- Developer: Nice Dream
- Publisher: Skybound Games
- Directors: Graham Parkes; Oliver Lewin
- Producer: Oliver Lewin
- Designer: Bela Messex
- Programmers: Bela Messex; Kenny Park
- Artist: Daniel Beaulieu
- Writer: Graham Parkes
- Composers: Oliver Lewin; Dillon Terry
- Engine: Unity
- Platforms: Nintendo Switch 2; PlayStation 5; Windows; Xbox Series X/S; Nintendo Switch
- Release: Switch 2, PS5, Win, XSX/S; November 11, 2025; Switch; December 18, 2025
- Genre: Adventure
- Mode: Single-player

Goodnight Universe is an adventure video game developed by Nice Dream and published by Skybound Games. Players control a 6-month-old baby named Isaac, voiced by Lewis Pullman, who is discovering he has psychic powers. The game was released for Nintendo Switch 2, PlayStation 5, Windows, and Xbox Series X/S on November 11, 2025, and for Nintendo Switch on December 18, 2025.

== Gameplay ==
The player controlling Isaac's abilities.

Goodnight Universe is a first-person adventure game. The player controls 6-month-old Isaac as he discovers his psychic abilities. Just like Before Your Eyes, the game Nice Dream founders worked on while at GoodbyeWorld Games, the game features optional eye-tracking using the player's camera to interact with the game, but instead of blinking to progress, Goodnight Universe allows the player to move and manipulate objects with their eyes and head, as well as using facial expressions to make in-game choices.

== Development and release ==
The game was made by American developer Nice Dream, a studio that was formed by Graham Parkes and Oliver Lewin, who worked on Before Your Eyes. The main character, Isaac, is voiced by actor Lewis Pullman and other cast members consist of Kerri Kenney-Silver, Al Madrigal, Tessa Espinola, Timothy Simons, and Sarah Burns. The game was announced in April 2024 and was released for Nintendo Switch 2, PlayStation 5, Windows, and Xbox Series X/S on November 11, 2025, followed by a Nintendo Switch version on December 18, 2025.

== Reception ==
=== Critical reception ===
Reception

Aggregate scores
Aggregator	Score
Metacritic	(PC) 83/100 (PS5) 83/100 (NS2) 80/100
OpenCritic	94% recommend

Review scores
Publication	Score
Game Informer	8/10
Gamekult	8/10
GameSpot	9/10

Goodnight Universe was received "generally favorable" by critics, according to review aggregator website Metacritic. OpenCritic determined that 94% of critics recommended the game.

Game Informer's Eric Van Allen praised the game's story, voice acting, and use of camera, but noted some small detection issues with the camera in relation to the emotion mechanic. Gamekult's Kelmazad enjoyed the plot, tone, dialogue, and use of the camera, but mentioned that since the camera function is completely optional, the experience could be lessened by those who don't use the feature. GameSpot's Mark Delaney lauded the game's story, characters, soundtrack, and creative use of the camera, but noted a few moments of the game's pacing being weighed down by frustrating areas.
