= Shelby Van Pelt =

American author

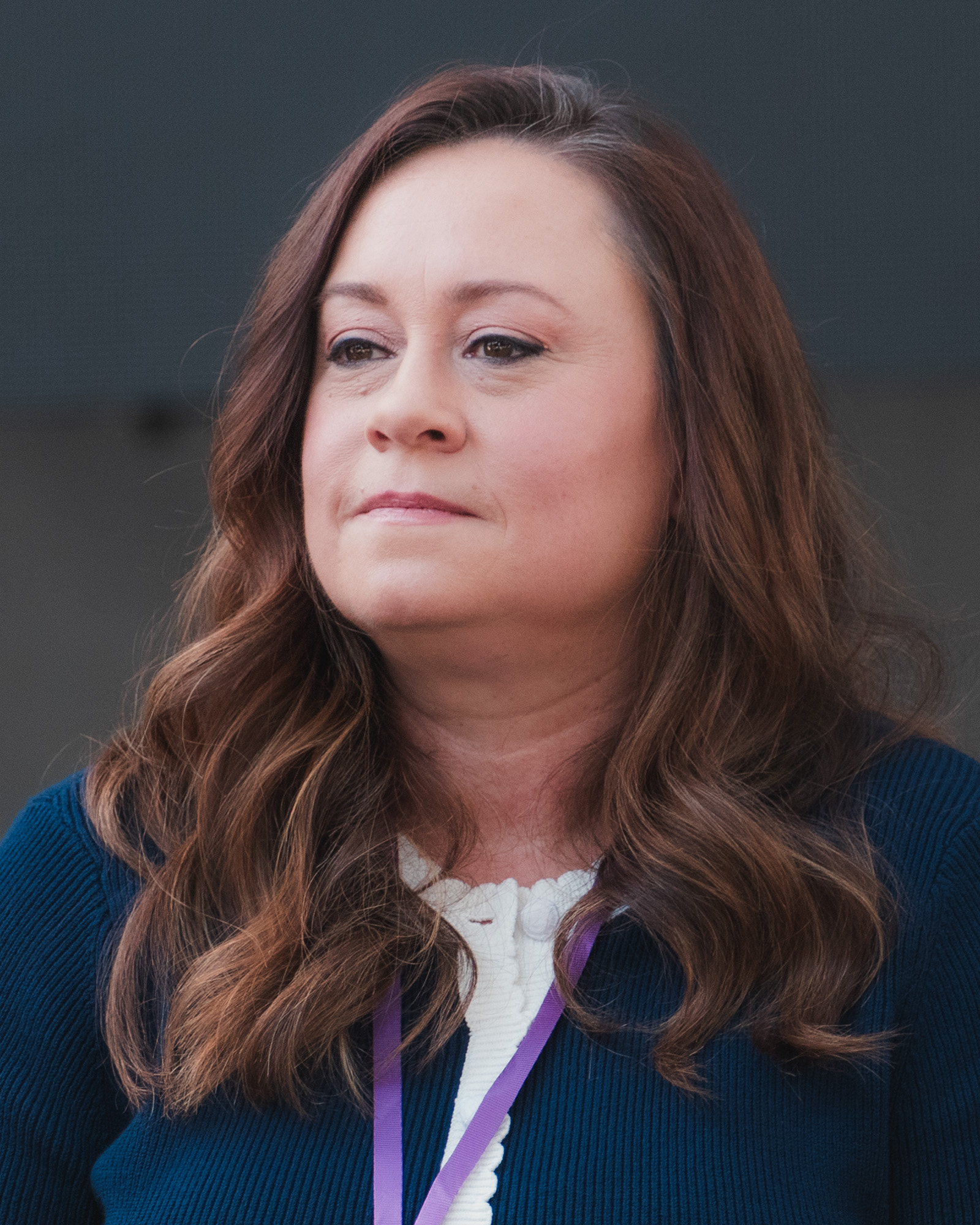
Van Pelt in 2026

Shelby Van Pelt is an American writer. Her debut novel Remarkably Bright Creatures (2022) has sold over 4 million copies and was adapted into a 2026 film. She grew up in Tacoma, Washington, graduated from Claremont McKenna College in 2002, and spent the next several years working as a financial consultant on litigation. After graduation, Van Pelt spent several years living in Atlanta, where she began writing Remarkably Bright Creatures in 2013. The novel was primarily written in 2020, during the COVID-19 pandemic.

== Biography ==
Shelby Van Pelt was born in 1980 or 1981. She grew up in Tacoma, Washington. She attended Stadium High School where she ran cross country and track and she worked as the co-editor of the school newspaper, Stadium World. Van Pelt attended Claremont McKenna College, where she studied philosophy, politics and economics and graduated cum laude in 2002.

After college, she worked as a financial consultant on litigation and at some point sold running shoes. Van Pelt told the Chicago Tribune that she mailed a number of stories to journals or submitted them to contests, but was generally rejected.

She began working on a novel while living in Atlanta, when she was taking a course on writing fiction in 2013 at Emory University and was assigned to write a story from an "unusual perspective". Most of the novel was written in 2020, during the COVID-19 pandemic. It was published as Remarkably Bright Creatures in 2022.

The novel has sold over 4 million copies and has appeared on the New York Times hardcover fiction best-seller list multiple times. She was awarded the 2023 McLaughlin-Esstman-Stearns First Novel Prize and $3000 by the Writer's Center for Remarkably Bright Creatures. The book was also adapted as a film, released in 2026. Van Pelt was involved in its production and was an extra in the movie.

== Personal life ==
As of 2026, Van Pelt lived in Chicago with her husband, whom she met at Claremont McKenna, and their two kids. She enjoys running, and competed in the 2013 Boston Marathon.

== Awards and honors ==
- 2023 McLaughlin-Esstman-Stearns First Novel Prize

== Published works ==
- Remarkably Bright Creatures (2022)
- Hope: An Anthology of Hopeful Stories and Poetry - various
