= Josephine Decker =

American filmmaker

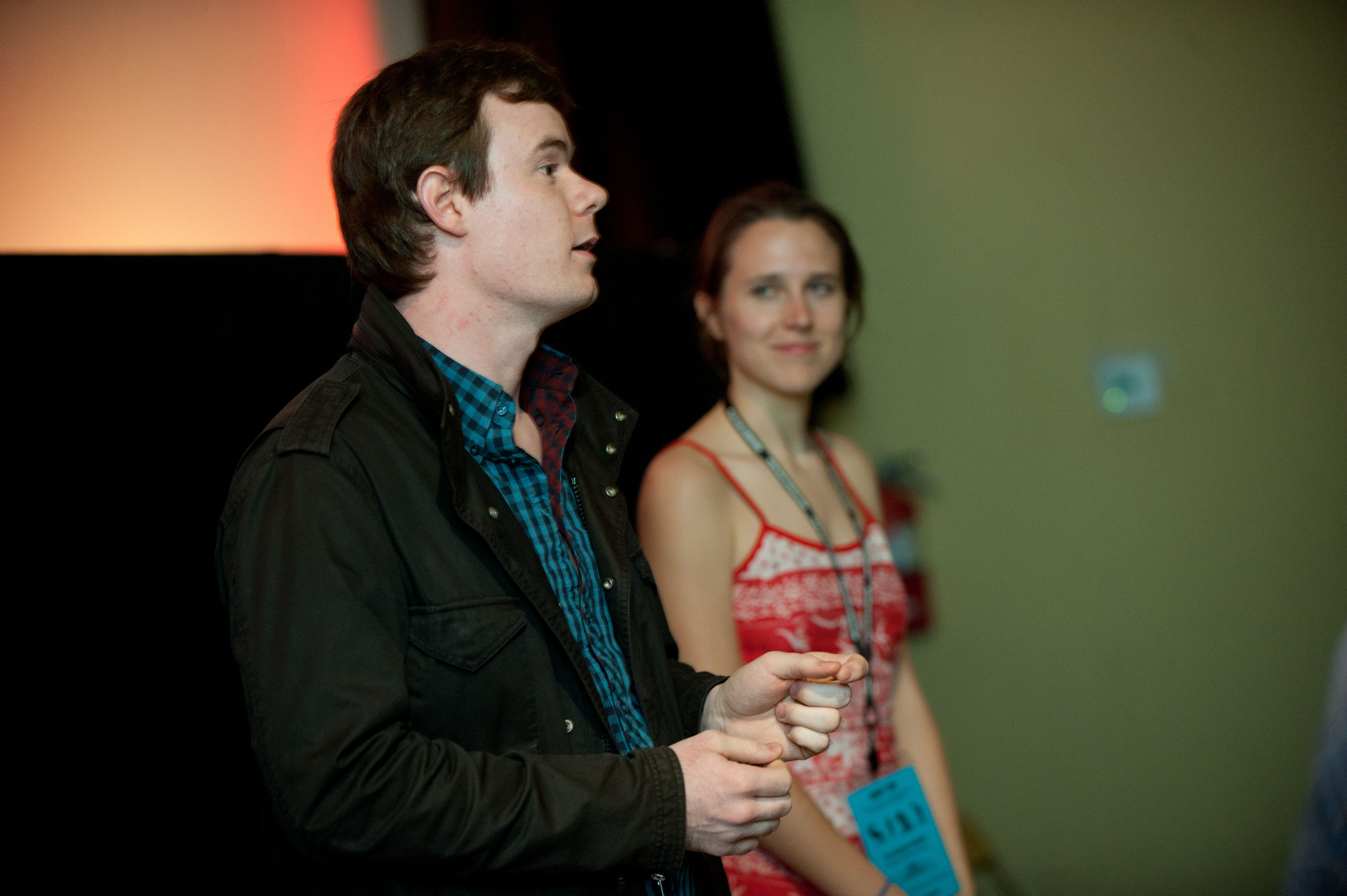
- Joe Swanberg and Josephine Decker - 2011
- Born: April 2, 1981 (age 45); London, UK
- Education: Princeton University
- Occupations: Filmmaker; performance artist
- Years active: 2005–present

Josephine Decker (born April 2, 1981) is an English–born American filmmaker. Films she has directed include Butter on the Latch (2013), Thou Wast Mild and Lovely (2014), Madeline's Madeline (2018), Shirley (2020), The Sky is Everywhere (2022), and Chasing Summer (2026). She also co-directed the documentary Bi the Way (2008) with Brittany Blockman.

== Early life ==
Decker was born in London and raised in Texas. As a child, she played the piano and dreamed of being a writer, as well as a photographer for National Geographic. She graduated from Highland Park High School in 1999 and Princeton University in 2003, where she aspired to become a conductor and applied for a conducting class. She was inspired to become a filmmaker after watching Monsters, Inc.

== Career ==
Decker produced and directed her first short film, Naked Princeton, in 2005.

In 2008, Decker and Brittany Blockman co-directed the documentary Bi the Way, which focuses on bisexuality in the United States. Despite being described by Variety's Joe Leydon as a "once-over-lightly examination of an alleged cultural phenomenon", the film won the Alternative Spirit Grand Prize at the Rhode Island International Film Festival.

Decker wrote and directed her second short film, Where Are You Going, Elena?, in 2009. In 2012, she wrote and directed the short film Me the Terrible, which Richard Brody of The New Yorker called a "wondrous short film".

In May 2010, Decker attended the last day of Marina Abramović's retrospective The Artist Is Present at MoMA. As she sat down across from Abramovic, Decker immediately disrobed and stood naked in the middle of the museum until seven security guards escorted her out over the museum's no-nudity policy. Decker declared that her goal was to be "as vulnerable to [Abramovic] as she constantly makes herself to us."

In 2013, Decker wrote, produced, and directed her first feature film, the experimental psychological thriller Butter on the Latch. Eric Kohn of Indiewire wrote that Decker's career was "one to keep an eye on" and Peter Debruge of Variety wrote, "Decker has fashioned the kind of feature debut the film industry simply doesn't support, but would do well to encourage: a visually poetic, virtually free-form groove in which emotion, rather than narrative, guides viewers through a young woman's visit to a Balkan folk music camp." Decker was included in Filmmaker Magazine's 2013 list of 25 New Faces in Independent Film.

In early 2014, she completed her second theatrical film, the experimental erotic thriller Thou Wast Mild and Lovely, starring Sophie Traub and Decker's frequent collaborator Joe Swanberg. To raise money for the film's post-production, Decker ran a crowdfunding campaign on Kickstarter with a goal of $15,500. The campaign closed on August 22, 2013, having raised $18,517. In his review, Kohn gave the film a B+, writing, "Its labyrinthine characteristics suggest the unholy marriage of Ingmar Bergman and David Lynch. While nowhere near the same level of refinement as those giants, Decker concocts a wholly enveloping vision of isolation told with a grimly poetic style that wanders all over the place but never stops playing by its own eerie rulebook."

In September, 2014, it was announced that Butter on the Latch and Thou Wast Mild and Lovely had been picked up for a theatrical and VOD distribution by Cinelicious Pics with a planned release set for November, 2014.

Decker has also appeared as an actor in many independent films, including Joe Swanberg's Uncle Kent, Onur Tukel's Richard's Wedding, Saturday Morning Mystery, the romantic tragedy Loves Her Gun, and Stephen Cone's Black Box.

In November 2015, Decker served on the jury of the 33rd Torino Film Festival. The festival had paid tribute to her work in the Onde section in 2014.

Decker co-directed with Zefrey Throwell the 2017 documentary Flames. As Deadline put it, "Shot over the course of five years, the project charts the immensely passionate and profound relationship between the two artists, watching the spectacular romance, excitement and adventure of their relationship at its peak, and the fallout as Decker and Throwell clash, falling out of love with each other."

Decker’s third feature film, Madeline's Madeline, screened at the Sundance and Berlin film festivals in early 2018. It features Molly Parker and Miranda July, and introduces 19-year-old Helena Howard as a troubled acting student whose "class exercises become increasingly immersive and personal".

In 2020, Neon distributed Decker's feature Shirley, inspired by the life of author Shirley Jackson. The film starred Elisabeth Moss and Michael Stuhlbarg, and was produced by Christine Vachon and executive produced by Martin Scorsese. On RogerEbert.com, critic Sheila O'Malley called it Decker's "most ambitious film to date."

In a change of pace, Decker directed the coming-of-age drama The Sky is Everywhere, released in 2022 by Apple+ and A24. In an interview, Decker said, "I think I was really ready to make something that was a little lighter and had more lightness and less gritty, dark, violent, sexual. Probably for my next movie, I'll go back into it hard, but this was a nice little respite."

Decker's millennial coming-of-age narrative feature Chasing Summer, written by and starring Iliza Shlesinger, premiered at the 2026 Sundance Film Festival.

== Influences ==
Decker cites Antichrist, Days of Heaven, Eternal Sunshine of the Spotless Mind, and Silent Light as her primary influences, as well as the novel East of Eden, director Joe Swanberg, and frequent collaborator Sarah Small. She cited Black Swan as a particular influence on Butter on the Latch.

== Personal life ==
Decker grew up as a Christian, and is now a Buddhist, having practiced the religion since at least 2011.

== Filmography ==
Year	Film	Director	Producer	Writer	Actor	Role	Notes
2005	Naked Princeton	Yes	Yes				Short film
2008	Bi the Way	Yes					Documentary; co-directed with Brittany Blockman
2009	Where Are You Going, Elena?	Yes		Yes			Short film
2010	Squeezebox	Yes					Documentary short
2011	Uncle Kent				Yes	Josephine	
2011	Autoerotic				Yes		
2011	Art History			Yes	Yes	Juliette	
2012	Me the Terrible	Yes		Yes			Short film
2012	Saturday Morning Mystery				Yes	Gwen	
2012	Richard's Wedding				Yes	Phoebe	
2013	Black Box				Yes	Holly	
2013	Loves Her Gun				Yes	Charlotte	
2013	Butter on the Latch	Yes	Yes	Yes			
2014	Thou Wast Mild and Lovely	Yes		Yes			
2015	Rosehill				Yes	Alice	
2017	Flames	Yes		Yes	Yes	Herself	co-directed with Zefrey Throwell
2018	Madeline's Madeline	Yes		Yes			
2020	Shirley	Yes					
2020	Once Upon a River				Yes	Joanna Murray	
2022	The Sky Is Everywhere	Yes	Yes				
2026	Chasing Summer	Yes					

=== Television ===
Year	Title	Role	Notes
2018	Room 104	Director, writer, and actor	Season 2, episode 7, "The Man and the Baby and the Man"
2020	Dare Me	Director	Season 1, episode 6, "Code Red"
