= Bi the Way =

- Directed by: Brittany Blockman; Josephine Decker
- Written by: Brittany Blockman; Josephine Decker
- Produced by: Michael Huffington; Martha Shane
- Cinematography: Nils Benson; Brittany Blockman; Josephine Decker; Wilmot Kidd
- Edited by: Brittany Blockman; Josephine Decker
- Music by: Daniel Raimi
- Release date: 2008
- Running time: 85 mins
- Country: United States
- Language: English

Bi the Way is a 2008 documentary film about bisexuality in the United States. It had its world premiere at the SXSW Film Festival in Austin, Texas. The film has aired at film festivals throughout the United States, Canada, the United Kingdom, Portugal, Turkey, Greece, Australia, Brazil, and Taiwan, including at Silverdocs Film Festival, Outfest, Newfest, !f Istanbul, and Rio de Janeiro Film Festival. It was aired on the Logo Network in summer 2009.

The film follows the lives of several young bisexuals in the United States. Its makers, Brittany Blockman and Josephine Decker, also appear on camera to frame the stories.

== Synopsis ==
The film is structured around a roadtrip, during which the creators introduce five young Americans confronting issues relating to bisexuality. Former cheerleader Pam, from Memphis, Tennessee, navigates between the tolerance and sexual openness of her friendship group and the conservatism of her southern Catholic family. Black hip-hop dancer Tahj, enjoying little success with girls, forms a relationship with a man he meets on MySpace and must weigh the rejection of his community against his newfound love. 28-year-old Taryn is contemplating marriage to her boyfriend but also embarks on a new romance with a woman, testing the limits of monogamy and the boundaries of gender roles. David, 24, defies the expectations of his parents and ex-girlfriends to assert his bisexuality, while seeking to reconcile his traditional values with his open-minded views. Lastly, in San Antonio, Texas, Josh, 11, fears his gay father will reject him if he pursues his growing interest in girls.

The film interlaces these stories with commentary from evolutionary biologists, psychologists, and anthropologists to discuss themes of sexual ambiguity.

== Awards ==
- 2008: The film won the Alternative Spirit Grand Prize at the Rhode Island International Film Festival.
