= Zach Woods =

American actor (born 1984)

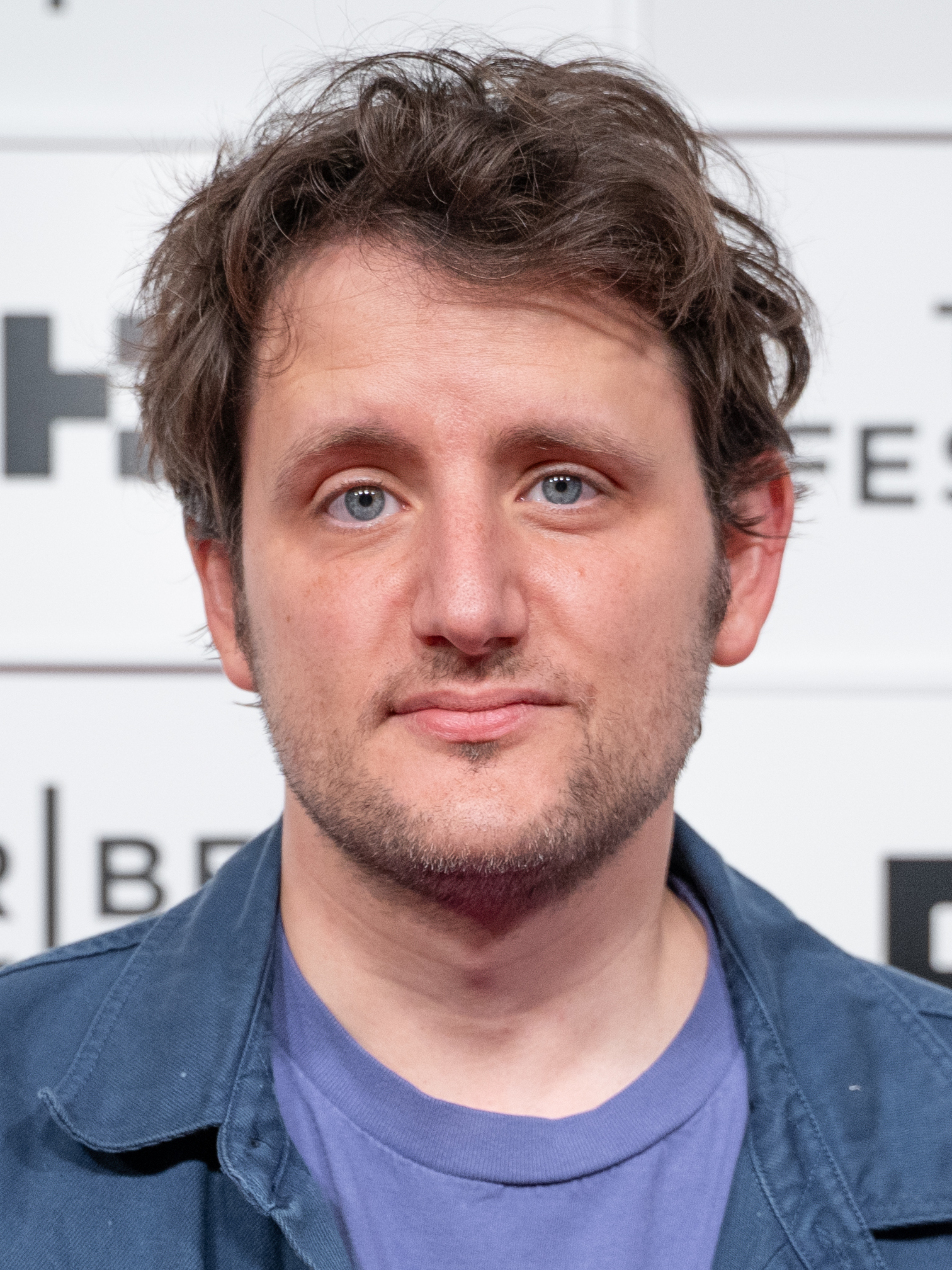
- Woods in 2026
- Born: September 25, 1984 (age 42); Trenton, New Jersey, U.S.
- Education: New York University (BA)
- Occupations: Actor; comedian; writer; producer; director
- Years active: 2004–present
- Television: The Office; Silicon Valley; Avenue 5; Playing House

Zach Woods (born September 25, 1984) is an American actor, comedian, writer, producer, and director. He is best known for his roles as a series regular for three seasons as Gabe Lewis on the NBC sitcom The Office, as Jared Dunn on the HBO comedy series Silicon Valley, as Zach Harper on the USA Network sitcom Playing House, and as Matt Spencer on the HBO comedy show Avenue 5. He also recurred on the HBO series Veep as Ed Webster, and starred as billionaire Edgar D. Minnows in the Apple TV+ murder mystery series The Afterparty.

== Early life ==
Woods was born in Trenton, New Jersey. He is Jewish. The family surname had originally been Widensky. His father, Jonathan, is a psychiatrist who specializes in clinical therapy, and his mother, Lisa, is a nurse practitioner. Woods is a middle child; he has an older brother and younger sister. In 1997 and 1998, he attended summer camp at Interlochen Center for the Arts. He grew up in Yardley, Pennsylvania, and graduated from Pennsbury High School in 2003. He graduated with a Bachelor of Arts degree from the Gallatin School of Individualized Study at New York University.

== Career ==
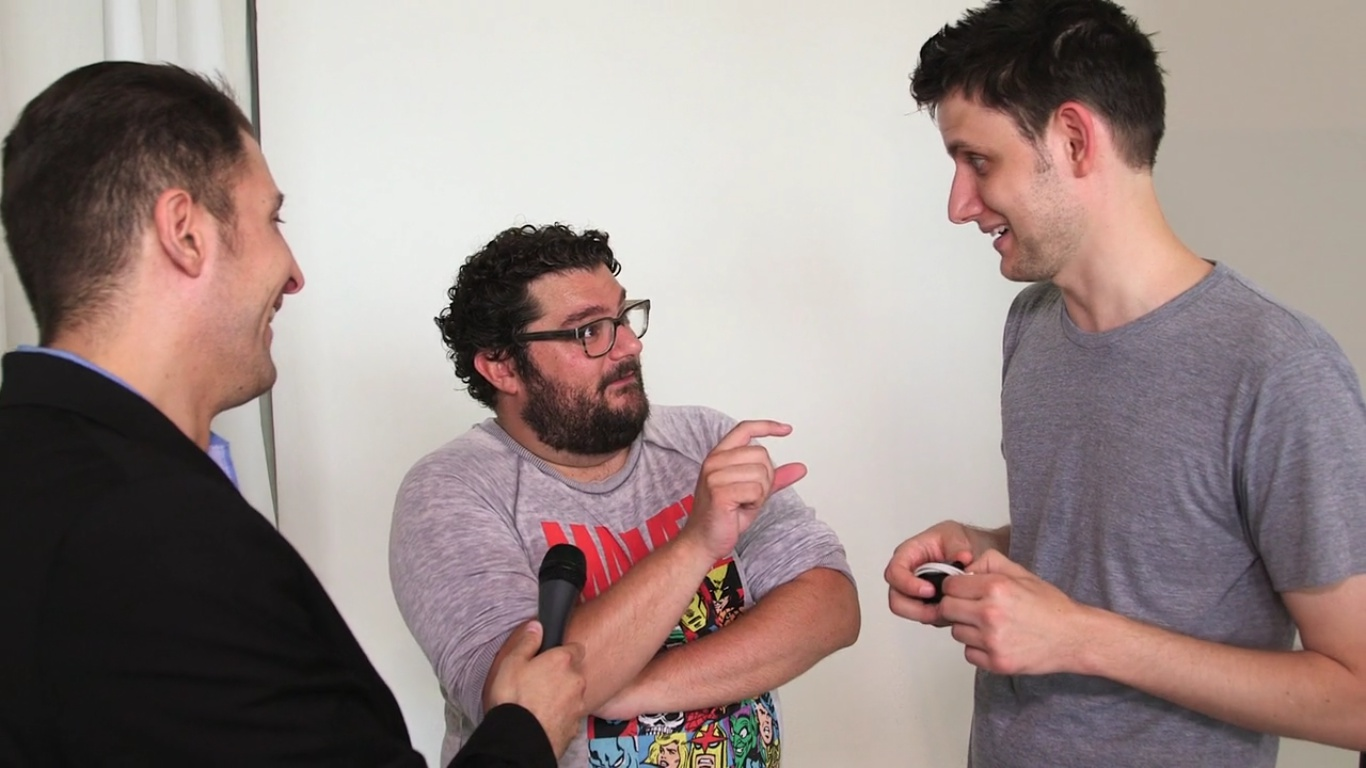
Woods with Bobby Moynihan in 2015

Woods started performing improv at the Upright Citizens Brigade Theatre at age 16 and was a part of the improvisational sketch troupe "The Stepfathers", whose members included Bobby Moynihan and Chris Gethard. He has taught improv at Columbia University, Duke University, and Lincoln Center. He has appeared in films such as In the Loop (2009) and The Other Guys (2010), and in the CollegeHumor skits "Adam and Eve in the Friend Zone" and "The Infinisphereb".

He is known for starring as Awkward Boy, the protagonist in the YouTube video series The Most Awkward Boy in the World. In 2010, he appeared as a zombie in a Starburst candy commercial.

Starting in 2010, he portrayed Gabe Lewis on the NBC sitcom The Office. He was promoted to series regular beginning in season 7.

Woods has had roles in a number of HBO shows. From 2014 to 2019, he co-starred as Jared on Silicon Valley. He also had a recurring role on Veep as Ed Webster. Woods had a role in the action comedy film Spy (2015), directed by Paul Feig, and appeared in Feig's film Ghostbusters in 2016. Beginning in January 2020, he had a role on the science fiction comedy TV series Avenue 5 as Matt Spencer, Head of Customer Relations.

He made his film directorial debut with the 2026 drama film The Accompanist starring Susan Sarandon and Aubrey Plaza, which he also co-wrote. The film premiered at the Tribeca Film Festival on June 4, 2026.

== Filmography ==
=== Film ===
Year	Title	Role	Notes
2004	Terrorists	Drugstore Cashier	
2009	Strangers	Man	Short film
2009	In the Loop	Chad	
2009	The Honkys	O.G	Short film
2010	The Other Guys	Douglas	
2011	High Road	Tommy	
2011	Andy and Zach	Zach	Short film
2011	Damsels in Distress	Rick DeWolfe	
2012	Rich Girl Problems	Duncan	Short film
2013	The Heat	Paramedic	
2015	Spy	Man in Purple Tie	
2016	Other People	Paul	
2016	Ghostbusters	Garrett	
2016	Mascots	Mike Murray	
2017	The Lego Ninjago Movie	Zane	Voice
2017	Zane's Stand Up Promo	Zane	Voice; Short film
2017	The Post	Anthony Essaye	
2019	The Angry Birds Movie 2	Carl	Voice
2020	Downhill	Zach	
2020	David	—N/a	Short film Director, writer and producer
2021	Bud	—N/a	Short film Director, writer and producer
2022	Spin Me Round	Dana	
2025	Teenage Mutant Ninja Turtles: Chrome Alone 2 – Lost in New Jersey	Chrome Dome	Voice; Short film
2026	How to Make a Killing	Noah Redfellow	
2026	The Accompanist	—N/a	Director and writer
2026	A Statement	Anthony Scoville	

=== Television ===
Year	Title	Role	Notes
2005	My Wife, the Ghost	Geets Wilson	Episode #1.05
2006	Sexual Intercourse: American Style	Ted	Episode: "Incense and Candles"
2009	Washingtonienne	Mark	TV film
2010–13	The Office	Gabe Lewis	Main role, 51 episodes Nominated – SAG Award for Ensemble in a Comedy Series (2011–12)
2011	Funny or Die Presents	Stuart	Episode #2.09
2011	Bored to Death	Super Ray fan	Episode: "Nothing I Can't Handle by Running Away"
2012–15	The League	Lane	3 episodes
2013	Arrested Development	Trippler	Episode: "Off the Hook"
2013	Comedy Bang! Bang!	The Remarkable Greg	Episode: "Cobie Smulders Wears a Black & White Strapless Dress"
2013–14	Veep	Ed Webster	3 episodes
2013–16	The Good Wife	Jeff Dellinger	4 episodes
2014	Kroll Show	Cal Culvers	Episode: "Krolling Around with Nick Klown"
2014–17	Playing House	Zach Harper	Main role, 8 episodes
2014–19	Silicon Valley	Donald "Jared" Dunn	Main role, 53 episodes
2015	Drunk History	Lee Duncan	Episode: "Los Angeles"
2016	Animals.	Brian (voice)	Episode: "Pigeons"
2016	Better Things	Zach	Episode: "Woman Is the Something of the Something"
2017–25	Big Mouth	Various voices	5 episodes
2020	The Simpsons	Zane Furlong (voice)	Episode: "The Miseducation of Lisa Simpson"
2020–22	Avenue 5	Matt Spencer	Main role; 17 episodes
2023	The Afterparty	Edgar D. Minnows	Main role; 10 episodes
2024	In the Know	Lauren Caspian (voice)	Main role; also co-creator, writer, director, and executive producer
2024	What We Do in the Shadows	Joel	Episode: "P.I. Undercover: New York"
2025	Beavis and Butt-Head	Doctor (voice)	Episode: "Nuts/Bike"
2026	Mating Season	Josh the Bear (voice)	Main role

=== Web ===
Year	Title	Role	Notes
2011	The Podcast	Gabe Lewis	3 episodes
