= Olivia Newman =

American film director and screenwriter

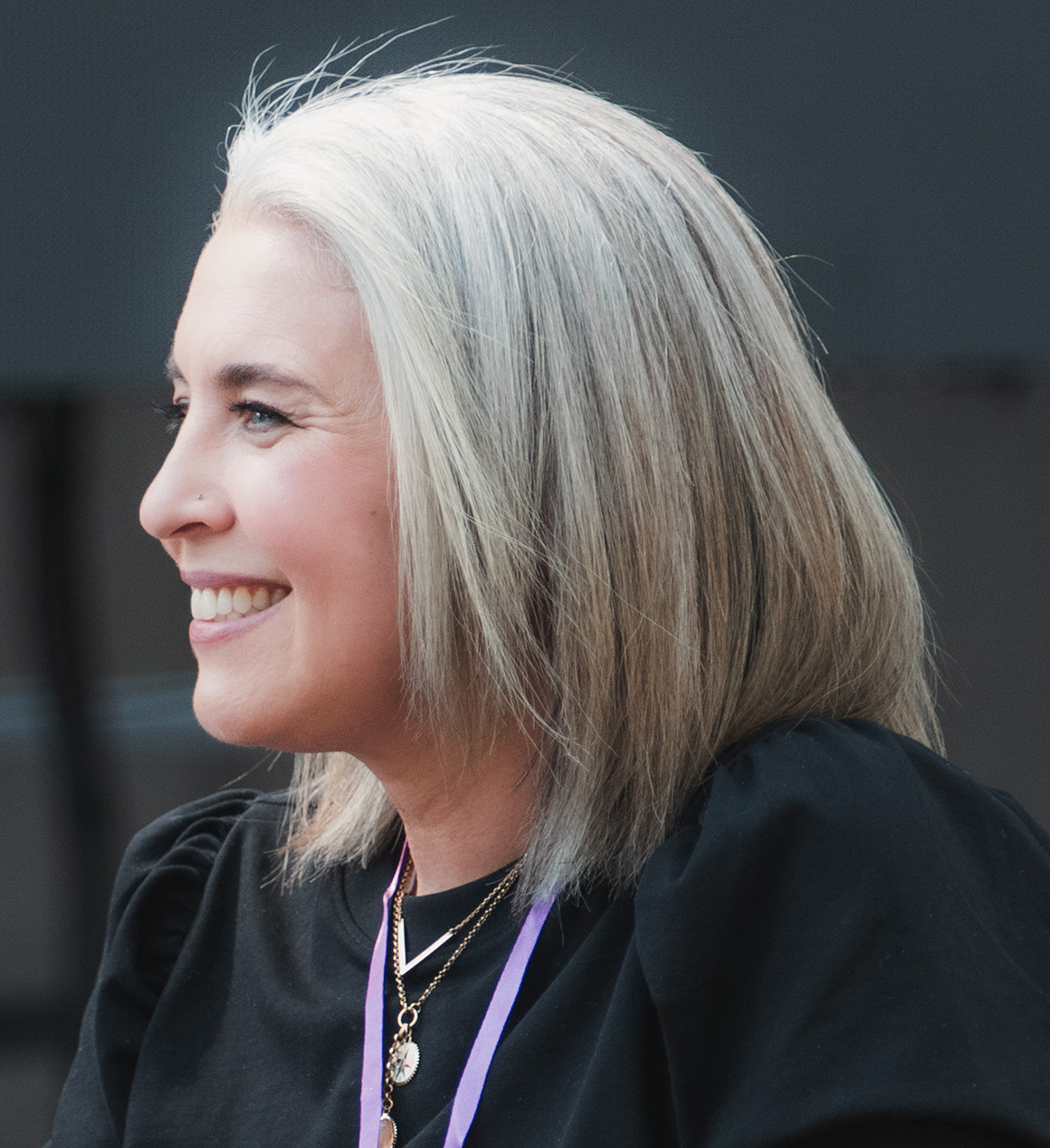
- Newman in 2026
- Born: Hoboken, New Jersey, U.S.
- Education: Vassar College (AB); Columbia University (MFA)
- Occupations: Film director, writer, producer
- Years active: 2009–present
- Spouse: Steve Lehman

Olivia Newman is an American film director and screenwriter. She is best known for directing First Match (2018), Where the Crawdads Sing (2022) and Remarkably Bright Creatures (2026).

== Life and career ==
Newman was born in Hoboken, New Jersey and graduated from The Hudson School in 1996. She holds an A.B. in French and women's studies from Vassar College and an M.F.A. in film from Columbia University. Her first short film, Blue-Eyed Mary, was shown at the Portland Oregon Women's Film Festival in 2010.

Newman made her feature directorial debut with the drama film First Match starring Elvire Emanuelle, Yahya Abdul-Mateen II, Colman Domingo and Jharrel Jerome, which premiered at the SXSW Film Festival. First Match was released by Netflix in 2018.

She directed the 2022 mystery thriller film Where The Crawdads Sing, an adaptation of the 2018 novel of the same name by Delia Owens. Despite mixed reviews from critics, audience reception was more positive and the film subsequently became a sleeper hit at the box-office, grossing $140 million on a $24 million budget.

She co-wrote and directed the 2026 adaptation of NY Times bestseller Remarkably Bright Creatures written by Shelby Van Pelt. The film was positively received by critics and audiences alike and went on to win two Emmys for Outstanding Movie and Best Actress in a Movie or Limited Series for Sally Field's performance.

== Filmography ==
Short film

Year	Title	Director	Writer	Producer
2009	Blue-Eyed Mary	Yes	No	No
2010	First Match	Yes	Yes	No
2010	Storm Up the Sky	No	No	Yes
2011	The Runner	No	No	Yes
2012	Lucky Duck	No	No	Yes

Feature film

Year	Title	Director	Writer
2018	First Match	Yes	Yes
2022	Where the Crawdads Sing	Yes	No
2026	Remarkably Bright Creatures	Yes	Yes

Television

Year	Title	Notes
2018–2019	Chicago Fire	Episodes "What Will Define You", "Move a Wall", "Badlands" and "Mercy"
2020	Dare Me	Episode "Parallel Tranches"
2020	Chicago P.D.	Episode "Mercy"
2020	FBI	Episode "Broken Promises"
2023	The Last Thing He Told Me	Episodes "Protect Her", "The Day After" and "Sanctuary"

== Accolades ==
Year	Award	Category	Nominated Work	Result	Ref.
2012	New Jersey Film Festival	Grand Prize	—N/a	Won	
2012	Aspen Shortsfest	Jury Award	—N/a	Won	
2018	SXSW Film Festival	SXSW Gamechanger Award	—N/a	Won	
2018	SXSW Film Festival	Audience Award	—N/a	Won	
2026	Primetime Emmy Awards	Outstanding Movie	Remarkably Bright Creatures	Won	
