= Sophie Traub =

Canadian actress

- Born: Canada
- Occupation: Actress

Sophie Traub is a Canadian actress. Her roles include Lucy, in the short film, Pink (2003), June alongside co-star Johnny Knoxville in Daltry Calhoun (2005), Young Silvia in The Interpreter (2005) and Lori alongside co-star Russell Crowe in Tenderness (2009). She also featured in a 2017 short film, God's Country, that was received with much critical acclaim. She is now working at the National Arts Centre
