= Remarkably Bright Creatures (novel) =

2022 novel by Shelby Van Pelt

- Author: Shelby Van Pelt
- Language: English
- Genre: Fiction
- Publisher: Ecco
- Publication date: May 3, 2022
- Publication place: United States
- Pages: 368
- ISBN: 9780063204157

Remarkably Bright Creatures is a novel by American author Shelby Van Pelt. It was published in May 2022 by Ecco Press. It has been on the New York Times hardcover fiction best-seller list multiple times.

It was awarded the 2023 McLaughlin-Esstman-Stearns First Novel Prize by the Writer's Center.

Remarkably Bright Creatures is a story of the friendship between Marcellus, a giant Pacific octopus, and Tova, a widow who cleans at the aquarium where Marcellus lives.

== Plot ==
Tova, an aquarium caretaker, befriends a Giant Pacific octopus named Marcellus, observing him frequently escape his enclosure. Early on in the story, while cleaning a tank and talking to Marcellus, she falls, and sprains her ankle, necessitating a temporary replacement worker at the aquarium.

Cameron, a 30-year-old searching for his biological father, arrives in town, he begins filling in at the aquarium, covering for Tova while she recovers. He stays in an RV he parks at the home of the town's grocery store owner, Ethan while he attempts to track down a real estate mogul named Simon Brinks whom he believes to be his dad.

While Ethan pursues a relationship with Tova, she decides to move into a retirement community in Bellingham, Washington and sells her home. She helps train Cameron on her duties at the aquarium and explains about Marcellus' escapades, in preparation for her departure. They form a bond and grow close.

Eventually, Cameron discovers Simon Brinks is not his father, and he angrily leaves town to return to Modesto. Meanwhile, Tova discovers through the actions of Marcellus that Cameron's real father was Tova's long-lost son who disappeared thirty years prior in a sailing accident. She frees Marcellus into the ocean, as he is close to death. She resolves to stay in Sowell Bay, to help care for the new octopus the aquarium has received. When Cameron returns to Sowell Bay the next morning, having decided not to leave, he goes to see Tova, and she reveals the truth about his father.

One month later, Cameron has remained in Sowell Bay, and continued his relationship with Avery, the owner of a local paddleboard shop. Tova has moved into a condo, become close with Ethan and Cameron and the four celebrate Thanksgiving together as a family.

== Characters ==
- Marcellus is a four-year-old giant Pacific octopus held captive at the Sowell Bay Aquarium near Puget Sound.
- Tova Sullivan is a 70-year-old widow who cleans the aquarium at night and becomes friends with Marcellus.
- Cameron Cassmore is a luckless 30-year-old on the verge of financial ruin, also known for his remarkable intellect. He befriends Tova when he moves to Sowell Bay and takes a maintenance job at the aquarium.
- Daphne Cassmore is Cameron's mother, a helpless, hopeless addict
- Ethan Mack is the owner of the small town's only grocery store, Shop-Way, romantically interested in Tova.
- Erik Sullivan was the son of Tova, presumed dead after disappearing in the ocean 30 years prior.
- Avery is Cameron's love interest, and owner of the local paddleboard shop.
- Cat is a stray who shows up at Tova's door early on in the story

== Sales ==
The book was a success, reportedly selling over two million copies and going through 30 reprintings since its 2022 debut.

== Film adaptation ==
A film based on the novel was released May 8, 2026, on Netflix, with actress Sally Field starring as Tova Sullivan. The film was directed by Olivia Newman and produced by Anonymous Content.

== Awards ==
- Finalist for the 2023 Audie Award for Audiobook of the Year
- 2023 McLaughlin-Esstman-Stearns First Novel Prize
