= The Correspondence =

2016 Italian romantic film written and directed by Giuseppe Tornatore

- Italian theatrical release poster
- Directed by: Giuseppe Tornatore
- Written by: Giuseppe Tornatore
- Produced by: Isabella Cocuzza; Arturo Paglia
- Starring: Jeremy Irons; Olga Kurylenko; Shauna Macdonald; Rod Glenn; Ian Cairns; Anna Savva
- Cinematography: Fabio Zamarion
- Edited by: Massimo Quaglia
- Music by: Ennio Morricone
- Production companies: Paco Cinematografica; Rai Cinema; Warner Bros.
- Distributed by: 01 Distribution
- Release date: 14 January 2016
- Running time: 122 minutes
- Country: Italy
- Language: English
- Budget: €13 million
- Box office: $3,832,684

The Correspondence (Italian: La corrispondenza) is an English-language Italian romantic film written and directed by Giuseppe Tornatore. It stars Jeremy Irons and Olga Kurylenko in lead roles, and was released on 14 January 2016. The film score was composed by Ennio Morricone in his final score before his death in 2020.

== Plot ==
A couple is kissing in a hotel room, astrophysics professor Ed (Jeremy Irons) and his lover the PhD student Amy Ryan (Olga Kurylenko). They can meet only occasionally, when Ed's work brings them together. He challenges her to reveal more of herself, perhaps something that bothers her but that she kept secret from him, but she refuses. Ed leaves the room for the airport hoping to see her at his next conference at her University. Next to her studies Amy has free-lance jobs as stuntwoman who is not afraid to perform dangerous scenes that normally lead to the death of the character: the movie shows her in action on occasion. She is even asked to model for a sculpture when this seems to demand near-suffocation.

It is shown later that Amy met Ed at one of his conferences 6 years ago and she fell in love with his way of talking about astrophysics. She keeps communicating with Ed through video chat, e-mails, and packages. One day, Amy realizes he is not attending his mobile phone but receives some emails from him. When reading the last one, she notices a maple leaf hitting her window, she watches it for a moment before it flies away.

The next day, Amy attends Ed's conference, but she receives a message in her phone from Ed to leave the place, but she doesn't. At the conference she learns that Ed died in Edinburgh some days earlier. She is shocked that she is still receiving messages from Ed's email account. Confused but eager to investigate she goes to Edinburgh. First she tries to go to Ed's home, but she feels uncomfortable to see Ed's family. She then receives an email instructing her to go to see his lawyer. There she receives a package with a video message, where Ed apologizes to her for having left her alone, but he could not reveal to her he was sick.

Back home Amy decides to go to the same hotel where they shared the nights and she receives a package with one of his clothes and a letter instructing her to celebrate his birthday in his summer house in Italy, on an island in a mountain lake. She travels there where she receives a package containing a new laptop and another video where he celebrates his birthday but decided to give her the laptop as a present. She spends the rest of the time seeing the places that he suggests her to visit. In the last night she receives another video message revealing that he knows her darkest secret, an accident she feels she may have caused that killed her father. She angrily burns the CD with the video and sends an encrypted message (11 times the name AMY) to stop all his messages, and goes back home.

Later, Amy regrets having stopped the chain of messages. She asks one of her colleagues from the movie industry to recover whatever he can from the burnt CD, but with minimal luck despite help from a friend in the Secret Service. Instead, he suggests that the camera used to record the messages might still have a copy. Despondent, she travels back to Edinburgh, where she finally confronts Ed's daughter who initially reveals her anger for her father's great love, but eventually decides to help her after admitting her envy of her father's love for Amy. However, Amy could not get additional information from Ed's daughter. In addition, Amy visits Ed's faithful lawyer again, who reveals to her that he was asked to give her the packages and messages according to a plan Ed set up in the last few months of his life, to the point of hacking his email account so that the messages that appear to go to Ed actually go to a person who then follows Ed's instructions explaining what to do. One of those correspondents is Ed's lawyer again, who has messages from Ed for her but, since the correspondence has stopped on Amy's request, tells her that the only way he can hand those over is if Ed tells him to do so. She makes her way back to Ed's summer house in Italy, where Octavio the trusted ferry man eventually gives her a bag that Ed had lost on the beach when he left for the last time to die. That bag contains memory cards with Ed's last videos that show Ed trying to film while suffering the symptoms of a brain tumor. Meanwhile, she decides to use the new laptop to begin filming herself speaking about herself as if sending messages to Ed, even revealing the details of the accident that killed her father.

One day, Amy finds her home ravaged by robbers and her new laptop stolen, but in the mess she notices Ed's old notebook with pencil impressions marks of his last letter. With a soft pencil the impressions come out. With this information she realizes that she used the wrong code to resume the correspondence: it should have been 10 times the name "ED", not 11 times. Inspired by Ed's returning messages, which challenge Amy to reconnect with her mother and to finish her doctoral thesis, she puts her life together again. In her stunt work she even accepts to do a stunt she had refused to do earlier: a car stunt that is very similar to the accident in which her father died. Amy survives again, but the stuntman in the same seat that her father died feigns death as well. Once she has overcome her trauma she concentrate only on her studies.

Encouraged by Ed's messages, Amy reconnects with her mother, and she eventually receives one of Ed's messages that help her finish up with her PhD. In a series of Ed's letters that seem to anticipate what she would do. From the medical doctor that treated Ed during his last months she learns that Ed set up this whole charade in an attempt to keep Amy happy for some time. That demanded cooperation from Ed's friends: most of them agreed, but the doctor thought it was a bad idea and refused. In any case Amy continues to get further instructions including from Ed's daughter after she has obtained her degree. The last one instructs her to go to another lawyer's office, where she finds out that she has inherited the summer house in Italy. She flies there and receives a last message from Ed where he reflects that humanity made a mistake that prevents them from immortality. For him, his mistake was not knowing Amy before, and with this message he sends his final farewell to her.

Amy goes back and attends an exhibition, where she sees the statue she modeled for but not the one they hired her for: instead, the artist realized the sadness expressed by the failed cast she modeled, in which she did not remain still but could not hide her emotions in dealing with Ed's death. The artist explains that he's tried to find the person who modeled the statue but doesn't realize that Amy is right there. She leaves. Outside she meets a colleague from the movie stunt business who tried to reach her, in vain because she cut off much of her communication channels. While he's been interested in her all along, it is only now that she recognized the younger man that Ed's messages have predicted she would see and "would be a little like him", thereby giving her permission to move beyond her love for Ed. Amy declines his invitation for a drink that evening, but promises to call him. She walks back home alone, under a sky full of stars.

== Cast ==
- Jeremy Irons as Ed Phoerum
- Olga Kurylenko as Amy Ryan
- Shauna Macdonald as Victoria
- Simon Anthony Johns as Jason
- James Warren as Rick
- Oscar Sanders as Nicholas
- Paolo Calabresi as Prescatore Ottavio
- Rod Glenn as Grip
- Ian Cairns as George
- Anna Savva as Angela
- Florian Schwienbacher as Tommy
- Sammy Moreno as Alejandro
- Darren Whitfield as Custodian
- Simon Meacock as Artist
- James Smillie as Preside
- James Bloor as Ragazzo

== Production ==
The Correspondence was produced by Paco Cinematografica and Rai Cinema production, in cooperation with UniCredit Leasing S.p.A., and supported by BLS Südtirol – Alto Adige, Trentino Film Commission and Torino Piemonte Film Commission. Filming took place in a period of ten weeks in Italy, York and Edinburgh.

The Correspondence reunites much of the same production team behind Tornatore's The Best Offer, including the Italian director's long-time collaborator, Ennio Morricone, as composer.

== Reception ==
The Correspondence grossed $3,832,684 at the box office.
