= Bob Byington =

American film director

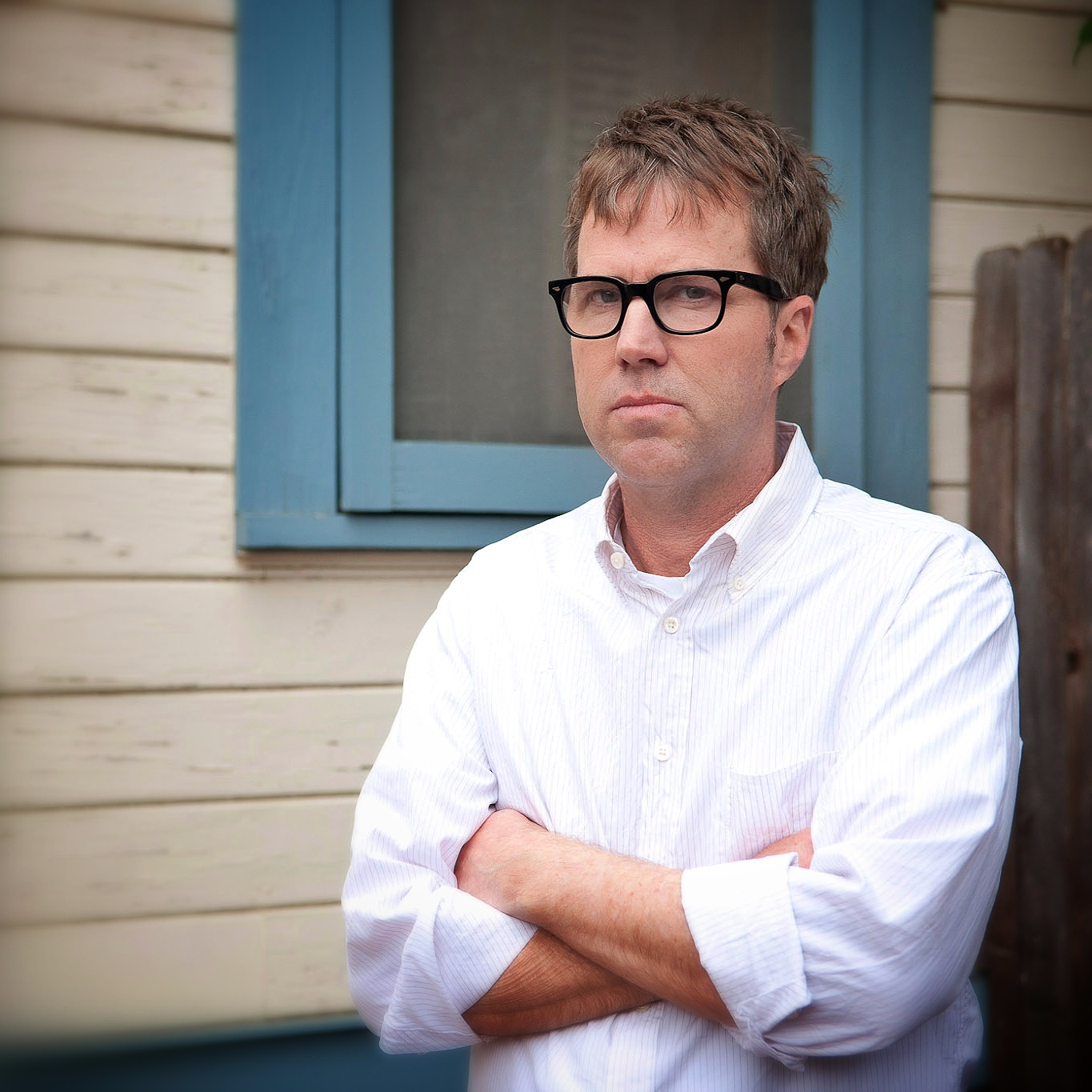
- Bob Byington, March 2014. Photographed by Matthew Mahon
- Born: Robert Byington; April 29, 1971 (age 55)
- Occupations: Film director Screenwriter; Actor
- Years active: 1996 – present

Robert Byington (born April 29, 1971) is an American film director, screenwriter and actor living in Austin, Texas. He is most noted for his films RSO (Registered Sex Offender) (2008), Harmony and Me (2009), Somebody Up There Likes Me (2012), winner of The Special Jury Prize at the 2012 Locarno Film Festival, 7 Chinese Brothers (2015) starring Jason Schwartzman, Olympia Dukakis and Tunde Adebimpe, Infinity Baby (2017) starring Kieran Culkin, Nick Offerman, and Martin Starr, and Lousy Carter (2023) starring David Krumholtz, Olivia Thirlby, and Starr.

== Career ==
Robert "Bob" Byington grew up in Lincoln, Nebraska. He studied at the University of California, Santa Cruz and received a masters in American Studies at the University of Texas at Austin. Byington directed his first film Shameless in 1996, and followed up with Olympia in 1998, which played on opening night of the South by Southwest Film Festival. He then entered a decade long "God-imposed" hiatus before directing his next three films RSO (Registered Sex Offender) (2008), Harmony and Me (2009) (the only USA-made film selected for Museum of Modern Art's 2009 New Directors/New Films Festival) and Somebody Up There Likes Me (2012).

His film, Frances Ferguson, premiered at South by Southwest in March 2019. His most recent film, Lousy Carter, premiered at the 76th Locarno Film Festival and was released in the United States on March 29, 2024.

== Style and content ==
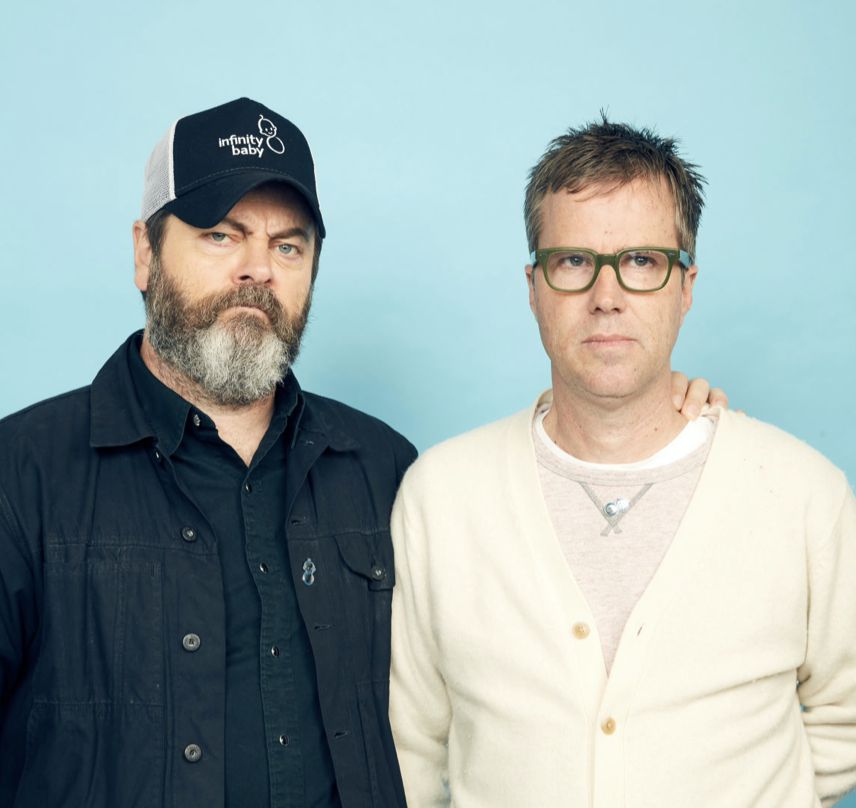
Byington with Nick Offerman at the 2017 SXSW Film Festival

Byington's work has been called literate, bawdy, sardonic and quirky. The Los Angeles Times described his film Harmony and Me as a "collision of joyous whimsy and bittersweet melancholy." His work is occasionally lumped in with the larger mumblecore movement in part because of his appearance in Andrew Bujalski's film Beeswax and his use of actors, such as Bujalski, Justin Rice, and Alex Karpovsky, who appeared in movies carrying the mumblecore label.

Byington considers his films thematically different from mumblecore and has resisted the label. Variety agreed in its review of Harmony and Me describing Byington's work as "mumblecore without the mumble." Unlike the extreme naturalistic dialogue of many mumblecore films, Byington's work leans towards exact dialogue and, according to Roger Ebert, "perfect timing" which is "unreasonably funny". Filmmaker Magazine likened his rich humor to the New Hollywood comedies of the 1970s. Concerning the process for his body of difficult-to-characterize films that nevertheless get made and seen, Byington says, "I tend to write screenplays I can imagine directing, which may explain why my films are so unambitious" (https://www.imdb.com/name/nm0125887/quotes/?ref_=nm_dyk_qu).

Notable actors Byington has cast in two or more of his films include Nick Offerman, Stephen Root, Kristen Tucker, Martin Starr, Megan Mullally, Keith Poulson, Kevin Corrigan, David Krumholtz and Suzy Nakamura. Offerman starred in Byington's film, Somebody Up There Likes Me, which premiered at the 2012 SXSW Film Festival in Austin, Texas. Offerman is also the narrator of Byington's Frances Ferguson, a film with a discomforting subject matter, which star Kaley Wheless calls an "offbeat comedy, not for everybody" (https://thewest.com.au/entertainment/movies/revelation-perth-international-film-festival-kaley-wheless-is-one-of-cinemas-more-endearing-sex-predators-in-frances-ferguson-ng-b881604528z).

== Awards ==
- Harmony and Me
  - People's Choice Award for Best Narrative, Denver Film Festival
- Somebody Up There Likes Me
  - Special Jury Prize, Locarno International Film Festival
- 7 Chinese Brothers
  - Founders Prize Special Award, Traverse City Film Festival
- Infinity Baby
  - Best Narrative Feature, Woodstock Film Festival
- Frances Ferguson
  - Best Narrative Feature, Sidewalk Film Festival
  - Jury Award Winner, Indianapolis International Film Festival

Michael Moore awarded Byington the Stanley Kubrick Award for "bold and innovative filmmaking" in 2009.

== Filmography (as writer and director) ==
- Shameless (1996)
- Olympia (1998)
- RSO [Registered Sex Offender] (2008)
- Harmony and Me (2009)
- Slacker 2011 (2011) (segment)
- Somebody Up There Likes Me (2012)
- 7 Chinese Brothers (2015)
- Infinity Baby (2017)
- Frances Ferguson (2020)
- Lousy Carter (2023)
