= Baker Center =

The Baker Center or Baker Centre may refer to:

- Baker Center (Austin, Texas), a historic former school in Austin
- Baker Center for Children and Families, a research and training institute affiliated with Harvard Medical School
- Ella Baker Center for Human Rights, based in Oakland, California
- Howard H. Baker, Jr. Center for Public Policy, at the University of Tennessee
- John Calhoun Baker University Center, at Ohio University
- Tom Baker Cancer Centre, at the Foothills Medical Centre in Calgary, Alberta, Canada
- Walter Baker Sports Centre, in Ottawa, Ontario, Canada
