= Dean Israelite =

South African film director

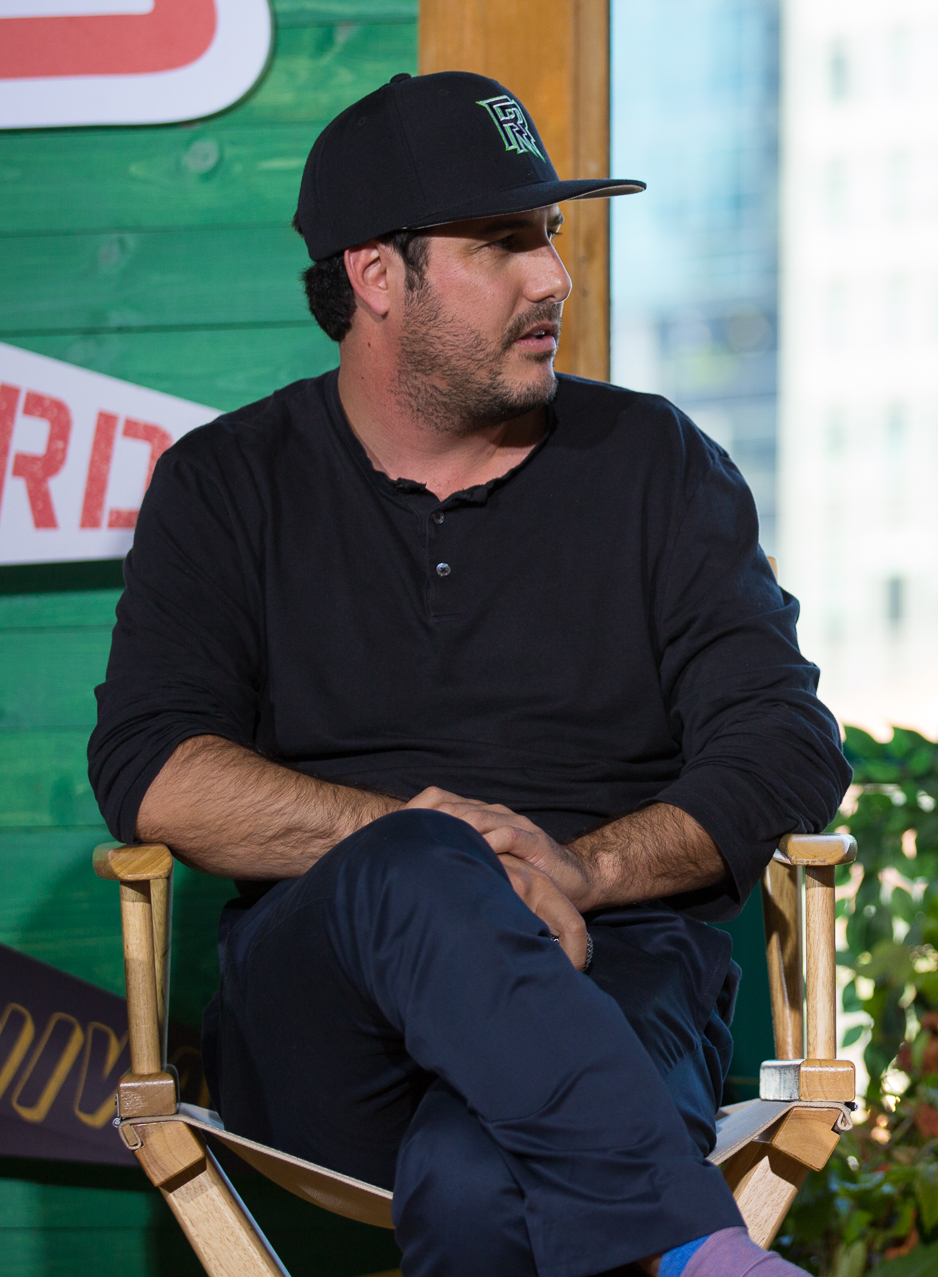
- Israelite in 2016
- Born: September 20, 1984 (age 41); Johannesburg, Gauteng, South Africa
- Education: Curtin University (MFA)
- Occupations: Film director, writer, producer
- Years active: 2006–present
- Known for: Project Almanac; Power Rangers
- Relatives: Jonathan Liebesman (cousin); Jason Xenopoulos (cousin)

Dean Israelite (born September 20, 1984) is a South African filmmaker, best known for directing the found footage film Project Almanac (2015), the 2017 reboot of Power Rangers, and the 2019 reboot of Are You Afraid of the Dark.

== Early life ==
Israelite was born and raised in Johannesburg, South Africa, and studied Dramatic Art at the University of the Witwatersrand. He moved to Australia and graduated in Film and Television from Curtin University, then earned his MFA from the American Film Institute. His cousin is director Jonathan Liebesman. He is of Jewish background.

== Career ==
Israelite started his career with writing and directing several short films, including Acholiland.

In 2015, Israelite made his feature film directing debut with the found footage science fiction thriller Project Almanac, based on the script by Jason Pagan and Andrew Deutschman. Michael Bay produced the film, which was released on January 30, 2015 by Paramount Pictures, grossing more than $32 million with a budget of $12 million. Israelite directed Lionsgate's Power Rangers film (2017), based on the screenplay by John Gatins, with a story by Matt Sazama, Burk Sharpless, Michelle Mulroney and Kieran Mulroney, which was released on March 24, 2017 by Lionsgate Films, grossing $142.3 million against a production budget of $100 million. It was a box office failure, losing the studio an estimated $74 million, when factoring in all revenues and expenses.

=== Future and cancelled projects ===
In February 2014, Israelite was among the directors who were being eyed by the Marvel Studios to direct the superhero film Doctor Strange, but later in June 2014 Scott Derrickson was confirmed as director.

In June 2014, Israelite was set to direct the remake of the 1983 film WarGames for Metro-Goldwyn-Mayer, based on the script by Arash Amel.

In October 2017, Israelite was set to direct Unexplained Phenomenon, a sci-fi thriller for Amblin Entertainment and The Picture Company. He also pitched to Amblin a supernatural thriller entitled Minotaur.

In February 2020, he joined the action thriller Rogue to direct for STXfilms, Tencent, and David S. Goyer.

In January 2024, he became attached to direct the Kevin Hart produced-thriller Can You Hear Me? for The Hideaway Entertainment.

== Filmography ==
Short film

Year	Title	Director	Writer
2006	Magician	Yes	Yes
2007	The Department of Nothing	Yes	Yes
2009	Acholiland	Yes	Yes

Feature film

- Project Almanac (2015)
- Power Rangers (2017)
- Little Wing (2024)

Television

Year	Title	Director	Executive producer	Notes
2008	Die Jugendcops - Kommissariat 105 im Einsatz	Yes	No	
2019–2022	Are You Afraid of the Dark?	Yes	Yes	Directed 7 episodes
2020–2021	The Astronauts	Yes	Yes	Directed 5 episodes
