= Postmortem (1998 film) =

- Directed by: Albert Pyun
- Written by: John Lowry Lamb; Robert McDonnell
- Produced by: Tom Karnowski; Gary Schmoeller
- Starring: Charlie Sheen; Ivana Miličević; Stephen McCole
- Cinematography: George Mooradian
- Edited by: Nataša Đurković
- Music by: Anthony Riparetti
- Release date: June 30, 1998 (US video premiere)
- Running time: 105 minutes
- Country: United States
- Language: English

Postmortem (released as Obit in the United Kingdom) is a 1998 American drama film directed by Albert Pyun and starring Charlie Sheen, Ivana Miličević and Michael Halsey. It was filmed in Glasgow, Scotland.

== Plot ==
American criminal profiler and author James McGregor (Charlie Sheen), who is trying to escape his past by moving to Scotland, receives a fax of a stranger's obituary. The next day he is arrested and charged with the stranger's murder, forcing him to collaborate with the local authorities if he wants to clear himself and stop a serial killer.

== Cast ==
- Charlie Sheen as James McGregor (Charles Sheen)
- Michael Halsey as Inspector Balantine
- Ivana Miličević as Gwen Turner
- Stephen McCole as George Statler
  - Alan Orr as Young George Statler
- Gary Lewis as Wallace
- Dave Anderson as Captain Moore
- Phil McCall as George Statler Sr.
- Ian Hanmore as Theodore Symes
- Zoë Eeles as Nurse
- Annabel Reid as Girl in Country Store
- Simon Weir as Beverly's Boyfriend
- Ian Cairns as The Undertaker

== Production ==
The film was shot in Glasgow in 1997. At one point during production, Sheen demanded to visit Easterhouse, one of Glasgow's toughest areas at the time, to obtain drugs and asked for a gun to protect himself. It is suggested Sheen agreed to this film in an attempt to try more serious roles.
