= 7 Chinese Brothers =

- Theatrical release poster
- Directed by: Bob Byington
- Written by: Bob Byington
- Produced by: Molly Christie Benson; Seana Flanagan; Nancy Schafer
- Starring: Jason Schwartzman; Stephen Root; Jonathan Togo; Olympia Dukakis; Alex Ross Perry; Alex Karpovsky; John Gatins; Bob Byington; Jennifer Prediger; Eleanore Pienta; Tunde Adebimpe
- Cinematography: Adam Ginsberg
- Edited by: Robert Greene; Leah Marino
- Music by: Chris Baio
- Production companies: 8750 Films; Faliro House Productions
- Distributed by: Screen Media Films
- Release dates: March 15, 2015 (SXSW); August 28, 2015 (United States)
- Running time: 75 minutes
- Country: United States
- Language: English

7 Chinese Brothers is a 2015 American comedy film written and directed by Bob Byington and starring Jason Schwartzman, Stephen Root, Olympia Dukakis, Jonathan Togo, and Alex Karpovsky. The film was released on August 28, 2015, in a limited release and through video on demand.

== Premise ==
Larry (Jason Schwartzman) along with his trusty sidekick French bulldog Arrow (Schwartzman's real life pet), goes through life as a misanthropic outcast looking for work and a purpose in life.

== Cast ==
- Jason Schwartzman as Larry
- Stephen Root as George
- Olympia Dukakis as Grandma
- Tunde Adebimpe as Major Norwood
- Eleanore Pienta as Lupe
- Jonathan Togo as Don
- Alex Karpovsky as Kaminsky
- Alex Ross Perry as Hats at Cars
- Anna Margaret Hollyman as Angry Audrey
- John Gatins as Dinsmore
- Jordan Hargett as Dog Walker
- Bob Byington as White BMW Guy
- Jennifer Prediger as Lady with Glasses

== Release ==
The film premiered at South by Southwest on March 15, 2015. On May 5, 2015, Screen Media Films acquired distribution rights to the film. The film was released on August 28, 2015, in a limited release and through video on demand.

== Reception ==
7 Chinese Brothers received positive reviews from critics. On Rotten Tomatoes, the film has an approval rating of 78%, based on 36 reviews, with a rating of 6.2/10. On Metacritic, the film has a score of 56 out of 100, based on 16 critics, indicating "mixed or average" reviews.
