= Little Wing (2024 film) =

Film by Dean Israelite

- Release poster
- Directed by: Dean Israelite
- Written by: John Gatins
- Based on: "Little Wing" by Susan Orlean
- Produced by: Naomi Despres; John Gatins
- Starring: Brooklynn Prince; Che Tafari; Kelly Reilly; Brian Cox
- Cinematography: Jeff Cutter
- Edited by: Martin Bernfeld
- Music by: Anne Nikitin
- Production companies: Awesomeness Films; De Line Pictures; Sunswept Entertainment
- Distributed by: Paramount+
- Release date: March 13, 2024
- Running time: 99 minutes
- Country: United States
- Language: English

Little Wing is a 2024 American coming-of-age drama film directed by Dean Israelite and written by John Gatins. It stars Brooklynn Prince, Che Tafari, Kelly Reilly, and Brian Cox. It is based on the 2006 New Yorker magazine article by Susan Orlean. Little Wing was released by Paramount+ on March 13, 2024.

== Plot ==
In Portland, Oregon, teenager Kaitlyn's parents have divorced. Her mother is ready to sell the family home. A family friend gives Kaitlyn two pigeons, and in studying the details of pigeon care and racing, Kaitlyn learns that a pigeon breeder with a valuable racing pigeon lives nearby. Kaitlyn and her best friend steal the pigeon and sell it to the Russian Pigeon Mafia, but the rightful owner finds her school bag on his roof, and so is able to track her down. Rather than turning her into the police, the breeder decides to work with Kaitlyn to recover the pigeon.

== Cast ==
- Brooklynn Prince as Kaitlyn McKay
- Che Tafari as Adam King
- Brian Cox as Jaan Vari
- Kelly Reilly as Maddie McKay
- Simon Khan as Matt McKay
- Trinity Jo-Li Bliss as Tessa Lu
- Melanie Nicholls-King as Ms. Gibbons
- Jeanine Jackson as Pat Litch
- Lowell Deo as Ben Lasher
- Jonathan Togo as Sean McKay

== Production ==
In April 2023, it was announced that a coming-of-age drama film directed by Dean Israelite and written by John Gatins was in production for Awesomeness Films and Paramount+. It is based on the magazine article of the same name by Susan Orlean, who also served as an executive producer. The original article follows Sedona Murphy, a 13-year old-girl who raised homing pigeons in her South Boston backyard.

Principal photography occurred in April 2023 in Portland, Oregon. Some scenes were shot along the Hawthorne Bridge.

== Release ==
Little Wing was released by Paramount+ on March 13, 2024.

== Reception ==
On the review aggregator website Rotten Tomatoes, 45% of 11 critics' reviews are positive.
