= Lousy Carter =

2023 film by Bob Byington

- Theatrical release poster
- Directed by: Bob Byington
- Written by: Bob Byington
- Produced by: Bob Byington; Chris McKenna
- Starring: David Krumholtz; Olivia Thirlby; Martin Starr; Stephen Root; Jocelyn DeBoer; Trieste Kelly Dunn
- Cinematography: Carmen Hilbert; Lauren Pruitt
- Edited by: Kris Boustedt
- Music by: Leafcuts
- Production company: Americano Brutto
- Distributed by: Magnolia Pictures
- Release dates: August 9, 2023 (Locarno); March 29, 2024 (United States)
- Running time: 80 minutes
- Country: United States
- Language: English
- Box office: $11,236

Lousy Carter is a 2023 American comedy film written, directed, and produced by Bob Byington. It stars David Krumholtz, Olivia Thirlby, Martin Starr, Stephen Root, Jocelyn DeBoer, and Trieste Kelly Dunn.

== Premise ==
Lousy Carter was once an acclaimed animator as a young man, but has settled into his middle-aged life as a mediocre college literature professor with a cantankerous personality. When visiting the doctor, he learns that he only has six months to live due to a terminal illness. Rather than trying to turn his life around, he tells no one about his diagnosis and simply continues on with his unexceptional life and failed relationships.

== Cast ==
- David Krumholtz as Lousy Carter
- Martin Starr as Kaminsky
- Olivia Thirlby as Candela
- Jocelyn DeBoer as Olivia Kaminsky
- Trieste Kelly Dunn as Sister
- Stephen Root as Analyst
- Macon Blair as Dick Anthony
- Luxy Banner as Gail
- Jesse Singal as Prison Guy

== Production ==
Jay Duplass was originally set to star before dropping out and being replaced by David Krumholtz. The film was shot in 15 days in December 2021, primarily at the Baker Center in Austin, Texas.

== Release ==
After premiering at the 76th Locarno Film Festival, the film was acquired by Magnolia Pictures for domestic distribution. The film was released in the United States on March 29, 2024.

== Reception ==
On the review aggregator website Rotten Tomatoes, 71% of 35 critics' reviews are positive, with an average rating of 6.0/10. Metacritic, which uses a weighted average, assigned the film a score of 59 out of 100, based on 9 critics, indicating "mixed or average" reviews.
