= The Misogynists =

- Directed by: Onur Tukel
- Written by: Onur Tukel
- Produced by: Gigi Graff; Karl Jacob
- Starring: Dylan Baker; Lou Jay Taylor; Trieste Kelly Dunn; Ivana Miličević; Nana Mensah
- Cinematography: Zoe White
- Edited by: Onur Tukel
- Release date: October 6, 2017 (Hamptons International Film Festival)
- Running time: 85 minutes
- Country: United States
- Language: English

The Misogynists is a 2017 comedy film written and directed by Onur Tukel and starring Dylan Baker, Lou Jay Taylor, Trieste Kelly Dunn, and Ivana Miličević. The film is set on the night of the 2016 United States presidential election.

== Cast ==
- Dylan Baker as Cameron
- Lou Jay Taylor as Baxter
- Trieste Kelly Dunn as Amber
- Ivana Miličević as Sasha
- Nana Mensah as Blake

== Release ==
The Misogynists had its world premiere at the Hamptons International Film Festival on October 6, 2017. The film later played at the Indie Memphis Film Festival, the Denver International Film Festival, and the Cucalorus Film Festival.
