= Infinity Baby =

- Directed by: Bob Byington
- Written by: Onur Tukel
- Produced by: Barry Lacina; Christos V. Konstantakopoulos; Veronica Leon; Rebecca Eskreis; Megan Mullally; Nick Offerman
- Starring: Kieran Culkin; Trieste Kelly Dunn; Nick Offerman; Martin Starr; Kevin Corrigan; Megan Mullally; Noël Wells; Stephen Root
- Cinematography: Matthias Grunsky
- Edited by: Kris Boustedt
- Music by: Aesop Rock
- Release dates: March 11, 2017 (SXSW); September 15, 2017 (United States)
- Running time: 80 minutes
- Country: United States
- Language: English

Infinity Baby is an American science fiction comedy film directed by Bob Byington from a screenplay by Onur Tukel. The film stars Kieran Culkin, Trieste Kelly Dunn, Nick Offerman, Martin Starr, Kevin Corrigan, Megan Mullally, Noël Wells, and Stephen Root. It was released in 2017.

== Plot ==
The film is described as a "lightly futuristic comedy about babies who don’t age."

== Cast ==
- Kieran Culkin as Ben
- Trieste Kelly Dunn as Alison
- Nick Offerman as Neo
- Martin Starr as Malcolm
- Kevin Corrigan as Larry
- Megan Mullally as Hester
- Noël Wells as Theresa
- Stephen Root as Fenton
- Martha Kelly as Ava
- Jonathan Togo as Intern
- Zoe Graham as Tiffany
- Jennifer Prediger as Lydia

== Production ==
Principal photography for the film began in April 2016.

== Release ==
The film premiered at South by Southwest in March 2017.
