= Project Almanac =

2015 science fiction film

- Theatrical release poster
- Directed by: Dean Israelite
- Written by: Jason Harry Pagan; Andrew Deutschman
- Produced by: Andrew Form; Bradley Fuller; Michael Bay
- Starring: Jonny Weston; Sofia Black-D'Elia; Sam Lerner; Allen Evangelista; Virginia Gardner; Amy Landecker
- Cinematography: Matthew J. Lloyd
- Edited by: Julian Clarke; Martin Bernfeld
- Production companies: Insurge Pictures; MTV Films; Platinum Dunes
- Distributed by: Paramount Pictures
- Release date: January 30, 2015
- Running time: 106 minutes
- Country: United States
- Language: English
- Budget: $12 million
- Box office: $33.2 million

Project Almanac is a 2015 American found footage science fiction film directed by Dean Israelite in his directorial debut, and written by Jason Harry Pagan and Andrew Deutschman. The film stars Jonny Weston, Sofia Black-D'Elia, Sam Lerner, Allen Evangelista, Virginia Gardner and Amy Landecker. The film tells the story of a group of high school students who build a time machine.

Filmed in 2013 and originally planned for an early 2014 release, the release date was later moved to January 30, 2015. Upon release, Project Almanac received generally mixed reviews from critics and audiences, and grossed $33 million against a production budget of $12 million.

== Plot ==
High school senior and aspiring inventor David Raskin is admitted into the Massachusetts Institute of Technology, but is unable to afford its exorbitant tuition. Upon learning his mother, Kathy, will be forced to sell the family's house, David enlists his sister Christina and his friends Adam Lee and Quinn Goldberg to search through the belongings of his father Ben, an inventor who died on David's seventh birthday, in the hopes of finding something David can use to get a scholarship, filming themselves all the while.

He finds an old camera with a video recording of his seventh birthday party, in which he briefly spots himself (at his current age) in a reflection. Noting how he appears to be reaching for a basement light switch in the reflection, David and his friends enter the basement, which his father had forbidden.

The group pull the switch, activate a trapdoor, and find blueprints for a time travel device that Ben was developing for a project called "Project Almanac" for DARPA, a government agency, which allows them to build a functional time machine. They successfully send a toy car back in time, but cause a blackout in their neighborhood. When they get noticed by David's crush Jessie Pierce, whose car's fuel cell they use to power the device, they recruit her into their experiment.

The expanded group travel back to the day before and break into Quinn's house, where he draws on the back of his sleeping past self's neck, but the past Quinn awakens, causing a feedback loop that nearly erases them both from the timeline. Following this, they agree to use the machine for personal gain on the condition that they don't time jump solo. At first, the machine's capacity would only allow them to time jump three weeks into the past at most, so they test it further by giving Quinn another chance to succeed at his science presentation, Chris getting back at a bully, as well as winning the lottery (though they actually end up winning the second place prize due to Adam's writing a wrong number). While at Lollapalooza three months prior, David hesitates to declare his feelings for Jessie, causing their relationship to become awkward, so he travels alone back to Lollapalooza to change that, leading to a future in which they are a couple.

When he returns, he finds that the blackout they caused in the first experiment resulted in their school's star basketball player getting hit by a car and breaking his leg, which in turn caused the player's pilot father to crash a commercial airliner, among other global catastrophes. David goes back alone to save the player and avert the plane crash, only to discover that Adam was hospitalized and in a coma after a car accident.

David continues to travel back in time alone to rectify the accidents, but Jessie catches him during one of his trips and accidentally sends herself back with him. She confronts him, and David admits to using the time machine to win her affection. As Jessie lambastes David for his deception, her past self appears, causing a feedback loop that erases Jessie from the timeline.

Seeing no other way out, David goes back to prevent the machine from ever being created, but it is out of hydrogen fuel. As David returns to the present, he is confronted by the police, who suspect him of being connected to Jessie's disappearance. Narrowly evading the resulting manhunt, David is able to break into his school and obtain a hydrogen canister. He activates the machine just as the police break in and sends himself back to his seventh birthday party ten years ago.

In the basement, David confronts Ben, who recognizes him and realizes that he will eventually complete the machine. David convinces Ben of the machine's dangers and tells him that he should say goodbye to his son before destroying the blueprints and a vital component. David is erased from the timeline, though he accidentally leaves behind his camera.

In the alternate timeline, David and Christina go through their father's belongings when they find Ben's camera and the previous timeline's camera. While they are shocked by the second camera's footage of the previous timeline's events, David approaches Jessie at school, displays knowledge of the future, and confides in her that they are about to "change the world".

== Cast ==
- Jonny Weston as David Raskin, Christina's brother, and best friend to Adam and Quinn
- Sofia Black-D'Elia as Jessie Pierce, David's longtime crush
- Sam Lerner as Quinn Goldberg, best friend to Adam and David
- Allen Evangelista as Adam Le, best friend to Quinn and David
- Virginia Gardner as Christina Raskin, David's sister
- Amy Landecker as Kathy Raskin, David and Christina's mother and Ben's wife
- Gary Weeks as Ben Raskin, David and Christina's father and Kathy's husband
- Michelle DeFraites as Sarah Nathan
- Patrick Johnson as Todd
- Gary Grubbs as Dr. Lu
- Katie Garfield as Liv

Members of rock bands Imagine Dragons and Atlas Genius appear briefly as themselves during the movie's Lollapalooza sequence.

== Production ==
In April 2013, it was reported that Paramount Pictures had formally greenlit Almanac a found footage film centered on time travel to be produced by Michael Bay through Platinum Dunes with Dean Israelite making his directorial debut on the film. Paramount acquired the script by Jason Pagan and Andrew Stark in October 2012, which appeared on the 2012 Black List of the best unproduced screenplays. Paramount fast tracked development of the film hoping it would produce a level of success on par with Chronicle while also trying to get the film complete before a competing found footage time travel film at DreamWorks titled Glimmer.

Principal photography began in June 2013 in Atlanta, Georgia.

Shortly before the film's release, it was discovered that the footage turned in to Paramount featured 2 seconds of a real-life plane crash. Although sources differ on where the film clip was from, Paramount has said the footage is of a 2009 crash (FedEx Express Flight 80) while the Air Force Times reported that footage was "nearly identical" to a 1994 incident that happened at Fairchild Air Force Base, and two of the 1994 crash victim's families claimed that it was indeed the same footage. Upon learning about this, producer Michael Bay publicly apologized stating that when he saw the footage he thought it was a special effect shot and asked Paramount to remove the footage from the film.

== Release ==
On February 5, 2014, Paramount Pictures postponed the release date from February 28, 2014, to an unknown date. Paramount partnered with MTV Films on the marketing of the film. On March 24, 2014, THR's Borys Kit tweeted that the film had been re-titled from Welcome to Yesterday to Project Almanac. The film was released on January 30, 2015.

Project Almanac grossed $22.3 million in North America and $10.9 million in other territories for a worldwide total of $33.2 million, against a budget of $12 million.

The film earned $3.1 million in its opening day (including previews) which was far below industry's estimate. The film made a total of $3.9 million in its second day and $1.4 million for its third day, bringing in a weekend gross of $8.5 million from 2,893 theaters, with a per-theatre average of $2,938 and finishing third at the box office.

== Reception ==
On Rotten Tomatoes, the film has an approval rating of 38% based on 100 reviews with an average rating of 6.4/10. The site's critical consensus reads, "Project Almanac isn't without wit or originality, but its thin story and irritating found-footage camerawork ultimately make it difficult to recommend." On Metacritic, the film has a score of 47 out of 100, based on 25 critics, indicating "mixed or average reviews". Audiences polled by CinemaScore on opening day gave the film an average grade of "B" on an A+ to F scale.

John DeFore of The Hollywood Reporter in his review said that the film "begins as a marginally fun diversion before proving to have nearly no interest in the possibilities of its premise."

A. A. Dowd of The A.V. Club gave the film a C+ and said, "As found-footage thrillers go, Project Almanac is perfectly watchable, but it never taps into the adolescent joy of its premise, the way Chronicle did."

== See also ==
- List of films featuring time loops
