= Somebody Up There Likes Me (2012 film) =

- Theatrical release poster
- Directed by: Bob Byington
- Written by: Bob Byington
- Produced by: Hans Graffunder; Nick Offerman
- Starring: Keith Poulson; Nick Offerman; Jess Weixler; Jonathan Togo; Stephanie Hunt
- Cinematography: Sean Price Williams
- Edited by: Frank V. Ross
- Music by: Chris Baio
- Distributed by: Tribeca Film
- Release date: March 11, 2012 (South by Southwest Film Festival)
- Running time: 76 minutes
- Country: United States
- Language: English

Somebody Up There Likes Me is a 2012 comedy film written and directed by Bob Byington and starring Keith Poulson, Nick Offerman, and Jess Weixler.

== Plot ==
The film skips through 35 years in the life of Max Youngman (Poulson), following him through his courtship and marriage to Lyla (Weixler), who is also the object of affection for his best friend Sal (Offerman). Never seeming to age, Max and the adult characters closest to him stumble in and out of comically misguided relationships and happenstances that are seamlessly woven together by animated vignettes provided by Bob Sabiston (A Scanner Darkly).

== Cast ==
- Nick Offerman as Sal
- Keith Poulson as Max
- Jess Weixler as Lyla
- Stephanie Hunt as Clarissa
- Marshall Bell as Lyla's Father
- Kate Lyn Sheil as Ex-Wife
- Kevin Corrigan as Memorial Man
- Jonathan Togo as Adult Lyle
- Megan Mullally as Therapist
- Anna Margaret Hollyman as Paula

== Release ==
Somebody Up There Likes Me premiered at the 2012 South By Southwest Film Festival in Austin, Texas. Following a theatrical release in Spring of 2013, the film was released to VOD services such as iTunes and Amazon Video. The film is also currently available through Netflix Watch Instantly.

== Reception ==
=== Critical response ===
The film received a mostly positive response from critics. It currently holds a 68% positive "Fresh" rating on the review aggregator Rotten Tomatoes.

Writing for Indiewire, critic Eric Kohn praised the film, saying "The tone combines supreme deadpan delivery with a light, airy atmosphere that brings to mind Wes Anderson without the requisite pandering to hip expectations. There's nothing inherently cool or exciting about Max, and yet in his endless quest to find happiness in life--or in death--he's a supremely likable creation who endures multiple eras with the same passive attitude, and so emerges as an everyman for all times (including, during the quasi-science fiction finale, a version of the future that brings to mind Idiocracy)." David Lewis of the San Francisco Chronicle also praised the film, saying in his review, "American cinema has been churning out slacker movies for what seems like eons, so it's refreshing to report that Somebody Up There Likes Me enlivens the genre with a welcome breath of imagination, wit and charm."

Conversely, Neil Genzlinger of The New York Times was slightly more negative, commenting "It’s all kind of cute. Maybe a little too cute, but it does have a nice circle-of-life ending. And along the way, Mr. Byington shows a knack for observational humor, slipping in sly jokes that force you to keep paying attention despite the slim plot. Droll and interesting; just not very substantial."

=== Accolades ===
It won the Special Jury Prize at the 2012 Locarno International Film Festival.
