= The Hippopotamus (film) =

- Directed by: John Jencks
- Based on: The Hippopotamus by Stephen Fry
- Starring: Roger Allam
- Distributed by: Lightyear Entertainment
- Release dates: 14 January 2017 (Palm Springs International Film Festival); 28 May 2017 (United Kingdom)
- Country: United Kingdom

The Hippopotamus is a 2017 British film, adapted from Stephen Fry's 1994 novel of the same name. Filmed in 2015 under the direction of John Jencks, the film chronicles a failed poet who is summoned to his friend's country manor to investigate a series of unexplained miracles.

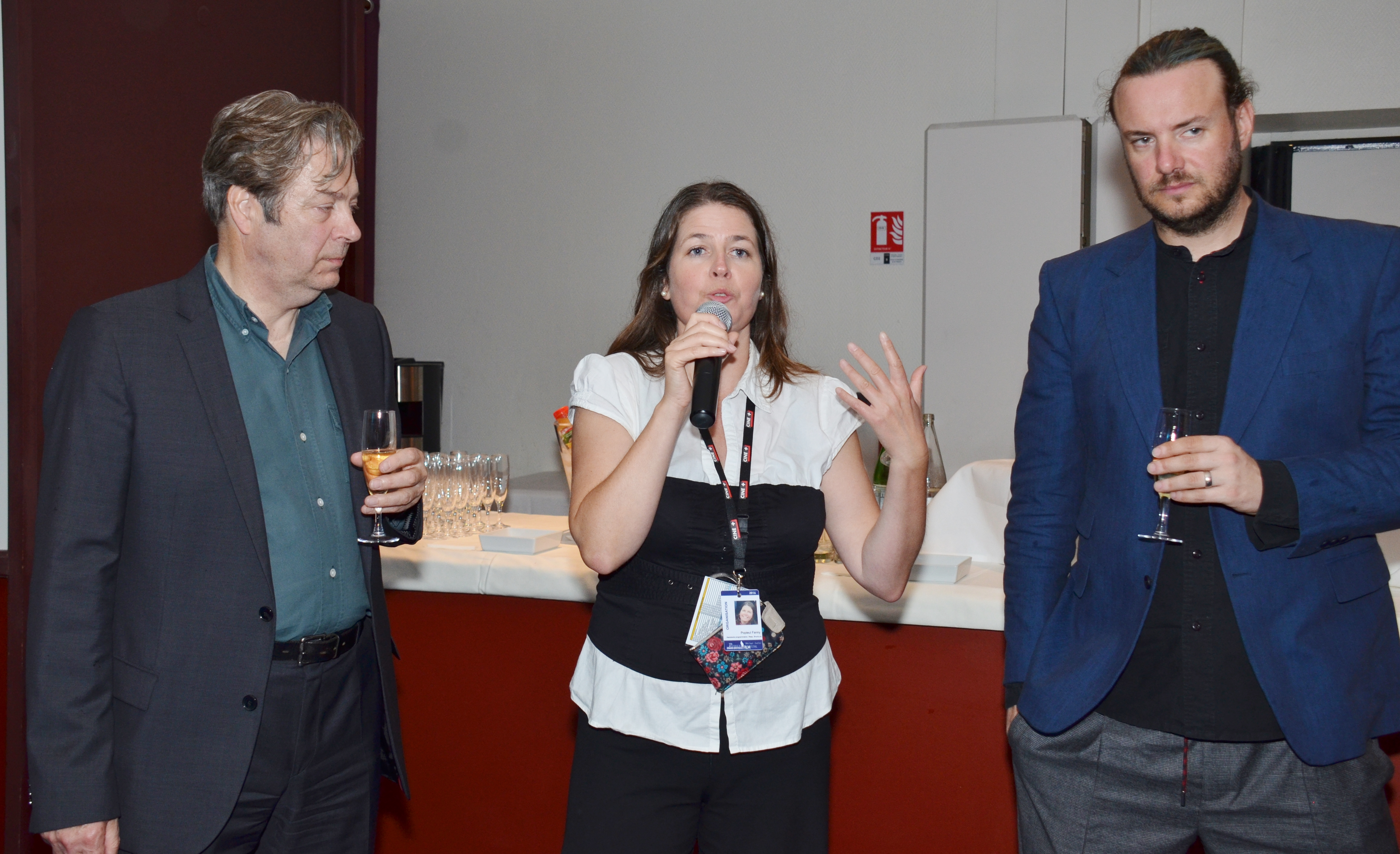
Roger Allam and John Jencks at the 2016 Dinard British Film Festival

== Plot ==
Edward "Ted" Wallace is an ageing, jaded writer and former poet. Having not written a poem since 1987, he is stuck writing reviews of small-time plays, wallowing in his bath and compulsively drinking. When Ted loses his job after heckling a poorly performed play, he runs into his god daughter Jane, who lavishly pays him to investigate a series of miracles occurring at her family's manor in light of her unexplained apparent recovery from leukaemia.

At the manor, owned by his former friend Michael, Lord Logan, Ted becomes acquainted with his sixteen-year-old godson, David, who displays an unusual fascination with sex and nature. Also at the manor is David's brother Simon, Michael's angina-afflicted friend Oliver, who hopes to obtain funding for his new play, socially awkward Frenchwoman Clara Richmond, and her wealthy mother Valerie, who seeks to purchase one of the manor's horses, Lilac, for Clara. Ted's abrasive attitude conflicts with the other residents' perky optimism, while David converses with Ted about both his interests and his ambitions of becoming a fellow poet.

One day, Lilac appears to contract ragwort poisoning, despite ragwort not growing in the area. While Michael and company despair over the possibility of having to euthanise Lilac, Ted learns that the miracles he was sent to investigate were performed by David, who reportedly healed his mother from a severe asthma attack simply by touching her when Simon's CPR seemed effective, later curing Jane's leukaemia over several days through the same method. The following day, he appears to perform more miracles by curing Lilac's poisoning and Oliver's angina, leading Valerie to pursue him in hopes of improving Clara's appearance.

David and Clara secretly head to the woods, resulting in a search across the manor's grounds. Ted eventually finds Clara performing fellatio on a coercive David. Bewildered, he simply chooses to observe the pair before Simon discovers them and interrupts, causing a panicked Clara to bite David's penis. After Simon takes Clara back to the manor, Ted comes out of hiding and drives a bleeding David to the hospital. On the way back, David explains to Ted that he believes his healing powers come from his moral purity and a spiritual connection with nature, channelled though his hands and especially his semen; Ted rubbishes this as blind delusion, leading a heartbroken David to abandon him.

Once Ted returns to the manor, he is confronted by Michael's sister Rebecca, who bears a grudge against Ted for him publicly humiliating her on live television many years ago; Rebecca insults Ted and rebukes him for his interference in Michael's family's life, leaving Ted to sulk alone in his room for the rest of the night. While there, he accidentally knocks over and smashes his whisky bottle, realising that Lilac's poisoning was actually a hangover from drinking the contents of a bottle he dropped in an outdoor bucket. The following evening, he reveals this to the manor's residents when they agree to publicize David's healing abilities. Ted additionally discloses that Simon's CPR had rescued his mother during her asthma attack and that Jane's recovery from leukaemia was a remission of its symptoms. Ted further explains David's confidence in his semen's abilities and how this led him to have morally dubious sex with Jane, Lilac and Oliver. Ted's acidic lecture disgusts and angers the residents of the manor and leads an eavesdropping David to attempt suicide by burying himself alive. The others discover David's absence and rescue him before Ted is forced to deliver the unfortunate news that Jane's leukaemia has returned.

Time passes and the group has moved on from the events of that night. At Jane's funeral, David explains to Ted that his new "normal" life is one of hard work. Ted's experiences from the summer at Michael's manor have reignited his sense of wonder; having written five new poems for the first time in nearly 30 years and preparing to write two more, a solitary Ted ushers a toast "to miracles".

== Cast ==
- Roger Allam as Ted Wallace
- Rod Glenn as Bassianus
- Andrew Alexander as Matthew Lake
- Russell Tovey as Rupert Keynes
- Paul Bown as Roddy
- Emily Berrington as Jane Swann
- Dean Ridge as Simon Logan
- Thaila Zucchi as Mrs. Vance
- Fiona Shaw as Anne Logan, Lady Logan
- Tommy Knight as David Logan
- Matthew Modine as Michael Logan, Lord Logan
- Tim McInnerny as Oliver Mills
- Emma Curtis as Clara Richmonde
- Lyne Renée as Valerie Richmonde
- Geraldine Somerville as Rebecca Logan
