= Annabel Reid =

Scottish actress

- Education: Queen Margaret's College
- Occupation: Actress

Annabel Reid is a Scottish actress.

She received a bachelor's degree in acting from Queen Margaret's College in 1996.

She has played in Post-mortem (starring Charlie Sheen) and The Infinite Worlds of H. G. Wells. She has also starred in several short films. On television she played in Dream Team, Monarch of the Glen, Taggart, and Rab C. Nesbitt.

Reid is represented by Soho Voices, Voice Over Agency in the UK. She has done commercial voiceover work for Pfitzer and corporate voiceover work for Coutts and Adams Bank.
