= Trieste Kelly Dunn =

American actress

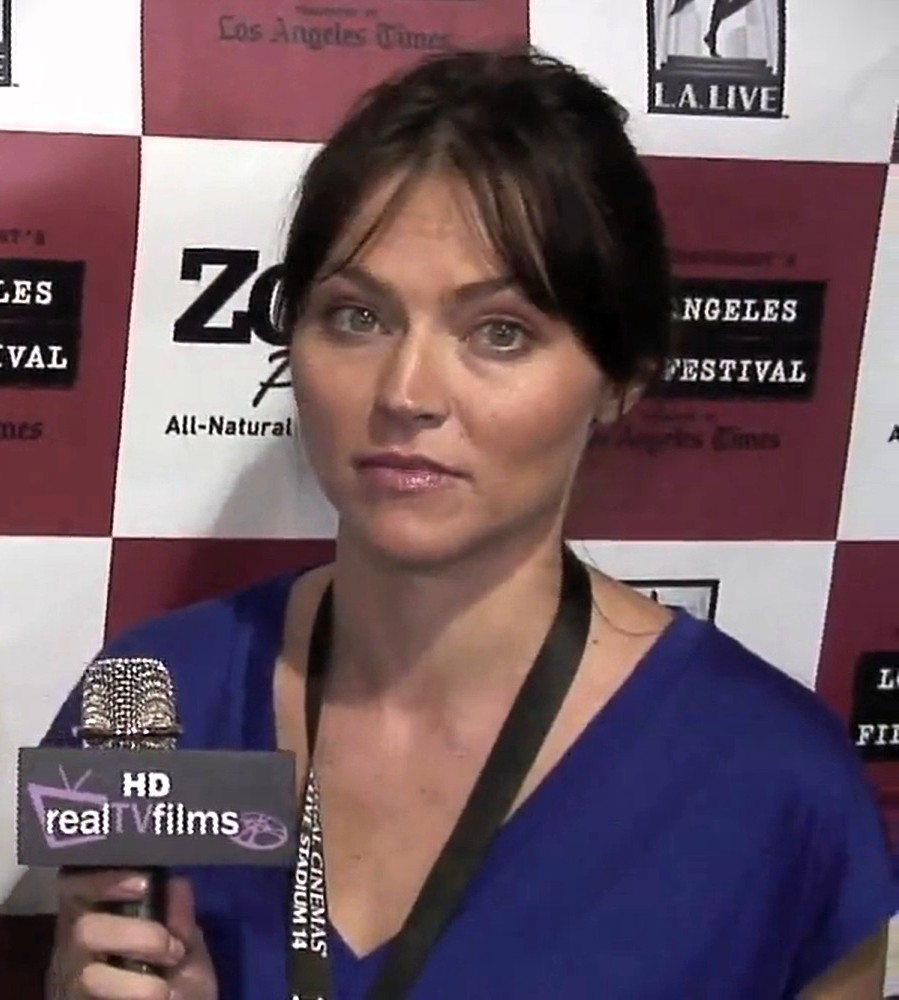
- Dunn discusses The New Year at the Los Angeles Film Festival in 2010
- Born: Provo, Utah, U.S.
- Education: University of North Carolina School of the Arts (BFA)
- Occupation: Actress
- Years active: 2004–present

Trieste Kelly Dunn is an American actress. She is known for her roles as Deputy Siobhan Kelly in the Cinemax series Banshee and U.S. Marshal Allison Knight in the NBC series Blindspot.

== Personal life ==
Dunn studied theater at the North Carolina School of the Arts. Before graduating in 2004, she appeared in a number of student films. Including those made by classmates and future collaborators Zach Clark, Brett Haley, Aaron Katz, and Brendan McFadden.

In 2010, Filmmaker Magazine named her one of the 25 New Faces of Independent in their Summer Issue, and the Los Angeles Times touted her as a "break out star" based on her roles in the independent films Cold Weather and The New Year.

== Career ==
Dunn first rose to prominence on the FOX TV series Canterbury's Law as Molly McConnell opposite Julianna Margulies. Her early film roles included critically lauded turns in United 93 (2006), Cold Weather (2010) and Vacation! (2010). She has also appeared on Fringe as Valerie Boone, the victim of a scientific experiment in the episode "Midnight", and also guest starred on HBO's Bored to Death. In 2014, she portrayed FBI Agent Elizabeth Ferrell on the TV series Believe concurrently with her co-starring role as Dep. Siobhan Kelly in Banshee. In late 2015, Dunn began a recurring role as U.S. Marshal Allison Knight, on the NBC drama Blindspot. In 2015, she played Natalie, a recurring character in the single season of Almost There, on Audience. Dunn has also appeared in guest roles on episodes of a number of other television series.

She portrayed an android in the music video for "Propagation", the single off Com Truise's 2017 album Iteration.

== Filmography ==
=== Film ===
Year	Title	Role	Notes
2004	Mysterious Skin	Date in "Blood Prom"	
2006	United 93	Deora Frances Bodley	
2010	Cold Weather	Gail	
2010	The New Year	Sunny	
2010	Vacation	Donna	
2013	Loves Her Gun	Allie	
2015	Applesauce	Nicki	
2016	Almost There	Natalie	
2017	Infinity Baby	Alison	
2017	Blame	Jennifer	
2017	The Misogynists	Amber	
2019	Girl on the Third Floor	Liz Koch	
2023	Lousy Carter	Sister	

=== Television ===
Year	Title	Role	Notes
2006	Law & Order: Special Victims Unit	Gloria Kulhane	Episode: "Class"
2008	Canterbury's Law	Molly McConnell	Main cast
2009	Cupid	Sonja	Episode: "The Tommy Brown Affair"
2009	Fringe	Valerie Boone	Episode: "Midnight"
2009	Bored to Death	Sophia	Episode: "The Case of the Beautiful Blackmailer"
2011	Brothers & Sisters	Lori Lynn	Episode: "Walker Down the Aisle"
2013–2015	Banshee	Siobhan Kelly	Main Cast (seasons 1–3); 26 episodes
2013	Golden Boy	Margot Dixon	Recurring character
2014	Believe	Elizabeth Farrell	Recurring character
2015	The Good Wife	Amanda Marcassin	Episode: "Innocents"
2015–2020	Blindspot	Allison "Allie" Knight	Recurring character
2016	Royal Pains	Rachel	Episode: "Palpating the Orbital Rim"
2016	Bull	Captain Taylor Mathison	Episode: "The Woman in 8D"
2018	Manhunt: Unabomber	Theresa Oakes	2 episodes
2018	Elementary	Sophie Bishop	Episode: "An Infinite Capacity for Taking Pains"
2018	Strangers	Elliott	Episode: "Big Little Chill"
2019	The Passage	Sierra Thompson	Recurring character
2022	See	Ambassador Trovere	5 episodes
2025	Chicago Fire	Lieutenant Gregory	Episode: "Too Close"
