= Ivana Miličević =

American actress (born 1974)

- Born: 26 April 1974 (age 52); Sarajevo, SR Bosnia and Herzegovina, SFR Yugoslavia
- Occupations: Actress; model
- Years active: 1995–present
- Spouse: Paddy Hogan (m. 2018)
- Children: 1
- Relatives: Tomo Miličević (brother)

Ivana Miličević (pronounced [ǐʋana milǐːt͡ʃevit͡ɕ]; born 26 April 1974) is a Croatian-American actress and model, best known for her starring roles in the Cinemax action-drama series Banshee (2013–2016) and The CW science fiction drama series The 100 (2018–2020).

Miličević had roles in films such as Vanilla Sky (2001), Down with Love (2003), Love Actually (2003), Just like Heaven (2005), Casino Royale (2006), Running Scared (2006), What's Your Number? (2011), and Catfight (2016).

She guest starred in numerous television series, including The Nanny (1997), Seinfeld (1997), Felicity (1998–1999), Buffy the Vampire Slayer (2002), Friends (2003), Charmed (2003), One on One (2004), American Dad! (2006–2008), Ugly Betty (2007), Chuck (2008), Psych (2012), Power (2016), and Gotham (2016–2017).

== Early life ==
Miličević was born in Sarajevo, SR Bosnia and Herzegovina, SFR Yugoslavia (modern-day Bosnia and Herzegovina), to Bosnian Croat parents. She emigrated to the United States at the age of five and was raised in Detroit, Michigan. Miličević's younger brother is Tomo Miličević, who was previously the lead guitarist of the rock band Thirty Seconds to Mars. She also had a younger brother, Filip, who died in August 2016. She became a naturalized citizen of the United States. In 1992, Miličević graduated from high school and moved to Los Angeles in pursuit of an acting career.

== Career ==
Miličević first achieved success in modeling, and gained the reputation of being the "Bosanska Žizel" (transl. Bosnian Gisele) because of her resemblance to the famous Brazilian supermodel Gisele Bündchen. She worked as a model while attending Athens High School in Troy, Michigan.

Miličević began acting after graduation, appearing in the 1998 thriller film Enemy of the State. She then had guest appearances in numerous television series, including Charmed, Seinfeld, Felicity, Nash Bridges, The Nanny (with former Bond girl Lois Chiles), Buzzkill, Buffy the Vampire Slayer, Yes, Dear, Chuck, House, Friends, Pushing Daisies, Hawaii Five-0, and The Mind of the Married Man. She was on the cover of Paper in 2002. In the same year, she appeared in the music video of Marc Anthony's I Need You.

In 2006, she starred in the CBS comedy series Love Monkey and played the role of Valenka in the James Bond film Casino Royale. In 2007, she played Lena on Ugly Betty. In 2008, she starred in Witless Protection. Miličević played the Soviet intelligence officer Dasha Fedorovich in Command & Conquer: Red Alert 3 and in Command & Conquer: Red Alert 3 – Uprising. From January 8 to 29, 2011, she starred alongside Maggie Lawson, Kurt Fuller, and Peter Mackenzie in the Red Dog Squadron production of Greedy by Karl Gajdusek at the El Centro Theatre in Hollywood.

In 2018, she joined the cast in the fifth season of The CW science fiction drama series The 100, recurring until its conclusion in 2020. Also in 2020, she had starring roles as Striga in the animated fantasy series Castlevania and as Arianna Demachi in the action drama series Strike Back: Vendetta.

== Personal life ==
On 14 April 2018, Miličević gave birth to a son, Phoenix Jedi Hogan. Miličević and Paddy Hogan married on December 29, 2018.

== Filmography ==
=== Film ===
Year	Title	Role	Notes
1995	Children of the Corn III: Urban Harvest	Acolyte / Eli's Follower	Uncredited
1996	Jerry Maguire	Former Girlfriend	
1997	The Big Brass Ring	Cela Brandini	Short film
1998	Postmortem	Gwen Turner	
1998	Kiss the Sky	Ilsa	
1998	Crazy Six	Anna	Direct-to-video
1998	October 22	Debra	
1998	Enemy of the State	Ruby's Sales Clerk	
1999	Love Stinks	Amber	
1999	House on Haunted Hill	Period Film Actress	Scenes deleted
2001	Head over Heels	Roxana	
2001	Impostor	Gang Girl	
2001	Vanilla Sky	Emma	
2002	Four Reasons	Model	
2003	Down with Love	Yvette	
2003	Mail Order Bride	Nina	
2003	Love Actually	Stacey / American Dreamgirl	
2003	Paycheck	Maya-Rachel	
2005	The Return of the Muskrats	Agent	Short film
2005	Slipstream	Sarah Tanner	
2005	Her Minor Thing	Zsa Zsa	
2005	In Her Shoes	Caroline	
2005	Just like Heaven	Katrina	
2006	Running Scared	Mila Yugorsky	
2006	The Plague	Jean Raynor	Direct-to-video
2006	The Elder Son	Tanya	
2006	Casino Royale	Valenka	
2007	Battle in Seattle	Carla	
2008	Witless Protection	Madeleine Demcowski	
2008	Columbus Day	Cheryl	Direct-to-video
2008	Your Name Here	The Blonde	
2009	Reflections	Human 2	Short film
2010	Red Rooster	Tiree	Short film
2010	All American Tooles	Ivana Jackovich	Short film
2010	Beneath the Blue	Gwen	
2011	Coming & Going	Ivana	
2011	What's Your Number?	Jacinda	
2011	The Howling: Reborn	Kathryn Kidman / Kay	Direct-to-video
2015	Aloha	Carson Biographer	
2015	Guns for Hire	Friday Green	
2016	Catfight	Rachel	
2017	The Misogynists	Sasha	
2022	Broken Soldier	Elly	
2025	The Astronaut	Dr. Michelle Alden	

=== Television ===
Year	Title	Role	Notes
1997	Seinfeld	Patty	Episode: "The Comeback"
1997	Hollywood Confidential	Waitress	Television film
1997	Unhappily Ever After	Oksana	Episode: "From Russia with Love"
1997	The Nanny	Tasha	Episode: "No Muse Is Good Muse"
1997	The Devil's Child	Unknown role	Television film
1998	House Rules	Cinnamon	Episode: "Dude Act Like a Lady"
1998	The Army Show	Private Lana Povac	4 episodes
1998–1999	Felicity	Sensa	2 episodes
2000	Nash Bridges	Chase	2 episodes
2000	Secret Agent Man	Lara	Episode: "Sleepers"
2001–2002	The Mind of the Married Man	Missy	Main role; 20 episodes
2002	Buffy the Vampire Slayer	Samantha Finn	Episode: "As You Were"
2002	Just Shoot Me!	Katinka	Episode: "Mr. Jealousy"
2003	Yes, Dear	Kirsten	Episode: "Flirtin' with Disaster"
2003	Friends	Kori Weston	Episode: "The One with the Memorial Service"
2003	Charmed	Mist	2 episodes
2003	Chasing Alice	Unknown role	Television film
2004	Solstrom	Newlyweds Duo	Episode: "Twin Winds"
2004	CSI: Miami	Jen Kemp	Episode: "Wannabe"
2004	Frankenstein	Erika Helios	Television film
2004	Las Vegas	Angie Logan	Episode: "My Beautiful Launderette"
2004	Dark Shadows	Angelique Bouchard	Unaired television pilot
2004–2005	One on One	Ranya Rochenko	4 episodes
2006	The Unit	Ilona	Episode: "Natural Selection"
2006	Love Monkey	Julia	Main role; 8 episodes
2006–2008	American Dad!	Svetlana / Russian Spy	Voice; 3 episodes
2007	Ugly Betty	Lena	2 episodes
2007	Fallen	Ariel	Main role; 4 episodes
2008	Chuck	Ilsa Trinchina	Episode: "Chuck Versus the Undercover Lover"
2008	House	Woman in Black	Episode: "House's Head"
2008	12 Miles of Bad Road	Montserrat	Main role; 6 episodes
2008	Pushing Daisies	Hedda Lillihammer	Episode: "The Norwegians"
2009	Eleventh Hour	Isabelle Van Dyke	Episode: "Eternal"
2009	Without a Trace	Lana	Episode: "Heartbeats"
2009	Royal Pains	Kylie	Episode: "Nobody's Perfect"
2009	Eastwick	Ivanka	2 episodes
2010	Hawaii Five-0	Nadia Lukovic / Natalie Reed	Episode: "ʻOhana"
2011	Charlie's Angels	Nadia Ivanov	Episode: "Angel with a Broken Wing"
2012	Psych	Miss Ivana	Episode: "Autopsy Turvy"
2012	Vegas	Diane Desmond	2 episodes
2013–2016	Banshee	Anastasia / Carrie Hopewell	Main role; 36 episodes
2016	Roadies	Maureen	Episode: "The Corporate Gig"
2016	Power	Karen Bassett	4 episodes
2016–2017	Gotham	Maria Kyle	3 episodes
2018–2020	The 100	Charmaine Diyoza	24 episodes
2020–2021	Castlevania	Striga	Voice; main role; 20 episodes
2020	Strike Back: Vendetta	Arianna Demachi	8 episodes
2023	Captain Fall	Additional voices	Voice; 1 episode
2025	Sherlock & Daughter	Marjorie Anderson	6 episodes

=== Video games ===
Year	Title	Voice role	Notes
2008	Command & Conquer: Red Alert 3	Dasha Fedorovich	
2009	Command & Conquer: Red Alert 3 – Uprising	Dasha Fedorovich	
