= Stealing Harvard =

- Theatrical release poster
- Directed by: Bruce McCulloch
- Written by: Martin Hynes; Peter Tolan
- Produced by: Susan Cavan
- Starring: Tom Green; Jason Lee; Leslie Mann; Megan Mullally; Dennis Farina; Richard Jenkins; John C. McGinley; Chris Penn
- Cinematography: Ueli Steiger
- Edited by: Malcolm Campbell
- Music by: Christophe Beck
- Production companies: Columbia Pictures; Revolution Studios; Imagine Entertainment
- Distributed by: Sony Pictures Releasing
- Release date: September 13, 2002
- Running time: 85 minutes
- Country: United States
- Language: English
- Budget: $25 million
- Box office: $14.3 million

Stealing Harvard is a 2002 American slapstick action comedy film directed by Bruce McCulloch and written by Martin Hynes and Peter Tolan, about a man who resorts to crime to pay for his niece's Harvard tuition. The film stars Jason Lee and Tom Green with Leslie Mann, Dennis Farina, Richard Jenkins, John C. McGinley, Tammy Blanchard, and Megan Mullally; director McCulloch appears in a minor role. It was produced by Columbia Pictures, Revolution Studios and Imagine Entertainment and released on September 13, 2002, by Sony Pictures Releasing. Film critic reviews were generally negative, and the film was a box office bomb by grossing $14.3 million against a $25 million budget.

== Plot ==
John Plummer is engaged to Elaine Warner and intends to use their life savings of $30,000 to put a down payment on a house. He works for Elaine's father, Mr. Warner, who dislikes him.

Simultaneously, John's niece Noreen, daughter of sister Patty, is accepted to Harvard University, but needs an additional $30,000 on top of her grants and scholarships. Noreen shows John an old videotape where he promised to pay for Noreen's college. He now has a moral and financial dilemma – disappoint his fiancée or disappoint his niece and ruin her chance at escaping poverty.

John confides in his slacker of a friend Walter "Duff" Duffy, a landscaper. He convinces John to steal from one of his rich clients, who keeps large amounts of cash in an unlocked safe. The pair set off to steal the cash, but Duff runs away when lights come on in the home, leaving John to get caught by Emmett Cook.

At gunpoint, Cook forces John to cross-dress and role-play the part of Cook's late wife as the two men lie in bed and "spoon". Eventually, after taking an incriminating photograph of John, Cook releases him. As he is leaving, Mr. Warner rides by and takes note of John's panicked behavior, believing that he has caught John in an affair.

Further capers ensue as John and Duff try to rob a liquor store and later attempt to con a drug lord out of $30,000 by concocting a phony story about running an ecstasy ring. A police detective is on to John and Duff, but never has enough evidence to actually pin any of the crimes on them.

Meanwhile, Mr. Warner breaks into Cook's residence in order to get evidence against John, and when Cook catches him, he is forced to "spoon" as well. Despite this, Warner finds a common ground with him as he is also widower though he doesn't agree with Cook's method of coping. Before leaving, Warner finds the photo of John from the album, which he then gives to Elaine.

John is forced to confess everything to Elaine, who is not upset but admires the lengths he was willing to go to in order to please her and send his niece to Harvard. She then confides in him that her father keeps a great deal of money at his business, and that it would be easy for them to steal it.

John, Elaine, and Duff set out to rob the business in the night. Unfortunately, Mr. Warner had hid his dog Rex inside the vault. Rex latches on to Duff's crotch, and oddly, enjoys it so much that he doesn't let go. Just as John and Elaine find the money, Mr. Warner tries to attack them but he is caught by the detective who mistakes him for a burglar.

While Duff is relentlessly pursued by Rex, John and Elaine escape to Duff's van. The police arrive and the gang unsuccessfully tries to get away. They are all taken into custody by the detective and face a series of charges. John feels doomed, until the judge in charge of his arraignment turns out to be the gun-toting Emmett Cook.

Upon their mutual recognition, John flashes a written message to Cook, threatening to expose the judge's fetish; upon reading the note, he quickly dismisses all charges against John. Finally, Duff comes through as best he can and gives John his life savings of $1,000. John uses it to bet on a long-shot horse, which wins and pays out 30 to 1.

John and Elaine are married, Noreen goes off to college, and, in the final scene, John is left to ponder how Duff could possibly accumulate $1,000. The last scene shows Duff offering to "spoon" with Cook for $1,000.

== Cast ==
- Jason Lee as John Plummer
- Tom Green as Walter "Duff" Duffy
- Leslie Mann as Elaine Warner
- Dennis Farina as Mr. Warner
- Richard Jenkins as Honorable Judge Emmett Cook (credited as Mr. Cook)
- John C. McGinley as Detective Charles
- Tammy Blanchard as Noreen Plummer
- Megan Mullally as Patty Plummer
- Zeus as Rex The Dog
- Chris Penn as David Loach
- Seymour Cassel as Uncle Jack
- Ken Magee as Butcher
- Martin Starr as Liquor Store Kid
- Mary Gillis as Duff's Mother
- Bruce McCulloch as Fidio, The Lawyer
- Nick Offerman as an Electrician

== Production ==
In March 1997, it was reported that Martin Hynes had optioned his spec script Stealing Stanford, about a couple who turn to criminal activities as a last resort of getting their daughter's college tuition, to Imagine Entertainment for $150,000 against $400,000 for Universal Pictures. In June 1999, it was reported that John Pasquin was attached as director. In June 2000, Universal had reportedly entered into negotiations with Owen Wilson to star in the film. The following month, it was reported Revolution Studios had acquired Hynes' script in turnaround from Universal, which had since been rewritten by Peter Tolan, for seven figures with Bruce McCulloch attached to direct and Imagine to still produce. By October of that year, it was reported that Jason Lee had been cast to star opposite Tom Green with producer Brian Grazer describing the casting as being in service of the "irreverent and cool" tone for which they were aiming. Distribution was set to be handled by Sony Pictures.

== Reception ==
Stealing Harvard received negative reviews from critics. It currently holds a 9% rating on Rotten Tomatoes based on 105 reviews with the consensus: "There are laughs Stealing Harvard, but they are few and far between. Tom Green's antics grow old fast." Metacritic, which uses a weighted average, assigned the film a score of 25 out of 100, based on 25 critics, indicating "generally unfavorable" reviews. Audiences polled by CinemaScore gave the film an average grade of "C" on an A+ to F scale.

=== Box office ===
Released September 13, 2002 the film grossed US$14,036,406 at the U.S. box office.

== Accolades ==
Tom Green was nominated for Worst Supporting Actor in the 2002 Golden Raspberry Awards. Green also won Worst Actor at the 2002 Stinkers Bad Movie Awards.
