= Frances Ferguson (film) =

2019 American film directed by Bob Byington

- Directed by: Bob Byington
- Written by: Bob Byington; Kaley Wheless; Scott King
- Starring: Kaley Wheless; Keith Paulson; Nick Offerman; David Krumholtz; Martin Starr
- Cinematography: Carmen Hilbert
- Edited by: Kris Boustedt; Susan LaMarca
- Music by: Chris Baio
- Production company: The Substitute
- Release date: March 10, 2019 (South by Southwest)
- Running time: 74 minutes
- Country: United States
- Language: English

Frances Ferguson is a 2019 American comedy film written and directed, by Bob Byington. It stars Kaley Wheless, Keith Paulson, David Krumholtz, and Martin Starr and is narrated by Nick Offerman.

== Premise ==
Frances Ferguson is a dissatisfied, unhappily married substitute teacher at a high school in North Platte, Nebraska. A non-omniscient narrator guides us through various events in Frances' life as she sleeps with a student, gets incarcerated as a result, and then navigates her way through the results.

== Cast ==
- Kaley Wheless as Frances Ferguson
- Keith Paulson as Nick
- David Krumholtz as Group Therapy Leader
- Martin Starr as Mel
- Jennifer Prediger as Stepmom
- John Gatins as Warden
- Nick Offerman as Narrator

== Release ==
After premiering at the 2019 South by Southwest film festival, the film received generally positive reviews with a 70% rating on Rotten Tomatoes based on ten reviews.
