= Rod Glenn =

Rod Glenn is an English actor and author from northeast England.

He trained in Theatre and Performing Arts at North Tyneside College and has gone on to appear in many film and television productions, including Monster, Ripper Street, The More You Ignore Me, American Assassin, The Hollow Crown, Wolfblood and The Hippopotamus. His performance in Monster was described as 'one hell of a performance' and a 'revelation' by Ginger Nuts of Horror. Machine Mean described him as 'Glenn brought an incredibly unique intensity to this, clearly putting all into this role.'

He achieved critical and commercial success with Sinema: The Northumberland Massacre released in 2007 (Wasteland Press) and again in 2010 (Wild Wolf Publishing). A contemporary thriller set in the north east of England about a film-obsessed serial killer stalking a remote Northumberland community. Friday the 13th star and horror icon Adrienne King described it as "Masterful writing" and The Crack Magazine described it as "One of the most heart racing, jaw-dropping novels that I have ever dared to finish."

== Writing biography ==
- The King of America (2006) ISBN 978-1-4241-3156-3
- Sinema: The Northumberland Massacre (2007) ISBN 978-1-60047-156-8
- Radgepacket: Tales From The Inner Cities (2008) (Contributor) ISBN 978-0-9560788-0-3
- The King of America: Epic Edition (2009) ISBN 978-0-9562114-0-8
- The Killing Moon (2009) ISBN 978-0-9562114-8-4
- P.O.W. Wartime Log of F/Sgt T D Glenn (2010) (Contributor) ISBN 978-0-9563733-7-3
- Holiday of the Dead (2011) (Contributor) ISBN 978-1907954054
- Sinema 2: Sympathy for the Devil (2011) ISBN 978-1-907954-06-1
- Sinema 3: The Troy Consortium (2013) ISBN 978-1907954313
- Wild Wolf's Twisted Tails (2014) (Contributor) ISBN 978-1907954245
- Slaughterville (2017) ISBN 978-1907954658

== Acting filmography ==
- Michael Rice (singer) 'Bigger Than Us' Eurovision Song Contest Music Video (2019) : 'Nasty' Dad
- Monster (2018) : Richard
- American Assassin (2017) : Orion Instructor
- The More You Ignore Me (2017) : Ambulance Driver
- Judge Rinder's Crime Stories (2017) : Mark Stephens
- Guest in London (2017) : Police Sergeant
- Wolfblood (2016) : Wild Wolfblood Warrior
- The Hippopotamus (2016) : Bassianus
- God's Kingdom (2016) : Robin
- Outside (2016) : Robert Falcon Scott
- Bliss! (2015) : Dad
- Whiteblade (2015) : Aethelfrith
- Sweet Pea (2015) : Donald (lead)
- Becoming Freddie (2015) : Character 1
- The Exorcist Chronicles (2015) : Lance Corporal Spader
- The Sceptic (2015) : Dr Jan Lucane
- The Dark Ages (2015) : The Hitman & Stunts
- The Hollow Crown (2014) : Lord Stanley's Bodyguard & Fight Crew
- The Fairy Flag (2014) : Insubordinate Soldier & Fight Crew
- Dolls (2014) : DCI Jimmy Parkins
- Unbeaten (2014) : Fighter 1
- Ripper Street (2014) : Train Robber
- Too Young to Die (2014) : School Teacher
- Who Done What (2014) : Detective Inspector Galbraith
- Children of the World's End (2014) : Radio DJ
- Bill (2014) : Builder
- Macbeth (2014) : Macbeth Soldier & Fight Crew
- White Lies (2014) : Detective Briggs
- Fury (2013) : World War II American Soldier
- The Monuments Men (2013) : World War II British Soldier
- Shortcut to Hell (2013) : Thomas
- Run (2012) : Paul
- Broken England (2012) : Rob England
- The Bad Samaritan Must Die (2012) : Lead Bodyguard
- World War Z (2011) : Riot Police Officer
