= Baker Center (Austin, Texas) =

Historic Former School in Austin

- Baker School
- U.S. National Register of Historic Places
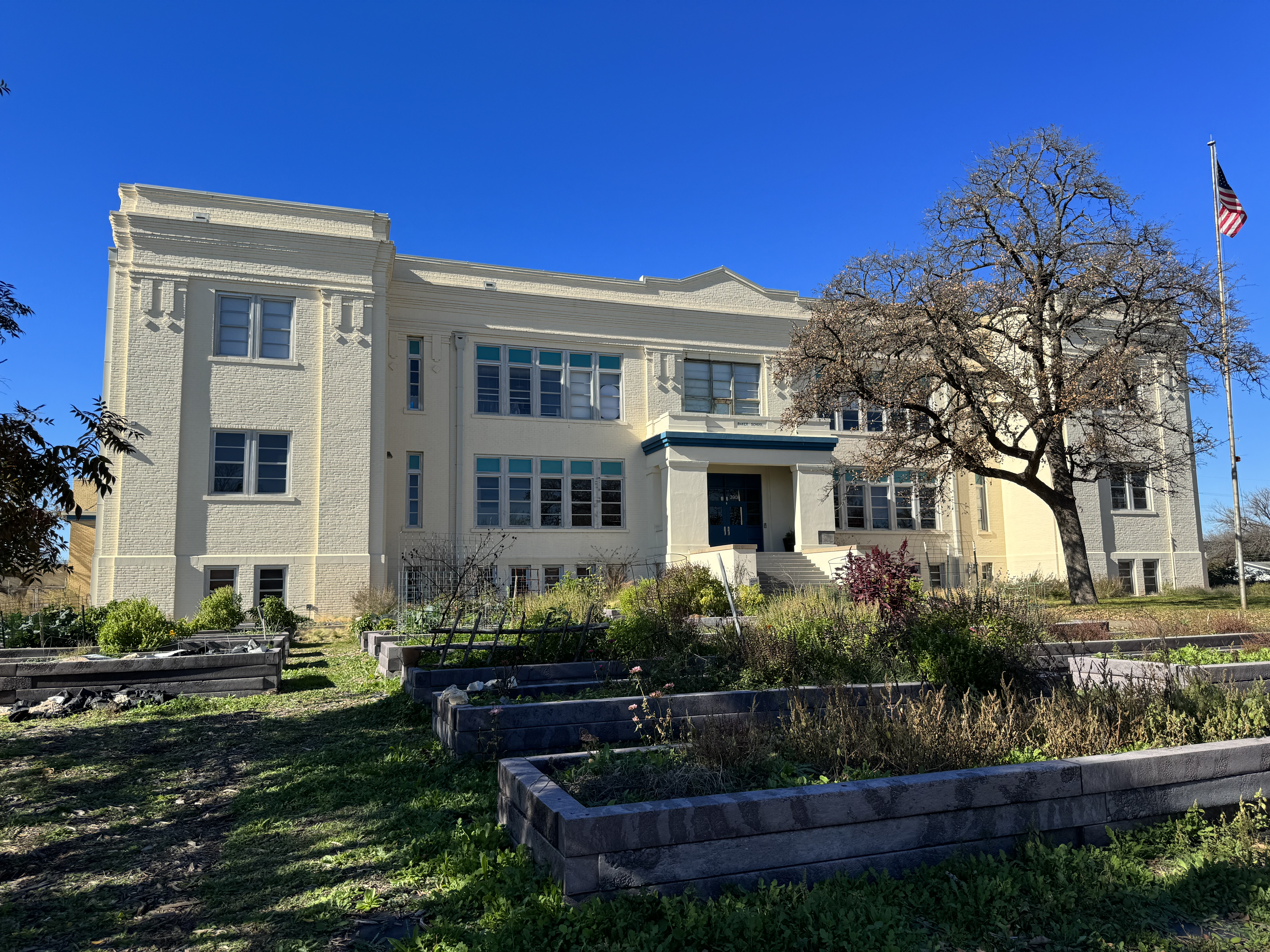
- The Baker Center in 2023

- Location within Texas Location within the United States
- Coordinates: 30°18′15″N 97°44′09″W
- Built: 1911
- Architect: Endress & Walsh
- NRHP reference No.: 100009490
- Added to NRHP: October 27, 2023

The Baker Center, previously the Baker School, Baker Junior High School, and W. R. Robbins High School, is an historic building in the Hyde Park neighborhood of Austin, Texas. It has been, in sequential order, an elementary school, a middle school, an alternative high school, and an administrative building for Austin ISD. In 2018, the Baker Center was bought by Tim and Karrie League, founders of Alamo Drafthouse, and it is now a property they rent to tenants.

It has been used as a filming location for the TV shows Friday Night Lights and Walker, and the movie Lousy Carter.

As of October 27, 2023, the Baker Center is on the National Register of Historic Places for its significance in educational and architectural history.

== History ==
=== Baker School ===
When it was built in 1911, the Baker School replaced the original Hyde Park School, which was established by Monroe Shipe, after Hyde Park School was unable to accommodate the neighborhood's growing population.

It was identical to the Fulmore Middle School in South Austin, which would later become Lively Middle School.

The Baker School was designed by the architectural firm Endress & Walsh and their associate Roy L. Thomas.

The school was dedicated on November 28, 1911, as a segregated elementary school for white children living in Hyde Park. It is named for DeWitt Clinton Baker, who was the treasurer of the Austin Library Association in 1875.

Additions to Baker School were built in 1924, by city planner and architect Franz Hugo Kuehne, and in 1939 by the firm Kriesle and Brooks.

=== Baker Junior High School ===
In the late 1930s, federal aid was lent to the school, which was used to create a large rear addition. As a result of the expansion, the school now served elementary and middle school-aged pupils. The district then renamed the school to reflect this.

Baker Junior High School was renovated in 1958 and 1961 in an effort to modernize the building, as well as to accommodate the growing population of Hyde Park. The school's "Band Building" was established during the renovations.

=== W. R. Robbins High School ===
The Baker Junior High School was converted into an Alternative High School in 1980, on account of there being a lack of children to attend the school. W. R. Robbins closed in 1995.

=== Austin ISD building ===
After the closing of W. R. Robbins, the school became the administrative headquarters for Austin ISD.

During this period, the building was used as a filming location for the TV shows, "Friday Night Lights" and "Walker, Texas Red", as a school in both cases.

In 2016, in the wake of budget cuts, the district put the Baker School on the real estate market. They had previously suggested selling the school in 2011.

Austin ISD asked that any buyers use the building for educational purposes.

In 2017, the school's gymnasium was converted into an art venue named the "Rosette". It has been used primarily as a performance space for Austin Classical Guitar.

=== Alamo Drafthouse Headquarters ===
Tim and Karrie League, owners of Alamo Drafthouse, bought the Baker Center in 2017 for $10.6 million. As a result of private equity partners not wanting Alamo Drafthouse to formally purchase the building, the Leagues agreed to purchase it with their own money and allow Alamo Drafthouse to be the Baker Center's main tenant.

The Leagues said they would use it as their corporate headquarters, but that they would also create affordable housing for public school teachers on the property. Specifically, they planned to use the one acre lot on the western side of the building, called the "Baker Field". They promised it would not be "just a development project".

Tim League has said that the Baker Center solved what he referred to as "the Alamo problem". Alamo Drafthouse had lacked sufficient office space for years and had desired to expand their operations. In spite of the Baker Center being "twice the size of anything [they were] looking for", they purchased the building because of its history and uniqueness.

Concerns were raised over Alamo Drafthouse winning the auction, as other bidders had spent millions more on their bids. ColinaWest Real Estate owner David Kahn sued Austin ISD, alleging that they had violated proper vetting processes by not going with one of the higher bids made. Kahn would later withdraw his lawsuit.

Alamo Drafthouse has yet to build the affordable housing for teachers. According to lead architect Richard Weiss, the city took the Baker Field, which they want to use as a detention pond.

In one of the building's former classrooms, wax figures of Amish men and women sit at desks. These figures originate from a museum in Pennsylvania, which Alamo Drafthouse co-owner Tim League had purchased. Following the purchase, League was unsure of where to store these figures, and decided to keep them in the Baker Center.

In 2020, Alamo Drafthouse sought NRHP status for the Baker Center. It was added to the register in October 2023, which allotted the company a tax credit.

In 2021, the film Lousy Carter conducted most of its filming at the Baker Center. The film was shown inside The Rosette on March 31, 2024.

Following Sony's acquisition of Alamo Drafthouse in 2024, Alamo scaled down their presence from two floors, to half of one floor. As a result, they allowed tenants to rent the floors they formerly occupied. There are now 30 tenants, including the League of Women Voters, Travis Audubon Society, wine and holiday markets, interior designers, a photography studio, architectural firms, a coffee shop called Terrible Love, the Texas Archive of the Moving Image, the American Genre Film Archive, the Press Room, Save the Good Stuff, Austin Classical Guitar and a community garden.

Terrible Love was originally a nearby coffee trailer, but tenant Studio Balcones built them a patio for their business. However, Terrible Love would then go on to occupy a refurnished boiler room in the community garden, leaving the patio to become a third place for visitors to the Baker Center.

The community garden is a passion project of co-owner Karrie League. Although originally intended only for tenants, it is now also used by neighbors.

== See also ==
- National Register of Historic Places listings in Travis County, Texas
