= Jonathan Togo =

American actor (born 1977)

- Born: Jonathan Frederick Togo; August 25, 1977 (age 48); Rockland, Massachusetts, US
- Occupation: Actor
- Years active: 2001–present
- Notable work: CSI: Miami
- Spouses: Diora Baird (m. 2013; div. 2016) Tiffany Baker (m. 2019)
- Children: 2

Jonathan Frederick Togo (born August 25, 1977) is an American actor, best known for his role in CSI: Miami as Ryan Wolfe.

== Early life ==
Togo was born in Rockland, Massachusetts, the son of Sheila, a housewife and former visual merchandiser and Michael Togo, a commercial artist and graphic designer who previously worked for the Boston Globe. Sheila Togo runs Simply Sheila, a booth at the SoWa Open Market in Boston.

Togo's mother is of Italian and Irish descent, and his father is Jewish. The original surname, "Tonkaviev", was shortened by a forefather who wanted something snappier for his carpet business.

He attended Hebrew school as a child and graduated from Rockland High School in 1995, where he was a wrestler. He attended the Project Contemporary Competitiveness, Advanced Study Program (a.k.a. PCC ASP) as a student in 1991 and 1992, then worked as a proctor in 1996.

He attended Vassar College, graduating with an A.B. in theater. He studied at the National Theater Institute of the Eugene O’Neill Theater.

While at Vassar, Togo was classmates with future Bravery singer/songwriter Sam Endicott and keyboardist John Conway. The three played in various bands together in the Poughkeepsie area.

== Career ==
Togo has performed and participated in numerous plays, including Our Country's Good. While he is most famous for his role as Ryan Wolfe in CSI: Miami, he has other TV show credits including a starring role in Special Unit 2, as well as appearances in Judging Amy. He also played a store clerk in Mystic River.

In 2008, Togo wrote and directed a web series, My Best Friend Is My Penis, for Atom.com.

Togo also starred in the web series Casted: The Continuing Chronicles of Derek Riffchyn, Greatest Casting Director in the World. Ever, playing the lead role of Derek: a sassy, somewhat abusive, and extremely crass casting director. Togo's real-life best friend Justin Long plays his assistant, Scott. In 2010, Togo signed on to play twin brothers Richard and Mark (who fall in love with the same woman), in the movie Identical.

In September 2013, it was announced that Togo would be part of the cast in the fourth season of Covert Affairs.

== Personal life ==
Togo was married to actress Diora Baird from 2013 to 2016; they have one child. He then married writer Tiffany Baker on January 17, 2019. In March 2021, Baker gave birth to their first child, a daughter.

== Filmography ==
=== Film ===
Year	Title	Role	Notes
2003	Mystic River	Pete	
2011	Identical	Mark / Rich Washington	
2012	Somebody Up There Likes Me	Adult Lyle	
2014	A Hundred Eighty Degrees	Nick	Short film
2015	7 Chinese Brothers	Don	
2015	A Rising Tide	Roger	
2017	Infinity Baby	Intern	

=== Television ===
Year	Title	Role	Notes
2001–2002	Special Unit 2	Jonathan	12 episodes
2003	Judging Amy	Charles "DJ Dizz" Simbour	Episode: "Looking for Quarters"
2003	Law & Order	Eddie	Episode: "Blaze"
2003	Ed	Keith Kessler	Episode: "The Offer"
2004	The Jury	Dennis Dudley	Episode: "The Honeymoon Suite"
2004–2012	CSI: Miami	Ryan Wolfe	Main role (seasons 3–10); 182 episodes
2012	Harry's Law	Randy Hessly	Episode: "Breaking Points"
2013	Covert Affairs	Nelson Smith	2 episodes
2015	Ex-Best	Frank	Episode: "Episode 10"
2016	Angel from Hell	Gavin	2 episodes
2017	Lucifer	Anthony Annan	Episode: "Candy Morningstar"
2017	Teachers	Handsome Preppie	Episode: "Dire Straights"
2018	Christmas Cupid's Arrow	David Martin	Television film; also known as The Christmas Cupid
2025	The Chosen	Malchus	6 episodes
2025	Countdown	Damon Drew	4 episodes
