= Martin Starr =

American actor (born 1982)

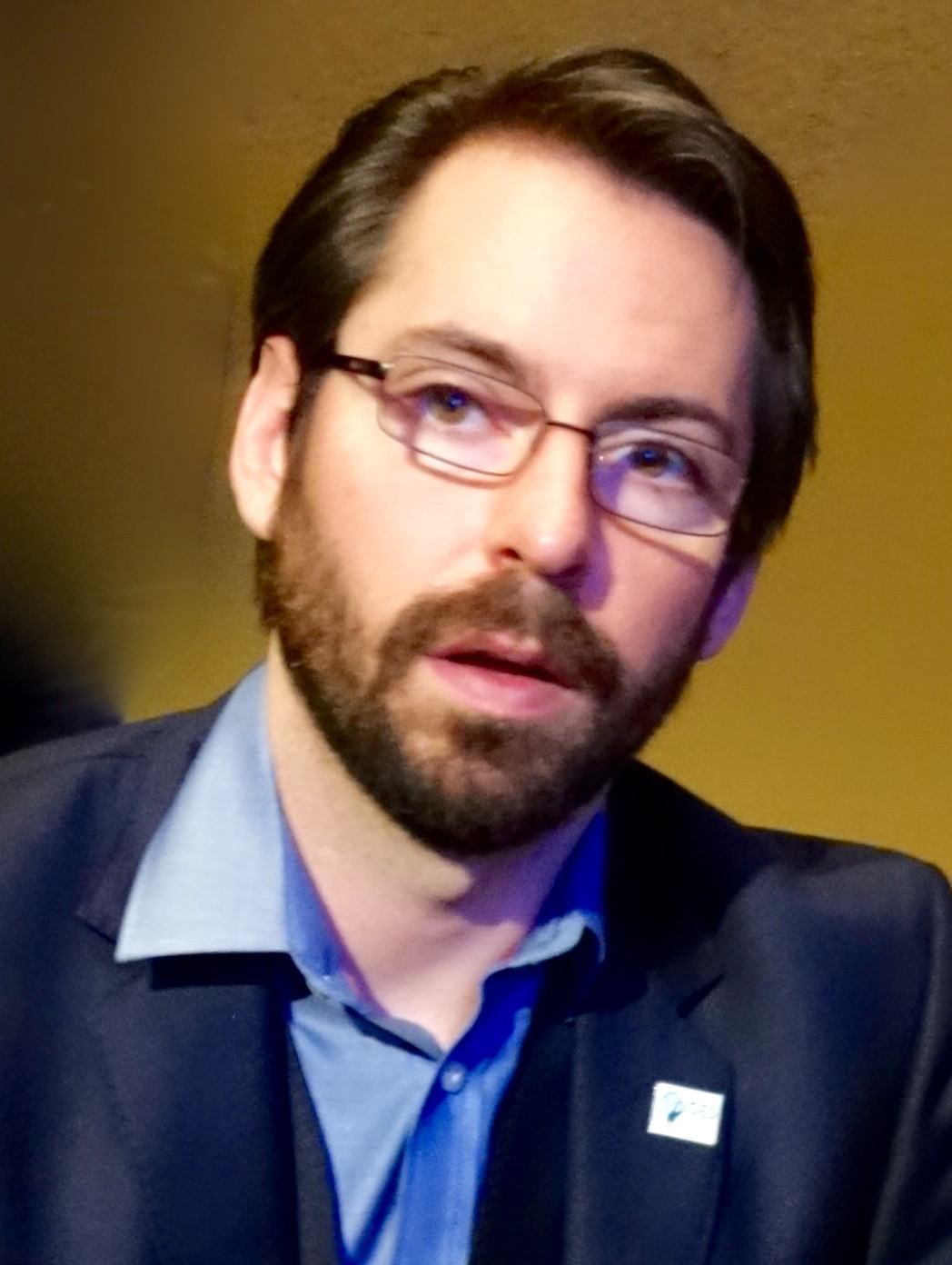
- Starr in 2016
- Born: Martin James Pflieger Schienle; July 30, 1982 (age 44); Santa Monica, California, U.S.
- Occupation: Actor
- Years active: 1992–present
- Spouse: Alex Gehring (m. 2024)

Martin James Pflieger Schienle (born July 30, 1982), known professionally as Martin Starr, is an American actor. He is known for the television roles of Bill Haverchuck on the comedy drama Freaks and Geeks (1999–2000), Roman DeBeers on the comedy series Party Down (2009–2010, 2023), Bertram Gilfoyle on the HBO series Silicon Valley (2014–2019), for his film roles in Knocked Up (2007) and Adventureland (2009), and as Roger Harrington in the Marvel Cinematic Universe films The Incredible Hulk (2008), Spider-Man: Homecoming (2017), Spider-Man: Far From Home (2019), and Spider-Man: No Way Home (2021). Starr has appeared in all four seasons of the crime/MOB sitcom Tulsa King.

== Personal life ==
Starr was born in Santa Monica, California, the son of actress Jean St. James (née Pflieger), and James Erwin Schienle, who was an instructor at Pasco-Hernando Community College. He was raised Buddhist. In an interview with Wired, Starr said that he felt "frustrated and depressed" at 22 due to lack of offers in the years after Freaks and Geeks was cancelled. He had fired his agent and decided to quit acting altogether; however, a few years later he was offered Knocked Up, and other offers then started to come his way. In May 2024, Starr married Alex Gehring, the bassist of the band Ringo Deathstarr.

== Career ==
In 1999, Starr was cast as Bill Haverchuck in the NBC sitcom Freaks and Geeks. The series received positive reviews from critics, but it suffered from low ratings and was canceled after only one season. It has since gained a strong cult following. Starr then had a number of guest appearances and one-time roles on shows such as Ed, Mysterious Ways, Providence, King of the Hill, and Normal, Ohio. He had a small recurring role during the third season of Roswell as the character Monk. In 2002, Starr appeared in the films Stealing Harvard and Cheats. He reunited with both Freaks and Geeks producer Judd Apatow and Freaks and Geeks co-star Seth Rogen when he made a guest appearance on Apatow's situational comedy Undeclared in the episode "The Perfect Date". In 2005, he appeared in the miniseries Revelations and the CBS sitcom How I Met Your Mother.

Starr co-starred in the 2007 comedy film Knocked Up, which was directed by Judd Apatow. The same year, he had small appearances in Superbad and Walk Hard: The Dewey Cox Story, both of which were produced by Apatow. Knocked Up was critically praised and was successful at the box office. The success of Knocked Up led to Starr having larger roles in films, such as Good Dick and Adventureland. Starr also appears in many well-received short films that premiere at film festivals, such as the Sundance Film Festival.

In 2008, Starr played a minor role in The Incredible Hulk. He reprised the role, retroactively identified as Roger Harrington, in Spider-Man: Homecoming (2017), Spider-Man: Far From Home (2019) and Spider-Man: No Way Home (2021).

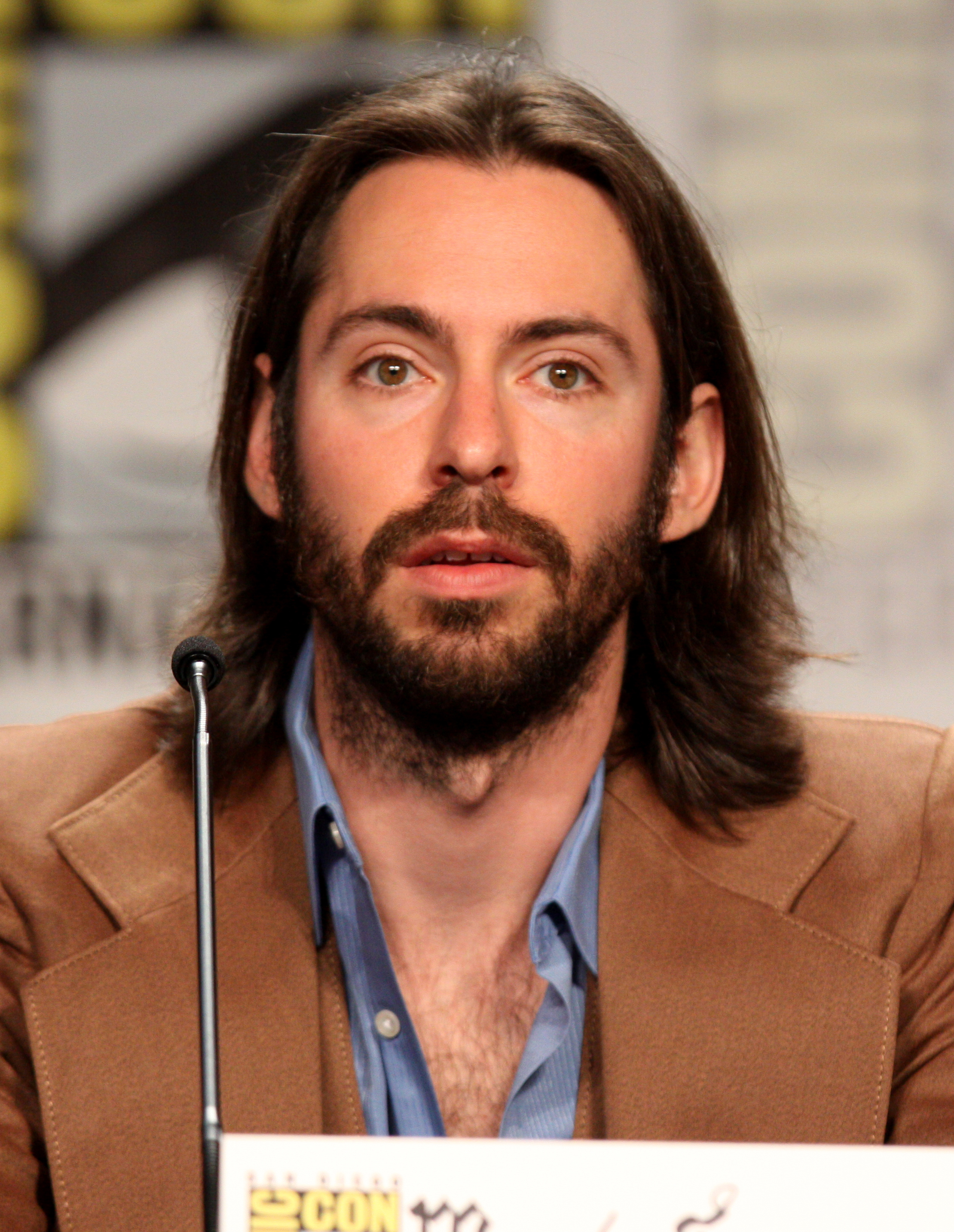
Starr at the July 2011 San Diego Comic-Con

From 2009 to 2010, Starr was a series regular portraying Roman DeBeers on the Starz sitcom Party Down. The series was cancelled after two seasons and there were discussions of adapting the series into film, but this never came to fruition. From 2011 to 2013, he co-starred on the Adult Swim television series NTSF:SD:SUV::, in which he played Sam Stern. In 2011, Starr had a major role in the film A Good Old Fashioned Orgy and also had guest appearances on television series such as Mad Love, Community, and Childrens Hospital. In the latter, he reprised his role of Roman DeBeers from Party Down. Starr reunited with Freaks and Geeks and Party Down cast member Lizzy Caplan in the 2012 film Save the Date, which premiered at the Sundance Film Festival. The same year, he had a supporting role in the thriller film Deep Dark Canyon, as well as guest-starring on sitcoms Parks and Recreation and New Girl.

In 2013, he had a small role playing himself in This Is the End, which was directed by Seth Rogen and Evan Goldberg. He had a starring role in the Kristen Bell film The Lifeguard, later working with her again in the film Veronica Mars. He has guest-starred on The Aquabats! Super Show!, Franklin & Bash, and Drunk History. In 2014, he was cast to play Bertram Gilfoyle in the HBO comedy Silicon Valley.

In 2019, Party Down's co-creator and producer Dan Etheridge announced plans for a reunion with the original cast (including Starr) during a discussion at Vulture Festival. The third season of the series premiered in February 2023. In 2022, he joined the cast for Tulsa King, playing the role of Lawrence "Bodhi" Geigerman, the owner of a weed store.

In 2025, Starr founded the candy company Sweet Stash with Adeev and Ezra Potash; the company produces gummies in the shape of musical notes.

== Filmography ==
=== Film ===
Year	Title	Role	Notes
1992	Hero	Allen in Coma	Credited as Martin Schienle
1995	Xtro 3: Watch the Skies	Biff Atkins	Credited as Martin Schienle
2001	Eyeball Eddie	Eddie Malick	Short film
2001	Robbie's Brother	Wayne	
2002	Stealing Harvard	Liquor Store Clerk	
2002	Cheats	Applebee	
2003	Band Camp	Shane	Short film
2004	Who's Your Daddy?	Scooter	Direct-to-video
2004	Fish Burglars	Marty	Short film
2005	The Toast	No Friend of the Groom	
2005	Kicking & Screaming	Beantown Customer	
2006	American Storage	Charlie	Short film
2006	A Midsummer Night's Rewrite	John	Short film
2007	Knocked Up	Martin	
2007	Superbad	James Masselin	
2007	Walk Hard: The Dewey Cox Story	Schmendrick	
2008	Good Dick	Simon	
2008	The Incredible Hulk	Roger Harrington	Cameo; Credited as "Computer Nerd"
2009	Big Breaks	Barista	Short film
2009	Adventureland	Joel	
2009	Oh Joy	Best Friend	Short film
2009	The Toll Road	Stewart	Short film
2009	The Invention of Lying	Waiter #1	Cameo
2009	The Last Lovecraft: Relic of Cthulhu	Clarence	
2009	1-900-Drinking-Buddy	Young Jock	Short film
2009	Paper Heart	Himself	
2010	Church & State	Jesus	Short film
2010	Lovepocalypse	Ernie	Short film
2011	A Good Old Fashioned Orgy	Doug Duquez	
2011	Fight for Your Right: Revisited	Police	Short film
2011	6 Month Rule	Alan	
2012	Save the Date	Andrew	
2012	Angel of Death	Victim 3	Short film
2012	Deep Dark Canyon	Lloyd Cavanaugh	
2013	This Is the End	Himself	Cameo
2013	The Sidekick	Blood Diamond	Short film
2013	The Lifeguard	Todd	
2013	The Apocalypse	Kyle	Short film
2013	Seasick Sailor	Bookbinder	Short film
2014	Dead Snow 2: Red vs. Dead	Daniel	
2014	Veronica Mars	Stu "Cobb" Cobbler	
2014	Leonard in Slow Motion	Leonard	Short film
2014	Amira & Sam	Sam Seneca	
2014	Playing It Cool	Lyle	
2015	I'll See You in My Dreams	Lloyd	
2015	Intruders	Perry Cuttner	
2016	Operator	Joe Larsen	Also co-producer
2017	Lemon	Adam	
2017	Infinity Baby	Malcolm	
2017	Grow House	Conspiracy Chris	
2017	Spider-Man: Homecoming	Roger Harrington	
2018	The Escape of Prisoner 614	Jim Doyle	
2019	Frances Ferguson	Mel	
2019	Honey Boy	Alec	
2019	Spider-Man: Far From Home	Roger Harrington	
2021	Spider-Man: No Way Home	Roger Harrington	
2022	Beavis and Butt-Head Do the Universe	Corrections Officer / Ball-kicking Biker (voice)	
2022	Samaritan	Albert Casier	
2023	There's Something in the Barn	Bill Nordheim	
2023	Lousy Carter	Kaminsky	
2025	The Hand That Rocks the Cradle	Stewart	

=== Television ===
Year	Title	Role	Notes
1999	G vs. E		Episode: "Cougar Pines"
1999–2000	Freaks and Geeks	Bill Haverchuck	18 episodes
2000	Normal, Ohio	Howie the Electronics Store Manager	Episode: "Working Girl"
2001	Ed	Clark Salinger	Episode: "Exceptions"
2001	Mysterious Ways	Dwayne Banbury	Episode: "One of Us"
2001–2002	Roswell	Monk Pyle	3 episodes
2002	Undeclared	Theo	Episode: "The Perfect Date"
2002	Providence		Episode: "Truth and Consequences"
2003	King of the Hill	Andrew/Tommy (voice)	Episode: "I Never Promised You an Organic Garden"
2005	Revelations	Rubio	5 episodes
2005	How I Met Your Mother	Kevin	Episode: "The Duel"
2006	Clark and Michael	Burger Stand Employee	1 episode
2007	Wainy Days	Sketchy Laborer #1	Episode: "Tough Guy"
2009–2010, 2023	Party Down	Roman DeBeers	26 episodes
2010	Yo Gabba Gabba!	Himself	Episode: "Flying"
2010–2016	Hawaii Five-0	Adam 'Toast' Charles	4 episodes
2010	The League	Stu "Box of Frogs" Pompeu	Episode: "High School Reunion"
2011	Mad Love	Clyde	Episodes: "Friends and Other Obstacles", "Baby, You Can Drive My Car"
2011	Community	Professor Cligoris	Episode: "Geography of Global Conflict"
2011	Childrens Hospital	Roman DeBeers	Episode: "Party Down"
2011–2013	NTSF:SD:SUV::	Sam	31 episodes
2012	Parks and Recreation	Kevin	Episode: "Operation Ann"
2012	New Girl	Dirk	Episode: "Fancyman: Part 2"
2012	Christine	Oz	2 episodes
2013	The Aquabats! Super Show!	Shred Center M.C.	Episode: "The AntiBats!"
2013	Franklin & Bash	Wendell Singletary	Episode: "By the Numbers"
2013	Burning Love	Leo	11 episodes
2013–2019	Drunk History	Various	5 episodes
2014	The Goldbergs	Andre	Episode: "The Other Smother"
2014–2019	Silicon Valley	Bertram Gilfoyle	53 episodes
2014	Newsreaders	Philip Baker	Episode: "America's Unknown President; Reporter on House Arrest"
2015	Married	Judah	Episode: "Murder!"
2015	Kirby Buckets	The Claude	Episode: "Failure to Launch"
2015–2019	Life in Pieces	Oscar	5 episodes
2017	Bill Nye Saves the World	Doug the Caveman	Episode: "This Diet is Bananas"
2017	Future Man	Lyle Karofsky	Episode: "A Fuel's Errand"
2018	Robot Chicken	Various voices	Episode: "Factory Where Nuts Are Handled"
2019	Game of Thrones	Ironborn soldier	Episode: "Winterfell"; Cameo
2019	Schooled	Andre	Episode: "The Pokémon Society"
2019–2020	Tacoma FD	Tothar	2 episodes
2022	Beavis and Butt-Head	Man (voice)	Episode: "Roof/River"
2022–present	Tulsa King	Lawrence "Bodhi" Geigerman	Main role
2022	Guillermo del Toro's Cabinet of Curiosities	Keith	Episode: "The Outside"
2023	Hailey's On It!	Cody (voice)	Episode: "Escape Doom"
2023	Vivant	Sam	Japanese TV series
2025	Sausage Party: Foodtopia	Sherman	Voice, main role

=== Web ===
Year	Title	Role	Notes
2011	Madeon - Pop Culture (Dance Video)	Boombox Guy	YouTube Video
2012	Dating Rules from My Future Self	Vincent	4 episodes
