= Nick Offerman =

American actor (born 1970)

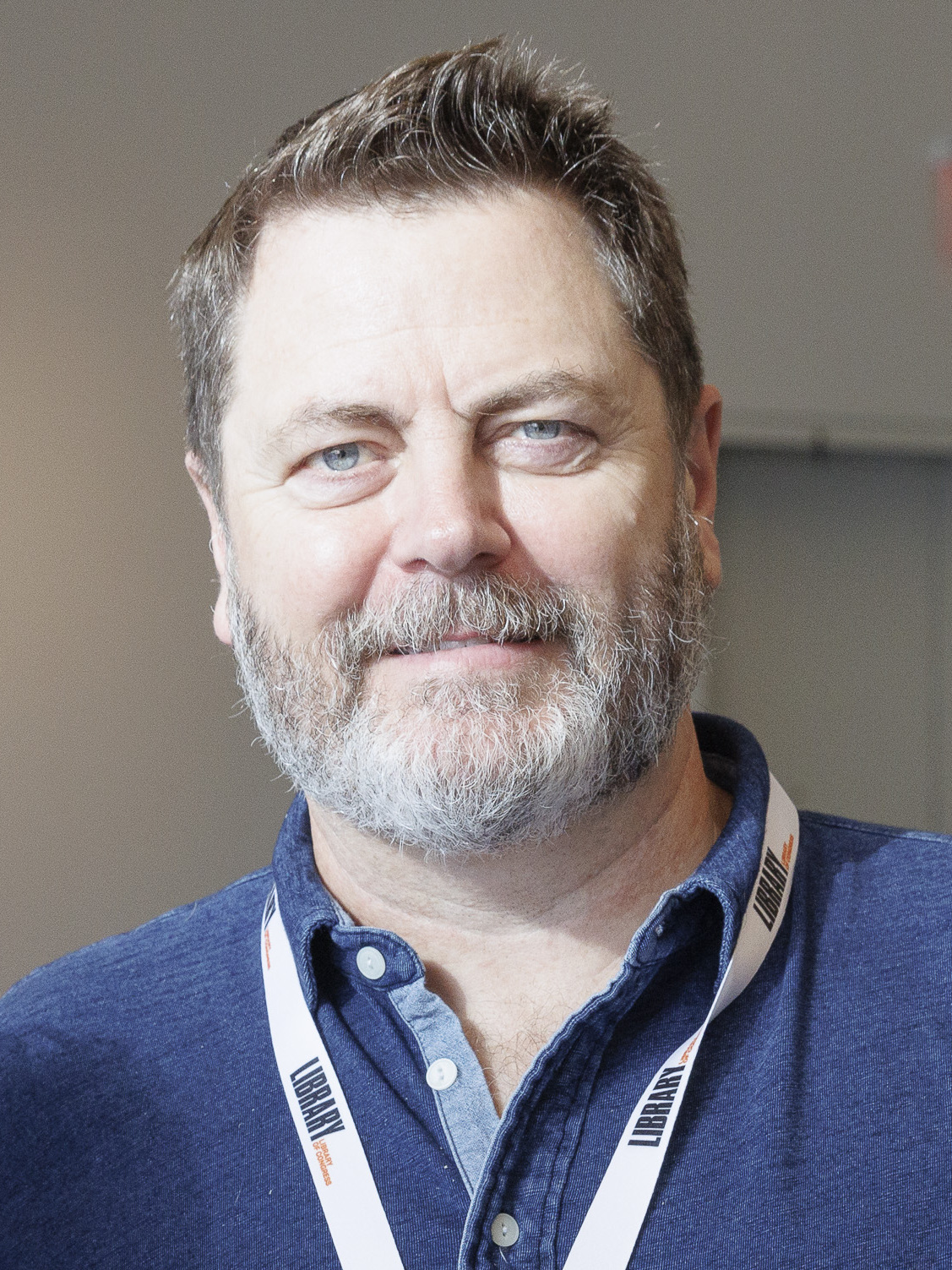
- Offerman in 2022
- Born: Nicholas David Offerman; June 26, 1970 (age 56); Joliet, Illinois, U.S.
- Education: University of Illinois Urbana-Champaign (BFA)
- Occupations: Actor; comedian; carpenter; writer
- Years active: 1992–present
- Spouse: Megan Mullally (m. 2003)
- Website: nickofferman.co

Nicholas David Offerman (born June 26, 1970) is an American actor, comedian, carpenter, and writer. He became known for his role as Ron Swanson in the NBC sitcom Parks and Recreation (2009–2015), for which he received the Television Critics Association Award for Individual Achievement in Comedy and was twice nominated for the Critics' Choice Television Award for Best Supporting Actor in a Comedy Series.

Offerman appeared in the second season of the FX crime series Fargo (2015), for which he received a nomination for the Critics' Choice Television Award, as well as the FX on Hulu miniseries Pam & Tommy (2022) and the HBO drama series The Last of Us (2023), for which he won the Primetime Emmy Award for Outstanding Guest Actor in a Drama Series. He was Emmy-nominated for playing Chester A. Arthur in the Netflix limited series Death by Lightning (2025) and a former wrestler and addict in the Apple TV dramedy series Margo's Got Money Troubles (2026).

He has acted in numerous films The Kings of Summer (2013), Me and Earl and the Dying Girl (2015), The Founder (2016), The House of Tomorrow (2017), Hearts Beat Loud (2018), Civil War (2024), and Mission: Impossible – The Final Reckoning (2025). He voiced Agent Powers on Gravity Falls (2014–2015) and voice roles in The Lego Movie franchise (2014–present), Hotel Transylvania 2 (2015), Ice Age: Collision Course (2016), the Sing franchise (2016–present), Smurfs (2025), The Pout-Pout Fish (2026) and Sonic the Hedgehog 4 (upcoming 2027). He hosted Have a Good Trip: Adventures in Psychedelics (2020).

He began co-hosting the NBC reality competition series Making It (2018–2021) with Parks and Recreation co-star Amy Poehler; the duo received three nominations for the Primetime Emmy Award for Outstanding Host for a Reality or Competition Program.

== Early life and education ==
Nicholas David Offerman was born in Joliet, Illinois, on June 26, 1970, the son of nurse Cathy (née Roberts) and social studies teacher Ric Offerman. His father taught at a high school in Minooka. Offerman was raised Catholic in nearby Minooka, where he attended Minooka Community High School. He received a BFA from the University of Illinois Urbana–Champaign in 1993. That year, he and a group of fellow students co-founded the Chicago theatre company Defiant Theatre. His parents were initially bewildered by his desire to become an actor, stating "It was bizarre to them... Nobody in our town had ever gone into the arts. So when I said: 'I think I want to be an actor', everybody kind of shook their head and said, 'I don't think you can get there from here.'"

== Career ==
=== 1997–2008: Early work and acting roles ===
Offerman lived in Chicago in the mid-1990s, where he participated with theater companies such as Steppenwolf, Goodman, and Wisdom Bridge. At Steppenwolf, he also worked as a fight choreographer and master carpenter, having been trained in carpentry by his father. During this time, Offerman became acquainted with Amy Poehler, who was heavily involved with the Chicago improv comedy scene. Offerman appeared briefly as a construction worker in City of Angels (1998) and in other films such as November (2004), Cursed (2005), Miss Congeniality 2: Armed and Fabulous (2005), Sin City (2005), The Men Who Stare at Goats (2009).

In 2003, he married actress Megan Mullally. Offerman has appeared on her talk show, The Megan Mullally Show. At the same time, he began appearing on television as a plumber on Will & Grace on its fourth season's Thanksgiving episode, on The King of Queens, in three episodes of 24, and in an episode of The West Wing. Prior to Parks and Recreation, his most prominent role was as a factory worker and Benny Lopez's love interest Randy McGee on George Lopez. He appeared twice on Gilmore Girls, in 2003's "The Festival of Living Art" and 2005's "Always a Godmother, Never a God" and in the third-season episode of Monk, "Mr. Monk and the Election" as a helper for the campaign of Natalie Teeger. In 2007, Offerman co-starred in the Comedy Central series American Body Shop.

=== 2009–2015: Breakthrough with Parks and Recreation ===
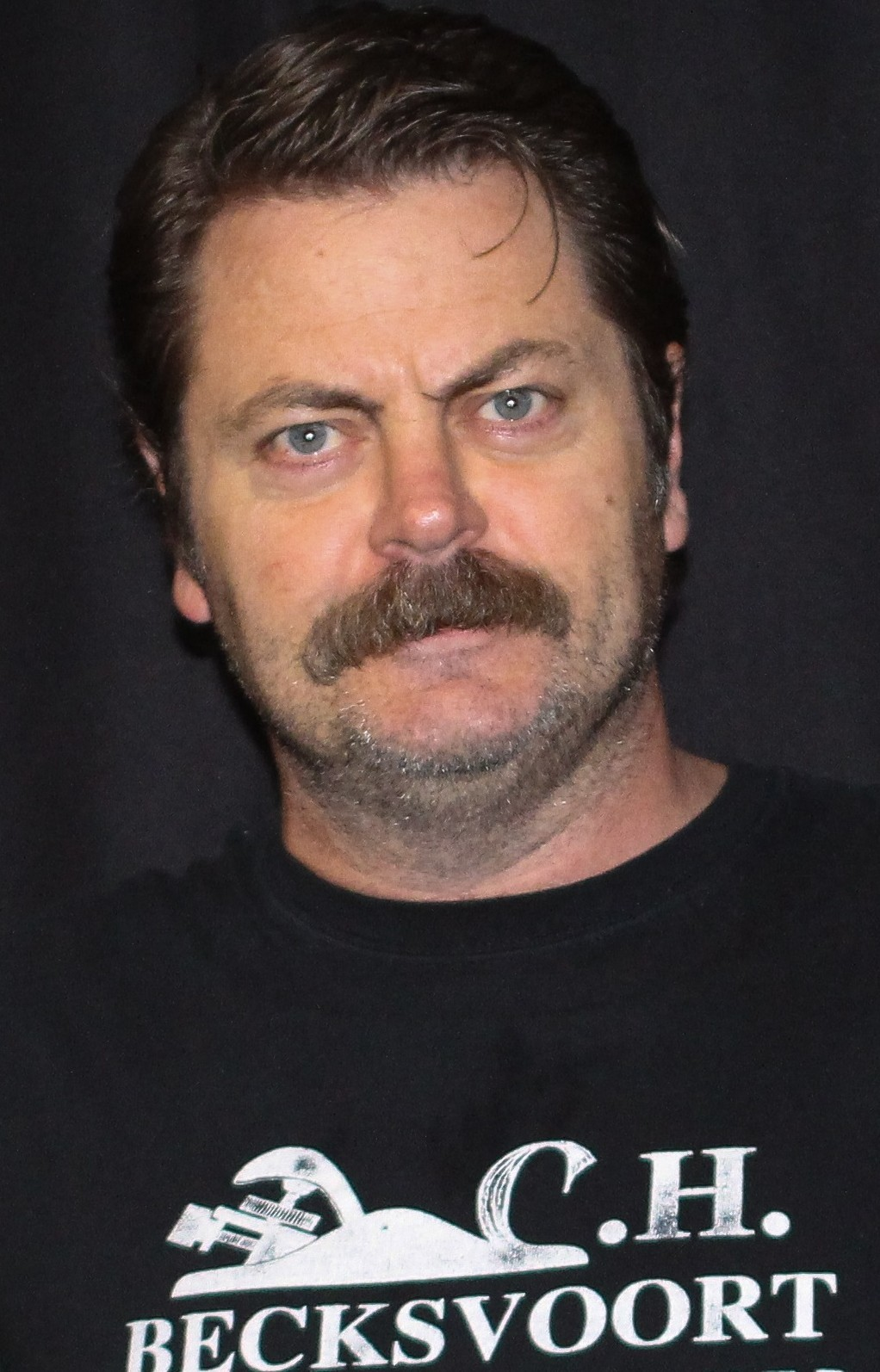
Offerman visiting the campus of University of Maryland Baltimore County in 2013

In 2009, The Office producers Michael Schur and Greg Daniels offered Offerman a series regular role in their NBC sitcom Parks and Recreation for the character Ron Swanson, the deadpan, government-hating, libertarian head of a city parks department and boss of Amy Poehler's character Leslie Knope. Slate magazine declared Offerman "Parks and Recreation's secret weapon", and said he regularly stole scenes and "has a gift for understated physical comedy." The role weaves antagonism and political philosophy with humanity, while the intense libertarian philosophy the character lives out is often played off against the equally intense social liberalism and "do-gooder" mentality of Poehler's character. Offerman said that supporting parts such as that of Parks and Recreation are his ideal roles, and that he draws particular inspiration from Reverend Jim Ignatowski, the character played by Christopher Lloyd in the sitcom Taxi.

Offerman has been featured in the Adult Swim series Childrens Hospital. He is the voice of Axe Cop in the animated series of the same name that premiered on July 27, 2013. In the same year, Offerman portrayed Johnny Cool in the "Boston" episode of Derek Waters' Drunk History on Comedy Central. In 2014, he portrayed a lovesick German talk show host in The Decemberists' video "Make You Better". The same year, he appeared in a short film The Gunfighter directed by Eric Kissack. Offerman played the role of the narrator of the film where the actors of the film break the fourth wall and are able to hear the narrator.

In 2012, had two film roles, as 21 Jump Street's Deputy Chief Hardy and in Casa de Mi Padre as DEA Agent Parker. He reprised his role as Deputy Chief Hardy in 22 Jump Street two years later. He starred in and produced an independent film, Somebody Up There Likes Me (2012), shot in Austin, Texas. He appeared in the 2013 comedy The Kings of Summer (2013), and We're the Millers, and voiced MetalBeard in The Lego Movie. Offerman conceived of and starred in punk band FIDLAR's 2013 video for their song "Cocaine". Offerman played an alcoholic college guidance counselor in Believe Me. In 2014, Offerman and Mullally starred together in the off-Broadway one-act play, Annapurna. The two play an estranged couple that reunites one last time. In 2015, Offerman starred as Ignatius J. Reilly in a theatrical adaptation of A Confederacy of Dunces with the Huntington Theatre Company. Offerman played the recurring role Karl Weathers in the second season of Fargo (2015). Offerman voiced Grandpa Mike alongside wife Megan Mullally who voiced Grandma Linda in Hotel Transylvania 2 (2015).

=== 2016–present: Career expansion ===
He portrayed the first establisher of McDonald's, Dick McDonald, in The Founder (2016). In 2017, Offerman launched his Full Bush Tour which consisted of 28 shows across the U.S. and Canada. His All Rise Tour kicked off on July 20, 2019, in Thackerville and continued through the rest of 2019, hitting major cities: Chicago, San Francisco, Washington DC, Philadelphia, New York, Detroit, and Atlanta. Offerman starred in alternative rock band They Might Be Giants' 2018 video for their song "The Greatest". In 2023, Offerman appeared in "Long, Long Time", the third episode of the HBO series The Last of Us as Bill. His performance, along with that of his co-star Murray Bartlett, was critically acclaimed, with some critics naming it a career-best performance, and Dais Johnston of Inverse labelled them as "Emmy-worthy". He won Guest Actor in a Drama Series at the 2023 Creative Arts Emmy Awards.

In 2025, Offerman starred with Jacob Tremblay and Dennis Quaid in the crime thriller Sovereign. Offerman was the Show Announcer for the 97th Academy Awards. He appeared in the 2025 film Mission: Impossible – The Final Reckoning.

== Other ventures ==
=== Writing ===
Offerman has authored several books, most of which he has also narrated as audiobooks:

- Paddle Your Own Canoe: One Man's Fundamentals for Delicious Living (2013) – autobiographical with elements of career/self-help advice
- Gumption: Relighting the Torch of Freedom with America's Gutsiest Troublemakers (2015) – discusses influential U.S. figures
- Good Clean Fun: Misadventures in Sawdust at Offerman Woodshop (2016) – focuses on woodworking
- The Greatest Love Story Ever Told: An Oral History (2018) – chronicle of Offerman's relationship with Megan Mullally
- All Rise: Audio Perambulation (2020) – audiobook exclusive released during the COVID-19 pandemic
- Where the Deer and the Antelope Play: The Pastoral Observations of One Ignorant American Who Loves to Walk Outside (2021) – commentary related to nature, accompanied by personal anecdotes
- Little Woodchucks: Offerman Woodshop's Guide to Tools and Tomfoolery (2025) – an offering of family friendly woodworking projects

=== Woodworking ===
Offerman has run the Offerman Woodshop with a crew of six craftsmen and women in Los Angeles since 2001. He has said that acting in TV and movies is "cramping my style at the woodshop" and "if I just had a life of woodworking and live theater, that'd be perfectly fine with me". He educated himself about woodworking with books and periodicals and has written several books about woodworking. He emphasizes that literature about the craft tends to be too somber and sober and actually it's important to know going in that you're supposed to make mistakes.

=== Freemasonry ===
Offerman confirmed his membership as a freemason during a 2020 interview with Wired Magazine. He has written about his fascination with freemasonry in his book Gumption. He has since been featured in masonic articles, including the Scottish Rite.

== Personal life ==
=== Marriage ===
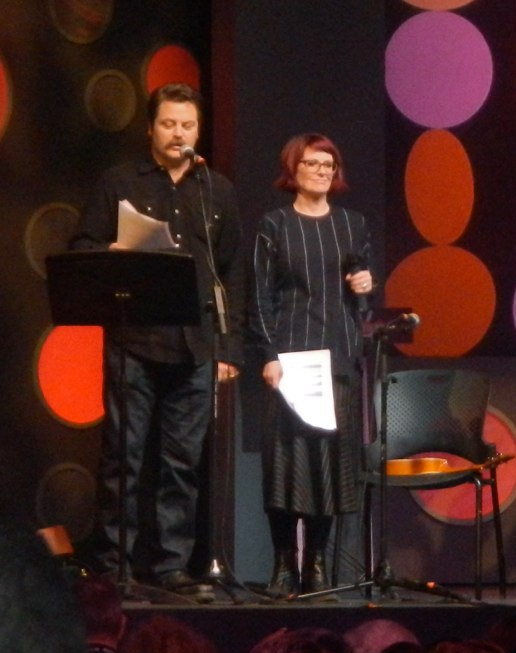
Offerman and Megan Mullally hosting the 2014 Sundance Film Festival awards ceremony

Offerman married actress Megan Mullally on September 20, 2003. They met while they were in the play The Berlin Circle with the Evidence Room Theatre Company in the summer of 2000. They have worked together on series and films such as Will & Grace, Parks and Recreation, Stealing Harvard, The Kings of Summer, Smashed, Hotel Transylvania 2, Bob's Burgers, You, Me and the Apocalypse, The Great North and The Umbrella Academy. They began a live comedy tour in 2016, the theme of which was their sex life. In 2019, they started In Bed with Nick and Megan, a podcast discussing their personal lives while interviewing guests. They live in Los Angeles.

=== Politics ===
When asked whether he is a libertarian like his character Ron Swanson, Offerman said in 2017, "While I admire the philosophy of the libertarian mindset, I think it's proven to be ineffectual in actual governance. So no, I'm not. I'm a free-thinking American." He described Donald Trump as racist and sexist during the 2016 U.S. presidential election, but also mocked Trump's opponent Hillary Clinton for her private email controversy. Upon voting in the 2020 Democratic Party presidential primaries, he tweeted a photo of himself with an "I Voted" sticker, adding the caption "#VoteWarren" in reference to Democratic presidential candidate Elizabeth Warren. That year, he also tweeted his support for Democratic candidate Charles Booker in the U.S. Senate Democratic primary in Kentucky.

Although some political commentators likened Offerman's depiction of the U.S. President in Civil War to Donald Trump, Offerman denied that his performance was based on Trump and argued that politics did not serve as an influence on the film. In an April 2024 GQ interview, Offerman described himself as "progressive", but also "conservative in many ways". In the same interview, he said he believes the "semantics" of the political spectrum "have lost their meaning." On August 27, 2024, he endorsed Kamala Harris for the 2024 presidential election with a song titled "Proud to Be a Kamala Man", a parody of "God Bless the U.S.A." by Lee Greenwood.

== Acting credits ==
=== Film ===
Year	Title	Role	Notes
1997	Going All the Way	Wilks	
1998	City of Angels	Construction Worker	
1999	Treasure Island	Samuel	
2000	Groove	Sergeant Channahon	
2000	Forever Lulu	Man at Boardner's	
2002	Murder by Numbers	Officer at Richard's House	
2002	Stealing Harvard	Electrician at Patty’s House	
2004	November	Officer Roberts	
2005	Cursed	Officer	
2005	Sin City	Shlubb	
2005	Miss Congeniality 2	Karl Steele	
2006	Wristcutters: A Love Story	Cop	
2007	The Go-Getter	Nick the Potter	
2008	Harmony & Me	Meter Maid Man	
2009	The Men Who Stare at Goats	Scotty Mercer	
2009	Taking Chances	Sheriff Hoke Hollander	
2010	Audrey the Trainwreck	David George	
2010	All Good Things	Jim McCarthy	
2012	Somebody Up There Likes Me	Sal	Also producer
2012	Smashed	Dave Davies	
2012	21 Jump Street	Deputy Chief Hardy	
2012	Casa de Mi Padre	DEA Agent Parker	
2013	The Kings of Summer	Frank Toy	
2013	In a World...	Heners	
2013	We're the Millers	Don Fitzgerald	
2013	Paradise	Mr. Mannerhelm	
2014	Nick Offerman: American Ham	Himself	Stand-up film; Also writer and executive producer
2014	The Lego Movie	MetalBeard	Voice role
2014	Ernest & Celestine	George	Voice role; English dub
2014	Date and Switch	Terry	
2014	The Gunfighter	Narrator	Voice role; short film
2014	22 Jump Street	Deputy Chief Hardy	
2014	Believe Me	Sean	
2015	A Walk in the Woods	REI Dave	
2015	Me and Earl and the Dying Girl	Victor Gaines	
2015	Knight of Cups	Scott	
2015	Danny Collins	Guy DeLoach	
2015	Welcome to Happiness	Moses	
2015	Hotel Transylvania 2	Mike Loughran	Voice role
2016	Ice Age: Collision Course	Gavin	Voice role
2016	Sing	Norman	Voice role
2016	The Founder	Richard McDonald	
2017	Gunter Babysits	Norman	Voice role; short film
2017	The House of Tomorrow	Alan Whitcomb	Also executive producer
2017	The Little Hours	Lord Bruno	
2017	The Hero	Jeremy	
2017	My Life as a Courgette	Raymond	Voice role; English dub
2017	Infinity Baby	Neo	
2018	Nostalgia	Henry Greer	
2018	Hearts Beat Loud	Francis James "Frank" Fisher	
2018	Bad Times at the El Royale	Felix O'Kelly	
2018	White Fang	Marshal Weeden Scott	Voice role
2019	The Lego Movie 2: The Second Part	MetalBeard	Voice role
2019	Frances Ferguson	Narrator	Voice role
2019	Lucy in the Sky	Will Plimpton	
2020	Have a Good Trip: Adventures in Psychedelics	Himself	
2020	Sacred Cow	Narrator	Voice role
2021	Trollhunters: Rise of the Titans	Varvatos Vex	Voice role
2021	Sing 2	Norman	Voice role
2023	Origin	Dave	
2023	Dicks: The Musical	Steve Chaney	
2023	Dumb Money	Kenneth C. Griffin	
2023	Candy Cane Lane	Pip	
2024	Civil War	The President of the United States	
2024	The Life of Chuck	Narrator	Voice role
2025	Mission: Impossible – The Final Reckoning	General Sidney	
2025	Sovereign	Jerry Kane	
2025	Smurfs	Ken	Voice role
2026	The Pout-Pout Fish	Mr. Fish	Voice role
2026	Voicemails for Isabelle	Chef Bastien	
2027	Sonic the Hedgehog 4	TBA	Post-production, Voice role
2028	Elden Ring	TBA	Post-production

=== Television ===
Year	Title	Role	Notes
1997	ER	Rog	Episode: "Ambush"
1998	Arliss	Packers Fan	Episode: "Fans First"
1998	Profiler	Bobby	Episode: "Double Vision"
1998	KaBlam!	Colonel Kudzu	2 episodes
1999	The West Wing	Jerry	Episode: "The Crackpots and These Women"
2001	Will & Grace	Nick the Plumber	Episode: "Moveable Feast"
2002	The Practice	Charles Rossi	Episode: "Manifest Necessity"
2003	Good Morning Miami	Officer Nick	Episode: "About a Ploy"
2003	24	Marcus	3 episodes
2003	The King of Queens	The Man	Episode: "Thanks, Man"
2001–2003	NYPD Blue	Steven Debrees / Billy	2 episodes
2003–2004	George Lopez	Randy McGee	Recurring role
2004	Deadwood	Tom Mason	Episode: "Deep Water"
2005	Life on a Stick	Greg	Episode: "The Gods of TV"
2005	Monk	Jack Whitman	Episode: "Mr. Monk and the Election"
2003–2005	Gilmore Girls	Beau Belleville	2 episodes
2006	CSI: NY	Joe Green	Episodes: "Cool Hunter"
2006	3 lbs	Dr. Coffey	Episodes: "Lost for Words"
2007	American Body Shop	Rob	Main role
2008–2015	Childrens Hospital	Officer Chance Briggs	Recurring role
2009–2020	Parks and Recreation	Ron Swanson	Main role
2012–2019	Bob's Burgers	Cooper / Pete / Clem Clements (voices)	3 episodes
2012	The Cleveland Show	Harris Grundle (voice)	Episode: "Tis the Cleveland to Be Sorry"
2013	Conan	Ron Burgundy	Episode: "Occupy Conan: When Outsourcing Goes Too Far"
2013	Out There	Doug (voice)	Episode: "Viking Days"
2013	Drunk History	Johnny Cool	Episode: "Boston"
2013–2015	Axe Cop	Axe Cop (voice)	Main role; also executive producer
2014	Comedy Bang! Bang!	Himself	Episode: "Nick Offerman Wears a Green Flannel Shirt & Brown Boots"
2014	Kroll Show	Vanya	Episode: "Krolling Around with Nick Klown"
2014–2015	Gravity Falls	Agent Powers (voice)	4 episodes
2014–2021	The Simpsons	Captain Joseph Bowditch (voice)	2 episodes
2014	Sofia the First	Whiskers (voice)	Episode: "Winter's Gift"
2014–2025	Last Week Tonight with John Oliver	Guest actor and voice	Recurring role
2015	Fargo	Karl Weathers	Recurring role
2015	The Muppets	Himself	Episode: "Bear Left Then Bear Write"
2015	You, Me and the Apocalypse	Buddy	Episode: "Still Stuff Worth Fighting For"
2015	Brooklyn Nine-Nine	Frederick	Episode: "Ava"
2016	Life in Pieces	Spencer	Episode: "Annulled Roommate Pill Shower"
2016	Son of Zorn	Dr. Klorpnis (voice)	2 episodes
2017	Comrade Detective	Captain Covaci (voice)	Main role
2017	Curb Your Enthusiasm	Cody Goodger	Episode: "Fatwa!"
2018	Will & Grace	Jackson Boudreaux	Episode: "Friends and Lover"
2018–2021	Making It	Himself (host)	Main role
2018–2019	3Below: Tales of Arcadia	Commander Varvatos Vex (voice)	Main role
2019	Good Omens	Thaddeus Dowling	2 episodes
2020	The Good Place	Nick Offerman	Episode: "Whenever You're Ready"
2020	Devs	Forest	Miniseries; main role
2021–2025	The Great North	Beef Tobin (voice)	Main role
2021	Cinema Toast	Don Doolittle	Episode: "Familiesgiving"
2021	Duncanville	Zeb (voice)	Episode: "Das Banana Boot"
2021	Colin in Black & White	Rick Kaepernick	Limited series; Main role
2022	Pam & Tommy	Uncle Miltie	Miniseries
2022	37th Independent Spirit Awards	Himself (co-host)	Television special
2022	The Resort	Murray Thompson	Main role
2022	A League of Their Own	Dove Porter	3 episodes
2023	The Last of Us	Bill	Episode: "Long, Long Time"
2023	Party Down	Dermott	Episode: "First Annual PI2A Symposium"
2024	The Conners	Adam Chestnut	Episode: "The Publisher Cops Show Pilot"
2024	The Umbrella Academy	Dr. Gene Thibedeau	Recurring role
2025	97th Academy Awards	Announcer	Television special
2025	The Daily Show	Himself	2 episodes
2025	Death by Lightning	Chester A. Arthur	Miniseries
2026	Margo's Got Money Troubles	Jinx Millet	Main role

=== Theatre ===
Year	Title	Role	Venue
2014	Annapurna	Ulysses	Acorn Theatre, New York City
2015	A Confederacy of Dunces	Ignatius Reilly	Huntington Theatre Company, Boston
2026	Iceboy!	Eugene O'Neill	Goodman Theatre, Chicago

=== Video games ===
Year	Title	Voice role
1994	Club Dead	Lewis Scudder
2015	Lego Dimensions	MetalBeard

=== Theme park attractions ===
Year	Title	Role	Notes
2016	The Lego Movie: 4D – A New Adventure	MetalBeard (voice)	

=== Music videos ===
Year	Title	Role	Notes
1997	"Blame"	Muscle man	Music video by Collective Soul
2013	"Cocaine"	Himself	Music video by FIDLAR
2014	"Make You Better"	German talk show host	Music video by The Decemberists

== Awards and nominations ==
Organizations	Year	Category	Project	Result	Ref.
Astra TV Awards	2023	Best Guest Actor in a Drama Series	The Last of Us	Won	
Critics' Choice Television Awards	2011	Best Supporting Actor in a Comedy Series	Parks and Recreation	Nominated	
Critics' Choice Television Awards	2012	Best Supporting Actor in a Comedy Series	Parks and Recreation	Nominated	
Critics' Choice Television Awards	2015	Best Supporting Actor in a Miniseries or Movie	Fargo	Nominated	
Independent Spirit Awards	2023	Best Supporting Performance in a New Scripted Series	The Last of Us	Won	
Primetime Emmy Awards	2019	Outstanding Host for a Reality or Competition Program	Making It	Nominated	
Primetime Emmy Awards	2020	Outstanding Host for a Reality or Competition Program	Making It	Nominated	
Primetime Emmy Awards	2022	Outstanding Host for a Reality or Competition Program	Making It	Nominated	
Primetime Emmy Awards	2023	Outstanding Guest Actor in a Drama Series	The Last of Us (for "Long, Long Time")	Won	
Primetime Emmy Awards	2026	Outstanding Supporting Actor in a Comedy Series	Margo's Got Money Troubles	Nominated	
Primetime Emmy Awards	2026	Outstanding Supporting Actor in a Limited or Anthology Series or Movie	Death By Lightning	Nominated	
Saturn Awards	2023	Best Guest Star in a Television Series	The Last of Us	Nominated	
Television Critics Association Awards	2010	Individual Achievement in Comedy	Parks and Recreation	Nominated	
Television Critics Association Awards	2011	Individual Achievement in Comedy	Parks and Recreation	Won (Note: Tied with Ty Burrell for Modern Family.)	
Writers Guild of America Awards	2012	Comedy Series	Parks and Recreation	Nominated	
