= Ian Cairns (actor) =

Scottish actor

Ian Cairns (born 5 February 1963) is a Scottish actor. He trained at the Royal Scottish Academy of Music and Drama. TV credits include Bob Servant Independent (with Brian Cox), Hughie Green-Most Sincerely (with Trevor Eve), Jekyll (with James Nesbitt), Taggart, Vera and Law and Order: UK. Other credits include Julius Caesar, The Red Balloon and Diary of a Somebody.
