= John Gatins =

American actor

- Born: April 16, 1968 (age 58); New York City, U.S.
- Education: Vassar College (1990)
- Occupations: screenwriter, actor, director
- Years active: 1993–present

John Gatins (born April 16, 1968) is an American screenwriter, director, and actor. For writing the drama film Flight (2012), he was nominated for the Academy Award for Best Original Screenplay.

Gatins made his directorial feature debut by filming his screenplay for Dreamer (2005), and also wrote or co-wrote Coach Carter (2005), Real Steel (2011), Kong: Skull Island and Power Rangers (2017). As an actor, he has collaborated three times with Eddie Murphy, on Norbit (2007), Meet Dave (2008) and A Thousand Words (2012).

== Early life and education ==
Gatins was born in Manhattan, New York, where his father worked as a New York City police officer. Later, his family relocated to the Poughkeepsie area, where Gatins went on to attend Arlington High School and Vassar College. He graduated in 1990 with a degree in drama.

== Career ==
After graduation, Gatins moved to Los Angeles with the intention of pursuing acting. His first role was in the low budget 1993 horror film Witchboard 2: The Devil's Doorway, followed by a role in the 1994 movie Pumpkinhead II: Blood Wings. As he won small roles in larger-budget productions, including 1999's Varsity Blues and 2002's Big Fat Liar, Jeremy Kramer, a fellow Vassar grad and employee at Fox, paid him $1,000 to write a teen comedy by the name of Smells Like Teen Suicide. Varsity Blues was directed by Brian Robbins and produced by Michael Tollin, the latter of whom would, in 2001, direct Gatins's first screenplay, a romantic comedy entitled Summer Catch, while Robbins produced it. Robbins returned in 2000 to direct Gatins's second screenplay, a dramedy called Hardball. While continuing to act, Gatins wrote Coach Carter which was released in 2005. The same year, he presented his first directorial effort, Dreamer, which he also wrote.

At the suggestion of Steven Spielberg, Gatins was brought in to work on Real Steel, a science fiction film based on a 1956 Richard Matheson short story. Gatins considered the draft of the screenplay which he received when he began working on the project to be very dark, and he adapted it to focus more on the family aspects, such as the film's father-son relationship, about which he was accustomed to writing in his previous works. Real Steel was released October 7, 2011.

Since 1999, Gatins had been working on Flight, an original screenplay which, by 2009, was 149 pages. Robert Zemeckis picked up the script; and the resulting film, starring Denzel Washington, was released to critical acclaim in 2012. Gatins received a nomination for the Academy Award for Best Writing (Original Screenplay) at the 85th Academy Awards for his screenplay.

DreamWorks tapped Gatins to write a sequel to Real Steel before the film was released based on positive test screenings of the movie. He and his brother, George Gatins, also adapted the Electronic Arts videogame series Need for Speed into an eponymous film.

Gatins rewrote Kong: Skull Island (2017) for Legendary Pictures and Warner Bros. Pictures. He also rewrote the 2017 Power Rangers reboot film, incorporating aspects from previous drafts by Max Landis, Matt Sazama, Burk Sharpless, Michele Mulroney, and Kieran Mulroney.

In 2022, Gatins and Andrea Berloff have signed a creative partnership with Netflix.

== Filmography ==
| Year | Title | Writer | Producer | Notes |
|---|---|---|---|---|
| 2000 | Ready to Rumble | No | Co-producer | |
| 2001 | Summer Catch | Yes | Co-producer | |
| 2001 | Hardball | Yes | No | |
| 2005 | Coach Carter | Yes | No | |
| 2005 | Dreamer | Yes | No | Also director |
| 2011 | Real Steel | Yes | No | |
| 2012 | Flight | Yes | No | Nominated- Academy Award for Best Original Screenplay |
| 2014 | Need for Speed | Story | Yes | |
| 2017 | Kong: Skull Island | Story | No | |
| 2017 | Power Rangers | Yes | Executive | |
| 2024 | Little Wing | Yes | Yes | |
| TBA | The Last Mrs. Parrish | Yes | No | |
| TBA | Fight for '84 | Yes | No | |

Uncredited script revisions

- Varsity Blues (1999)
- Behind Enemy Lines (2001)
- Timeline (2003)
- Spectral (2016)

Acting roles

| Year | Title | Role | Notes |
|---|---|---|---|
| 1993 | Witchboard 2: The Devil's Doorway | Russel | |
| 1994 | Pumpkinhead II: Blood Wings | Young Caspar Dixon | Direct-to-video |
| 1995 | Leprechaun 3 | Scott McCoy | Direct-to-video |
| 1998 | Gods and Monsters | Kid Saylor | Uncredited |
| 1998 | Another Day in Paradise | Phil | |
| 1999 | Varsity Blues | Smiling Man | |
| 2001 | Impostor | Patient-Soldier | |
| 2002 | Big Fat Liar | Tow Truck Driver | |
| 2006 | The Shaggy Dog | Homeless Guy | |
| 2007 | Norbit | Attendant | |
| 2008 | Meet Dave | Air Traffic Controller | |
| 2009 | Harmony and Me | Homeless Tom | |
| 2010 | Fred: The Movie | Car Wash Clerk #1 | TV movie |
| 2010 | Terriers | Beach Bum | Episode "Hail Mary" |
| 2011 | Real Steel | Kingpin | |
| 2011 | Fred 2: Night of the Living Fred | Dishwasher | |
| 2012 | A Thousand Words | Valet | |
| 2017 | Crazy Ex-Girlfriend | Jeff Channington | Episode "Getting Over Jeff" |
| 2019 | Lying and Stealing | Aton Eisenstadt | |
| 2019 | Frances Ferguson | Warden | |

Thanks

- Ciggies (2006) (Short film)
- Eagle vs Shark (2007)
- Harmony and Me (2007)
- Martha Marcy May Marlene (2011)
- The House of Tomorrow (2017)
