= Alfredo Narciso =

American actor

- Born: July 8, 1973 (age 53); Milwaukee, Wisconsin, U.S.
- Education: University of Wisconsin–Eau Claire (BA)
- Occupation: Actor
- Years active: 2002–present
- Website: www.alfredonarciso.com

Alfredo Narciso (born July 8, 1973) is an American actor.

== Early life and education ==
Narciso was born in Milwaukee, Wisconsin to a Brazilian mother and a Filipino father. He showed an interest in acting from a young age. He began acting in middle school and high school, and remembers his first serious role occurring in the 10th grade when he portrayed a Russian spy in the play See How They Run. Narciso attended the University of Wisconsin–Eau Claire where he initially was a poor student. After being academically suspended, his father took him to New York City where he saw several Broadway shows, one of which was Oleanna by David Mamet. After his time in New York, Narciso changed his major from English to theater and excelled as a student.

== Career ==
Throughout his career, Narciso has been involved in a variety of television, stage and film productions. In television, he has played roles on Law & Order, Law & Order: Criminal Intent, Ugly Betty, Third Watch, Tough Crowd with Colin Quinn, Person of Interest, Blue Bloods, Unforgettable and All My Children. He appeared in the 2002 film The Guys with Sigourney Weaver and the 2016 film Jacqueline Argentine with Wyatt Cenac.

On stage, Narciso has performed in the Broadway shows The Motherfucker with the Hat and A Streetcar Named Desire. He has also performed in the Off-Broadway shows Thinner Than Water, Edgewise, Microcrisis, Measure for Measure, Chair, Safe, Drunken City, The Misanthrope and Points of Departure. He has appeared on stage elsewhere in productions including Miracle at Naples, Another Side of the Island, Territories, Britannicus, Much Ado About Nothing, A Very Old Man, and Off the Page.

== Filmography ==
=== Film ===
| Year | Title | Role | Notes |
|---|---|---|---|
| 2002 | The Guys | Diner Cashier | |
| 2003 | Living and Dining | Bernardo | |
| 2011 | Diega! | Wiseguy | |
| 2011 | Tied to a Chair | Suleiman | |
| 2012 | Elliot Loves | Uncle George | |
| 2014 | Like Sunday, Like Rain | Greg | |
| 2015 | Demolition | Michael | |
| 2016 | Jacqueline Argentine | Producer | |
| 2017 | The Dark Tower | Ex-Breaker | |
| 2020 | Worth | Defense Lawyer / William | |
| 2023 | A Stage of Twilight | George | |
| 2025 | One Stupid Thing | Ricardo | |

=== Television ===
| Year | Title | Role | Notes |
|---|---|---|---|
| 2003 | Law & Order | Juan | Episode: "Compassion" |
| 2005 | Third Watch | Luis | Episode: "The 'L' Word" |
| 2005 | Law & Order: Criminal Intent | Hector De La Cruz | Episode: "Stress Position" |
| 2008 | All My Children | Island Cop | 2 episodes |
| 2009 | Ugly Betty | Mr. Badlani | Episode: "The Wiener, the Bun and the Boob" |
| 2011 | Unforgettable | Det. Richard Franco | Episode: "With Honor" |
| 2011, 2016 | Person of Interest | Patrol Uni / Forensic Tech | 2 episodes |
| 2012 | Blue Bloods | Det. Montero | Episode: "The Uniform" |
| 2012 | My America | Hernán García | Episode: "The Day's Mail" |
| 2013 | The Good Wife | Officer Rivera | Episode: "Invitation to an Inquest" |
| 2013 | Phil Spector | Assistant | Television film |
| 2014 | The Blacklist | Agent Galarza | Episode: "Ivan (No. 88)" |
| 2014 | Madam Secretary | NTSB Chairman Humphrey Nelson | Episode: "Need to Know" |
| 2015 | The Following | Detective Alvarez | Episode: "Flesh & Blood" |
| 2015 | Beauty & the Beast | Director Hernandez | Episode: "Destined" |
| 2016 | House of Cards | Agent Holbrooke | 2 episodes |
| 2016 | The Family | Jonah | Episode: "Betta Male" |
| 2016 | Elementary | Det. Brooks | Episode: "To Catch a Predator Predator" |
| 2016, 2017 | Homeland | Senator Elian Coto | 2 episodes |
| 2018 | Jessica Jones | Ronald Garcia | 2 episodes |
| 2018 | Law & Order: SVU | Dylan Bergkamp | Episode: "Dare" |
| 2018–2019 | Manifest | Captain Riojas | 9 episodes |
| 2019 | The Code | Ruben Corredor | Episode: "P.O.G." |
| 2019 | Adult Ed. | Father Anthony | 2 episodes |
| 2019 | New Amsterdam | Dr. Juan Questa | Episode: "Good Soldiers" |
| 2019 | Ray Donovan | Mr. Martinez | Episode: "Hispes" |
| 2019–2020 | The Two Princes | Lord Chamberlain / Barabbas | 14 episodes |
| 2020 | Dispatches from Elsewhere | Prof Tyler Emery | Episode: "Clara" |
| 2020 | Big Dogs | Rafa | Episode: "As Seen on TV" |
| 2020 | Monsterland | Howler | Episode: "Palacios, Texas" |
| 2021 | Lisey's Story | Homeowner | Episode: "Blood Bool" |
| 2022–2023 | The Summer I Turned Pretty | Cleveland Castillo | 8 episodes |
| 2024 | Star Trek: Discovery | Ohvahz | Episode: "Whistlespeak" |
| 2025 | Elsbeth | Howard Thorwald | Episode: "Tiny Town" |
| 2026 | 56 Days | Elliot Berhane | 7 episodes |
