= 53rd Karlovy Vary International Film Festival =

2018 film festival in the Czech Republic

- Location: Karlovy Vary, Czech Republic
- Founded: 1946
- Awards: Crystal Globe: I Do Not Care If We Go Down in History as Barbarians by Radu Jude
- No. of films: 236
- Festival date: June 29–July 7, 2018
- Website: www.kviff.com/en/homepage

KVIFF chronology
- 54th 52nd

The 53rd Karlovy Vary International Film Festival took place from June 29 to July 7, 2018, in Karlovy Vary, Czech Republic.

A total of 236 films were presented at the festival, including 35 world premieres, eight international and seven European premieres.

== Juries ==
The following were appointed as the juries at the 53rd edition:

Grand Jury

- Mark Cousins (United Kingdom)
- Zrinka Cvitešić (Croatia)
- Marta Donzelli (Italy)
- Zdeněk Holý (Czech Republic)
- Nanouk Leopold (Netherlands)

FIPRESCI Jury

- René Marx (France)
- Marita Nyrhinen (Finland)
- Alejandra Trelles (Uruguay)

Europa Cinemas Label Jury

- Daira Āboliņa (Latvia)
- Simon Blaas (Netherlands)
- Balázs Kalmanovits (Hungary)
- Jan Makosch (Germany)

East of the West

- Peter Badač (Slovakia)
- Iris Elezi (Albania)
- Myriam Sassine (Lebanon)
- Dounia Sichov (France)
- Andrei Tănăsescu (Romania)

The Ecumenical Jury

- Michael Otřísal (Czech Republic)
- Milja Radovic (United Kingdom)
- David Sipoš (Slovenia)

Documentary Films

- Raúl Camargo (Chile)
- M. Siam (Egypt)
- Diana Tabakov (Czech Republic)

Fedeora Award

- Ștefan Dobroiu (Romania)
- Natascha Drubek (Germany)
- Nenad Dukić (Serbia)

== Official selection ==
=== In competition ===
| English title | Original title | Director(s) | Production countrie(s) |
|---|---|---|---|
| Brothers | Kardeşler | Ömür Atay | Turkey, Germany, Bulgaria |
| Domestique | Domestik | Adam Sedlák | Czech Republic, Slovakia |
| Fireflies Are Gone | La disparition des lucioles | Sébastien Pilote | Canada |
| History of Love | Zgodovina ljubezni | Sonja Prosenc | Slovenia, Italy, Norway |
| I Do Not Care If We Go Down in History as Barbarians † | Îmi este indiferent dacă în istorie vom intra ca barbari | Radu Jude | Romania, Czech Republic, France, Bulgaria, Germany |
| Jumpman | Podbrosy | Ivan I. Tverdovskiy | Russia, Lithuania, Ireland, France |
| Miriam Lies | Miriam miente | Natalia Cabral, Oriol Estrada | Dominican Republic, Spain |
| Panic Attack | Atak paniki | Paweł Maślona | Poland |
| Redemption | Geula | Joseph Madmony, Boaz Yehonatan Yacov | Israel |
| Sueño Florianópolis ‡ | | Ana Katz | Argentina, Brazil, France |
| To the Night | | Peter Brunner | Austria, United States |
| Winter Flies | Všechno bude | Olmo Omerzu | Czech Republic, Slovenia, Poland, Slovakia |

Highlighted title and dagger (†) indicates Crystal Globe winner.
Highlighted title and double-dagger (‡) indicates Special Jury Prize winner.

=== Out of competition ===
| English title | Original title | Director(s) | Production countrie(s) |
|---|---|---|---|
| My Friend "A" | Yuzai | Takahisa Zeze | Japan |
| Support the Girls | | Andrew Bujalski | United States |
| Trash on Mars | Mars | Benjamin Tuček | Czech Republic |

=== Another View ===
| English title | Original title | Director(s) | Production countrie(s) |
|---|---|---|---|
| Amal | | Mohamed Siam | Egypt, Lebanon, France, Germany, Norway, Denmark, Qatar |
| And Breathe Normally | Andið eðlilega | Ísold Uggadóttir | Iceland |
| Border | Gräns | Ali Abbasi | Sweden, Denmark |
| Boys Cry | La terra dell'abbastanza | Damiano and Fabio D'Innocenzo | Italy |
| Chris the Swiss | | Anja Kofmel | Switzerland, Croatia, Germany, Finland |
| Cobain | | Nanouk Leopold | Netherlands, Belgium, Germany |
| Diamantino | | Gabriel Abrantes, Daniel Schmidt | Portugal, France, Brazil |
| Donbass | | Sergei Loznitsa | Germany, Ukraine, France, Netherlands, Romania |
| An Elephant Sitting Still | Da xiang xi di er zuo | Hu Bo | China |
| Fugue | Fuga | Agnieszka Smoczyńska | Poland, Czech Republic, Sweden |
| The Gentle Indifference of the World | Laskovoe bezrazlichie mira | Adilkhan Yerzhanov | Kazakhstan, France |
| Grass | Pullipdeul | Hong Sang-soo | South Korea |
| The Guilty | Den skyldige | Gustav Möller | Denmark |
| Invasion | Hojoom | Shahram Mokri | Iran |
| In My Room | | Ulrich Köhler | Germany, Italy |
| Light Years | Años Luz | Manuel Abramovich | Argentina, Spain, Brazil |
| Little Tickles | Les chatouilles | Andréa Bescond, Eric Métayer | France |
| Lucky | | John Carroll Lynch | United States |
| Nina | | Olga Chajdas | Poland |
| Oblivion Verses | Los Versos del Olvido | Alireza Khatami | France, Germany, Netherlands, Chile |
| Our Struggles | Nos batailles | Guillaume Senez | Belgium, France |
| Pity | Oiktos | Babis Makridis | Greece, Poland |
| Profile | | Timur Bekmambetov | United Kingdom, United States, Russia, Cyprus |
| The Queen of Fear | La reina del miedo | Valeria Bertuccelli, Fabiana Tiscornia | Argentina, Denmark |
| Rafiki | | Wanuri Kahiu | Kenya |
| A Skin So Soft | Ta Peau si lisse | Denis Côté | Canada, Switzerland, France |
| Styx | | Wolfgang Fischer | Germany, Austria |
| Victory Day | Den' Pobedy | Sergei Loznitsa | Germany |
| Virgins | Ein Betulot Bakrayot | Keren Ben Rafael | France, Israel, Belgium |

=== Czech Films 2017–2018 ===
| English title | Original title | Director(s) | Production countrie(s) |
|---|---|---|---|
| Dukla 61 | | David Ondříček | Czech Republic |
| Insect | Hmyz | Jan Švankmajer | Czech Republic, Slovakia |
| The Interpreter | Tlumočník | Martin Šulík | Slovakia, Czech Republic, Austria |
| Laika | Lajka | Aurel Klimt | Czech Republic |
| Markéta Wants Her Bag | Markéta chce taštičku | Miroslav Janek | Czech Republic |
| Nothing Like Before | Nic jako dřív | Lukáš Kokeš, Klára Tasovská | Czech Republic |
| Scalamare | | Jiří Kylián | Czech Republic, Netherlands |
| Short Cut | Na krátko | Jakub Šmíd | Czech Republic |
| Universum Brdečka | | Miroslav Janek | Czech Republic |
| When the War Comes | Až přijde válka | Jan Gebert | Czech Republic, Croatia |

=== Documentary Films ===
| English title | Original title | Director(s) | Production countrie(s) |
|---|---|---|---|
| The Best Thing You Can Do with Your Life | | Zita Erffa | Germany, Mexico |
| Breaking News | Mimořádná zpráva | Tomáš Bojar | Czech Republic |
| Bridges of Time | Laika tilti | Kristine Briede, Audrius Stonys | Lithuania, Latvia, Estonia |
| Cielo | | Alison McAlpine | Canada, Chile |
| Dream Away | | Marouan Omara, Johanna Domke | Germany, Egypt |
| In the Stillness of Sounds | L' esprit des lieux | Stéphane Manchematin, Serge Steyer | France |
| Inside Mosul | V Mosulu | Jana Andert | Czech Republic |
| A Little Wisdom | Xiao Zhihui | Yuqi Kang | Canada, Nepal, China |
| Putin's Witnesses † | Svideteli Putina | Vitaly Mansky | Latvia, Switzerland, Czech Republic |
| The Swing | | Cyril Aris | Lebanon |
| Treasure Island | L' Île au trésor | Guillaume Brac | France |
| Walden ‡ | | Daniel Zimmermann | Switzerland, Austria |

Highlighted title and dagger (†) indicates Best Documentary Film winner.
Highlighted title and double-dagger (‡) indicates Documentary Special Jury Prize winner.

=== East of the West ===
| English title | Original title | Director(s) | Production countrie(s) |
|---|---|---|---|
| 53 Wars | 53 wojny | Ewa Bukowska | Poland |
| Amir | | Nima Eghlima | Iran |
| Bear with Us | Chata na prodej | Tomáš Pavlíček | Czech Republic |
| Blossom Valley ‡ | Virágvölgy | László Csuja | Hungary |
| Breathing into Marble | Kvėpavimas į marmurą | Giedrė Beinoriūtė | Lithuania, Latvia, Croatia |
| Crystal Swan | Khrustal | Darya Zhuk | Belarus, Germany, United States, Russia |
| Deep Rivers | Glubokie reki | Vladimir Bitokov | Russia |
| Moments | Chvilky | Beata Parkanová | Czech Republic, Slovakia |
| Pause | Παύση | Tonia Mishiali | Cyprus, Greece |
| Suleiman Mountain † | Suleiman gora | Elizaveta Stishova | Kyrgyzstan, Russia |
| Via Carpatia | | Klara Kochańska | Poland, Czech Republic, North Macedonia |
| Volcano | Vulkan | Roman Bondarchuk | Ukraine, Germany |

Highlighted title and dagger (†) indicates East of the West winner.
Highlighted title and double-dagger (‡) indicates East of the West Special Jury Prize winner.

=== Future Frames: Ten New Filmmakers to Follow ===
| English title | Original title | Director(s) | Production countrie(s) |
|---|---|---|---|
| 1981 | Nittonhundraåttioett | Dawid Ullgren | Sweden |
| Blackjack | Valet noir | Lora Mure-Ravaud | Switzerland |
| Clean | Čistoća | Neven Samardžić | Bosnia and Herzegovina |
| Dialect | | David Gurgulia | Georgia |
| The Legionnaire | Il leginario | Hleb Papou | Italy |
| Marica | | Judita Gamulin | Croatia |
| Regained Memory | | Stijn Bouma | Netherlands, Bosnia and Herzegovina |
| Sweet Home Czyżewo | | Jakub Radej | Poland |
| Warm Comedy about Depression, Madness and Unfulfilled Dreams | Hrejivá komédia o depresii, šialenstve a nesplnených snoch | Michal Ďuriš | Slovakia |
| Where the Summer Goes (chapters on youth) | Onde o Verão Vai (episódios da juventude) | David Pinheiro Vicente | Portugal |

=== Horizons ===
| English title | Original title | Director(s) | Production countrie(s) |
|---|---|---|---|
| 3 Faces | Se Rokh | Jafar Panahi | Iran |
| Birds of Passage | Pájaros de verano | Ciro Guerra, Cristina Gallego | Colombia, Denmark, Mexico |
| BlacKkKlansman | | Spike Lee | United States |
| Burning | | Lee Chang-dong | South Korea |
| Climax | | Gaspar Noé | France |
| Cold War | Zimna wojna | Paweł Pawlikowski | Poland, France, United Kingdom |
| Damsel | | David Zellner, Nathan Zellner | United States |
| Daughter of Mine | Figlia mia | Laura Bispuri | Italy, Germany, Switzerland |
| Dear Son | Weldi | Mohamed Ben Attia | Tunisia, Belgium, France, Qatar |
| Dovlatov | | Aleksei Alekseivich German | Russia, Poland, Serbia |
| Euphoria | Euforia | Valeria Golino | Italy |
| Everybody Knows | Todos lo saben | Asghar Farhadi | Spain, France, Italy |
| Girl | | Lukas Dhont | Belgium |
| Good Manners | As boas maneiras | Juliana Rojas, Marco Dutra | Brazil, France |
| Happy as Lazzaro | Lazzaro Felice | Alice Rohrwacher | Italy, Switzerland, France, Germany |
| Hostiles | | Scott Cooper | United States |
| Hunting Season | Temporada de Caza | Natalia Garagiola | Argentina, United States, France, Germany, Qatar |
| Leave No Trace | | Debra Granik | United States |
| Loveling | Benzinho | Gustavo Passos Pizzi | Brazil, Uruguay, Germany |
| Lucia's Grace | Troppa Grazia | Gianni Zanasi | Italy |
| The Man Who Killed Don Quixote | | Terry Gilliam | Spain, Belgium, Portugal, United Kingdom |
| The Miseducation of Cameron Post | | Desiree Akhavan | United States |
| Museum | Museo | Alonso Ruizpalacios | Mexico |
| Nico, 1988 | | Susanna Nicchiarelli | Italy, Belgium |
| The Parting Glass | | Stephen Moyer | United States |
| Rainbow: A Private Affair | Una questione privata | Paolo and Vittorio Taviani | Italy, France |
| River's Edge | | Isao Yukisada | Japan |
| Season of the Devil | Ang Panahon ng Halimaw | Lav Diaz | Philippines |
| Summer | Leto | Kirill Serebrennikov | Russia, France |
| Sweet Country | | Warwick Thornton | Australia |
| Touch Me Not | | Adina Pintilie | Romania, Germany, Czech Republic, Bulgaria, France |
| To the Ends of the World | Les confins du monde | Guillaume Nicloux | France, China, Belgium |
| Utøya: July 22 | Utøya 22. juli | Erik Poppe | Norway |
| Wajib | | Annemarie Jacir | Palestine, France, Germany, Colombia, Norway, Qatar, United Arab Emirates |
| The Wild Pear Tree | Ahlat Agaci | Nuri Bilge Ceylan | Turkey, France, Germany, Bulgaria |
| Wildlife | | Paul Dano | United States |
| The World Is Yours | Le Monde est à toi | Romain Gavras | France |
| Zama | | Lucrecia Martel | Argentina, Brazil, Spain, France, Netherlands, Mexico, Portugal, United States |

=== Imagina ===
| English title | Original title | Director(s) | Production countrie(s) |
|---|---|---|---|
| 11 × 14 | | James Benning | United States |
| Art and Theft | | Sara Magenheimer | United States |
| Black Mother | | Khalik Allah | United States, Jamaica |
| Caniba | | Verena Paravel, Lucien Castaing-Taylor | France |
| Elegy | | Louis Rizzo-Naudi | United Kingdom |
| Endless Tail | Beskrajni rep | Željka Suková | Croatia |
| Flame | Polte | Sami van Ingen | Finland |
| Forest Paths | | Michiel van Bakel | Netherlands |
| Government House | Haus der Regierung | Herwig Weiser | Austria, Russia |
| The Green Fog | | Guy Maddin, Evan Johnson, Galen Johnson | Canada, United States |
| Imperial Valley (cultivated run-off) | | Lukas Marxt | Germany, Austria |
| Phantom Ride Phantom | | Siegfried A. Fruhauf | Austria |
| Reflections in the Dust | | Luke Sullivan | Australia |
| Ride Like Lightning, Crash Like Thunder | | Fern Silva | United States |
| Sleep Has Her House | | Scott Barley | United Kingdom |
| ★ | | Johann Lurf | Austria |

=== Made in Texas: Tribute to Austin Film Society ===
| English title | Original title | Director(s) | Production countrie(s) |
|---|---|---|---|
| 1985 | | Yen Tan | United States |
| Computer Chess | | Andrew Bujalski | United States |
| Death of a Rock Star | | Tom Huckabee, Will Van Overbeek | United States |
| Dried Meat | Carne seca | Jazmin Diaz | United States |
| El Mariachi | | Robert Rodriguez | United States |
| Fair Sisters | | Missy Boswell, Edward Lowry, Louis Black | United States |
| Invasion of the Aluminum People | | David Boone | United States |
| Kid-Thing | | David Zellner | United States |
| Last Night at the Alamo | | Eagle Pennell | United States |
| Leonardo, Jr. | | Lorrie Oshatz | United States |
| Mask of Sarnath | | Neil Ruttenberg | United States |
| Pioneer | | David Lowery | United States |
| The Rabbit Hunt | | Patrick Bresnan | United States |
| Skunk | | Annie Silverstein | United States |
| Slacker | | Richard Linklater | United States |
| The Slow Business of Going | | Athina Rachel Tsangari | Greece, United States |
| Somebody Up There Likes Me | | Bob Byington | United States |
| Speed of Light | | Brian Hansen | United States |
| Take Shelter | | Jeff Nichols | United States |
| The Unforeseen | | Laura Dunn | United States |

=== Midnight Screenings ===
| English title | Original title | Director(s) | Production countrie(s) |
|---|---|---|---|
| Big Trouble in Little China | | John Carpenter | United States |
| Bloodsport | | Newt Arnold | United States |
| Highlander | | Russell Mulcahy | United Kingdom, United States |
| Mandy | | Panos Cosmatos | United Kingdom, Belgium |
| One Cut of the Dead | Camera wo Tomeru na! | Shin'ichirō Ueda | Japan |
| Predator | | John McTiernan | United States |

=== Out of the Past ===
| English title | Original title | Director(s) | Production countrie(s) |
|---|---|---|---|
| 2001: A Space Odyssey | | Stanley Kubrick | United Kingdom, United States |
| Accumulator 1 | Akumulátor 1 | Jan Svěrák | Czech Republic |
| The Cranes Are Flying | Letyat zhuravli | Mikhail Kalatozov | USSR |
| Diamonds of the Night | Démanty noci | Jan Němec | Czechoslovakia |
| The Eyes of Orson Welles | | Mark Cousins | United Kingdom |
| Hal | | Amy Scott | United States |
| Jiří Menzel – To Make a Comedy Is No Fun | | Robert Kolinsky | Switzerland, Czech Republic |
| Robin Williams: Come Inside My Mind | | Marina Zenovich | United States |
| Searching for Ingmar Bergman | | Margarethe von Trotta | Germany, France |
| Signum Laudis | | Martin Hollý | Czechoslovakia |
| Strangers on a Train | | Alfred Hitchcock | United States |
| White Paradise | Bílý ráj | Karel Lamač | Czechoslovakia |

=== People Next Door ===
| English title | Original title | Director(s) | Production countrie(s) |
|---|---|---|---|
| Children of a Lesser God | | Randa Haines | United States |
| Land of Silence and Darkness | Land des Schweigens und der Dunkelheit | Werner Herzog | Germany |
| The Past | Minulost | Ivo Trajkov | Czech Republic |
| A Quiet Place | | John Krasinski | United States |
| See No Evil, Hear No Evil | | Arthur Hiller | United States |
| The Silent Child | | Chris Overton | United States |
| The Tribe | Plemya | Myroslav Slaboshpytskyi | Ukraine |

=== Prague Short Film Festival Presents ===
| English title | Original title | Director(s) | Production countrie(s) |
|---|---|---|---|
| And So We Put Goldfish in the Pool | Soushite watashitachi wa pûru ni kingyo o | Makoto Nagahisa | Japan |
| Atlantis, 2003 | Atlantída, 2003 | Michal Blaško | Slovakia, Czech Republic |
| Bo Hai | | Dužan Duong | Czech Republic |
| Downside Up | | Peter Ghesquière | Belgium |
| Partner | Réplique | Antoine Giorgini | France |

=== Reflections of Time: Baltic Poetic Documentary ===
| English title | Original title | Director(s) | Production countrie(s) |
|---|---|---|---|
| 235 000 000 | | Uldis Brauns | Latvia |
| 511 Best Photographs of Mars | 511 paremat fotot Marsist | Andres Sööt | Estonia |
| Antigravitation | Antigravitacija | Audrius Stonys | Lithuania |
| Apolinaras | | Henrikas Šablevičius | Lithuania |
| The Beginning | Sākums | Uldis Brauns | Latvia |
| The Coast | Krasts | Aivars Freimanis | Latvia |
| The Dreams of the Centenarians | Šimtamečių godos | Robertas Verba | Lithuania |
| Earth of the Blind | Neregių žemė | Audrius Stonys | Lithuania |
| El Dorado | Eldoraado | Ülo Tambek | Estonia |
| The Ferry | Prāmis | Laila Pakalniņa | Latvia |
| In Memory of a Day Gone By | Praėjusios dienos atminimui | Šarūnas Bartas | Lithuania |
| The Linen | Veļa | Laila Pakalniņa | Latvia |
| The Mail | Pasts | Laila Pakalniņa | Latvia |
| Midsummer Day | Jaanipäev | Andres Sööt | Estonia |
| The Old Man and the Land | Senis ir žemė | Robertas Verba | Lithuania |
| Peasants | Talupojad | Ülo Tambek | Estonia |
| Pikk Street | Pikk tänav | Hans Roosipuu | Estonia |
| Ten Minutes Older | Vecāks par 10 minūtēm | Herz Frank | Latvia |
| A Trip Through Misty Meadows | Kelionė ūkų lankomis | Henrikas Šablevičius | Lithuania |
| We Were at Our Own Field | Pabuvam savam lauki | Henrikas Šablevičius | Lithuania |
| White Bell | Baltie zvani | Ivars Kraulītis | Latvia |
| Woman from Kihnu | Kihnu naine | Mark Soosaar | Estonia |

=== Seven Close Encounters ===
| English title | Original title | Director(s) | Production countrie(s) |
|---|---|---|---|
| All That Jazz | | Bob Fosse | United States |
| Billy the Kid and the Green Baize Vampire | | Alan Clarke | United Kingdom |
| The Deer Hunter | | Michael Cimino | United States, United Kingdom |
| Lawrence of Arabia | | David Lean | United Kingdom |
| Marketa Lazarová | | František Vláčil | Czechoslovakia |
| Match Point | | Woody Allen | United Kingdom, Ireland, Luxembourg |
| Take Care of Your Scarf, Tatiana | Pidä huivista kiinni, Tatjana | Aki Kaurismäki | Finland |

=== Special Events ===
| English title | Original title | Director(s) | Production countrie(s) |
|---|---|---|---|
| Bob Roberts | | Tim Robbins | United States, United Kingdom |
| Cirkus Rwanda | | Michal Varga | Czech Republic, Slovakia |
| Cradle Will Rock | | Tim Robbins | United States |
| In Treatment 3 | Terapie 3 | Matěj Chlupáček, Petr Zelenka | Czech Republic |
| King Skate | | Šimon Šafránek | Czech Republic |
| Loves of a Blonde | Lásky jedné plavovlásky | Miloš Forman | Czechoslovakia |
| Paterno | | Barry Levinson | United States |
| Rain Man | | Barry Levinson | United States |
| The Rover | | David Michôd | Australia, United States |
| Searching | Bloudění | Antonín Máša, Jan Čuřík | Czechoslovakia |
| Sharp Objects | | Jean-Marc Vallée | United States |
| Sink or Swim | Le grand bain | Gilles Lellouche | France |
| Wag the Dog | | Barry Levinson | United States |

== Awards ==
The following awards were presented at the 53rd edition:

=== Official selection awards ===
Grand Prix – Crystal Globe

I Do Not Care If We Go Down in History as Barbarians by Radu Jude

Special Jury Prize

Sueño Florianópolis by Ana Katz

Best Director

Olmo Omerzu for Winter Flies

Best Actress

Mercedes Morán for Sueño Florianópolis

Best Actor

Moshe Folkenflik for Redemption

Special Jury Mention

History of Love by Sonja Prosenc
Jumpman by Ivan I. Tverdovskiy

=== Other statutory awards ===
East of the West Grand Prix

Suleiman Mountain by Elizaveta Stishova

East of the West Special Jury Prize

Blossom Valley by László Csuja

Grand Prix for Best Documentary Film

Putin's Witnesses by Vitaly Mansky

Documentary Special Jury Prize

Walden by Daniel Zimmermann

Právo Audience Award

Rain Man by Barry Levinson

Crystal Globe for Outstanding Artistic Contribution to World Cinema

Tim Robbins (United States)
Barry Levinson (United States)

Festival President's Award

Robert Pattinson (United Kingdom)

Festival President's Award for Contribution to Czech Cinematography

Jaromír Hanzlík (Czech Republic)

=== Non-statutory awards ===
Award of International Film Critics (FIPRESCI)

Sueño Florianópolis by Ana Katz

The Ecumenical Jury Award

Redemption by Joseph Madmony, Boaz Yehonatan Yacov

Ecumenical Commendations

Winter Flies by Olmo Omerzu
Miriam Lies by Natalia Cabral, Oriol Estrada

FEDEORA Award

Suleiman Mountain by Elizaveta Stishova

Europa Cinemas Label Award

I Do Not Care If We Go Down in History as Barbarians by Radu Jude
