= Lamis Ammar =

Palestinian actress (born 1992)

- لميس عمار
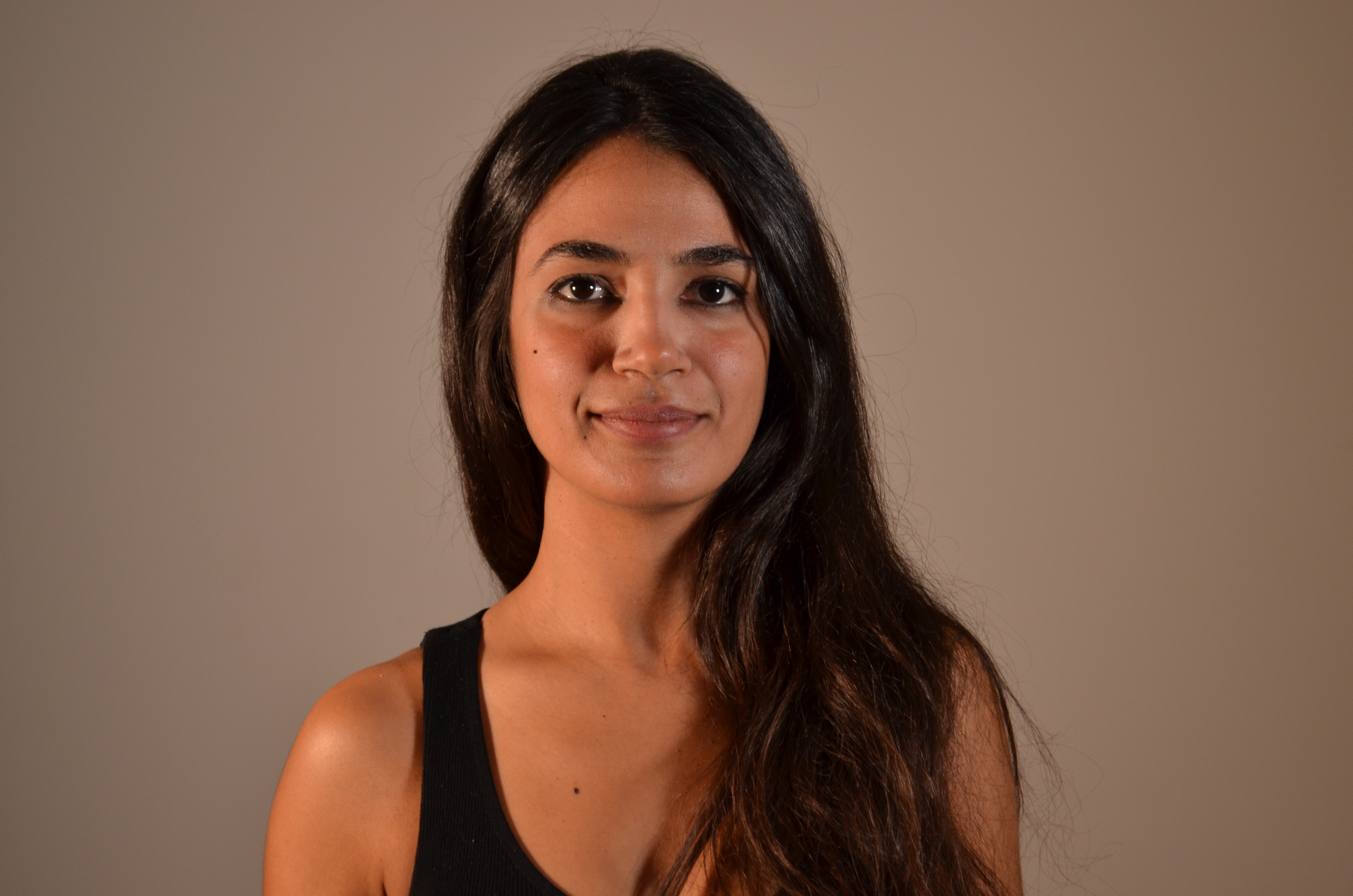
- Lamis Ammar, 2023
- Born: 1992 (age 33–34); Acre
- Education: University of Haifa
- Occupations: Actress, writer, video artist
- Years active: 2010s–present
- Known for: Sand Storm (2016), Salty Roads, activism

Lamis Ammar (Arabic: لميس عمار; born 1992) is a Palestinian actress, writer, and video artist. She gained recognition for her lead role in the film Sand Storm (2016), which received the Grand Jury Prize at the Sundance Film Festival.

== Life and career ==
Ammar was born in Acre in 1992 into a Palestinian family originating from Acre and Al-Tira. When she was four, her family moved to the lower city of Haifa. She studied theater and acting at the University of Haifa and graduated with a Bachelor's degree. Initially, she wanted to be a clown, but chose acting as a major, as this was the closest to clowning at university she could find. She had worked as a clown at an amusement park during high school. During her studies, she worked in a puppet theater for children to earn money.

She began her artistic career at the community-based The Freedom Theatre in the Jenin Refugee Camp in the West Bank during her second year of studies. She performed in various productions, including works by William Shakespeare and Bertolt Brecht, and participated in theater festivals in Nazareth, Jaffa, Haifa, and Ramallah. In 2018, she won the main prize of the Teatronetro Theater Festival in Jaffa for the monodrama Salty Roads that she performed.

During her studies, she also started acting in films. In 2016, she acted in the lead role of feature film Sand Storm. The film won a Grand Jury Prize at the Sundance Film Festival and was shown at the Berlin International Film Festival. Ammar was nominated for the Ophir Award as Best Actress for the film. She also appeared in A Tramway in Jerusalem (2018) directed by Amos Gitai and Between Heaven and Earth (2019) directed by Najwa Najjar. In 2019, she received an award for her role in the short film Beit Berl. She is one of the lead actresses in the upcoming film Desert Warrior alongside Anthony Mackie and Ben Kingsley.

Lamis Ammar currently (2025) resides in Berlin in Germany. Since 2019, she has acted in German theaters, among them Maxim Gorki Theater and Volksbühne. She moved to Germany, because in Haifa, she felt "as if I was treated as a provocation just because I am Palestinian". When she spoke out publicly about Palestinian victims of the Gaza genocide, she received death threats and several Israeli newspapers defamed her. Her play Mein bedrohliches Gedicht, set to premiere at Volksbühne in Berlin in November 2023, was postponed and only taken up again in 2024. She criticized the repression of free speech around Palestine in Germany.

She is fluent in Arabic, Hebrew, English, and German. Besides acting, she has written scripts and worked as a video artist for several galleries in Haifa (among them the Beit-HaGefen Arab Jewish Culture Center in 2017).

== Filmography ==
- Sand Storm (2016)
- Sirens (TV series, 2017)
- A Tramway in Jerusalem (2018)
- Between Heaven and Earth (2019)
- Beit Berl (2019)
- Silence of the Desert (2021)
- Irene and Steve (2022)
- Desert Warrior (2025)
