= Bad Kids =

Bad Kids may refer to:

- Bad Kids, a 1994 novel by Yuka Murayama
- Ikenai Kotachi (いけない子達 The Bad Kids) a five-member session band (see list of bands associated with Ringo Sheena)
- "Bad Kids", a song by Black Lips from Good Bad Not Evil
- "Bad Kids", a song by Lady Gaga from Born This Way
- The Bad Kids, a 2016 documentary film about an alternative school for at risk students
- The Bad Kids (隐秘的角落, Hidden Corner), a 2020 Chinese web television series that premiered on iQiyi

== See also ==
- Bad Kids Go to Hell, a 2012 dark comedy thriller film
