= Inés Bortagaray =

Uruguayan writer and screenwriter

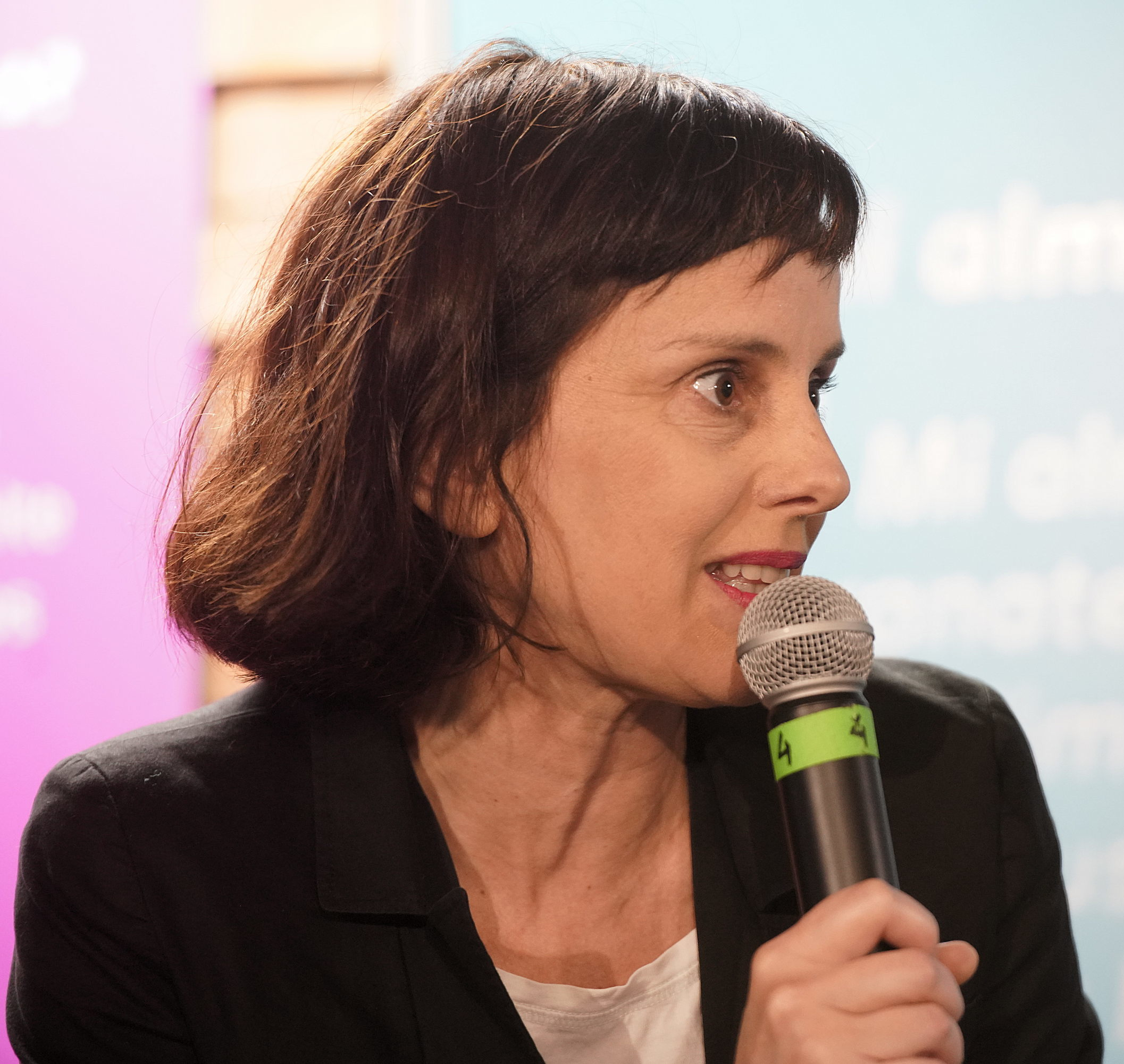
- Bortagaray in 2019
- Born: 22 June 1975 (age 50); Salto Department, Uruguay
- Occupation: Writer, screenwriter, professor

Inés Bortagaray Sabarrós (born 22 May 1975) is a Uruguayan writer and screenwriter.

She is the author of Ahora tendré que matarte (2001) and Prontos, listos, ya (2006 and republished in 2010), and has had stories included in anthologies such as Palabras errantes and Pequeñas Resistencias 3, antología del nuevo cuento sudamericano. She has written various screenplays, one of which won an award at the Sundance Film Festival.

== Life ==
With her three siblings, she frequented the Ariel, Metropol, and Sarandí movie theaters in Salto and had her first encounters with the world of film, which she later deepened in Montevideo with her fellow communications students and visits to Cinemateca Uruguaya.

She worked as a reporter for Posdata and carried out various projects with the design studio Monocromo, including the Banco de Seguros del Estado almanacs (2009-2015).

She runs a screenplay workshop for the Escuela Nacional de Bellas Artes audiovisual media program in Playa Hermosa, Maldonado Department.

== Work ==
=== Books ===
- Ahora tendré que matarte (2001, Cauce Editorial, Flexes Terpines collection, managed by writer Mario Levrero)
- Prontos, listos, ya (2006, Artefato)

=== Films ===
- Window Boy Would Also Like to Have a Submarine (2020) as Elsa
- Mi amiga del parque (2015, screenplay with Ana Katz)
- Mujer conejo (2010, screenplay with Verónica Chen)
- La vida útil (2010, screenplay with Federico Veiroj)
- Luna con dormilones (screenplay, Pablo Uribe film that participated in the 2012-2013 Montevideo Biennial and won the "El Azahar" grand prize at the tenth Salto Art Biennial)
- El tiempo pasa (2013, screenplay)
- Una novia errante (2006, feature film screenplay with Ana Katz)
- Otra historia del mundo (2017, screenplay, feature film based on the novel Alivio de luto by Mario Delgado Aparaín, with the author and Guillermo Casanova)
- El fin del mundo (television series, 13 episodes, with Adrián Biniez, original idea with Juan Pablo Rebella and Pablo Stoll)
- Eight short testimonials for TV Ciudad in Montevideo about menarche, first sexual relations, first childbirth, and menopause (2001, direction, research, and production)
- Tokyo Boogie (participated in writing the screenplay, Pablo Casacuberta and Yuki Goto)

== Awards ==
- The screenplay for Tokyo Boogie was a finalist for Latin America at the 2001 Sundance Film Festival and in 2002 it received the FONA (Fondo para el Fomento y Desarrollo de la Producción Audiovisual en Uruguay)
- The film Una novia errante received the Cine en Construcción de la Industria award at the 54th San Sebastián International Film Festival in 2006.
- Received the World Cinema Dramatic Special Jury Award for Screenwriting at the 2016 Sundance Film Festival for her work on the film Mi amiga del parque.
