= 2016 Sundance Film Festival =

2016 edition of film festival

- Festival poster
- Location: Park City, Salt Lake City, Ogden, and Sundance, Utah
- Hosted by: Sundance Institute
- Festival date: January 21 to January 31, 2016
- Language: English
- Website: sundance.org/festival
- 2017 Sundance Film Festival 2015 Sundance Film Festival

The 2016 Sundance Film Festival took place from January 21 to January 31, 2016. The first lineup of competition films was announced on December 2, 2015. The opening night film was Norman Lear: Just Another Version of You, directed by Heidi Ewing and Rachel Grady. The closing night film was Louis Black and Karen Bernstein's Richard Linklater: Dream Is Destiny.

== Awards ==
The following awards were presented:

- Grand Jury Prize: Dramatic – The Birth of a Nation by Nate Parker
- Directing Award: Dramatic – Daniel Scheinert and Daniel Kwan for Swiss Army Man
- Waldo Salt Screenwriting Award – Chad Hartigan for Morris From America
- U.S. Dramatic Special Jury Award – Miles Joris-Peyrafitte for As You Are
- U.S. Dramatic Special Jury Award for Breakthrough Performance – Joe Seo for Spa Night
- U.S. Dramatic Special Jury Award for Individual Performance – Melanie Lynskey for The Intervention and Craig Robinson for Morris from America
- Grand Jury Prize: Documentary – Weiner by Elyse Steinberg and Josh Kriegman
- Directing Award: Documentary – Roger Ross Williams for Life, Animated
- U.S. Documentary Special Jury Award for Editing – Penny Lane and Thom Stylinski for NUTS!
- Special Jury Prize for Social Impact: Documentary – Trapped by Dawn Porter
- U.S. Documentary Special Jury Award for Writing – Robert Greene for Kate Plays Christine
- Special Jury Prize for Verité Filmmaking: Documentary – The Bad Kids by Keith Fulton and Lou Pepe
- World Cinema Grand Jury Prize: Dramatic – Sand Storm by Elite Zexer
- World Cinema Directing Award: Dramatic – Felix van Groeningen for Belgica
- World Cinema Dramatic Special Jury Award for Acting – Vicky Hernandez and Manolo Cruz for Between Land and Sea
- World Cinema Dramatic Special Jury Award for Screenwriting – Ana Katz and Inés Bortagaray for Mi Amiga del Parque
- World Cinema Dramatic Special Jury Award for Unique Vision & Design – The Lure by Agnieszka Smoczyńska
- World Cinema Jury Prize: Documentary – Sonita by Rokhsareh Ghaemmaghami
- World Cinema Directing Award: Documentary – Michal Marczak for All These Sleepless Nights
- World Cinema Documentary Special Jury Award for Best Debut Feature – Heidi Brandenburg and Mathew Orzel for When Two Worlds Collide
- World Cinema Documentary Special Jury Award for Best Cinematography – Pieter-Jan De Pue for The Land of the Enlightened
- World Cinema Documentary Special Jury Award for Editing – Mako Kamitsuna and John Maringouin for We Are X
- Audience Award: Dramatic – The Birth of a Nation (2016 film) by Nate Parker
- Audience Award: Documentary – Jim: The James Foley Story by Brian Oakes
- World Cinema Audience Award: Dramatic – Between Sea and Land by Manolo Cruz and Carlos del Castillo
- World Cinema Audience Award: Documentary – Sonita by Rokhsareh Ghaemmaghami
- Best of NEXT Audience Award – First Girl I Loved by Kerem Sanga
- Short Film Grand Jury Prize – Thunder Road by Jim Cummings
- Short Film Jury Award: US Fiction – The Procedure by Calvin Lee Reeder
- Short Film Jury Award: International Fiction – Maman(s) by Maïmouna Doucouré
- Short Film Jury Award: Non-fiction – Bacon and God's Wrath by Sol Friedman
- Short Film Jury Award: Animation – Edmond by Nina Gantz
- Short Film Special Jury Award for Outstanding Performance – Grace Glowicki for Her Friend Adam
- Short Film Special Jury Award for Best Direction – Ondřej Hudeček for Peacock
- Alfred P. Sloan Prize – Embrace of the Serpent by Ciro Guerra

== Films ==
=== U.S. Dramatic Competition ===
- As You Are by Miles Joris-Peyrafitte
- Christine by Antonio Campos
- Equity by Meera Menon
- Goat by Andrew Neel
- Joshy by Jeff Baena
- Lovesong by So Yong Kim
- Morris from America by Chad Hartigan
- Other People by Chris Kelly
- Southside With You by Richard Tanne
- Spa Night by Andrew Ahn
- Swiss Army Man by The Daniels
- Tallulah by Sian Heder
- The Birth of a Nation by Nate Parker
- The Free World by Jason Lew
- The Intervention by Clea DuVall
- White Girl by Elizabeth Wood

=== U.S. Documentary Competition ===
- Audrie & Daisy by Bonni Cohen, Jon Shenk
- Author: The JT LeRoy Story by Jeff Feuerzeig
- The Bad Kids by Keith Fulton & Lou Pepe
- Gleason by Clay Tweel
- Holy Hell by Will Allen
- How to Let Go of the World (and Love All the Things Climate Can’t Change) by Josh Fox
- Jim: The James Foley Story by Brian Oakes
- Kate Plays Christine by Robert Greene
- Kiki by Sara Jordenö
- Life, Animated by Roger Ross Williams
- Newtown by Kim A. Snyder
- NUTS! by Penny Lane
- Suited by Jason Benjamin
- Trapped by Dawn Porter
- Uncle Howard by Aaron Brookner
- Weiner by Josh Kriegman & Elyse Steinberg

=== Premieres ===
- Agnus Dei by Anne Fontaine
- Ali and Nino by Asif Kapadia
- Captain Fantastic by Matt Ross
- Certain Women by Kelly Reichardt
- Complete Unknown by Joshua Marston
- Frank & Lola by Matthew Ross
- Hunt for the Wilderpeople by Taika Waititi
- Indignation by James Schamus
- Jacqueline Argentine by Bernardo Britto
- Little Men by Ira Sachs
- Love and Friendship by Whit Stillman
- Operation Avalanche by Matt Johnson
- Manchester by the Sea by Kenneth Lonergan
- Mr. Pig by Diego Luna
- Sing Street by John Carney
- Sophie and the Rising Sun by Maggie Greenwald
- The Fundamentals of Caring by Rob Burnett
- The Hollars by John Krasinski
- Wiener-Dog by Todd Solondz

=== Midnight ===
- 31 by Rob Zombie
- Antibirth by Danny Perez
- The Blackout Experiments by Rich Fox
- Carnage Park by Mickey Keating
- The Greasy Strangler by Jim Hosking
- Outlaws and Angels by JT Mollner
- Trash Fire by Richard Bates, Jr.
- Under the Shadow by Babak Anvari
- Yoga Hosers by Kevin Smith

=== World Cinema Dramatic Competition ===
- Belgica by Felix van Groeningen
- Between Sea and Land by Manolo Cruz & Carlos del Castillo
- Brahman Naman by Qaushiq Mukherjee
- A Good Wife by Mirjana Karanović
- Halal Love (and Sex) by Assad Fouladkar
- The Lure by Agnieszka Smoczynska
- Male Joy, Female Love by Yao Huang
- Mammal by Rebecca Daly
- My Friend from the Park by Ana Katz
- Much Ado About Nothing by Alejandro Fernández Almendras
- Sand Storm by Elite Zexer
- Wild by Nicolette Krebitz

=== World Cinema Documentary Competition ===
- All These Sleepless Nights by Michal Marczak
- A Flag Without a Country by Bahman Ghobadi
- Hooligan Sparrow by Nanfu Wang
- The Land of the Enlightened by Pieter-Jan De Pue
- The Lovers and the Despot by Robert Cannan & Ross Adam
- Plaza de la Soledad by Maya Goded
- The Settlers by Shimon Dotan
- Sky Ladder: The Art of Cai Guo-Qiang by Kevin Macdonald
- Sonita by Rokhsareh Ghaemmaghami
- We Are X by Stephen Kijak
- When Two Worlds Collide by Heidi Brandenburg & Mathew Orzel

== Juries ==
Jury members, for each program of the festival, including the Alfred P. Sloan Jury, which also took part in the Science in Film Forum Panel, were announced on January 12, 2016.

U.S. Documentary Jury

- Simon Kilmurry*
- Jill Lepore*
- Shola Lynch*
- Louie Psihoyos*
- Amy Ziering*

U.S. Dramatic Jury

- Lena Dunham*
- Jon Hamm*
- Avy Kaufman*
- Randall Poster*
- Franklin Leonard*

World Documentary Jury

- Mila Aung-Thwin*
- Tine Fischer*
- Asif Kapadia*

World Dramatic Jury

- Mark Adams*
- Fernanda Solorzano*
- Apichatpong Weerasethakul*

Alfred P. Sloan Jury

- Kerry Bishé
- Mike Cahill
- Shane Carruth
- Clifford Johnson
- Ting Wu

Short Film Jury

- Keegan-Michael Key
- Gina Kwon
- Amy Nicholson

== Acquisitions ==
Ahead of the festival opening distributor Netflix obtained worldwide streaming rights to Tallulah and Iranian horror film Under the Shadow. Oscilloscope Laboratories also obtained U.S. distribution rights to The Fits before its Sundance debut. Amazon also acquired the rights to Manchester by the Sea and Love & Friendship, later releasing both films in association with Roadside Attractions.
