= Fameplay.tv =

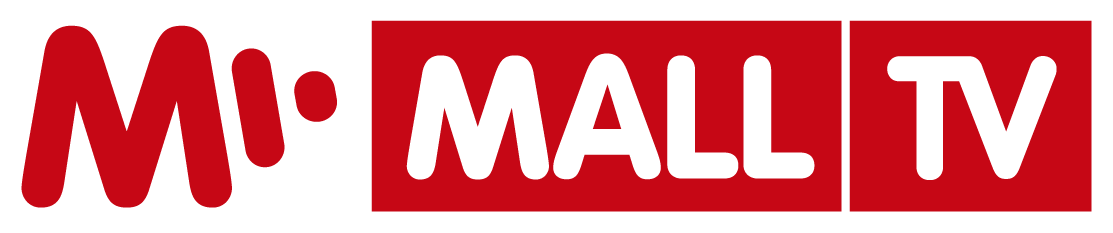
MALL TV Logo

Fameplay.tv (formerly MALL.TV) is a Czech internet television. It was created by almost the entire former Stream.cz team headed by chief producer Lukáš Záhoř, manager Juraj Felix and investor Jakub Havrlant.

== History ==
Preparations for MALL.TV started in January 2018. First programs and series were presented by the television at the 53rd Karlovy Vary International Film Festival in July of the same year. The broadcast itself began on 7 October 2018. Slovak localization was launched in autumn 2019.

MALL.TV was created as part of Mall Group, the first e-commerce group in the Central and Eastern Europe to bet on the production of its own live work. The chief producer of internet television is Lukáš Záhoř, the creative producer is Milan Kuchynka and the chief dramaturg is Martin Krušina. During the first three years of its existence, MALL.TV's shows and series won a number of awards, including two of the most prestigious for local and global series production - the eight-part thriller #martyisdead won the Czech Lion for Outstanding Audiovisual Achievement and the International Emmy in the short series category. MALL.TV is operated by Czech Video Center since 2021.

In April 2023, MALL.TV changed its name to Fameplay.tv and changed its visual identity, which was created by Najbrt studio. This happened in connection with the sale of Mall Group to Allegro and the associated expiration of the license to use the MALL.TV brand.

== Availability ==
Fameplay.tv is available for free via the web platform, mobile and smart TV applications. Some programs and series, or their selected episodes, can also be found on the Fameplay.tv YouTube channel.
