= Sonita Alizadeh =

Afghan rapper and activist (born November 1996)

- سونیتا علیزاده
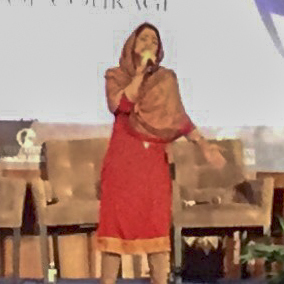
- Alizadeh in 2016
- Born: 11 November 1996 (age 29); Herat, Afghanistan
- Other names: Sonita
- Occupation: Rapper
- Years active: 2014–present
- Known for: Rapping for Afghan women's rights

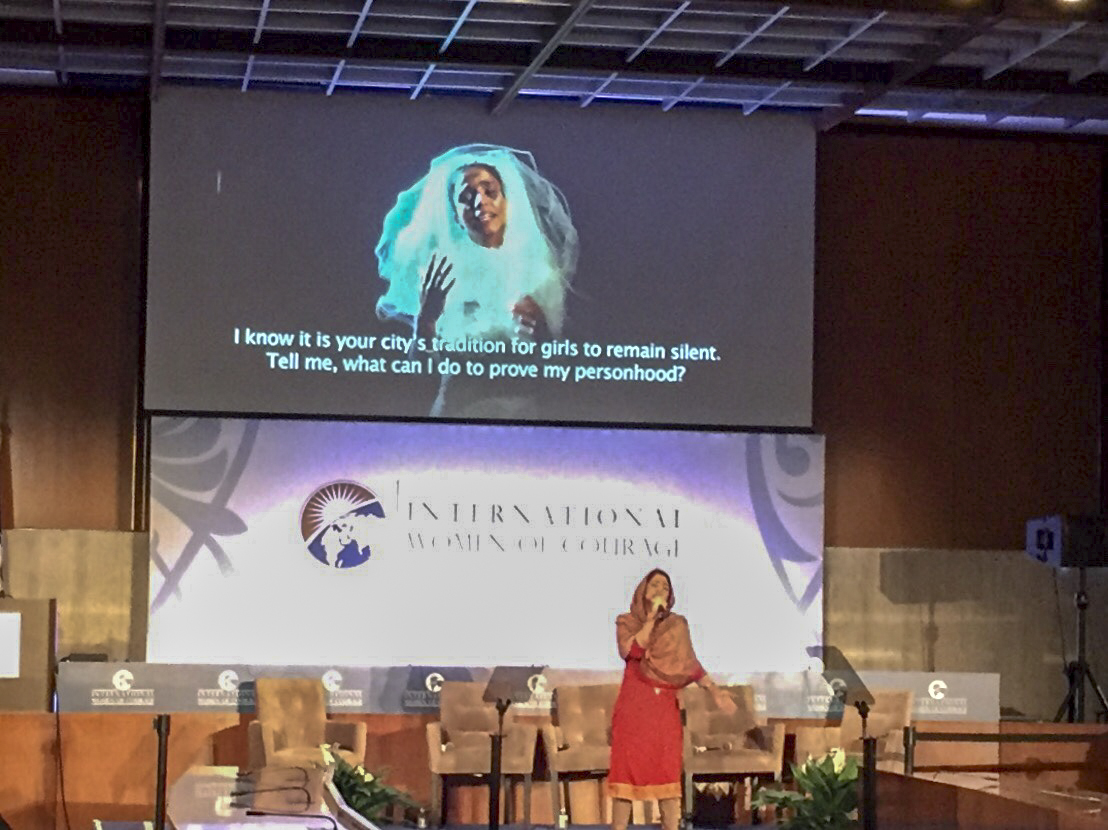
Sonita Alizadeh performs at the 2016 International Women of Courage forum at the U.S. Department of State in Washington, D.C.

External videos
- “Sonita ...brides for sale”, Sonita Alizadeh
- “Watch rapper Sonita Alizadeh perform live in New York City“, Women in the World
- “Meet Afghanistan's youngest female rapper, Sonita Alizadeh“, Women in the World

Sonita Alizadeh (Dari: سونیتا علیزاده; born 11 November 1996) is an Afghan rapper and activist who has been vocal against forced marriages. Alizadeh first gained attention when she released "Brides for Sale," a video in which she raps about daughters being sold into marriage by their families. With the help of Rokhsareh Ghaem Maghami, an Iranian documentary filmmaker who over three years documented her story in the film Sonita, Alizadeh filmed the video to escape a marriage her parents were planning for her, even though it is illegal for women to sing solo in Iran, where she was living at the time. After releasing the video on YouTube, Alizadeh was contacted by the Strongheart Group, which offered her a student visa and financial help to come and study in the United States, where she then relocated and has resided since. In 2015, she was listed as one of BBC's 100 Women.

== Biography ==
=== Early life ===
Alizadeh grew up in Herat, Afghanistan, under the rule of the Taliban. Her family first considered selling her as a bride when she was 10. Alizadeh has said that at the time, she did not fully understand what that meant. Instead, her family fled to Iran to escape the Taliban. In Iran, Alizadeh worked by cleaning bathrooms, while she taught herself to read and write. During this time, she also discovered the music of Iranian rapper Yas and American rapper Eminem. Inspired by their music, she started writing her own songs. In 2014, Alizadeh entered a U.S. competition to write a song to get Afghan people to vote in their elections. She won a $1,000 prize, which Alizadeh sent to her mother, who had moved back to Afghanistan.

=== "Brides for Sale" ===
Shortly after winning the competition, Alizadeh's mother sent for her to return to Afghanistan, saying she had found a man to buy her. She was 16. Her mother was trying to earn a $9,000 dowry so that her elder brother could purchase a bride, and thought she could get at least $9,000 by selling her daughter. After Rokhsareh Ghaemmaghami, director of the documentary Sonita, paid $2,000 to Sonita's mother and asked for six months of time for Sonita, she wrote "Brides for Sale" and Rokhsareh Ghaem Maghami filmed the music video, which gained international attention. The video was not only popular with women in Afghanistan, but also drew the attention of the nonprofit Strongheart Group, which arranged to bring Alizadeh to the U.S. Sonita, as she is known in her school environment, came to the United States and received her high school diploma from Wasatch Academy, an international college preparatory boarding school.

=== Present ===
Alizadeh graduated from Bard College in 2023. In 2022, she was awarded a 2023 Rhodes Scholarship.

== In popular media ==
A documentary, called Sonita, premiered at the International Documentary Filmfestival Amsterdam in November 2015.

The film gained positive reviews. The film was entered into the Sundance Film Festival and won the World Cinema Grand Jury Prize for a documentary film. The film also showed at the Seattle International Film Festival in 2016, and Seattle alt-weekly The Stranger designated it a "don't miss" feature.

== Filmography ==
Year	Title	Role	Notes
2015	Sonita	Self	Documentary; 2016 Sundance Film Festival -World Cinema Jury Prize: Documentary -World Cinema Audience Award: Documentary

== Awards ==
- 2017: Asia Game Changer Awards
- 2018: MTV Europe Music Awards- Generation Change Award
- 2021: Freedom Prize
- 2021: Muhammad Ali Humanitarian Awards Six Core Principle Winner for Conviction
