= All These Sleepless Nights =

2016 Polish docufictional film by Michał Marczak

- Polish: Wszystkie nieprzespane noce
- Directed by: Michał Marczak
- Written by: Michał Marczak; Katarzyna Szczerba
- Produced by: Thomas Benski; Marta Golba; Julia Nottingham; Lucas Ochoa
- Starring: Krzysztof Baginski; Michal Huszcza; Eva Lebuef
- Cinematography: Michał Marczak; Maciej Twardowski
- Edited by: Dorota Wardeszkiewicz
- Music by: Lubomir Grzelak
- Production companies: Endorfina Studio; Pulse Films; Studio PUK
- Distributed by: The Orchard; GEM Entertainment; I Wonder Pictures; The Criterion Channel
- Release dates: January 2016 (Sundance); April 7, 2017 (United States)
- Running time: 100 minutes
- Countries: Poland, United Kingdom
- Language: Polish
- Box office: $20,762

All These Sleepless Nights (Polish: Wszystkie nieprzespane noce) is a 2016 Polish docufictional film by Michał Marczak. Shot over a year and a half, the film focuses on real life friends Krzysztof Baginski and Michal Huszcza as they party around Warsaw and how their relationship struggles when Baginski begins a relationship with Eva Lebeuf, the French-Polish ex-girlfriend of Huszcza.

The film premiered at the 2016 Sundance Film Festival where Marczak won the directing prize in the World Cinema - Documentary category. While the film went on to play various documentary festivals around the world, Marczak was openly indifferent to the idea of categorizing his film as a documentary, giving various interviews in which he talked about how certain scenes in the film were staged.

== Plot ==
Told in a non-linear fashion the film follows Krzysztof Baginski and Michal Huszcza, friends and roommates who go to parties and try to meet girls. At a party on the beach, Huszcza introduces Baginski to Eva Lebeuf. Baginski quickly falls for Lebeuf and the two begin a relationship. When tensions arise between the two friends Baginski decides to move out and gets an apartment for himself, moving Lebeuf in with him. Their relationship eventually dissolves and Baginski is left with a crushing sense of loneliness which he struggles to overcome. Nevertheless, Baginski later refers to the past year as the most important of his life.

== Production ==
Michał Marczak conceived of the film after witnessing how the generation after him was more liberal in their thinking. He spent a year scouring the Warsaw night scene eventually finding real life friends Krzysztof Baginski and Michal Huszcza who were both art students at the time of filming. Marczak spent several months preparing the film with Baginski and Huszcza, encouraging them to take improv classes.

== Style ==
The film was marketed as a documentary, but director Michał Marczak resisted labelling the movie as such, admitting that while the participants in the film were not actors and the relationships were real, certain scenes were somewhat staged.

Though the six month relationship between Baginski and Eva Lebeuf that was portrayed in the film actually occurred, Marczak orchestrated the on-camera meeting between Baginski and Lebeuf believing that she could potentially be an interesting presence in the film. Marczak and Lebeuf had previously been in a relationship and at the start of filming he was unaware that Lebuef had previously also had a relationship with Huszcza which later became a central conflict in the film.

After Marczak filmed a scene in which Krzysztof Baginski was mocked by one of his friends for being an awkward dancer Marczak hired a choreographer to work with him on his movements so that the progression of his dancing throughout the film would create a more linear narrative.

Marczak served as cinematographer for the film and shot it using mostly available light though he occasionally would stage a scene before filming before shooting began. He also custom created a rig using a 3-D printer in order to make his camera as light-weight and unobtrusive as possible Krzysztof Baginski also worked as a camera assistant on the film.

Marczak credited his editor, Dorota Vardeszkiewicz with helping to develop the cinematic language of the movie and also for encouraging him to give the film a non-linear narrative.

== Reception ==
The film has a score of 67% on review aggregator Rotten Tomatoes and a score of 70% on Metacritic indicating generally positive reviews.
