= Sand Storm (2016 film) =

2016 Israeli film

- Film poster
- סופת חול
- Directed by: Elite Zexer
- Written by: Elite Zexer
- Starring: Lamis Ammar; Ruba Blal
- Release dates: 25 January 2016 (Sundance); 15 September 2016 (Israel)
- Running time: 87 minutes
- Country: Israel
- Language: Arabic
- Box office: $86,800

Sand Storm (Hebrew: סופת חול Sufat Chol) is a 2016 Arabic-language Israeli coming-of-age film directed by Elite Zexer. It was shown in the Panorama section at the 66th Berlin International Film Festival. At the 2016 Sundance Film Festival it won the Grand Jury Prize in the World Cinema Dramatic section. It won the Best Film Award at the Ophir Awards. It was selected as the Israeli entry for the Best Foreign Language Film at the 89th Academy Awards but it was not nominated.

The film is set in a Bedouin village in southern Israel and is Elite Zexer's directorial debut.

== Cast ==
- Lamis Ammar as Layla
- Ruba Blal as Jalila
- Hitham Omari as Suliman
- Khadija Al Akel as Tasnim
- Jalal Masrwa as Anwar

== See also ==
- List of submissions to the 89th Academy Awards for Best Foreign Language Film
- List of Israeli submissions for the Academy Award for Best Foreign Language Film
