= Bernardo Britto =

Brazilian film director

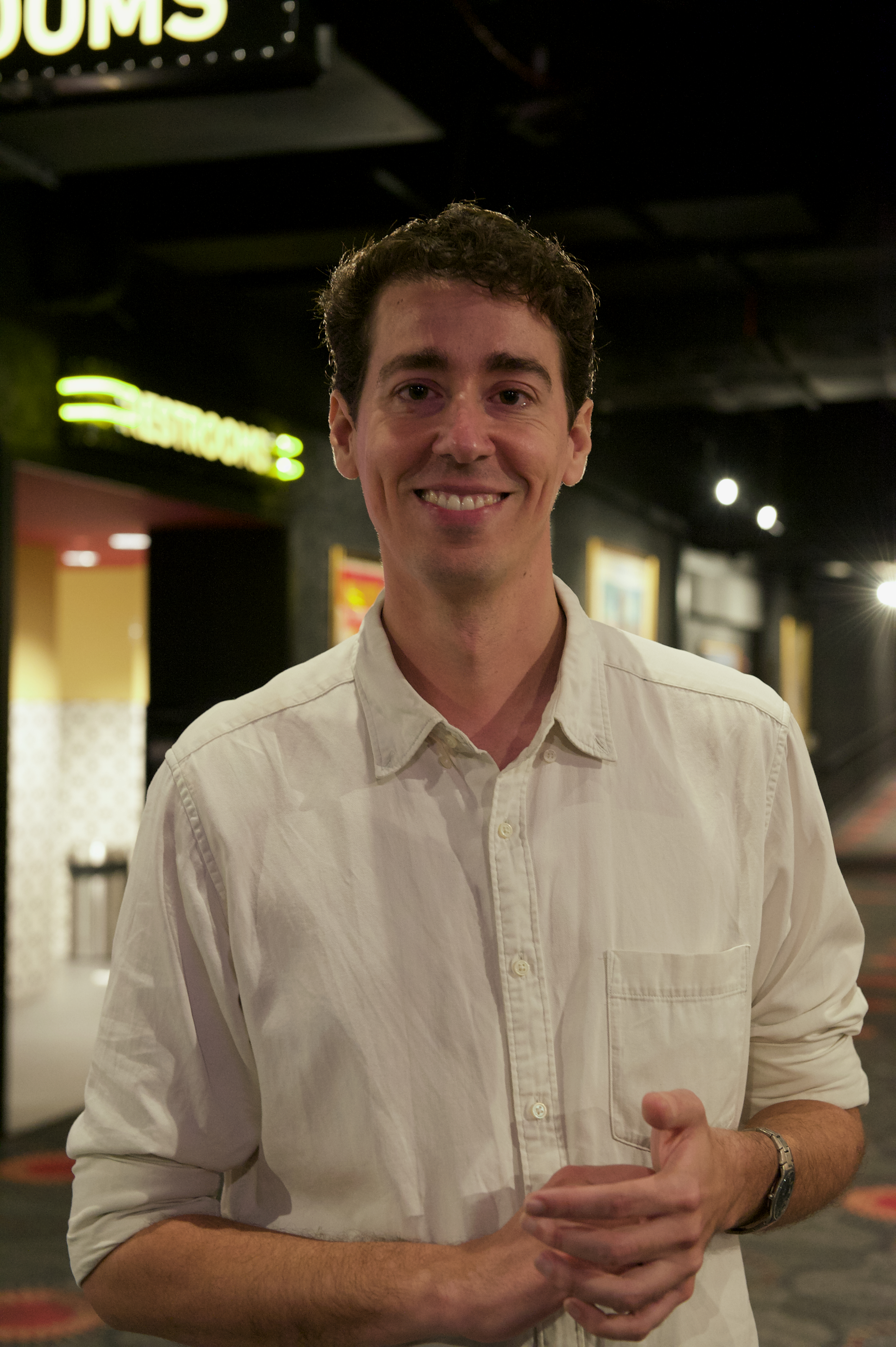
- Britto in 2024
- Occupation(s): Director, screenwriter
- Years active: 2009-present

Bernardo Britto is a Brazilian film director and screenwriter. He has directed the short films Places Where We Lived (2013), Yearbook (2014), Glove (2016), and Hudson Geese (2020), and the feature-length films Jacqueline Argentine (2016), and Omni Loop (2024).

== Early life ==
Britto was born in Rio de Janeiro, Brazil, and grew up in South Florida. He attended New York University Tisch School of the Arts.

== Career ==
Britto directed the short films Places Where We Lived which had its world premiere at South by Southwest in March 2013, Yearbook which premiered at the 2014 Sundance Film Festival winning the Short Film Jury Award for Animation, Glove which he co-directed with Alexa Lim Haas. and Hudson Geese which premiered at the 2020 Sundance Film Festival and was released as part of Cake on FXX.

In 2016, Britto directed Jacqueline Argentine which had its world premiere at the 2016 Sundance Film Festival, and was distributed by Gunpowder & Sky. In 2024, Britto directed Omni Loop starring Mary-Louise Parker and Ayo Edebiri which had its world premiere at South by Southwest.
