= Beit-HaGefen Arab Jewish Culture Center =

Multi-cultural organisation in Haifa, Israel

Beit Ha'Gefen Arab Jewish Cultural Center
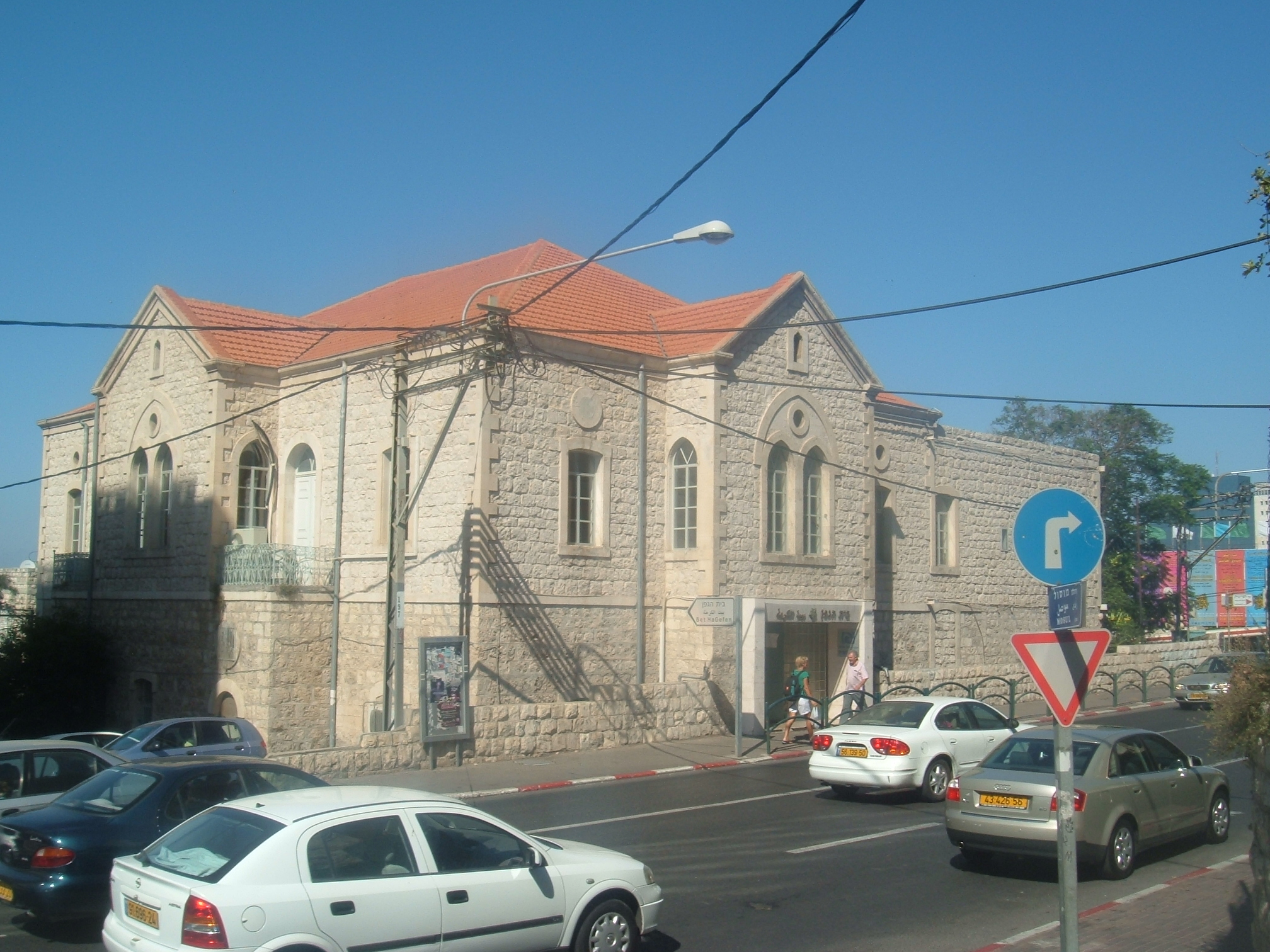
- Beit Ha'Gefen's main building
- Founded: 1963
- Type: Non-profit
- Purpose: Promote Arab-Jewish Shared Society
- Location: Haifa, Israel
- Coordinates: 32°48′58″N 34°59′31″E
- Website: www.beit-hagefen.com

Beit Ha'Gefen Arab-Jewish Cultural Center in Haifa, Israel, is a multi-cultural organization that aims to bring together Arabs and Jews and promote coexistence and tolerance.

== Organisation ==
Beit Ha'Gefen — The Arab-Jewish Cultural Center organizes and promotes interfaith social and cultural events. The center was established in 1963 by Haifa mayor Abba Hushi. Activities of the center include guided tours around Haifa, themed on coexistence, conferences and different cultural events. Center maintains Arab Language theatre, which is the oldest such theatre in Israel Beit Ha'Gefen is an organiser of two major cultural events in Haifa: Holiday of Holidays in December, which is a celebration of Ramadan, Christmas and Hanukka together; and Arab Theater month in summer. Holiday of Holidays was first celebrated in December 1994, when all three Jewish, Muslim and Christian holidays happened at the same time. The main venue of this fortnight event is Wadi Nisnas neighbourhood, on outskirt of which Beit Ha'Gefen is located. Until the Oslo Agreement, center activities were mostly local and after concluding the agreement, Beit Ha'Gefen started international activities, including establishing ties with similar organisations in Jordan, Morocco and Palestine. The center is also engaged in the interfaith movement, providing a platform for regular meeting between representatives of three major monotheistic religions. Every two years, Beit Ha'Gefen organizes an interfaith conference, with participation of Muslim, Christian, Jewish, Baháʼí and Druze clerics and religious authorities. Beit Ha'Gefen has six departments: the Culture department, Contemporary Art Gallery, El Karama Theater, Visitor Center, Dialog and Program Center and The Clore Library and Cultural Center for children.

== Art Gallery ==
Beit Ha'Gefen also operates a contemporary Art Gallery that hosts multiple exhibitions per year that are related to tolerance and coexistence. In December 2018, Beit-HaGefen Art Gallery inaugurated a new interactive gallery wing - "The Third Space"

=== Notable exhibitions ===
- 2013 Homage to Lutfia, my sister in Yarmouk refugee camp. Solo of Amir Abdi. Curated by Ayelet Zohar.
- 2013 The Beyond Within Exhibition of Boodi and George, Vered Nissim. Curated by Raafat Hattab.
- 2014 Inbetween Group exhibition. Curated by Yeala Hazut and Farid Abu Shaḳrah
- 2014 Picture Peace Group exhibition of Israeli and Palestinian artists for promoting peace.
- 2015 Journal View – A Journal Photography Exhibition. Group exhibition of Israeli and Palestinian photographers.
- 2015 Dear Jerusalem. Solo of Guy Briller. Curated by Yeala Hazut.
- 2016 Depth of field. Group exhibition in collaboration with Bezalel Academy of Arts and Design. Curated by Dor Guez and Yeala Hazut.
- 2017 Ghost Dance. Group exhibition by Aya Abu Roken, Nour Ibrahim, Lamis Ammar, Ruba Salameh, Nardin Srouji, Hanna Qubti. Curated by Fadwa Naamna.
