= Michał Marczak =

Polish director and cinematographer

Michal Marczak
- Born: August 11, 1982 (age 43)
- Education: California Institute of the Arts
- Notable work: Closure (2026 film), All These Sleepless Nights

Michał Marczak is a Polish director and cinematographer.

== Education ==
Marczak studied philosophy at Warsaw University and photography at the Academy of Fine Arts in Poznań.

== Career ==
Marczak's feature directorial debut was the 2010 documentary At the Edge of Russia.

He followed that film up with the 2012 film Fuck for Forest which documents the Fuck for Forest movement, a not for profit Norwegian group that creates pornography with the profits going towards environmental causes.

After finishing Fuck for Forest Marczak began looking for his next project. As he entered his 30s he began to feel a difference between his generation and the next one and began to conceive of a documentary that focused on youth born after 1989. Marczak spent several months scouting for locations and meeting people searching for potential subjects. He eventually met friends Krzysztof Baginski and Michal Huszcza who were both art students and decided to focus his film around them spending three months prepping them to appear in his film. The film developed into All These Sleepless Nights which was a partial documentary with some scenes staged by Marczak. The film premiered at the 2016 Sundance Film Festival where Marczak won the directing prize in the World Cinema - Documentary category.

His 2026 documentary Closure, which began when he was scouting locations on the Vistula River and met the film's subject, who was searching for his missing son, debuted at the Sundance Film Festival and won a Golden Alexander Award at the Thessaloniki Documentary Festival.

== Filmography ==
- At the Edge of Russia (2010)
- Fuck for Forest (2012)
- All These Sleepless Nights (2016)
- Closure (2026 film)
