= Pause (2018 film) =

Cypriot drama film

- Poster
- Directed by: Tonia Mishiali
- Written by: Tonia Mishiali; Anna Fotiadou
- Produced by: Andros Achilleas; Panos Bisdas; Stelana Kliris; Tonia Mishiali; Ioanna Soultani
- Starring: Stella Fyrogeni; Andreas Vasileiou; Popi Avraam
- Cinematography: Yorgos Rahmatoulin
- Edited by: Emilios Avraam
- Music by: Julian Scherle
- Production companies: A.B. Seahorse Films; SOUL Productions; Cyprus Film Advisory Board
- Distributed by: Subliminal Films
- Release date: 4 July 2018 (KVIFF)
- Running time: 96 minutes
- Countries: Cyprus; Greece
- Language: Greek

Pause (Greek: Παύση, romanized: Pafsi) is a 2018 Cypriot drama film directed by Tonia Mishiali, who co-wrote the screenplay with Anna Fotiadou. It stars Stella Fyrogeni, Andreas Vasileiou, and Popi Avraam. It received generally positive reviews from critics and audiences.

== Premise ==
Upon reaching menopause, a Cypriot housewife's decision to no longer tolerate her husband's abuse and disrespect leads her into a world of violent and disturbing daydreams, though reality and fantasy soon begin to blur.

== Cast ==
- Stella Fyrogeni as Elpida
  - Oriana Mantzouranou as Young Elpida
- Andreas Vasileiou as Costas
- Popi Avraam as Eleftheria
- Marios Ioannou as a doctor
- Prokopis Agathokleous as a young man
- Marina Mandri as a young woman
- Georgina Tatsi as Irini
- Andrey Pilipenko as a painter

== Production ==
The film's working title of Menopause was changed to Pause during filming. During development, the film was selected for consideration at two German co-production workshops in 2015: the Mannheim Meeting Place at the Mannheim-Heidelberg International Film Festival and the Connecting Cottbus at the Cottbus International Film Festival. It was filmed in and around Nicosia throughout February and March 2017.

== Release ==
Pause premiered at the 2018 Karlovy Vary International Film Festival as part of the "East of the West" programme. The Hollywood Reporter called it "a work of considerable tonal complexity, as it stirs moments of pitch-black humor and short and violent reveries into an otherwise austerely told tale of spousal strife that wants to smash the patriarchy with feats of cinematic derring-do".

In the book What Fresh Hell Is This?: Perimenopause, Menopause, Other Indignities and You (2021), author Heather Corinna noted that Pause offered "one of the rare sympathetic descriptions of a menopausal mental health struggle". The film has a 100% score on Rotten Tomatoes based off twelve reviews.

On Letterboxd, Pause has a 3.4/5 average rating based off 470 user ratings. The film has a 6.6/10 rating on IMbD based on 793 user ratings.
