= Maricel Álvarez =

Argentine actress

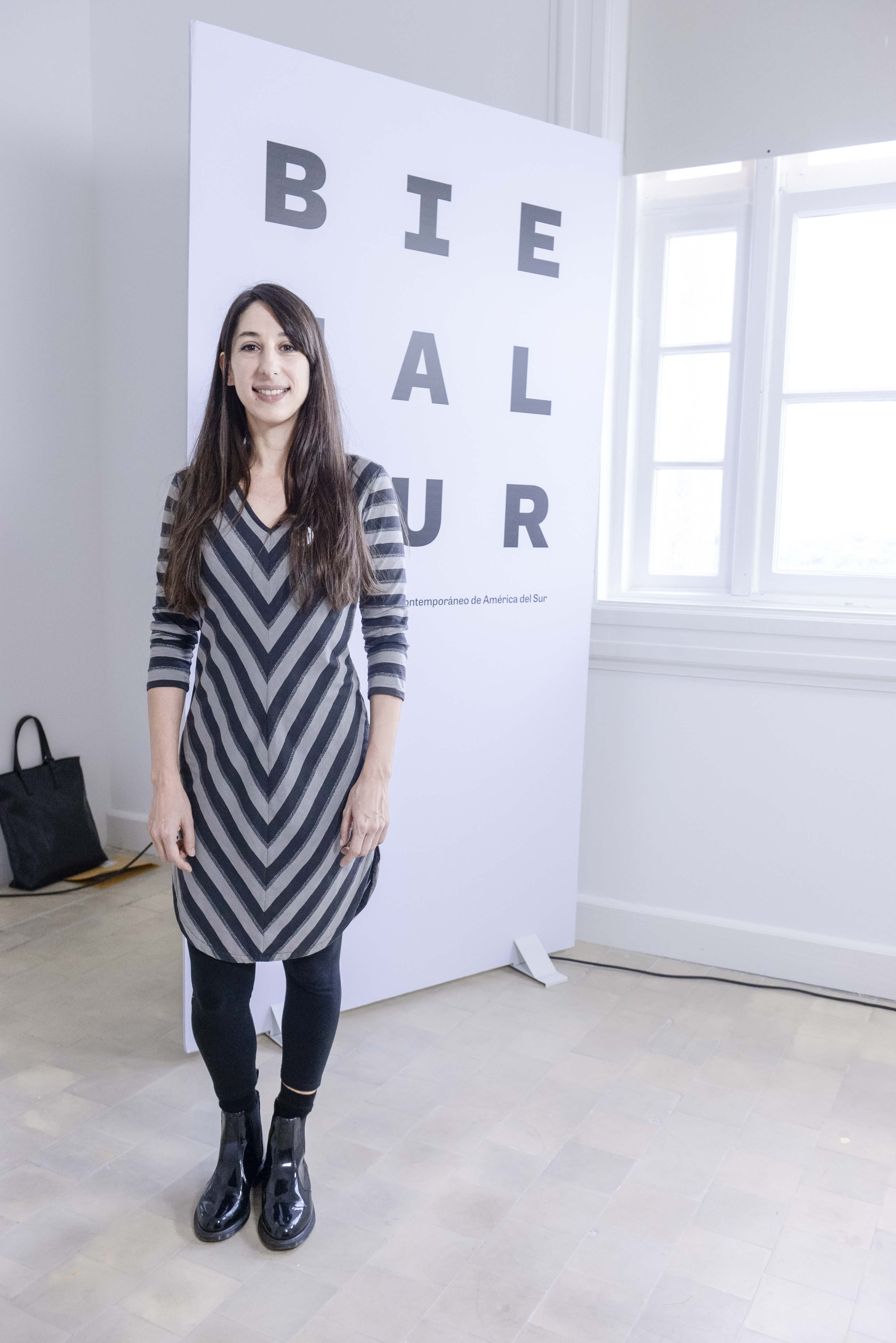
Maricel Álvarez in 2016

Maricel Álvarez is an Argentine actress. Her film credits include Biutiful, Sunstrokes, To Rome With Love and Un Traductor.

== Filmography ==
- 1997: Little Miracles
- 2010: Biutiful
- 2011: Fatherland
- 2012: To Rome with Love
- 2012: The Man of Your Dreams (TV-Series, 1 episode)
- 2012: Vinyl Days
- 2013: Paradise for the Damned
- 2014: Sunstrokes
- 2015: My Friend from the Park
- 2017: Vergel
- 2017: Toublanc
- 2018: A Translator
- 2021: Dusk Stone
- 2022: Conversations on Hatred
