= Elite Zexer =

Israeli film director and writer

- עילית זקצר
- Born: Netanya, Israel
- Occupation(s): Director, Writer
- Years active: 2008–present

Elite Zexer (Hebrew: עילית זקצר; born December 4) is an Israeli film director and writer. She is best known for her work on the films Sand Storm, Tasnim and more. In 2016, she won best director and best film at the Ophir Award.

== Life and career ==
Elite grew up in Herzliya, Israel. She holds a BFA and MFA degrees from the Tel Aviv University. She is also working as a professor at the Tel Aviv University.

In 2008, she wrote and directed Take Note, which won the Best Fiction Film Award at the Tel Aviv International Student Film Festival. Her first feature film Sand Storm won the grand jury prize at the 2016 Sundance Film Festival, Ophir Award and it was the Israeli submission for the Oscar entry for 2016.

== Filmography ==
Year	Film	Writer	Director	Notes
2016	Sand Storm	✓	✓	Feature Film
2010	Fire Department, Bnei-Brak	✓	✓	Documentary
2010	Tasnim	✓	✓	Short Film
2008	Take Note	✓	✓	Short Film

== Awards and nominations ==
Year	Result	Award	Category	Work
2010	Won	Tel Aviv International Student Film Festival	Best Short Film	Take Note
2010	Won	International Women's Film Festival	Best Fiction Film	Tasnim
2016	Won	2016 Sundance Film Festival	World Cinema Grand Jury Prize: Dramatic	Sand Storm
2016	Won	Ophir Award	Best Feature Film Best Director	Sand Storm

== See also ==
- List of submissions to the 89th Academy Awards for Best Foreign Language Film
- List of Israeli submissions for the Academy Award for Best Foreign Language Film
