= Closure (2026 film) =

2026 Polish documentary film

- Directed by: Michał Marczak
- Produced by: Michał Marczak; Monika Braid; Remi Grellety; Katarzyna Szczerba; Karolina Marczak
- Cinematography: Michal Marczak
- Edited by: Anna Garncarczyk
- Distributed by: Autlook Films (Poland); 1-2 Special (United States)
- Release dates: 23 January 2026 (Sundance); 28 October 2026 (United States)
- Running time: 105 minutes
- Country: Poland
- Language: Polish
- Box office: $7,012

Closure is a 2026 Polish documentary film directed and produced by Michał Marczak, with producers Monika Braid, Remi Grellety, Katarzyna Szczerba, and Karolina Marczak.

The film had its world premiere in the World Cinema Documentary Competition at the 2026 Sundance Film Festival. It received widespread praise from critics.

== Premise ==
After his teenage son, Krzysztof Dymiński, goes missing in May 2023, Daniel searches Poland's Vistula River, torn between fear that his son is dead and hope that he may still be alive. CCTV footage taken on the morning of his disappearance shows Krzysztof standing on a bridge, but not whether he jumped or walked away, and Daniel continues to investigate long after the police and local media have stopped searching.

Except for a final shot, the film uses no images of Krzysztof. The film's soundtrack includes a snippet of William Basinski's "The Disintegration Loops," which plays over the final scenes.

== Release ==
Closure premiered in the World Cinema Documentary Competition at the 2026 Sundance Film Festival. It has also screened at the True/False Film Festival, the Thessaloniki Documentary Festival, and Millennium Docs Against Gravity. It won Thessaloniki's Golden Alexander International Competition prize.

The film will compete at the 21st Rome Film Festival in 'Progressive Cinema Competition - Visions for the World of Tomorrow' in October 2026.

== Production ==
Marczak began filming after encountering Daniel while location scouting by the Vistula River for a planned fiction feature film and joining the search for Daniel's missing son. The project was selected for the Thessaloniki Pitching Forum at the Thessaloniki Documentary Festival's Agora industry program in 2025.

== Reception ==
On review aggregator Rotten Tomatoes, the film holds an approval rating of 100% based on 17 reviews, with an average rating of 7.8/10. On Metacritic, the film has a weighted average score of 80 out of 100, based on eight critics, indicating "universal acclaim".
