= Fits and Starts (film) =

- Directed by: Laura Terruso
- Written by: Laura Terruso
- Produced by: Margherita Arco; Neda Armian; Laura Terruso
- Starring: Wyatt Cenac; Greta Lee; Maria Dizzia
- Cinematography: Benjamin Rutkowski
- Edited by: Robert Grigsby Wilson
- Music by: Jay Israelson
- Production companies: Free Architect Film; Armian Pictures
- Release date: March 10, 2017 (South by Southwest)
- Running time: 80 minutes
- Country: United States
- Language: English

Fits and Starts is a 2017 American comedy film written and directed by Laura Terruso and starring Wyatt Cenac, Greta Lee and Maria Dizzia.

== Cast ==
- Wyatt Cenac as David
- Louis Cancelmi as Daniel
- Greta Lee as Jennifer
- Maria Dizzia as Sawyer Edwards
- Alex Karpovsky as Charles
- Ben Sinclair as Parking Attendant
- Larry Murphy as McDannell
- Sam Seder as Dressler
- Diane Ciesla as Lily Geist
- Buzz Bovshow as Bernard Geist
- Michael Cyril Creighton as Richard Pringle
- Matt Dellapina as Jordan Roth
- Jennifer Prediger as Shopper

== Reception ==
The film has a 67% critics rating and a 92% audience rating on Rotten Tomatoes.
