= Window Boy Would Also Like to Have a Submarine =

- Theatrical release poster
- Directed by: Alex Piperno
- Written by: Alex Piperno
- Produced by: Alex Piperno; Esteban Lucangioli; Araquén Rodríguez; Rachel Ellis; Frank Hoeve; Armi Rae Cacacnindin
- Starring: Daniel Quiroga; Inés Bortagaray
- Cinematography: Manuel Rebella
- Edited by: Karen Akerman; Alex Piperno; Alejo Santos
- Music by: Lucas Larriera
- Production companies: BALDR Film; ACC Cinematografica Films; Desvia Produções; La Pobladora Cine; Pelicano Cine
- Release dates: February 23, 2020 (Berlinale); December 10, 2020 (Uruguay)
- Running time: 85 minutes
- Countries: Uruguay; Argentina; Brazil; Netherlands; Philippines
- Languages: Filipino; Spanish

Window Boy Would Also Like to Have a Submarine (Spanish: Chico ventana también quisiera tener un submarino) is a 2020 experimental fantasy romantic comedy film written and directed by Alex Piperno in his directorial debut. It stars Daniel Quiroga and Inés Bortagaray. The film was named on the shortlist for Uruguayan's entry for the Academy Award for Best International Feature Film at the 93rd Academy Awards, but it was not selected.

== Synopsis ==
On board a cruise ship that runs through southern Latin America, a young sailor discovers a door that mysteriously leads to an apartment in Montevideo. Meanwhile, thousands of kilometers away, in the outskirts of a small rural town in the Philippine rice terraces, a group of peasants seem to have found an old abandoned hut on top of a hill, to which they attribute causes. supernatural.

== Cast ==
The actors participating in this film are:

- Daniel Quiroga as Window Boy
- Inés Bortagaray as Elsa
- Noli Tobol as Noli

== Release ==
It had its world premiere on February 23, 2020, at the 70th Berlin International Film Festival. It was commercially released on December 10, 2020, in Uruguayan theaters.

== Accolades ==
| Year | Award | Category | Recipient | Result | Ref. |
|---|---|---|---|---|---|
| 2020 | Berlin International Film Festival | Tagesspiegel Readers' Award | Window Boy Would Also Like to Have a Submarine | Won | |
| 2020 | Berlin International Film Festival | Best First Feature Film | Window Boy Would Also Like to Have a Submarine | Nominated | |
| 2020 | Jeonju International Film Festival | International competition - Grand Prix | Window Boy Would Also Like to Have a Submarine | Nominated | |
| 2020 | Taipei International Film Festival | International New Talent Competition - Grand Prix | Window Boy Would Also Like to Have a Submarine | Nominated | |
| 2020 | Istanbul International Film Festival | Golden Tulip | Window Boy Would Also Like to Have a Submarine | Nominated | |
| 2020 | Istanbul International Film Festival | International Competition - Special Jury Prize | Window Boy Would Also Like to Have a Submarine | Won | |
| 2020 | Mar del Plata International Film Festival | Latin American Competition | Window Boy Would Also Like to Have a Submarine | Nominated | |
