= A Translator =

2018 Cuban film

- Film poster
- Spanish: Un Traductor
- Directed by: Rodrigo Barriuso; Sebastián Barriuso
- Written by: Lindsay Gossling
- Produced by: Sebastian Barriuso; Lindsay Gossling
- Starring: Rodrigo Santoro; Maricel Alvarez; Yoandra Suarez
- Cinematography: Miguel Ioan Littin-Menz
- Edited by: Michelle Szemberg
- Music by: Bill Laurance
- Production companies: Creative Artisans Media; Involving Pictures
- Distributed by: Film Movement. US
- Release date: 19 January 2018 (Sundance)
- Running time: 108 minutes
- Countries: Cuba; Canada
- Languages: Spanish; Russian

A Translator (Spanish: Un Traductor) is a 2018 Cuban docudrama directed by Rodrigo Barriuso and Sebastián Barriuso. It was selected as Cuba's entry for the Best International Feature Film at the 92nd Academy Awards, but it was not nominated.

== Plot ==
When survivors of the Chernobyl disaster arrive in Cuba for medical treatment, a local Russian literature professor is ordered to act as a translator.

== Cast ==
- Rodrigo Santoro as Malin (the translator)
- Maricel Álvarez as Gladys (nurse)
- Yoandra Suárez as Isona (Malin's wife)
- Nikita Semenov as Alexi
- Jorge Carlos Perez Herrera as Javier
- Genadijs Dolganovs as Vladimir
- Milda Gecaite as Olga
- Eslinda Nuñez as Dr. Rivas
- Osvaldo Doimeadios as Dr. Sanchez
- Nataliya Rodina as Elena

== See also ==
- List of submissions to the 92nd Academy Awards for Best International Feature Film
- List of Cuban submissions for the Academy Award for Best International Feature Film
