= Conversations on Hatred =

- Film poster
- Spanish: Conversaciones sobre el odio
- Directed by: Vera Fogwill; Diego Martínez
- Screenplay by: Vera Fogwill
- Produced by: Vera Fogwill
- Starring: Cecilia Roth; Maricel Álvarez
- Cinematography: Juana Jiménez
- Edited by: Geraldina Rodríguez; Alejandro Carrillo Penovi
- Music by: María Eva Albistur
- Production companies: Cineveritá; Pampa Films; Aramos Cine
- Distributed by: Moon Entertainment
- Release dates: November 2022 (PÖFF); 20 October 2023 (Spain)
- Countries: Spain; Argentina
- Language: Spanish

Conversations on Hatred (Spanish: Conversaciones sobre el odio) is a 2022 Spanish-Argentine experimental psychological thriller film directed by Vera Fogwill and Diego Martínez which stars Cecilia Roth and Maricel Álvarez.

== Plot ==
The plot tracks the face-off between two women, manipulative talent agent Débora and serious and brainy actress Déborah.

== Cast ==
- Cecilia Roth as Débora
- Maricel Álvarez as Déborah
- Joaquín Sabina (voice)

== Production ==
The film is a Cineveritá, Pampa Films, and Aramos Cine Spanish-Argentine co-production. Shooting took place in Madrid and lasted for 5 days.

== Release ==
The film made it to the 'Critics' Picks' slate of the 2022 Tallinn Black Nights Film Festival (PÖFF), where it landed its world premiere. It also screened in the 'Málaga Premiere' section of the 26th Málaga Film Festival in March 2023, and the Buenos Aires International Festival of Independent Cinema (BAFICI) in April 2023. Distributed by Moon Entertainment, it was scheduled to have a limited commercial release in Spain on 20 October 2023.

== Reception ==
Pedro Fernández Mouján of Télam deemed the film to be "tour de force of acting and climaxes" between Roth, (dazzling) "in a superlative work", and [a less histrionic] Marciel Álvarez.

== Accolades ==
Year	Award	Category	Nominee(s)	Result	Ref.
2024	18th Sur Awards	Best Adapted Screenplay	Vera Fogwill	Nominated	

== See also ==
- List of Spanish films of 2023
