= Fuck for Forest (film) =

- Movie poster
- Directed by: Michal Marczak
- Written by: Lukasz Grudzinski; Michal Marczak
- Produced by: Mikolaj Pokromski; Michal Marczak
- Starring: Tommy Hol Ellingsen; Leona Johansson
- Cinematography: Michal Marczak
- Edited by: Dorota Wardeszkiewicz
- Music by: Marcin Masecki
- Production companies: Pokromski Studio, Kinomaton Berlin
- Distributed by: Dogwoof (International), Against Gravity (Poland), Neue Visionen (Germany)
- Release dates: 13 October 2012 (Warsaw Film Festival); 8 March 2013 (South by Southwest Film Festival)
- Countries: Poland; Germany
- Languages: English; German; Spanish; Norwegian

Fuck for Forest is a 2012 documentary film directed by Michal Marczak. The film premiered in Poland on 13 October 2012 at the Warsaw Film Festival, where it won Best Documentary. It premiered in the United States at the South by Southwest Film Festival on 8 March 2013. In 2013 it was nominated for the Sheffield Green Award as part of Sheffield Doc/Fest, and received a Special Mention.

== Plot ==
The documentary follows Fuck for Forest, or FFF, a non-profit environmental organization founded in 2004 in Norway by Leona Johansson and Tommy Hol Ellingsen, which raises money for rescuing the world's rainforests by producing pornographic material or having sex in public.

== Reception ==
=== Critical reception ===
On the review aggregator website Rotten Tomatoes, 63% of 16 critics' reviews are positive, with an average rating of 6.1/10.

=== Controversy ===
In March 2013, Michal Marczak was criticized on the FFF website for manipulating events, such as setting up the "NGO meeting" in Brazil by feeding false information to the FFF team.
