= My Friend from the Park =

2015 film

- Film poster
- Spanish: Mi amiga del parque
- Directed by: Ana Katz
- Written by: Ana Katz
- Screenplay by: Ana Katz; Inés Bortagaray
- Produced by: Diego Lerman; Ana Katz
- Starring: Julieta Zylberberg; Ana Katz; Maricel Álvarez; Mirella Pascual; Mariano Sayavedra; Malena Figó; Daniel Hendler
- Cinematography: Guillermo Nieto
- Edited by: Andrés Tambornino
- Music by: Maximiliano Silveira
- Production companies: Campo Cine; Laura Cine; Mutante Cine; Sudestada Cine
- Release date: 17 September 2015
- Running time: 86 minutes
- Countries: Argentina; Uruguay
- Language: Spanish

My Friend from the Park (Spanish: Mi amiga del parque) is a 2015 Argentine-Uruguayan comedy-drama film directed by Ana Katz. It was shown in the World Cinema Dramatic Competition section at the 2016 Sundance Film Festival where it won the award for screenwriting.

== Cast ==
- Julieta Zylberberg as Liz
- Andrés Milicich as Nicanor
- Mirella Pascual as Yazmina
- Daniel Hendler as Gustavo
- Tomás Newkirk as Pediatra
- Ana Katz as Rosa
- Manuela García Dudiuk as Clarisa
- Maricel Álvarez as Renata

== Reception ==
Ben Kenigsberg of Variety declared the film to be the "sort of film that improves significantly with post-viewing consideration, as one works one's way back through it".
