= The Annual Global Orgasm for Peace =

Awareness day

Global Orgasm was an action originally scheduled for 22 December 2006 by the author and activist couple Donna Sheehan and Paul Reffell to coincide with the end of the winter solstice. The idea was for participants throughout the world to have an orgasm during this one day while thinking about peace. Based on ideas such as that of the noosphere and the work of the Global Consciousness Project at Princeton, it was thought that such an event would have a "widespread positive effect on human well-being."

The "Second Annual Synchronized Global Orgasm for Peace" was scheduled for 6:08 (UTC) on 22 December 2007, the moment of the solstice.

The activity group is registered with the Global Consciousness Project (GCP), a project based at Princeton University, which records the output of numerous, random-number generators placed throughout the globe.

The events in 2006 were inspired by many groups and practices going back thousands of years relating to Tantra and other activities.

Global Orgasm Day has been operational in one form or another since 2000 over 21 and 22 December in private groups, and since 2012 has been more public, and operating in locations around the world until 2019.

== See also ==
- Fuck for Forest, Norwegian activists
