= Sonita (film) =

2015 documentary film

- Directed by: Rokhsareh Ghaemmaghami
- Written by: Rokhsareh Ghaemmaghami
- Starring: Sonita Alizadeh; Latifah Alizadeh
- Edited by: Rune Schweitzer
- Music by: Moritz Denis
- Release date: 2015
- Running time: 90 minutes
- Languages: English; Persian; Dari

Sonita (Dari: سونیتا) is a 2015 documentary film about Sonita Alizadeh, a 15-year-old Afghan rapper and refugee living in Tehran. The film was directed by Rokhsareh Ghaemmaghami and premiered at the 2016 Sundance Film Festival, where it won the festival's World Documentary Grand Jury Prize and Audience Award.

Sonita follows Alizadeh, who fled the Taliban in Herat, Afghanistan as a child and is an undocumented refugee, over a three-year period. During the making of the documentary, Alizadeh's relatives attempt to sell her into marriage. Ghaemmaghami intervened by paying them $2,000 to delay the marriage, and later helping Alizadeh to secure a scholarship in the United States. Ghaemmaghami 's interference in her documentary subject's life was controversial.

== Production ==
Ghaemmaghami met Sonita Alizadeh through a cousin, who introduced the two to each other in the hope that Ghaemmaghami would be able to help Alizadeh meet other musicians.

== Critical reception ==
Writing in Time Out, Tom Huddleston described Sonita as a "warm, uplifting but often challenging film – a compelling human drama packed with searching questions about artistic responsibility and the nature of charity."

In The Guardian, Nigel M Smith gave the film a rating of five stars, commenting, "to witness Sonita’s rise from timid rapper to empowered activist over a three-year span is thrilling."
