= Fuck for Forest =

Non-profit environmental organization

- Established: 2004
- Founder: Tommy Hol Ellingsen, Leona Johansson
- Purpose: Environmentalism
- Location: Berlin, Germany
- Region served: Norway, Latin America, Brazil
- Method: Activism, pornography
- Website: fuckforforest.org

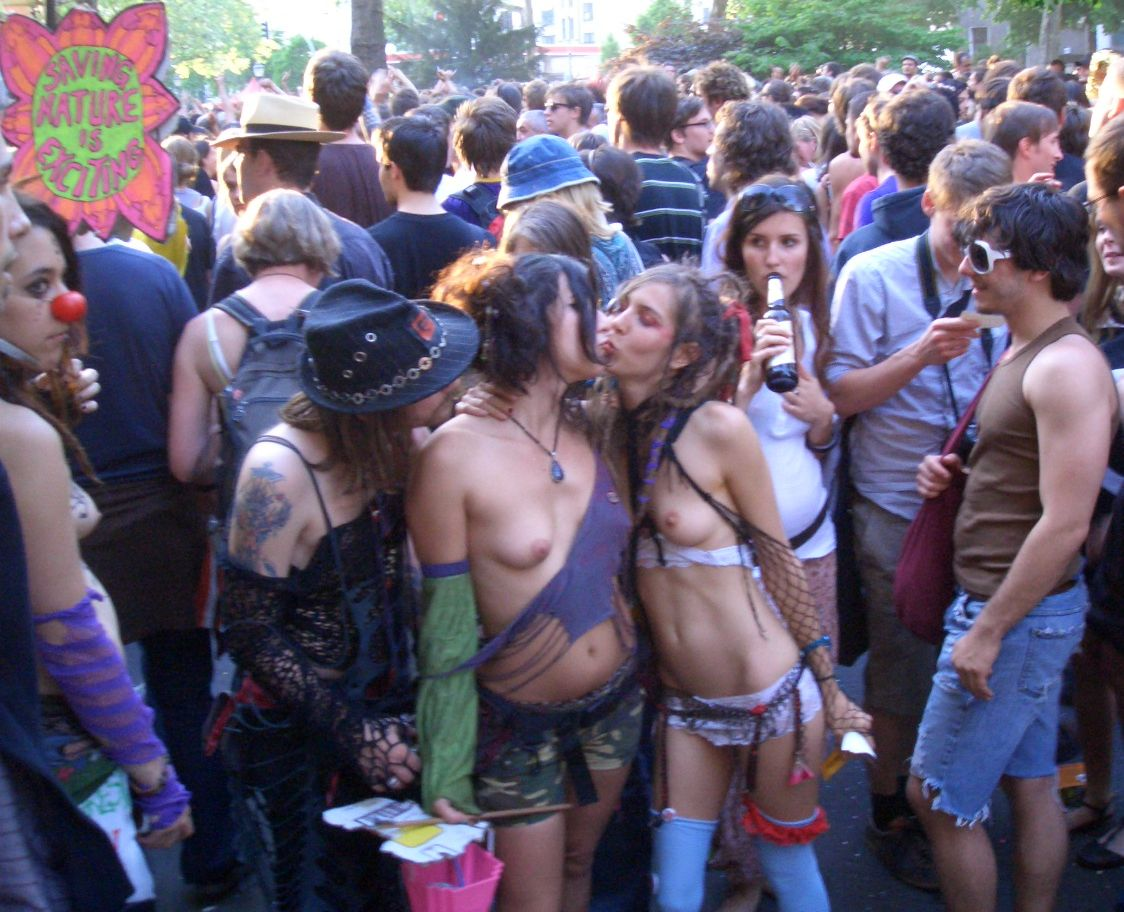
Activists at Karneval der Kulturen (Carnival of Cultures) in Berlin, 2008

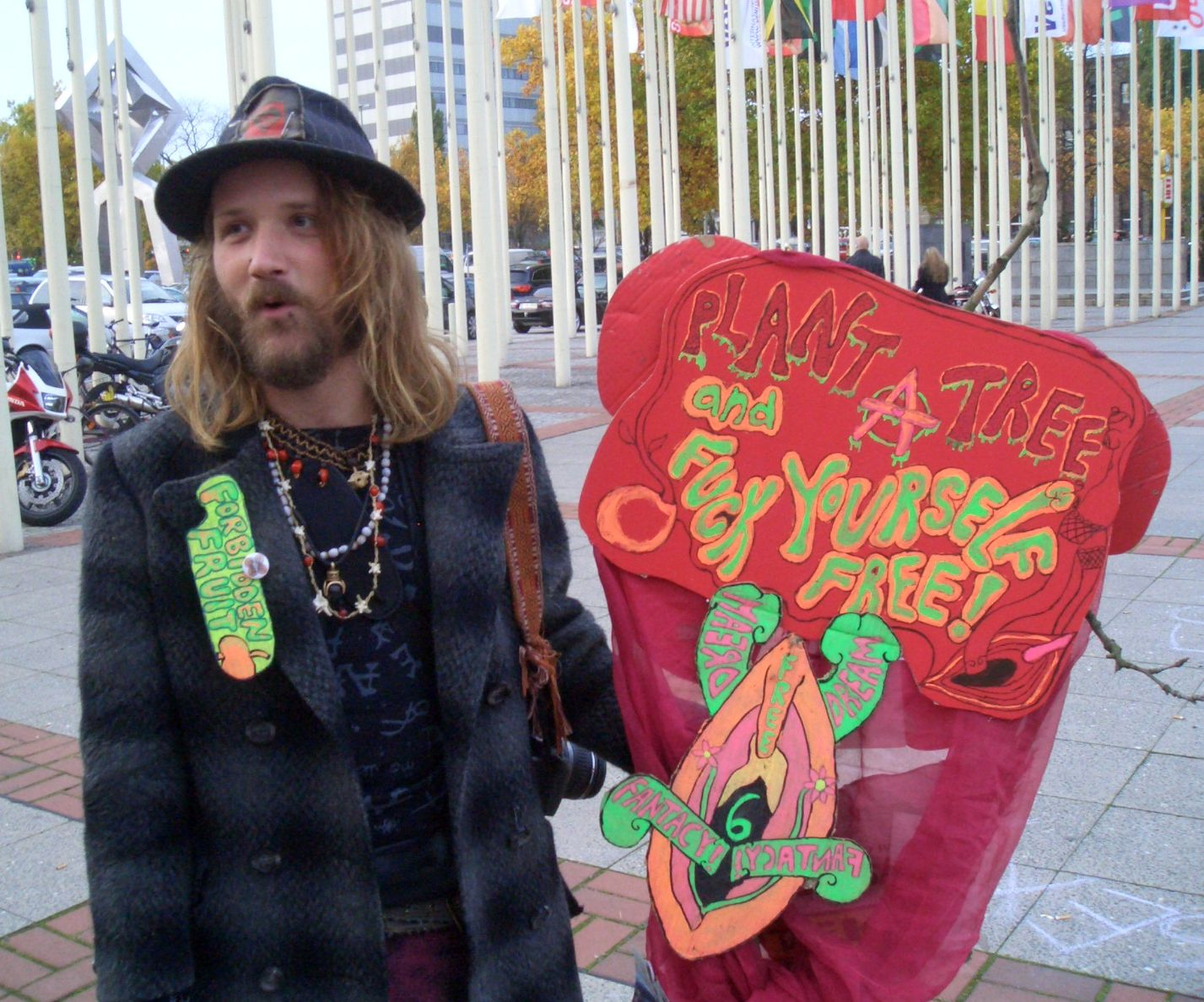
Founder of Fuck for Forest, Tommy Hol Ellingsen

Fuck for Forest (FFF) is a non-profit environmental organisation founded in 2004 in Norway by Leona Johansson and Tommy Hol Ellingsen. It funds itself through a website of sexually explicit videos and photographs, charging a membership fee for access. A portion of funds are donated to the cause of rescuing the world's rainforests. The group moved from Oslo, Norway, to Berlin, Germany, following the trial of its founders for having sex in public.

== History ==
Fuck for Forest co-founders Leona Johansson and Tommy Hol Ellingsen had backgrounds in progressive and green theater and teaching troubled teens. The two started Fuck for Forest to protest the state of the world's rainforests and to make a difference. In its first six months of existence the group received seed funding from the government of Norway for the creation of an alternative environmental group. Ellingsen believes that "eco-porn" is the obvious choice to make a difference. He explained: "Porn makes really, really a lot of money, so why not use that money for good?" In 2004, its first year of existence, the organisation's website netted over $100,000 for rain forest protection through the sale of paid memberships.

== Operations ==
Website subscribers pay $20 per month and the organization says that over 80 percent of the money goes to charities that work to preserve the world's rain forests. The organisation's unorthodox methods have made it difficult to distribute the money it makes. Both the Norwegian chapter of the Rainforest Foundation Fund, and the World Wide Fund for Nature in the Netherlands have refused to accept donations from FFF. As a result, Fuck for Forest is working on a project to work directly with indigenous communities in Costa Rica and the Brazilian Amazon rainforest.

== Public sex controversy ==
The group's founders gained notoriety when they had sex on stage during a 7 July 2004 Quart Festival concert performance featuring Norwegian singer Kristopher Schau and his band The Cumshots. After delivering a brief talk on the impact humans have on forests, Ellingsen asked "How far are you willing to go to save the world?" and the pair began stripping. A banner was raised on stage informing the audience of 5,000 that the couple was having sex to save the rainforest. Commenting on the event, Ellingsen said "I had a bit of a stagefright, but it disappeared as soon as I got going." Johansson added that "I got turned on by all the people."

Ellingsen and Johansson were fined 10,000 Kroner (US$1,470) each for a public sex act, a violation of Norwegian law. Commenting on their arrest, Ellingsen said "It is ridiculous that we are prosecuted and sentenced on a moral basis at the same time as Norway is in the war against Iraq...Violence is aired on TV every day, and if this is so terrible, we could have called this performance art, and we wouldn't have been fined then?" The event promoters were not fined because they claimed they were not aware beforehand.

The two made their court appearance dressed in children's clothes. Ellingsen dropped his trousers and showed his penis during a break in the court proceedings. Ellingsen told Nettavisen that "We would have liked to have fucked here in court as well, it's a nice space, but we would probably be thrown in jail." The group consequently moved its headquarters to Berlin, Germany.

Ellingsen said that within three months of their arrest, the website has attracted more than 1,000 new members, each paying $15 per month.

On 2 June 2011, Fuck for Forest members simulated intercourse in Oslo Cathedral during Mass. The leader of Oslo Bishopry told Norwegian media that the stunt makes him "sad on behalf of those who did it." Two of the individuals performing in the cathedral were ordered by the Oslo District Court to pay fines of 9,000 ($1171.86) and 7,500 ($976.55) kroner for indecent behavior and outraging public decency (seksuelt krenkende og uanstendig atferd), and also to pay 2,000 kroner ($260.41) each for the trial cost.

== Film ==
The 2006 documentary film Fuck was released during the Cannes Film Festival, with the film's poster showing FFF onstage during the Quart Festival incident. The film sought to explore artists who experiment with modes of expression that challenge prevailing social mores.

A feature-length cinema documentary entitled Fuck for Forest was released in 2012. The film, directed by Michał Marczak, is a narrative-driven story that loosely revolves around the group's environmental projects, but focuses on subjects like sexuality, contemporary lifestyles, western morals and cultural variants of human perception.

== See also ==
- Anarchism and issues related to love and sex (Discussion on Fuck For Forest at A-Kongress)
- Ecosia
- Environmental movement
- FEMEN
- Fuck for the heir Puppy Bear!
- Global Orgasm
- Rock for the Rainforest
- Sexecology
- Sex-positive movement
