= The Bad Kids =

- Directed by: Keith Fulton; Lou Pepe
- Produced by: Keith Fulton; Molly O’Brien
- Cinematography: Lou Pepe
- Edited by: Jacob Bricca; Mary Lampson
- Music by: Michael Jacaszek
- Production companies: Low Key Pictures; In association with Filmmaker Fund
- Distributed by: FilmRise
- Release date: January 22, 2016 (Sundance Film Festival)
- Running time: 101 minutes
- Country: United States
- Language: English

The Bad Kids is a 2016 documentary film about students at risk of dropping out who attend an alternative school in Yucca Valley, California.

== Synopsis ==
The film follows three at-risk students during a year at Black Rock Continuation High School. It captures Principal Vonda Viland as she coaches the teens: Lee Bridges, who has a young son with a classmate and is facing the challenge of supporting his family; Jennifer Coffield, who lacks family support for her scholastic efforts; and Joey McGee, who grapples with drug use and instability at home.

== Release ==
The Bad Kids had its world premiere at the 2016 Sundance Film Festival. After its theatrical run, it aired on the PBS series Independent Lens.
