= Florianópolis Dream =

2018 film

- Film poster
- Directed by: Ana Katz
- Written by: Ana Katz
- Starring: Gustavo Garzón
- Distributed by: Cine Tren (Arg.); Vitrine Filmes (Bra.)
- Release dates: 4 July 2018 (Karlovy Vary); 17 January 2019 (Argentina)
- Running time: 106 minutes
- Countries: Argentina; Brazil
- Languages: Spanish; Portuguese

Florianópolis Dream (Spanish: Sueño Florianópolis) is a 2018 Argentine comedy film directed by Ana Katz. It was screened in the Contemporary World Cinema section at the 2018 Toronto International Film Festival.

== Cast ==
- Gustavo Garzón as Pedro
- Mercedes Morán as Lucrecia
- Andréa Beltrão as Larisa
- Marco Ricca as Marco
