= Jacqueline Argentine =

2016 comedy-drama film

Jacqueline Argentine, sometimes stylized as Jacqueline (Argentine), is a 2016 comedy-drama film directed by Bernardo Britto, supported by the Sundance Institute's Feature Film Program. It premiered at the 2016 Sundance Film Festival. The film concerns an unnamed filmmaker (Wyatt Cenac), who receives a sensitive tip from a French spy in hiding (Camille Rutherford).
