= Hans Roosipuu =

Estonian film director and cinematographer

Hans Roosipuu (2 April 1931 Torma Parish, Tartu County – 8 July 2017) was an Estonian sport film director and cinematographer.

1961 he graduated from Gerasimov Institute of Cinematography. 1953-1957 he was a photographer at the newspaper Edasi. 1959-1991 he was cinematographer and director at Tallinnfilm.

== Filmography ==
- Ülekanne 56 : 13 (1969)
- Kümnevõistlejad (1971)
- Pentathlon moderne (1974, co-author)
- Korvpallikohtuniku metoodika (1976)
- Optimistid (1976, co-author)
- 100 m selili kammerorkestri saatel (1978)
- Tennis (educational film, 1978)
- Heerosed (olympic winners Aavo Pikkuus, Ivar Stukolkin, Jaak Uudmäe and Viljar Loor; 1980)
- Oo, sport, sa oled rahu (1981)
- Küljetuul (1983)
- Liikumine ja lapsed (1985)
- Imetegija võlg (Riho Suun; 1987, co-author)
- Eesti partii (Paul Keres; 1991)
- Imet püüdmas (family Šmigun; 1996, co-author)
- Tempo di valse (Indrek Pertelson; 1999)
- Tiim (Mati Alaver and his team; 2006, co-author)
