= Rokhsareh Ghaemmaghami =

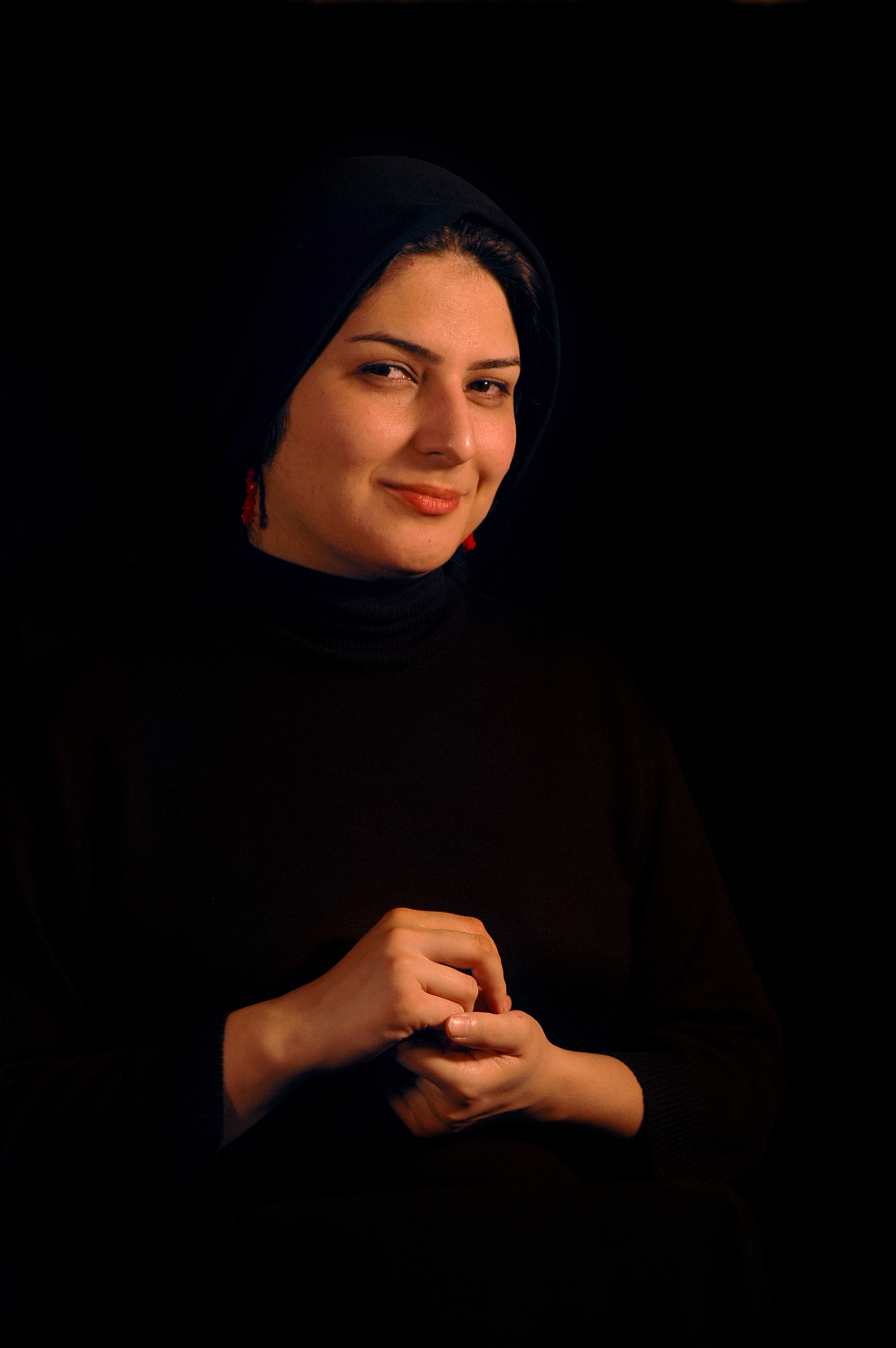
- Occupation: Filmmaker
- Notable work: Sonita (film)

Rokhsareh Ghaemmaghami is a Sundance Award-winning Iranian documentary filmmaker who was born in Tehran. She has directed one full-length documentary, four short documentaries and one animated documentary.

Ghaemmaghami's most recent film, Sonita (2015), tells the story of Sonita Alizadeh, a teenage Afghan refugee in Iran who uses rap music as a way to escape the traditionally limiting roles of women in Afghanistan after her family tries to sell her into marriage. when Sonita's mother decides to sell Sonita to a marriage, Rokhsareh cannot keep her objective role as a documentary filmmaker and pays $2,000 to Sonita's mother and helps Sonita to record a music video and escape her situation. Interference of filmmaker in protagonist circumstances made this documentary controversial.

The film won the World Documentary Audience Award and Grand Jury Prize at the Sundance Film Festival in January 2016, and it also won the Audience Award for Best Documentary at IDFA. The film received the True Life Fund at the 2016 True/False Film Festival in Columbia, Mo. The fund sponsors the subject of one film each year, and it offers the viewers a chance to make a monetary donation to help the film's subject. The fund collected $42,500 for Sonita, which is the most the True Life Fund had ever raised.

Ghaemmaghami currently lives in the United States, but has traveled to show Sonita at film festivals across the world.

== Life and career ==
Ghaemmaghami is from Tehran and received her Bachelor of Arts in filmmaking and Master of Arts in animation from Tehran Art University. She researched documentary animation and published Animated Documentary, a New Way to Express as her Master's research.

She directed a short, animated documentary during her research in 2007 called Cyanosis, which showed the work of a Tehran street artist.

Ghaemmaghami's documentary Going Up the Stairs tells the story of an illiterate Iranian woman who discovers her painting talent late in life. S Akram was married at the age of nine, and she finds an outlet much later in her life through painting. Her work is discovered and an exhibition of her art is going to be shown in Paris. However, she needs her husband's permission to go to the showing. Ghaemmaghami uses the documentary to show traditional Iranian marriages and the struggle women face in these marriages.

Many of Ghaemmaghami's films tell the stories of artists overcoming barriers to their success.

== Sonita ==
Ghaemmaghami's first full-length documentary, Sonita, shows how, as both director and character in the film, Ghaemmaghami struggled between a desire to help Sonita or continue filming as the story unfolded.

“I wanted to just let the story happen but at some point the situation became such that I had to help," Ghaemmaghami told The National.

Regarding Ghaemmaghami's role in the film, The Guardian says, “The approach works: to witness Sonita's rise from timid rapper to empowered activist over a three-year span is thrilling.”

One of the most-discussed elements of the documentary, and what Ghaemmaghami herself calls the biggest challenge of making the documentary, is when she inserts herself into the documentary and gives Sonita's family $2,000 — a sum that will help her buy time before she is sold into marriage.

“Making "Sonita" was a journey into the depths of society to understand poverty, immigration, war, identity, sexism, tradition and human values versus filmmaking conventions,” Ghaemmaghami told Women and Hollywood.

Ghaemmaghami's involvement in the film has also been attributed to Sonita's growth as a woman. The Hollywood Reporter says: “Ghaem Maghami's camera is never any kind of fly on the wall, and the voluble Sonita's chattily informal relationship with the older director … is clearly a crucial element in her personal development into the super-confident, irrepressible young woman she becomes.”

== Style ==
Ghaemmaghami describes the main theme of her documentaries as “outsider art.” When the audience leaves the theater, Ghaemmaghami told Women and Hollywood, “I want them to think about small changes they can make happen.”

== Filmography ==
- Sonita (2015)
- Going Up the Stairs (2011)
- A Loud Solitude (2010)
- Born 20 Minutes Late (2010)
- Cyanosis (2007)
- Pigeon Fanciers (2000)

== Awards and nominations ==
=== Sonita ===
- Winner, Audience Prize (Amsterdam International Documentary Film Festival)
- Winner, DOC U! Award (Amsterdam International Documentary Film Festival)
- Winner, Grand Jury Prize (Sundance Film Festival)
- Winner, Audience Award (Sundance Film Festival)
- Nomination, Independent spirit award
- Winner, Center for Documentary Studies Filmmaker Award (Full Frame Documentary Film Festival)
- Winner, Audience Award (Portland International Film Festival)
- Winner, Audience Award (Sarasota Film Festival)

=== Going Up the Stairs ===
- Winner, Best Female-Directed Film (Sheffield International Documentary Festival)
- Nomination, Special Jury Award (Sheffield International Documentary Festival)
- Nomination, Silver Wolf (Amsterdam International Documentary Film Festival)

=== Cyanosis ===
Cyanosis, Documentary with animation, 32 Min., Iran, 2007

- Best student Documentary in Sheffield doc/ fest, UK, 2008
- Silver Nanook for the Best short documentary, Flahertiana documentary festival- 2008
- Best documentary award from Tehran 12th International & 24th National Short Film Festival, 2007
- Best short Documentary, Play Doc, Spain, 2009
- Golden Panda for the most innovative student documentary, China, 2010
- Honor Diploma in New Generation, Doc Leipzig festival, Germany, 2008
- Honor Diploma from 26th International Fajr Film Festival, 2008
- Diploma of Merit of Jury and the Audiences Award in lab10 competition of The 38th edition of Tampere International Short Film Festival, Finland, 2008
- Winner of diploma of Merit in 48th Krakow short film festival, 2008
- Diploma of honor Documentary competition, Fikke film festival, Portugal, 2008
