= Wyatt Cenac =

American actor and comedian (born 1976)

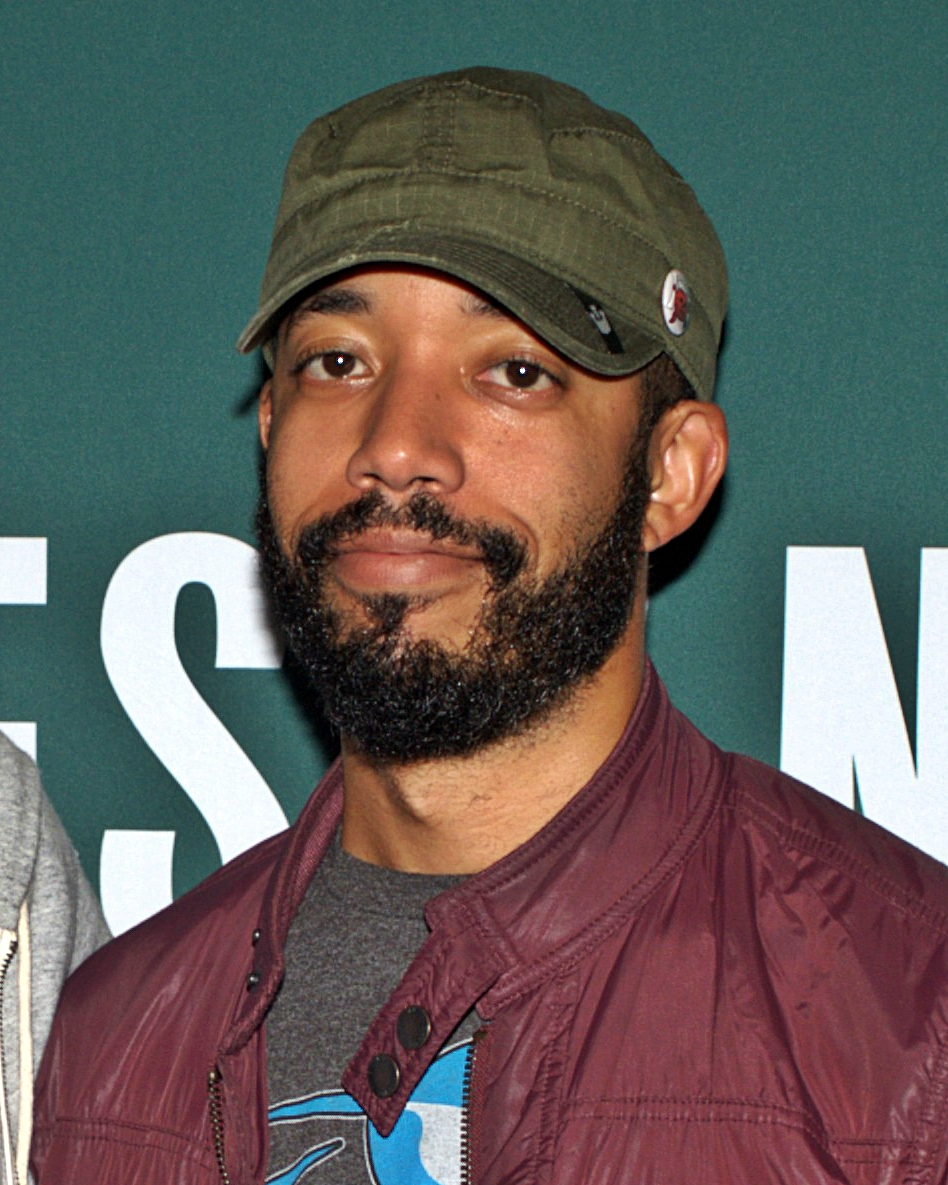
- Cenac in 2010 at Earth book launch
- Born: Wyatt John Foster Cenac Jr. April 19, 1976 (age 50); New York City, New York, U.S.
- Education: University of North Carolina at Chapel Hill
- Occupations: Actor; comedian; writer; producer
- Years active: 1995–present
- Website: www.wyattcenac.com

Wyatt John Foster Cenac Jr. (/ˈwaɪ.ət sɪˈnæk/ WY-ət sin-AK; born April 19, 1976) is an American comedian, actor, producer, and writer. He was a correspondent and writer for The Daily Show from 2008 to 2012. He starred in the TBS series People of Earth and in Barry Jenkins's first feature Medicine for Melancholy. He also hosted and produced the HBO series Wyatt Cenac's Problem Areas.

== Early life ==
Cenac was born in New York on April 19, 1976, at St. Vincent's Hospital in Manhattan and spent his early years in the Bronx. His father, Wyatt Cenac Sr., was a cab driver born in Saint Mark Parish, Grenada, in 1944. When Cenac was five, his father was shot and killed in his cab by a teenage passenger in Harlem. Cenac moved with his mother (Patricia Hampton), a New York native, and Trinidadian stepfather to Dallas, Texas, in 1981. He spent his summers with his maternal grandmother in Crown Heights, Brooklyn in an apartment on President Street.

While in elementary school, he became friends with comic book writer Brian K. Vaughan, who also introduced him to comic books. He graduated from the Jesuit College Preparatory School of Dallas and the University of North Carolina at Chapel Hill before moving to Los Angeles. As of October 2014, Cenac lives in Fort Greene, Brooklyn, and previously lived in Prospect Heights during Hurricane Sandy in 2012.

Cenac is the nephew of the Hon. Mr. Justice Dunbar Cenac, Registry of the Eastern Caribbean Supreme Court. His father was the cousin of former deputy prime minister of Grenada Bernard Coard, who was imprisoned for 25 years following the American invasion of Grenada in October 1983. Cenac's paternal thrice-great-grandfather Cherebin Cenac was an officer from Agen, France, on a French battleship during the Napoleonic Wars who settled in Soufrière, Saint Lucia. Cherebin's youngest child, Francis (1830–1892), later emigrated to Grenada.

== Career ==
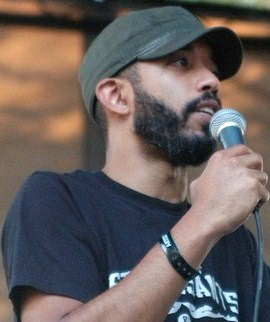
Cenac at Pitchfork Music Festival 2010

Having previously worked for three years as a writer on King of the Hill, Cenac garnered public attention in The Doomed Planet comedy sketch in which he did an impression of then-senator Barack Obama, discussing possible campaign posters.

In June 2008, Cenac was hired as a correspondent and writer on The Daily Show with Jon Stewart. After making several comedic appearances along with other correspondents, Cenac filed his first field report on July 21, 2008; titled "Baruch Obama," the report discussed Jewish voters' opinions of Democratic Presidential nominee Barack Obama. He continued to integrate satirical Black-oriented material in his Daily Show segments, including "Rapper or Republican" until his final Daily Show appearance on December 13, 2012. In a July 2015 appearance on WTF with Marc Maron, Cenac said that his departure from The Daily Show had stemmed in part from a heated argument he had with Jon Stewart over a June 2011 Daily Show bit about Republican Presidential candidate Herman Cain. Despite this, he appeared on Stewart's final episode of Daily Show.

In October 2009, he worked with rapper Slim Thug on the music video "Still a Boss", a parody of how the recession is affecting the rap community. Cenac costarred in Medicine for Melancholy, an independent drama by Barry Jenkins released in 2008 that includes issues of African American identity and gentrification in San Francisco. Cenac's other film roles include supporting parts in Sleepwalk with Me and Hits, as well as a lead role in 2016's Jacqueline Argentine and 2017's festival hit, Fits and Starts.

Cenac played the voice of Lenny and Michael Johnson in the Nickelodeon animated series Fanboy & Chum Chum. Cenac guest-starred on the MC Frontalot album Solved. Cenac's first hour-long comedy special, Comedy Person, premiered May 14, 2011, on Comedy Central.

In October 2014, Netflix released Cenac's second comedy special, Wyatt Cenac: Brooklyn. This album was nominated at the 58th Annual Grammy Awards for Best Comedy Album. In 2014, he guest-starred in an episode of the Netflix series BoJack Horseman. The following year, he appeared in a filmed segment with fellow comedians Rachel Feinstein and Alex Karpovsky on Last Week Tonight with John Oliver. Cenac co-hosted four episodes of The Bugle podcast with Andy Zaltzman in 2016; Zaltzman previously hosted alongside Oliver.

Cenac released his third stand up album Furry Dumb Fighter in 2016 both digitally and on vinyl. It was recorded in Madison, WI. Cenac reports that the album title is meant to sound like "freedom fighter." The same year he starred in TBS sitcom People of Earth. Cenac played the lead role of Ozzie Graham, a journalist writing about a support group for self-professed alien abductees. The show was cancelled after two seasons. In 2017 Cenac released a web-series titled aka Wyatt Cenac about his life as a crime-fighting vigilante in a gentrifying Brooklyn. Cenac's HBO docuseries, Wyatt Cenac's Problem Areas, premiered in April 2018. A second season began broadcasting on April 5, 2019. On June 7 of that year, the series was cancelled.

In August 2021, he signed a deal with Cartoon Network Studios and Warner Bros. Animation.

== Filmography ==
=== Film ===
Year	Title	Role	Notes
2006	Grounds Zero	Bad Tipper	Short film
2006	The Great Sketch Experiment	Prisoner	Sketch: "So You Want to Be a Cop"
2008	Medicine for Melancholy	Micah	
2008	Dating Catwoman	Catwoman's Boyfriend	Short film
2012	Sleepwalk with Me	Chris	
2014	Hits	Babatunde	
2014	Growing Up and Other Lies	Gunderson	
2016	Jacqueline Argentine	Director	
2017	Fits and Starts	David	
2017	I Do... Until I Don't	Zander	
2020	It Started As a Joke	self	Documentary

=== Television ===
Year	Title	Role	Notes
2004–2008	King of the Hill	Guard/Cameraman/Dr. Stephens/Football Announcer/Tough-Looking Guy	Wrote two episodes
2007	Yacht Rock	James Ingram	Episode: "Footloose"
2008–2012	The Daily Show	Himself/Various	Wrote 570 episodes
2009–2014	Fanboy & Chum Chum	Lenny/Various	24 episodes
2010	Rally to Restore Sanity and/or Fear		TV special; writer
2011	Wyatt Cenac: Comedy Person	Himself	Stand-up special; also writer, executive producer
2013	The Venture Bros.	Tommy/Mr. Blunder	Episode: "What Color Is Your Cleansuit?"
2013	The Eric Andre Show	Black Scientologist	Episode: "Chance the Rapper, Mel B. "
2014	TripTank	Bin Laden/Dick	
2014	Maron	Himself	Episode: "Boomer Lives"
2014	Wyatt Cenac: Brooklyn	Himself	Stand-up special; also writer, director, executive producer
2014	BoJack Horseman	Wayne (voice)	2 episodes
2015	Inside Amy Schumer	Guy Friend No. 1	Episode: "I'm Sorry"
2016–2017	People of Earth	Ozzie Graham	20 episodes
2016	Night Train with Wyatt Cenac	Himself	6 episodes
2017	Archer	Cliff	2 episodes
2017	Bob's Burgers	Cool Nick	1 episode
2017	aka Wyatt Cenac	Himself	10 episodes web series
2018–2019	Wyatt Cenac's Problem Areas	Himself	20 episodes
2021	The Great North	Colton the Croonin' Cod / Deppy / Dr. Gary / Harry Hotfog	4 episodes
