= Pieter-Jan De Pue =

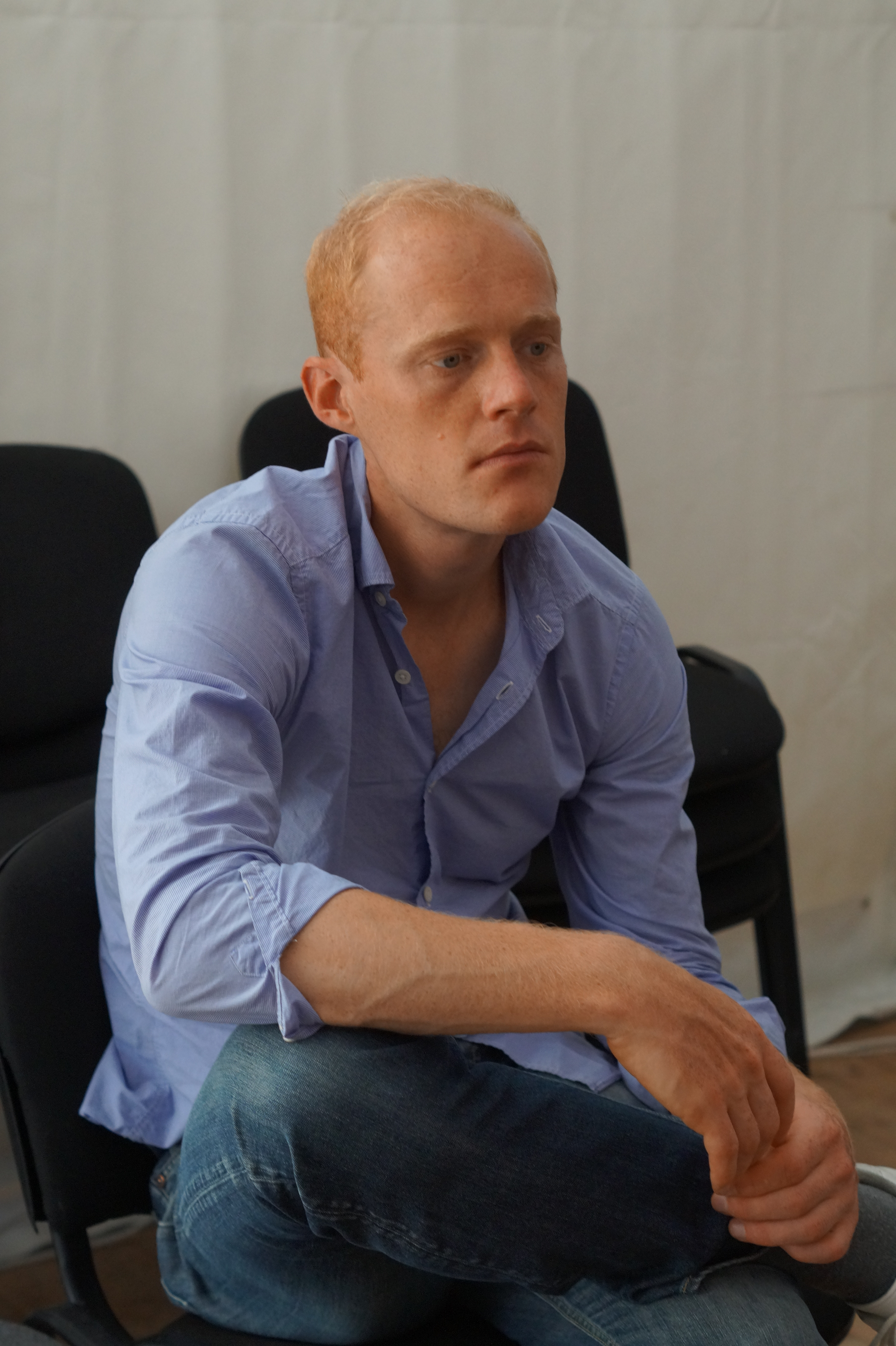
- Pieter-Jan De Pue at the Odesa International Film Festival, 2016
- Born: 1982 (age 43–44); Ghent
- Occupation: film director

Pieter-Jan de Pue (1982, Ghent) is a photographer and film director from Belgium. He studied at the visual arts school RITS. His first film documentary is "The Land of the Enlightened" which won a World Cinema Documentary Special Jury Award for Best Cinematography at the Sundance Film Festival in 2016. While shooting the film he was attacked by the Taliban.

== Filmography ==
- O (2006)
- The Land of the Enlightened (2016)
- Girls and Honey (2017)
