= Ana Katz =

Argentine writer, director and actress (born 1975)

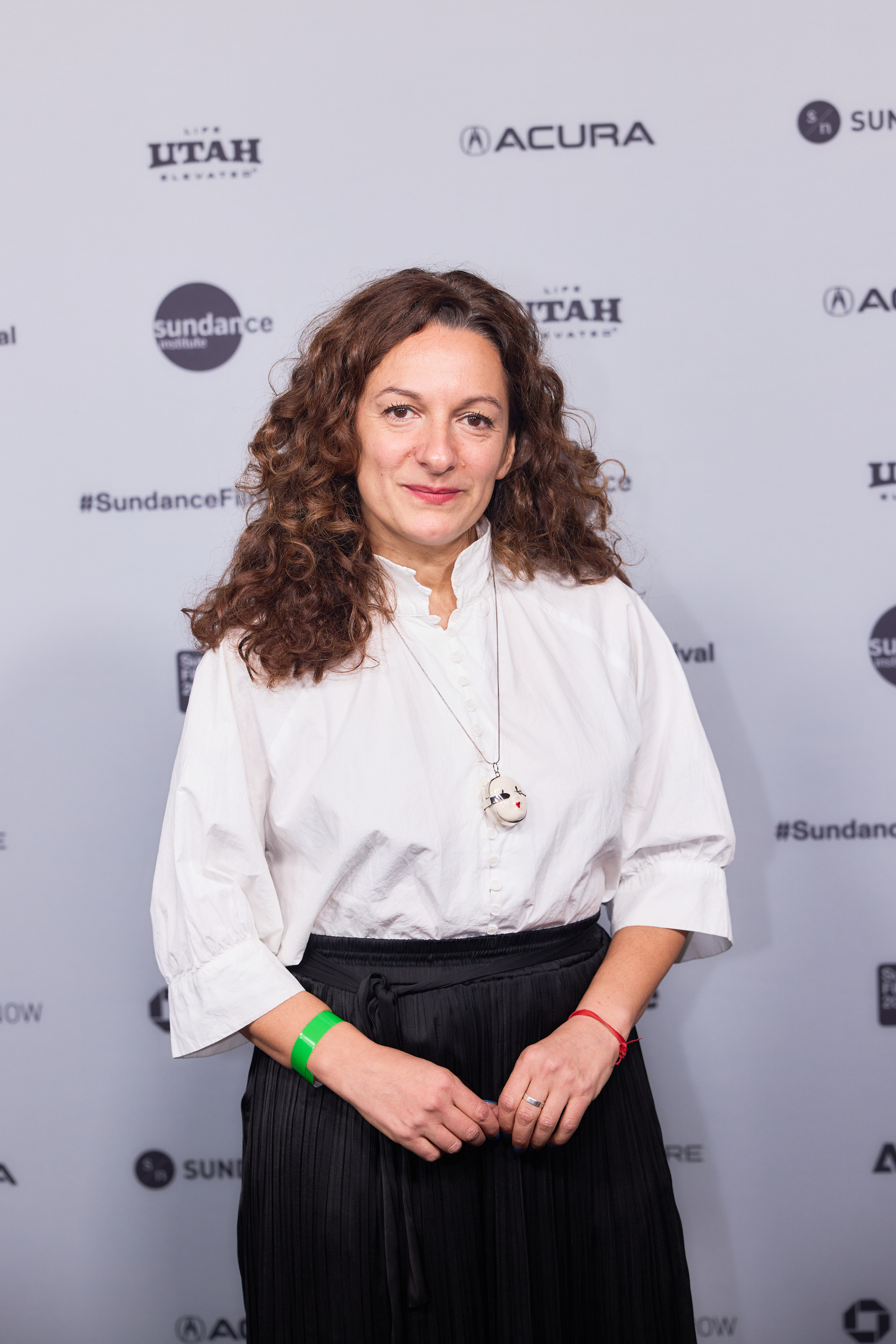
- Born: Ana Katz; November 2, 1975 (age 51); Buenos Aires, Argentina
- Occupations: Film director, screenwriter and film producer
- Years active: 1995–present
- Spouse: Daniel Hendler (separated)
- Children: 2

Ana Katz (born November 2, 1975) is an Argentine writer, director, and actress. Her writing and directing credits include My Friend from the Park, Los Marziano, Musical Chairs, A Stray Girlfriend and Florianópolis Dream. Her acting-only credits include The Candidate, Loco por vos, Kiki, Love to Love, and The Dog Who Wouldn't Be Quiet.

== Early life ==
Katz was born in Buenos Aires to a Catholic mother and Jewish father.

== Personal life ==
Katz was married to Daniel Hendler, a Jewish actor and director from Uruguay. They had two children together and separated in 2018.
