= Plan C =

Non-profit medication abortion information provider

- Formation: 2015
- Founders: Francine Coeytaux; Elisa Wells; Amy Merrill
- Type: non-profit organization
- Website: www.plancpills.org

Plan C is a nonprofit and public-health campaign (fiscally sponsored by Possibility Labs, a 501(c)(3)) that provides information and educational resources on how to access abortion pills by mail in the United States. It was founded in 2015 by Francine Coeytaux, Elisa Wells, and Amy Merrill to advocate for the destigmatization of self-managed abortion with pills and to connect individuals across the US with abortion pill providers.

== Objectives and activities ==
Plan C conducts research and publicly shares information about how people are accessing mifepristone and misoprostol abortion pills in the US. Their stated goal is to transform access to abortion in the United States by normalizing the self-directed option of abortion pills by mail and placing the ability to end an early pregnancy directly in the hands of anyone who seeks it.

The campaign pursues four main goals:

1. Research and share information regarding how people are accessing abortion pills in the United States, including domestic and global evidence about the safety and efficacy of medication abortion.
2. Work with reproductive health organizations and technology innovators to connect individuals to telehealth providers or services facilitating medication abortion.
3. Advocate for destigmatization of self-managed abortion and over-the-counter access to abortion pills.
4. Disrupt unjust barriers to medical abortion access and put agency back in the hands of individuals by bringing public attention to the transformative nature of abortion pills.

=== The Plan C Guide ===
The Plan C Guide provides detailed, state-specific information about accessing abortion pills by mail without a prescription in the United States. Each state guide is organized to help individuals understand their options clearly and safely, covering:

- US-Based Telehealth Clinics That Mail Pills: Information on clinics based in the United States that provide abortion pills through telehealth or mail services.
- International Online Clinics: Listings of trusted international providers that ship abortion pills to the U.S.
- Websites That Sell Pills: Websites that offer abortion pills by mail without a prescription, often marketing themselves as online pharmacies, including pricing and shipping details.
- Community Networks That Mail Pills: Peer-to-peer and community-based networks that assist with obtaining and mailing abortion pills.
- In-Person Clinics: Information about local clinics that provide abortion care services, including medication abortion where available.
- Legal and Safety Guidance: General information on potential legal risks and privacy considerations related to ordering and using abortion pills.
- Support and Resources: Contact information for live phone and text support hotlines, such as the M+A Hotline and Aya Contigo, offering confidential assistance.

The guides are updated regularly to reflect available providers and support services. This ensures individuals can make informed decisions based on the most current information available.

== History ==
=== 1990's ===
In the 1990s, founders Elisa Wells and Francine Coeytaux worked to get Plan B, or the morning after pill, approved by the FDA for over-the-counter sale.

=== 2016 ===
The Plan C website launched in 2016 to provide accessible information about online abortion pill providers and the self-managed abortion process. The campaign began researching websites calling themselves online pharmacies and claiming to sell abortion pills, tested the pills received by mail from those websites, and published their findings as the Plan C Report Card.

=== 2018 ===
In 2018, Plan C played a significant role in the launch of the CHAT study (California Home Abortion by Telehealth) in which researchers at the University of California, San Francisco conducted a study to gain a deeper understanding of the experiences of individuals who utilize virtual clinics that serve patients throughout the United States. This study was a crucial step towards not only normalizing telehealth services and online access to pills but also in documenting and researching their effectiveness and safety, and validating them as a viable option for individuals seeking reproductive healthcare.

=== 2019 ===
Plan C's website received over 50,000 visitors per month in 2019 from individuals across all 50 states in search of information on abortion pill access by mail and reproductive rights.

=== 2020 ===
In April 2020, at the onset of the COVID-19 pandemic, the medical community expedited the adoption of "no-test" protocols, which facilitated online abortion care, telehealth start-ups, and more clinics serving patients online. As certain states deemed abortions nonessential medicine, and the majority of the country was subjected to "safer at home" orders restricting access to basic medical care, the U.S. Food and Drug Administration (FDA) temporarily lifted restrictions on shipping mifepristone. During this time, Plan C issued a "call to providers" to inform the medical community of the growing need and the opportunity to serve patients by offering telehealth abortion services. Several providers launched startups, including Abortion on Demand, Choix, Hey Jane, among others.

=== 2022 ===
Following Dobbs v. Jackson in 2022, Plan C expanded their online resource directory to include organizations that offer the advance provision of abortion pills, a service that creates the option to order abortion pills in advance so they will be available if they are needed at some point in the future. The Plan C website lists organizations that offer the advance provision service including Aid Access, carafem, Women on Web, and The Massachusetts Medication Abortion Access Project.

=== 2023 ===
With the Dobbs decision and the overturning of Roe v. Wade, Plan C responded by increasing the information they make available regarding alternate ways to access abortion pills and resources to help people safely self-manage their own abortions at home.

=== 2024 ===
Due to increased competition among providers to appear in the first few results of Plan C' Guide, the costs for abortion pills by mail without clinician consultation decreased to $25-28 in 2024. While the cost for abortion pills by mail including a telehealth consultation with a US-based clinician averaged $150, the lowest cost telehealth provider had begun offering their service in all 50 states for a minimum payment of $5.

== Documentary and media ==
The Plan C organization was the subject of a documentary film of the same name, Plan C, directed by Tracy Droz Tragos. It premiered at the 2023 Sundance Film Festival. The film focuses on Plan C's ongoing grassroots efforts to expand access to abortion across the United States via the distribution of at-home abortion pills ordered from the internet and delivered through the mail. The film won a Webby Award in 2024 for creatively using social media for advocacy.
