= Abortion in Jordan =

Abortion law and current climate in Jordan

Abortion is illegal in most circumstances in Jordan, where it is criminalised under articles 321-325 of the Jordanian Penal Code. The law, which is derived from colonial French and Ottoman laws, criminalises both the individual seeking an abortion and any individual or healthcare professional who assists them in a termination. The law does allow for abortion to save the life or preserve the health of the individual, and in 1971 a public health law was introduced to also allow abortion for mental health reasons.

For those who perform an abortion on themselves, the penalty ranges from six months to three years in prison. The penalty for performing an abortion on somebody else can range from a year to three years in prison; the penalty may be reduced if the abortion is performed by a descendant, or relative up to the third degree in order to 'save her honour'. If the individual seeking an abortion dies, the person performing the abortion is sentenced to temporary hard labour for at least five years, and somebody who performs an abortion on a woman without her consent is sentenced to hard labour for up to ten years.

In 2008, a public health law was introduced to prohibit doctors from providing advice on abortion except when to prevent a threat to the life or health of the pregnant woman. In 2021, a study on medical students at the Jordan University of Science and Technology found that they overwhelmingly held a conservative view towards abortion, with over three-quarters (76.8%) indicating they believed every conceived child had a right to be born.

The Regional Observatory on Violence Against Women and Girls in the Middle East notes that Jordan's public health law criminalises abortion despite its other laws which guarantee the right to sexual and reproductive health. Some women are evading the country's strict abortion laws by using online services; Middle East Eye has reported women using abortion pill providers like Women On Web. Increased rates of unsafe self-induced abortion have also been reported among Syrians in Jordanian refugee camps.

== Calls for reform ==
In 2017, the Jordanian office of the women's rights organisation Sisterhood is Global Institute (SIGI) called for the government to change the abortion law and allow for terminations in the case pregnancy from rape or incest. The organisation reported that 49 women in Jordan had been jailed for abortion between 2009 and 2016, according to Ministry of Justice figures.

A number of fatwas have also been made on the topic of abortion since 1993 that appear to challenge some of the public health laws, including a 2014 edict from the Jordanian Council for Jurisprudence which requested that each case of an abortion requested as a result of rape or incest should be assessed individually.
