= Plan C (film) =

2023 American documentary film

- Promotional release poster
- Directed by: Tracy Droz Tragos
- Produced by: Tracy Droz Tragos
- Cinematography: Derek Howard; Emily Topper
- Edited by: Meredith Raithel Perry
- Music by: Nathan Halpern
- Production companies: Dinky Pictures; Lismore Road Productions; XTR; Chicken & Egg Pictures
- Release dates: January 23, 2023 (Sundance); October 6, 2023 (United States)
- Running time: 99 minutes
- Country: United States
- Language: English

Plan C is a 2023 American documentary film produced and directed by Tracy Droz Tragos. The film centers around ongoing grassroots efforts to provide access to abortion across the United States through the distribution of abortion pills in the wake of Dobbs v. Jackson Women's Health Organization, a landmark U.S. Supreme Court decision that overturned Roe v. Wade.

Plan C premiered at the Sundance Film Festival on January 23, 2023, and was released on October 6, 2023.

== Synopsis ==
Plan C focuses on efforts by the grassroots organization of the same name to expand access to abortion across the United States via the distribution of at-home abortion pills through mail and the internet.

== Production ==
Prior to Plan C, producer-director Tracy Droz Tragos directed Abortion: Stories Women Tell, a 2016 documentary film with similar subject matter. Some time after Brett Kavanaugh was appointed as an associate justice of the U.S. Supreme Court in 2018, a decision which Tragos felt heralded the eventual overturning of Roe v. Wade, Tragos met Francine Coeytaux, co-founder of the Plan C organization, in Los Angeles, California. During the COVID-19 pandemic in 2020, amidst recommendations and orders to refrain from visiting hospitals and healthcare centers except when in need of essential services (which, Tragos noted, in states like Texas, did not include abortion procedures, which were deemed non-essential), Coeytaux and others decided, "We're going to put out this call to arms and see if folks in the United States will finally step forward and mail pills to their patients."

Plan C was produced over the course of four years. Regarding the film's interviewees, Tragos stated, "Because I had made a previous film about abortion access, there was a bit of a trust built in. So, I'm glad to say it wasn't as hard as if I was coming at it from scratch. Francine made a lot of introductions. There's a lot of trust-building, and that has to happen."

== Reception ==
On the review aggregator website Rotten Tomatoes, 96% of 23 critics' reviews are positive, with an average rating of 7.8/10. The website's consensus reads: "An urgently timely documentary, Plan C is further distinguished by its clear-eyed approach to an emotional and deeply personal subject."
