= 2014 Champs-Élysées Film Festival =

- Official poster of the 3rd Champs-Élysées Film Festival
- Closing film: Gett: The Trial of Viviane Amsalem
- Location: Paris, France
- Founded: 2012
- Awards: Audience Prize: Best American Independent Feature-Length Film (Fort Bliss)
- Hosted by: Jacqueline Bisset & Bertrand Tavernier
- No. of films: 9 (Feature-Length Films In Competition); 21 (French Short Films In Competition); 12 (American Short Films In Competition)
- Festival date: 11 – 17 June 2014
- Website: champselyseesfilmfestival.com

The third edition of the Champs-Élysées Film Festival was held from 11 to 17 June 2014, with actors Jacqueline Bisset and Bertrand Tavernier as Honorary Presidents and Keanu Reeves, Agnès Varda, Whit Stillman and Mike Figgis as guests of honor. More than 120,000 people attended the festival, with more than 110 films screened. Ronit Elkabetz and Shlomi Elkabetz's Gett: The Trial of Viviane Amsalem was shown at the closing ceremony. Along with its competitive Official Selections for American feature-length films, American Shorts and French Shorts, the festival presented a wide selection of important American and French movie premieres, the TCM Cinema Essentials, a thirteen-film selection of American classics, and the Great French Classics, a five-film selection. Both honorary presidents held masterclasses, and the guests of honor presented each a selection of their respective filmographies. Three Audience Prizes (Best American Feature-Length Film, Best American Short Film, Best French Short Film), a Bloggers Jury Award (Best American Feature-Length Film) and a Youth Jury Award (Favorite Film in the TCM Cinema Essentials Selection) were presented during the closing ceremony, held at the Publicis Cinema. Along with the US in Progress program, a new event targeted at industry professionals was held alongside the festival: titled Paris Coproduction Village it brought together 12 international feature film projects in development looking for French and European partners, as well as 6 projects from the Cannes Film Festival Cinefondation Residence.

== Official Selection ==
=== American Independent Feature-Length Films ===
- 1982, directed by Tommy Oliver
- American Promise, directed by Michèle Stephenson & Joe Brewster
- Fort Bliss, directed by Claudia Myers
- Obvious Child, directed by Gillian Robespierre
- Rich Hill, directed by Tracy Droz Tragos & Andrew Droz Palermo
- See You Next Tuesday, directed by Drew Tobia
- Summer Of Blood, directed by Onur Tukel
- Sun Belt Express directed by Evan Buxbaum

=== Short films ===
The Official Selection of Short Films comprises more than 30 films, which were selected by a French industry team as well as four major film school programs: University of Southern California’s School of Cinematic Arts, AFI and Columbia University’s Columbia University Film Festival for the United States and Paris-based film schools La Femis, Les Gobelins, EICAR and ARTFX for France.

==== French Shorts Competitive Selection ====
French Shorts Selection

- As it used to be, directed by Clément Gonzalez
- J'aime beaucoup ta mère, directed by Rémy Four & Julien War
- La curée, directed by Emmanuel Fricero
- La queue, directed by Yacine Sersar
- Le ballon rouge, directed by Sylvain Bressollette
- Vos violences, directed by Antoine Raimbault
- Personne(s), directed by Marc Fouchard
- Passé composé, directed by Ted Hardy-Carnac
- Tu te souviens ?, directed by Virginie Schwartz

La Femis Shorts Selection

- I don't like to be lonely, directed by Joseph Minster
- Shopping, directed by Vladilen Vierny

Les Gobelins Shorts Selection

- Floating in my mind, directed by Hélène Leroux
- Fol'Amor, directed by Marthe Delaporte
- Meet Meat, directed by Eve Guastella
- Myosis, directed by Emmanuel Asquier-Brassart
- Spotted, directed by Yoann Bomal

ArtFX Shorts Selection

- Atome, directed by Adrien Cappai
- Catch a lot, directed by Yohann Clément
- La grotte dans l'île avec le trésor à l'intérieur, directed by François Audagiori

EICAR Shorts Selection

- Deuxième étage, directed by Natali Soledad Blanco

==== American Shorts Competitive Selection ====
American Shorts Selection

- Amma, directed by Pravin Chottera
- Insomniacs, directed by Charles Chintzer Lai
- Rat Pack Rat, directed by Todd Rohal
- Red, directed by Channing Godfrey Peoples
- The Coin, directed by Fabien Martorell
- Yearbook, directed by Bernardo Britto

USC School of Cinematic Arts Shorts Selection

- A Different Tree, directed by Steven Caple Jr.
- In Passing, directed by Alan Miller
- Matchbox, directed by Ali Kareem

AFI

- Bamidbar, directed by Onn Nir
- The Divide, directed by Ashley Monti

Columbia University Film Festival Shorts Selection

- Aftermath, directed by Jeremy Robbins
- Total Freak, directed by Andrew Ellmaker

=== US in Progress Official Selection ===
- Automatic At Sea, directed by Matthew Lessner
- Creative Control directed by Benjamin Dickinson
- Eugenia and John directed by Hossein Keshavarz
- Winning Dad, directed by Arthur Allen

== Awards ==
Audience Prizes

- Best American Independent Feature-Length Film: Fort Bliss, directed by Claudia Myers
- Best American Short Film: The Coin, directed by Fabien Martorell
- Best French Short Film: La curée, directed by Emmanuel Fricero

Bloggers Jury Award

- Best American Independent Feature-Length Film: American Promise, directed by Michèle Stephenson & Joe Brewster

Youth Jury Award

- Favorite TCM Cinema Essentials classic movie: The Incident, directed by Larry Peerce

US in Progress

- US in Progress Paris Award: Creative Control directed by Benjamin Dickinson

== Festival theaters ==
- Le Balzac
- Gaumont Champs-Élysées
- Le Lincoln
- MK2 Grand-Palais
- Publicis Cinéma
- UGC George V
