= Women on Waves =

Dutch pro-choice non-profit organization

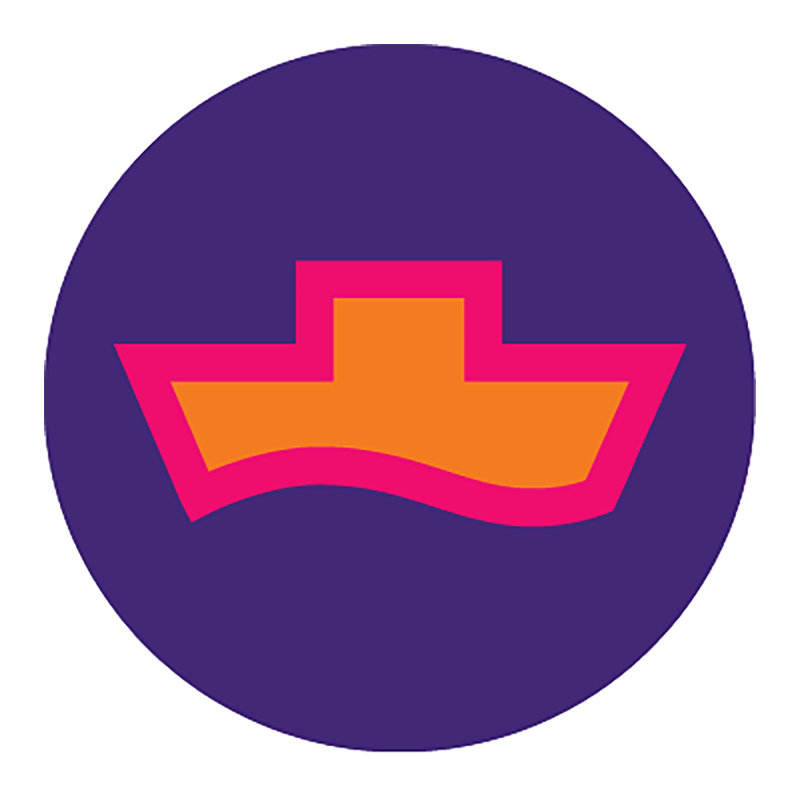
- Abbreviation: WoW
- Formation: 1999
- Type: Nonprofit organisation
- Legal status: Active (1999-present)
- Purpose: Bringing reproductive health services such as abortion and education to countries where these are restricted
- Headquarters: Amsterdam, Netherlands
- Region served: Countries with restricted reproductive health services
- Founder: Rebecca Gomperts
- Website: womenonwaves.org

Women on Waves (WoW) is a Dutch nongovernmental organization (NGO) created in 1999 by Dutch physician Rebecca Gomperts, in order to bring reproductive health services, particularly non-surgical abortion services and education, to women in countries with restrictive abortion laws. Other services offered by WoW include contraception, individual reproductive counseling, workshops, and education about unwanted pregnancy.

== Method and background ==
Workshops are conducted for lawyers, doctors, artists, writers, public health care activists, as well as for women and men to learn about contraceptive practices and non-surgical, self-induced abortion using RU-486 (medication abortion). Services are provided on a commissioned ship that contains a specially constructed mobile clinic, the A-Portable. When WoW visits a country, women make appointments, and are taken on board the ship. The ship then sails out approximately 20 km (12 miles), to international waters, where Dutch laws are in effect on board ships registered in the Netherlands. Once in international waters, the ship's medical personnel provide a range of reproductive health services that includes medical abortion.

According to Gomperts, the first time the ship sailed out, it was a Dutch ship leaving Dutch waters. This meant they could take abortion pills with them to give out in international waters.

The A-Portable was designed by the Dutch studio Atelier van Lieshout and functions as both medical clinic and art installation.

Women on Waves volunteers and personnel have been targeted by governmental authorities, religious organizations, and local groups who are opposed to abortion and/or contraception. The NGO is credited for reviving debates about abortion in the countries where Women on Waves visits.

=== Reproductive rights movement ===
Today, access to abortion is a major focus of certain Dutch organizations and government initiatives. In the Netherlands, abortion is legal up to the 24th week of pregnancy and covered by the Exceptional Medical Expenses Act or health insurers.

Women on waves represents part of the global move for reproductive rights. The ship has been used to test and challenge the limited reproductive rights in countries like Ireland and attempt to create more access to abortion.

More than 9 out of 10 abortions worldwide occur in developing nations like the ones Gomperts and Women on Waves visit. Unsafe abortions in regions where it is outlawed or restricted are a leading cause of maternal death.

Gomperts has faced considerable opposition to Women on Waves. The 2014 documentary Vessel shows anti-abortion protesters in Poland calling her a Nazi in a chant, and in Spain trying to tow the Women on Waves vessel back out to sea.

== Rebecca Gomperts ==
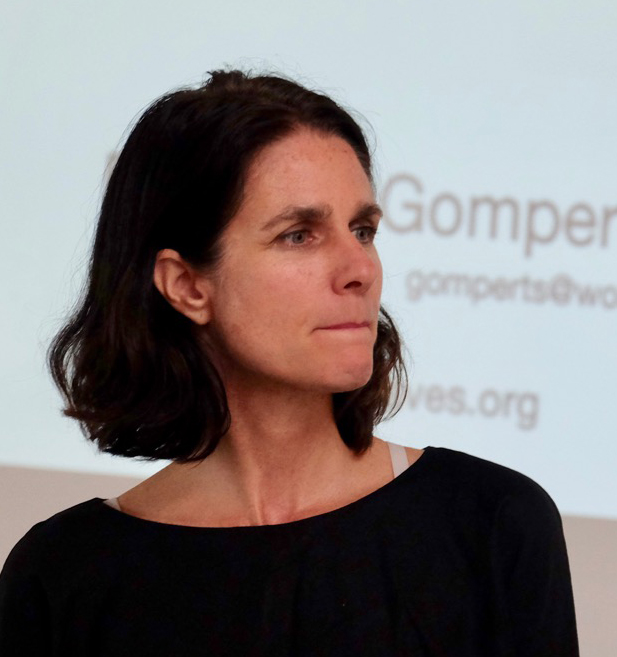
Rebecca Gomperts, Łódź, Poland, 2017

Rebecca Gomperts is a physician in general practice, artist and women's rights activist. Born in 1966, Gomperts grew up in the port town of Vlissingen, the Netherlands. She moved to Amsterdam in the 1980s where she studied art and medicine simultaneously. Drawing on her experiences as a resident physician on the Greenpeace vessel Rainbow Warrior II, which was captained by Bart J. Terwiel, Gomperts created WoW in order to address the health issues created by illegal abortion. While visiting Latin America on board the Rainbow Warrior II, the organization was inspired by a desire to further facilitate social change and women's health. In some developing countries, as many as 800 illegal, unsafe abortions are performed daily, in contrast to some developed nations, such as the Netherlands, where residents have access to safe, legal, medical abortions and contraception. In collaboration with Atelier van Lieshout, she designed a portable gynaecology unit called "A-portable" that can be installed on chartered ships. The stated goals of the organization are to raise awareness and stimulate discussion about laws restricting abortion, as well as to provide safe, non-surgical abortions for women who live in countries where abortion is illegal.

== The A-Portable ==
The mobile gynecological clinic was designed and named by Dutch artist and sculptor Atelier van Lieshout. Known as the A-Portable, the clinic is in a retrofitted shipping container. It is painted a light blue color with the Women on Waves logo painted on the sides. To travel, the shipping container is strapped onto ships registered in the Netherlands, and rented by Women on Waves, which is a nongovernmental organization (NGO). Lambert-Beatty describes the logo, which was designed by Kees Ryter in 2001: [the clinic's] "side is emblazoned with a purple spot on which, in turn, floats an orange shape outlined in pink: a squared cross, one quickly realizes, of the kind that symbolizes humanitarian and medical aid." p. 309

The clinic is a fully functional gynecological clinic offering contraceptive counseling, sonograms, and medical and surgery abortions. It is generally staffed with two physicians and a nurse. Trained volunteers also staff the ship to provide education and counseling. The ship's crew is nearly all female. In ports in countries that allow it, the ship's staff provide workshops on legal and medical issues. During visits to countries with restrictive laws, the ship travels into international waters, usually about 12 miles from land, in order to provide services.

The A-Portable functions as a medical clinic, but is also considered to be a work of art. The original funds to create the A-Portable were awarded by the Mondriaan Foundation, which is a Dutch "publicly financed fund for visual art and cultural heritage." It appeared in Portugal at the Ute Meta Bauer's Women Building Exhibition, in Amsterdam at the Mediamatic art space, and in Artforum. Lambert-Beatty notes that Claire Bishop, an art historian, critic, and professor of art, interprets the A-Portable as "new political art."

== Voyages ==
In 2002, after contentious debate in the Dutch parliament, The Netherlands' Minister of Health, Els Borst, gave permission to medical personnel on board the Women on Waves ship to offer pregnant women RU-486, known colloquially as the abortion pill, on board their boat, Aurora. According to Borst, the decision was in line with the Dutch government's policy on the issue of sexual independence of women. The permission was given on the condition that the abortion pill would only be used to terminate pregnancies of up to nine weeks and would be provided in the presence of a gynaecologist.

Abortion and reproductive laws only extend as far as national borders, including nautical borders. Because of this, Women on waves makes use of added freedom in international waters. The boat sails 20 miles from shore, and takes a day to perform its procedures.

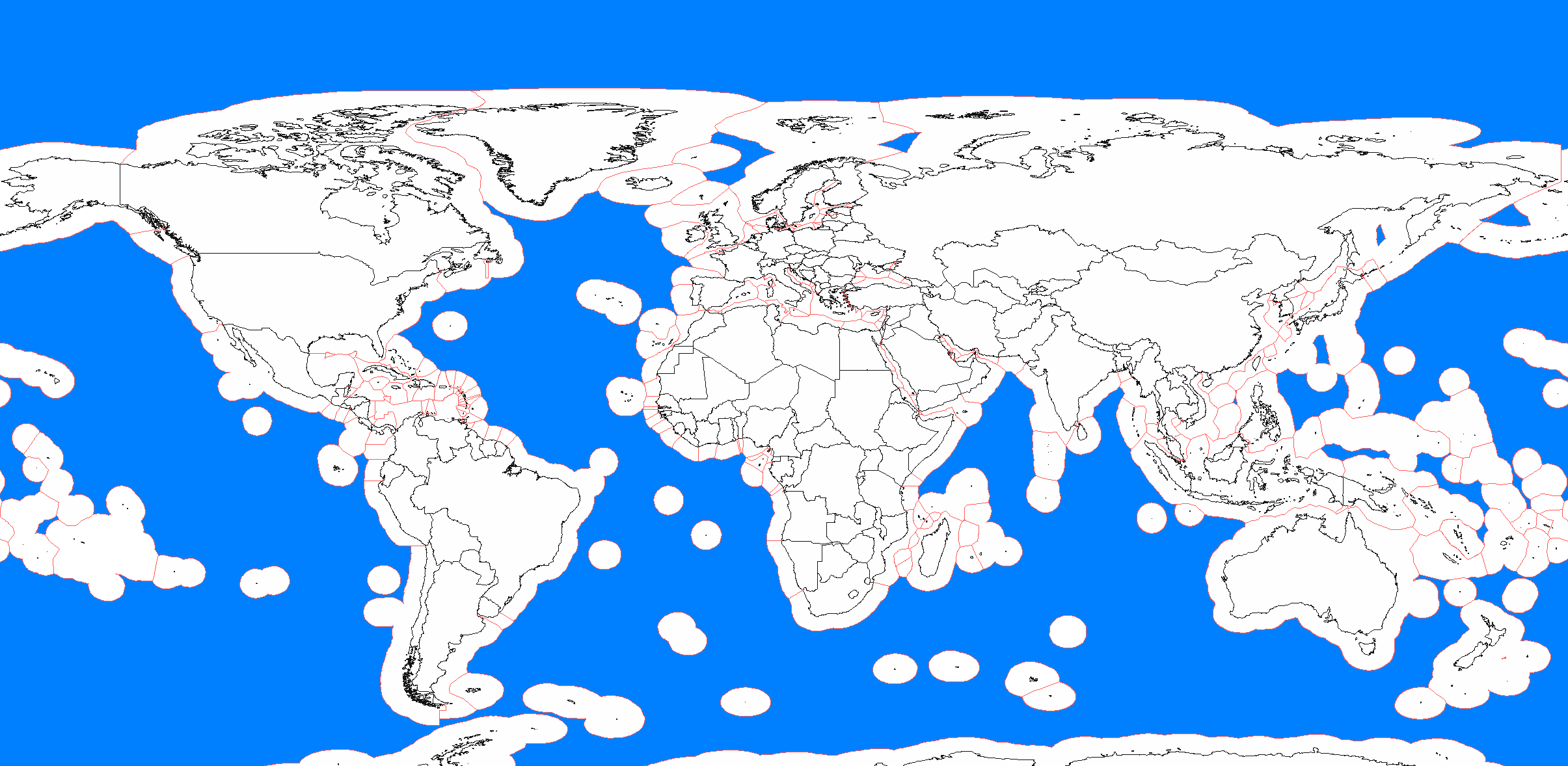
Boundaries of international waters worldwide

=== Ireland ===
Women on Waves made its maiden voyage aboard the Aurora to Ireland in 2001. The ship carried two Dutch doctors and one Dutch nurse. The stated purpose of Women on Waves Ireland was to "catalyze" the Irish movement to liberalize Ireland's abortion laws. At the time, Ireland had the most stringent prohibitions against abortion in Europe, with laws forbidding the procedure that dated to 1861. Women on Waves Ireland provided education about abortion and unwanted pregnancy to individuals and to groups in workshops. On that journey, they were not allowed to do surgical or medical abortions, and were limited by Dutch law to provide only information on contraceptives, and not the contraceptives themselves. The ship had been invited by Irish abortion rights organizations which coordinated a publicity campaign in advance of the Aurora's arrival. The ship anchored at Dublin Port, and traveled into international waters to provide educational services as Ireland's law prohibited discussion about abortion and contraceptives. During the ship's visit to Dublin Port, approximately 300 women participated. All of the ship's services were provided for free.

In 2016, Women on Waves collaborated with pro-abortion groups to use drones and speed boats to deliver abortion pills to women in Northern Ireland.

=== Poland ===
WoW sailed the Langenort to Poland in 2003. Women on Waves was charged with violating Poland's laws against abortion by bringing RU-486, also known as the abortion drug, into Poland. While docked, protesters pelted fake blood and eggs at the ship. Four months afterward, the government of Poland dropped the charges, noting that there was no evidence that Women on Waves had violated Poland's laws. Poland's official polling company, Centrum Badania Opinii Społecznej, found that prior to WoW's visit, 44% of the population supported the liberalization of abortion laws, and that after the visit, the percentage rose to 56%. In 2015, WoW flew a drone carrying abortion pills from Frankfurt an der Oder, Germany across the border to Słubice, Poland. German police attempted to prevent the drones from leaving, but were unsuccessful. Polish police confiscated the drones and the personal iPads of the drones' pilots.

=== Portugal ===
In 2004, the ship Borndiep, carrying the A-Portable, was physically blocked by a naval warship as it attempted to enter Portuguese waters. In 2009, the European Court of Human Rights rendered a decision in favor of the plaintiffs in Women on Waves and Others v. Portugal. The court determined that although Portugal had a right to enforce its laws prohibiting abortion, the nation could have enforced the law in less harmful ways, e.g. by sequestering the abortion drugs that were on board the ship.

=== Spain ===
In 2008, Women on Waves' ship landed in Valencia, Spain, where it had a mixed reception. Some demonstrators supported the group, others opposed it. According to Catholic News Agency,

"On 18 October a group of 40 feminists gathered to counter the pro-life protests, which brought out four times as many people. They passed out boxes of matches with the picture of a burning church and the caption, 'The only church that brings light is the one that burns. Join us!'

On 19 October the feminists met again to distribute matches but decided to disband after they were overwhelmed by the large number of pro-life protesters who gathered at the port where the abortion ship was docked."

As the ship attempted to dock amid protesters on both sides of the issue, harbor patrol agents in a small boat lassoed a rope around the helm of the ship and attempted to pull it away from the dock.

=== Morocco ===
Ibtissam Lachgar of MALI (Mouvement alternatif pour les libertés individuelles) invited Women on Waves to visit Morocco in 2012. On 3 October 2012, the Moroccan health ministry closed the port of Smir to prevent the entry of the Women on Waves ship Langenort. This was the first attempt by Women on Waves to make landfall in a Muslim-majority country. Anti-abortion protesters were present, many carrying signs against abortion. The activist Rebecca Gomperts was at the port to meet the ship, but she was escorted away upon encountering the protesters.

=== Guatemala ===
On 22 February 2017, the WoW ship docked in Puerto Quetzal on the Pacific coast for a planned five-day visit. On 23 February, a scheduled press conference was shut down shortly after it started and a blockade was imposed by Army troops, preventing the activists from disembarking and visitors from boarding. Catholic and other religious leaders and politicians spoke vociferously against the ship and its mission: " 'The boat of death has arrived in Guatemala', said lawmaker Raul Romero during a Congress session earlier on Wednesday." The WoW ship was ejected into international waters by a Guatemalan military ship. The argument to expel the boat was that they lied to the immigration authorities by saying that they were tourists, but in reality they are a health organization that aims to provide abortions to women.

=== Mexico ===
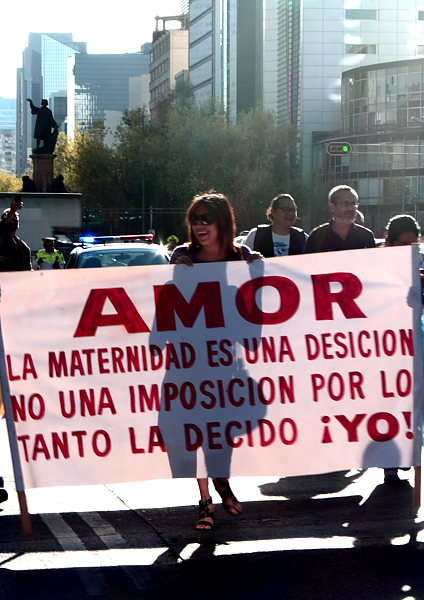
pro-choice protestors in Mexico

In April 2017, the Adelaide ship docked in Ixtapa, Mexico, where abortion procedures were illegal in much of the country. To administer the procedures, the crew ferried the women seeking abortions from Mexico's Pacific coast to the international waters, where Mexican criminal law was not in effect for the ship.

== Documentary ==
In 2014 Vessel, a documentary by Diana Whitten focusing on Women on Waves, premiered at the SXSW Film Festival in Austin, Texas, where it won the Best Documentary Feature audience and special jury awards. 'Vessel' was received fairly positively by critics and audiences. Courtney Small of Cinema Axis called it an "electrifying" look at Gomperts' operation and Ben Kenigsberg of the New York Times called it an "unabashed work of advocacy." The Hollywood Reporter's review said it was unlikely to change audience's opinions on abortion, but called it a moving film. It has a Metacritic Metascore of 68.

The film has garnered multiple other awards including the Audience Award for Documentary in Competition and a Special Jury Award for Political Courage.

== Feminist activism ==
In an academic article published in Signs: Journal of Women in Culture and Society, Carrie Lambert-Beatty claims that "the vessel [is] one of the most audacious instances of feminist activism in recent memory."

== See also ==
- Women on Web
