= Tracy Droz Tragos =

American documentary filmmaker (born 1969)

- Born: Tracy Tilden Droz; January 8, 1969 (age 57); Pittsburgh, U.S.
- Occupations: Director, writer, producer
- Years active: 1996–present
- Notable work: Be Good Smile Pretty, Rich Hill, Plan C
- Spouse: Christian George Tragos

Tracy Droz Tragos (born January 8, 1969) is an American documentary filmmaker. She is known for her documentary films Rich Hill, Abortion: Stories Women Tell, and Plan C.

== Life and career ==
Tragos received her undergraduate degree in fiction writing from Northwestern University and her MFA in screenwriting from the University of Southern California. In 2003, she directed her first documentary, Be Good, Smile Pretty, it aired on PBS's Independent Lens and won an Emmy in the category of best documentary at the News and Documentary Emmy Awards in 2004.

In 2014, along with her first cousin Andrew Droz Palermo, she co-directed Rich Hill, a family drama set in the small Missouri town of Rich Hill. It won the best documentary at the 2014 Sundance Film Festival. Though the film highlights family issues in rural America, Traz Dragos and Palermo, who was also the DP, made sure not to sensationalize poverty, they said when the film screened at the Tribeca Film Festival. Droz Tragos said their deep family roots in the community helped in terms of gaining people's trust. She said that her grandparents, a school teacher and a postal worker "were respected members of the community. So it was on their good name that we made the connections with the subjects. I also made a film [Be Good, Smile Pretty] about my father, who was from that town, and a lot of people in town had seen that film and felt comfortable with me. There was a lot of trust from the get-go."

For Rich Hill, the filmmakers spent so much time with their subjects that they captured nearly 450 hours. The film's editor, Jim Hession, was tasked with paring that down to 93 minutes for the finished film.

In 2016, Tragos directed and produced the documentary Abortion: Stories Women Tell, which was broadcast on HBO and nominated for an Emmy for outstanding social issue documentary at the 37th News and Documentary Emmy Awards. She was the recipient of a 2020 Guggenheim fellowship. In 2021, She directed The Smartest Kids in the World, based on the New York Times bestseller The Smartest Kids in the World.

In 2023, Tragos' documentary, Plan C, premiered at the Sundance Film Festival. Shot over four years, Plan C captures the work of the Plan C campaign activists and providers who began to mail abortion pills during the pandemic.

She is an adjunct professor teaching documentary filmmaking at the USC School of Cinematic Arts.

Tragos is married and has two children.

In January 2025, Tragos' home in Pacific Palisades, Los Angeles burned down due to the Palisades Fire.

== Selected filmography ==
Year	Title	Contribution	Note
2003	Be Good, Smile Pretty	Director and producer	Documentary
2004	The Last Full Measure	Writer	Short film
2005	E! True Hollywood Story	Producer	1 episode
2014	Rich Hill	Director and producer	Documentary
2016	Abortion: Stories Women Tell	Director and producer	Documentary
2021	The Smartest Kids in the World	Director and producer	Documentary
2023	Plan C	Director and producer	Documentary

== Awards and nominations ==
Year	Result	Award	Category	Work	Ref.
2004	Won	News and Documentary Emmy Awards	Best Documentary	Independent Lens:Be Good, Smile Pretty	
2014	Won	Sundance Film Festival	Best Documentary	Independent Lens:Rich Hill	
2014	Won	Sarasota Film Festival	Documentary Directing	Independent Lens:Rich Hill	
2014	Won	Traverse City Film Festival	Best Film	Independent Lens:Rich Hill	
2014	Nominated	Champs-Élysées Film Festival	Best American Feature Film	Independent Lens:Rich Hill	
2015	Nominated	Docaviv	Best International Film	Independent Lens:Rich Hill	
2015	Won	ZagrebDox	Special awards	Independent Lens:Rich Hill	
2016	Nominated	News and Documentary Emmy Awards	Outstanding Business and Economic Reporting - Long Form	Independent Lens:Rich Hill	
2018	Nominated	News and Documentary Emmy Awards	Outstanding Social Issue Documentary	Abortion: Stories Women Tell	
2018	Nominated	Cinema Eye Honors	Outstanding Achievement in Broadcast Nonfiction Filmmaking	Abortion: Stories Women Tell	
2018	Nominated	Doc NYC	Viewfinders Grand Jury Prize	The Smartest Kids in the World	
2023	Nominated	Cleveland International Film Festival	Best Film	Plan C	
2023	Nominated	Nashville Film Festival	Best Documentary Feature	Plan C	
2023	Nominated	South by Southwest	Festival Favorites	Plan C	
