= Francine Coeytaux =

Women's health advocate

- Education: Stanford University; University of California, Los Angeles
- Occupations: Women's health advocate and public health specialist
- Awards: 2013 Ruth Roemer Social Justice Leadership Award; 2011 Carl S. Shultz Award for Lifetime Achievement; 2010 Felicia Stewart Award for Lifetime Achievement in Emergency Contraception
- Website: www.phi.org/people/?name=francine-coeytaux

Francine Coeytaux, founder of the Pacific Institute for Women's Health, is an American-based French public health specialist and abortion rights activist who has developed and evaluated family planning and reproductive health programs. She is known for her work on comprehensive reproductive health services, abortion and new reproductive technologies. She was an Associate at the Population Council in New York City where she started an international program to address the problem of unsafe abortion, collaborated on the public introduction of Norplant and RU 486, and helped develop reproductive health activities in Sub-Saharan Africa.

== Early life and education ==
Coeytaux was born in Switzerland and grew up in Tunisia. She studied at Stanford University where her B.A. was in Latin American History and Human Biology. She obtained an MPH in Demography and Population Studies from the University of California, Los Angeles.

== Career ==
Coeytaux worked for many years in California, US. She contributed in the 1970s to the creation of Planned Parenthood's first adolescent outreach programs in San Francisco and designed a health program for migrant children in five rural counties of California. She has published extensively. She sits on the Boards of EngenderHealth and the Center for Genetics and Society. Coeytaux has consulted for organizations including the World Health Organization, the International Planned Parenthood Federation, the World Bank, the Compton Foundation, and served on the State of California's Advisory Committee on Human Cloning. She was one of the founders of the Reproductive Health Technologies Project. She was one of the founders of the Plan C website and campaign for access to medical abortion.

Coeytaux has received the Ruth Roemer Social Justice Leadership Award and the Felicia Stewart Award for Lifetime Achievement in Emergency Contraception. She has been inducted into the UCLA School of Public Health Alumni Hall of Fame.

== Personal life ==
Coeytaux has lived in Tunisia, Peru, Nicaragua, Switzerland and the United States, and has worked in sub-Saharan Africa and Latin America. She lives in Los Angeles, California, with her husband, David Glanzman. They have two children.

== Publications ==
- Celebrating Mother and Child on the Fortieth Day: The Sfax, Tunisia Postpartum Program (1989)
- Expanding Use of Magnesium Sulfate for Treatment of Pre-eclampsia and Eclampsia: Building Towards Scale in Nigeria (2014), report to MacArthur Foundation, with Sada Danmusa, Jennifer Potts and Elisa Wells
- "Remote Delivery in Reproductive Health Care: Operation of Direct-to-Patient Telehealth Medication Abortion Services in Diverse Settings", with Anna E. Fiastro, Sajal Sanan, Elizabeth Jacob-Files, Elisa Wells, Molly R. Ruben, Ian M. Bennett and Emily M. Godfrey, in Annals of Family Medicine, July 2022
