= Soft secession =

U.S. political and legal theory

Soft secession (also noncooperative federalism) is term in the politics of the United States describing non-cooperation with the US federal government by a city or state. The concept includes political non-compliance on issues such as abortion access, immigration enforcement, vaccination policy, cannabis legalization, and firearm ownership. Recent conservative US Supreme Court decisions emphasizing federalism and states' rights have inadvertently provided the legal arguments that both conservative and liberal states can use to justify political non-cooperation with federal authority.

Blue and red support by county as of the 2024 US presidential election

Formal and soft secession differ in key ways. Unlike formal secession, which was ruled unconstitutional, except when approved by the United States, soft secession does not remove an area from the jurisdiction of the United States. "Soft" secession as a term distinguishes it from unlawful and armed attempts to secede from the United States altogether, as the Confederate States of America did in the 1860s, precipitating the American Civil War. In the years before the American Civil War, the federal Fugitive Slave Acts were ignored by Northern states, an example of political non-cooperation.

The main leverage that could be used in soft secession is if a state normally giving more in taxes to the federal government than it receives back would cease to send tax revenue to the federal government. These states, which generally are blue states governed by a Democratic Party majority, could leverage finances to exert influence over the federal administration, i.e. a Republican administration seen as hostile to their interests.

== Description ==
The idea of blue states pursuing soft secession has emerged as part of an effort to counter the second Trump administration. In theory, wealthy blue states could leverage financial power to mitigate the impacts of Trump's federal government on issues ranging from healthcare and research to immigration and policing.

The challenge states have posed to federal cannabis law through legalization is considered by some a minor example of soft secession, as cannabis remains illegal at the federal level.

In soft secession, a wealthy blue state could retain billions of dollars for its own use rather than send the tax revenue to the federal government. The savings would allow greater state-level expenditure on social programs, public education, clean energy, infrastructure improvements, etc. Soft secession would increase state power and independence over the US federal administration.

Conservative areas of the US have enacted Second Amendment sanctuary laws to stop the enforcement of federal firearm laws.

States and counties that have passed Second Amendment sanctuary (or other pro-Second Amendment) laws or resolutions as of February 17, 2023. Localities within counties that have adopted such resolutions are not displayed in this map. County level State level Both state and county levels

== History ==
In October 2025, Cook County’s top judge signed an order barring ICE from arresting people at court, barring the civil arrest of any “party, witness, or potential witness” while going to court proceedings, including inside courthouses and in parking lots, surrounding sidewalks and entryways. In October 2025, Chicago Mayor Brandon Johnson signed the “ICE Free Zone” executive order, prohibiting federal immigration agents from using any City-owned property in their ongoing operations in Chicago. Johnson then signed the ICE On Notice executive order instructing Chicago Police to prosecute crimes committed by ICE.

In October 2025, 15 states and territories formed the Governors Public Health Alliance to counter the absence of federal leadership by tracking disease outbreaks, issuing guidance, buying vaccines, etc. Members of the Public Health Alliance include California, Colorado, Connecticut, Delaware, Guam, Hawaii, Illinois, Maryland, Massachusetts, New Jersey, New York, North Carolina, Oregon, Rhode Island, and the state of Washington.

New Jersey Governor-elect Mikie Sherrill was a guest on comedian Jon Stewart’s podcast where she floated the idea that New Jersey could withhold federal tax dollars in protest of the Trump administration.

In February 2026, Denver mayor Mike Johnston announced an executive order banning ICE agents from city property and requiring that Denver law enforcement protect peaceful protesters at the scenes of ICE operations, allowing the arrest of ICE agents. Denver’s executive order to constrain ICE was signed after the killing of Renee Good and Alex Pretti in ICE violence in Minneapolis.

== Criticism ==
Some critique soft secession as having costs that overshadow potential benefits. When proponents argue that blue states should cease subsidizing red states, one major downside pointed out is that disrupting the economy would not just harm the federal government or Republican states, but also blue economies.

== See also ==
- Trumpism
- Abortion shield laws in the United States
- Printz v. United States
- Murphy v. NCAA
- ICE On Notice
- 2025 deployment of federal forces in the United States
- Laboratories of democracy
- Targeting of political opponents and civil society under the second Trump administration
- Red states and blue states
