= Vessel (film) =

- Film poster
- Directed by: Diana Whitten
- Written by: Diana Whitten
- Produced by: Diana Whitten; Elissa Brown; Mitchell Block
- Starring: Rebecca Gomperts
- Cinematography: Diana Whitten
- Edited by: Simeon Hutner
- Music by: Todd Griffin; Heather McIntosh
- Production companies: Sovereignty Productions; in association with: Fork Films; Impact Partners; Chicken and Egg Pictures
- Distributed by: Filmbuff
- Release date: March 9, 2014 (SXSW)
- Running time: 90 minutes
- Countries: USA, Tanzania; Spain, Portugal; Poland, Pakistan; Netherlands, Ireland; Indonesia, Ecuador
- Language: English
- Box office: $800 thousand

Vessel is a 2014 multi-national documentary film written and directed by Diana Whitten as her debut film, focusing on the work of Women on Waves, a Dutch pro-choice organization founded by the Dutch physician Rebecca Gomperts in 1999. The film's world premiere took place at SXSW in Texas on March 9, 2014. The film has been distributed by Filmbuff since 2015.

== Synopsis ==
The film focuses on Dr. Rebecca Gomperts' work with her organization 'Women on Waves', as she sails a ship around the world and provides abortions at sea for women who have no legal alternative. Gomperts meets opposition, but when each is overcome, she refines her mission and eventually realizes she can use new technologies to bypass existing laws. She trains women to give themselves abortions using WHO-researched protocols with pills, and creates an underground network of empowered activists who trust women to handle abortion themselves.

== Cast ==
The film features Rebecca Gomperts, Susan Davies, Veronica Vera, Kinga Jelinska, Cecilia Costa, Gunilla Kleiverda, Myra ter Meulen, Margreet Parlevliet, Juul Brockling, Lizet Kraal, Margie Moore, Ivette Mrova, Annemarie van den Heuvel, Ana Cristina Santos, Sara larrea, Ana Cristina Vera, Paula Castello Starkoff, Manuela Luna Creciente, and Nondo Ebuela Ejano, with voice-over by Kinga Jelinska and Inês Rodrigues.

== Production ==
The film took seven years to make.

== Recognition ==
=== Reception ===
Vessel was given a mixed review by Indiewire critic Eric Kohn, who wrote that "the hot button topic [abortion] begs for a more dynamic treatment."

=== Awards and nominations ===
At the 2014 South by Southwest Film Festival the film was nominated for the 'SXSW Grand Jury Award' and won both the 'Audience Award' and 'Special Jury Awards' for Documentary Feature. At the 2014 Sheffield International Documentary Festival, the film won the Peter Wintonick Award. At the Nantucket Film Festival, the film won the Adrienne Shelly Excellence In Filmmaking Award.
