= Izifozonke =

African commercial herbal mixture

Izifozonke is a commercial herbal mixture used in South African traditional medicine. It has been used by consumers seeking HIV treatment and self-induced abortions. It is categorized as a "general tonic," and the potion's tagline is "amazing mixture for all diseases". Other commercial herbal preparations sold in South African markets include Tokoloshe salts, Tshepe, Impotex forte, Sex sugar, and Fire-BarkTea, a product made of Bangalala root and marketed to men.
