= Stametta =

South African commercial herbal mixture

Stametta is a brand-name commercial herbal mixture sold in South Africa that is advertised as an "immune booster". Stametta has also been provided to women seeking a self-induced abortion. One of the ingredients may be aloe.
