= Rebecca Gomperts =

Dutch physician and activist (born 1966)

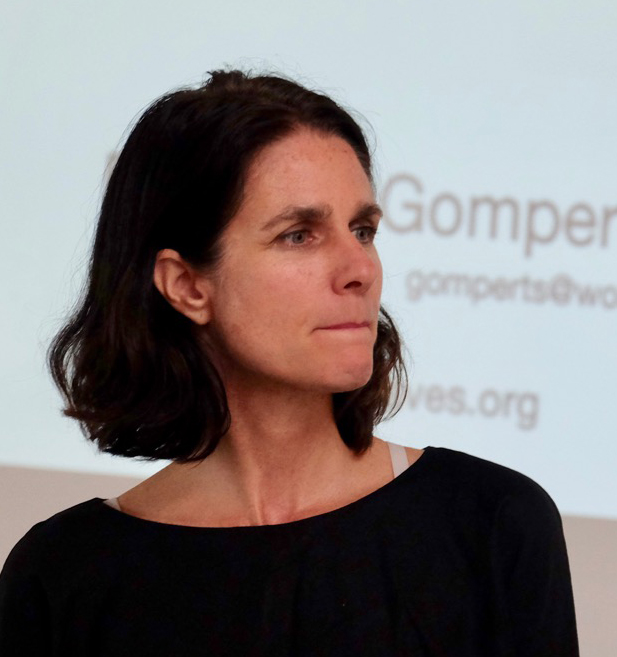
- Gomperts in 2017
- Born: 1966 (age 59–60); Paramaribo, Suriname
- Education: Gerrit Rietveld Academie; Princeton University (MPP); Karolinska Institutet (PhD)
- Occupation: Physician
- Known for: Abortion rights

Rebecca Gomperts (born 1966) is a Dutch physician and activist for women's rights, in particular abortion rights. She is the founder of Women on Waves and Women on Web, which provide reproductive health services for women in countries where they are not available. In 2013 and 2014, Gomperts was included in the BBC's 100 Women. In 2018, she founded Aid Access, which operates in the United States. A trained abortion specialist and activist, she is generally considered the first abortion rights activist to cross international borders.

Gomperts was included in Time's 100 Most Influential People in 2020.

== Early life and education ==
Rebecca Gomperts was born in 1966 in Paramaribo in Suriname. Her family moved to the Netherlands when she was three years old and she grew up in the harbor town of Vlissingen. Although she grew up in a small town, an international consciousness was instilled in her that would drive her future career.

Gomperts moved to Amsterdam in the mid-1980s after high school. Having an interest for both the arts and sciences, she studied visual arts and medicine. She studied conceptual art and completed a four-year art degree at Amsterdam's Rietveld Academy, attending medical school at the same time.

In 2011, she completed a Masters of Public Policy at Princeton University and in 2014 she was awarded a PhD from the Karolinska Institutet.

== Career ==
=== Early career ===
After graduating from medical school, Gomperts worked in a small hospital in Guiana as a trainee doctor. While working in Guiana, she witnessed the realities of illegal abortions for the first time. As of 1997, she was a 31-year-old doctor based in Amsterdam who performed legal abortions.

Between 1997 and 1998, Gomperts sailed with a Greenpeace ship called the Rainbow Warrior II as a resident physician and environmental activist. She sailed through Latin America, visiting Romania and Guinea.

=== Women on Waves ===
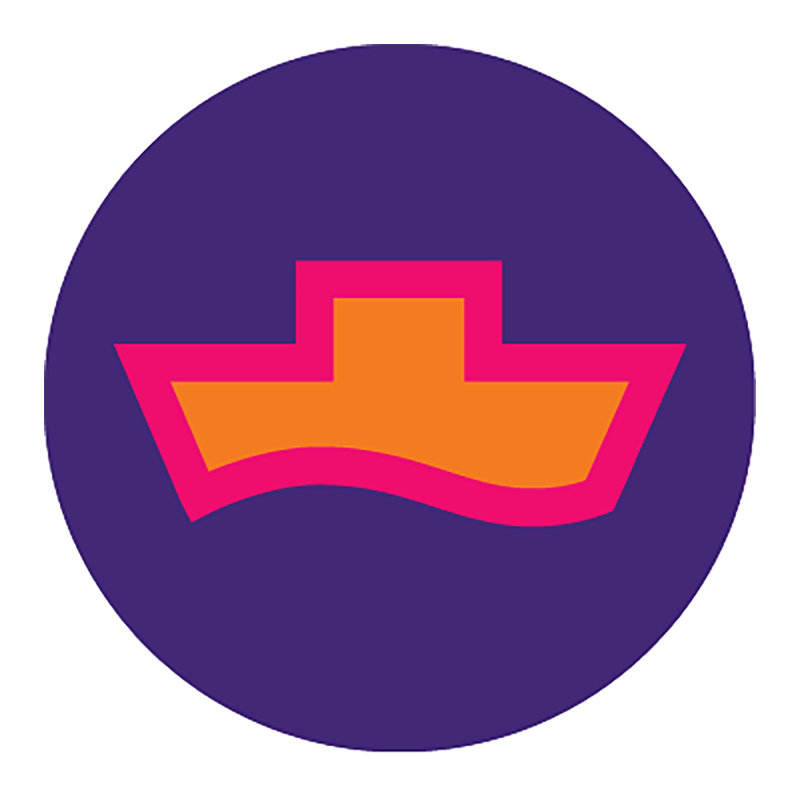
Women on Waves logo

After her travels with Greenpeace, Gomperts's interest in reproductive health increased. Gomperts wanted the health damages and death rates from botched at-home abortions to decline, so she designed a program founded upon the radical idea that women could do safe abortions and get medical abortions performed in places where abortion clinics are highly restricted or do not exist at all.

Gomperts used contacts she had made during art school to help her design and fund a mobile clinic. A close friend of hers, Joep van Lieshout, agreed to help design the clinic. The clinic was called A-Portable. Dr. Gomperts said they already had in place the $50,000 mobile clinic that was being built to be placed aboard a ship; she and her colleagues needed to raise $190,000 to charter a Dutch ship. The grant for the mobile clinic came from the Mondriaan Foundation. Gomperts's background in art helped her execute this vision. The A-Portable was labelled a functional work of art. This meant that whenever a transport ministry tried to confiscate the container on national waters, the certification of the A-Portable as a sculpture made its border crossing legal.

Gomperts formed the organization Women on Waves in 1999 after she returned from her voyage on the Rainbow Warrior II. Women on Waves brought non-surgical abortion services and education to countries around the world that did not offer them. Using the grant from the Mondriaan Foundation, Women on Waves rented a boat on which the mobile clinic would be held. Concerns expressed included the safety of patients traveling to and from the ship, follow-up care to avoid infection, and whether Women on Waves would even be allowed to anchor in some ports to offer training, contraceptives and information.

Women on Waves made many voyages. News spread quickly that Gomperts was trying to reach countries where abortion was illegal, and many nations took measures to stop her. Women on Waves traveled to Ireland, Poland, Portugal, Spain, Morocco, and Guatemala. Although the first eleven-day trip to Dublin was deemed unsuccessful by the media, Women On Waves had received more than 200 abortion requests from women ashore who needed their help. Women on Waves intended to help create legal precedent in the grey areas of nations' abortion laws, to reach women who had been refused abortions by their own physicians, and to prevent the dangers of unsafe abortion procedures.

Women on Waves faced many challenges during its voyages. On one of Gomperts's trips to Portugal, her mobile clinic was not allowed to dock. Gomperts appeared on a Portuguese talk show instead. She talked about how women could perform safe abortions by themselves at home and how they could obtain and take abortion pills. Gomperts realized that she could reach more people through the internet than she could in a boat. "In the end our ship will never be a structural solution for the enormous number of women who need abortions", said Gomperts.

==== Art exhibitions ====
After Women on Waves gained some international recognition, it began to participate in art exhibitions around the world. The A-Portable was exhibited in the 49th Venice Biennale in 2001. It was presented on a raft, floating just out in the waters at the Arsenale.

There were four other exhibitions in 2001 where Gomperts collaborated with Willem Velthoven. These four installations, Portrait Collector, Sea, I Had An Abortion and Every 6 Minutes, were presented in the Mediamatic Women on Waves show. Portrait Collector was a collection of internet kiosks where viewers who had had abortions could photograph themselves and become part of the exhibition. Gomperts aimed to show how often abortions occur. Sea was an interactive narrative composed of shots of the sea taken on Women on Waves' first exhibition to Ireland. Its audio component was a poetic work of voices of women asking Women on Waves for help. I Had An Abortion featured wire coat hangers with vests hung on them. Each vest had "I Had An Abortion" written on it in all European languages. The final installation, Every 6 Minutes, had a very simple message. Every six minutes a red lamp flashed, symbolizing the statistic that a woman dies from an unsafe abortion every six minutes.

On July 12, 2003, the Mediamatic Supermarkt entrance was blocked with the A-Portable. This interactive exhibition presented by Mediamatic was the final installation of their Women On Waves exhibition. It allowed viewers to walk into the portable container that was transformed into an abortion clinic and sailed across international waters.

In March 2026, Women on Web was invited to exhibit at the Malta Biennale. A controversy arose as the Biennale demanded the artwork be removed and several news outlets reported on issues of censorship. The work was reportedly finally not removed due to the inability to find a ladder high enough (sic).

=== Women on Web ===
In 2005, Gomperts' founded Women on Web. As of 2016, Women on Web was receiving more than 10,000 emails a month from more than 123 countries. Women asked for advice on abortion pills, contraceptives, and relationships. Instead of delivering abortion pills from the sea, Women on Web uses packages and drones to send pills and instructions for safe, at-home abortions.

Women on Web launched an ad campaign that utilized barcodes hidden in plain sight within images. If scanned, the barcodes provided viewers with information on the abortion pill In 2023 Gomperts left the organisation, where she had remained as the scientific director.

=== Aid Access ===
In 2018, Gomperts founded Aid Access, which operates both in the United States and globally. Aid Access initially has shipped mifepristone and misoprostol from a pharmacy in India to "tens of thousands of people in the USA", who complete online forms, exclude contraindications, and report a gestation of 10 weeks or less. As of 2023, Aid Access has provided the prescriptions through American health care providers.

=== Research ===
Rebecca Gomperts has co-authored numerous scientific papers, including:

- Telemedicine for medical abortion: a systematic review, M Endler, A Lavelanet, A Cleeve, B Ganatra, R Gomperts, ...BJOG: An International Journal of Obstetrics & Gynaecology 126 (9), 1094-1102
- Using telemedicine for termination of pregnancy with mifepristone and misoprostol in settings where there is no access to safe services, RJ Gomperts, K Jelinska, S Davies, K Gemzell‐Danielsson, G Kleiverda, BJOG: An International Journal of Obstetrics & Gynaecology 115 (9), 1171-1178
- Self reported outcomes and adverse events after medical abortion through online telemedicine: population based study in the Republic of Ireland and Northern Ireland, ARA Aiken, I Digol, J Trussell, R Gomperts, bmj 357
- Requests for abortion in Latin America related to concern about Zika virus exposure, ARA Aiken, JG Scott, R Gomperts, J Trussell, M Worrell, CE Aiken, New England Journal of Medicine 375 (4), 396-398

=== Recognition and awards ===
- 2001: Ms magazine Women of the year
- 2002: Clara Meijer-Wichmann medal
- 2002: Women making History award by Planned Parenthood of New York City
- 2004: “Margaret Sanger Woman of Valor Award” Planned Parenthood New York City
- 2005: The 1000 PeaceWomen are activists from around the world who were collectively nominated for the 2005 Nobel Peace Prize
- 2005: Rosie Jimenez Award from the Women's Medical Fund
- 2007: Global Women’s Rights Awards, Feminist Majority Foundation, Los Angeles, USA
- 2011: First "Women Deliver 100" list marks 100th International Women's Day, featuring women and men who have fought to improve girls' and women's lives worldwide
- 2012: Allan Rosenfield Award for Lifetime Contributions to International Family Planning by the Society of Family Planning
- 2013: BBC 100 Women: 100 Women: Rebecca Gomperts and the abortion ship
- 2015: Foreign Policy list global thinkers
- 2015: Els Borst Oeuvreprijs by the Association of Dutch Women Doctors (VNVA)
- 2020: Time's 100 list of most influential people of the world
- 2022: MS magazine top feminists
- 2022: Aletta Jacobs prize
- 2022: Glamour women of the year
- 2022: Bloomberg 50: The people and ideas that defined global business in 2022
- 2022: The Financial Times 25 most influential women
- 2023: Lovie Special Activist of the Year Award
- 2024: Princeton School of Public and International Affairs Dean's Leadership lecture by Rebecca Gomperts: The State of Women's Healthcare
- 2024: Financial Times readers 25 women of 2024
- 2025: Washington Post Next 50 - 50 people shaping our society in 2025
- 2025: STAT's 2025 STATUS List features 50 influential people shaping the future of health and life sciences across biotech, medicine, health care, policy, and health tech.

== Documentary ==
Vessel, an award winning documentary about Women on Waves, premiered in 2014 at the Southwest Film Festival. This documentary depicts the creation of a network of reproductive health activists led by Gomperts.

== Personal life ==
Gomperts has two children and lives in Amsterdam.
