= ICE On Notice =

2026 Chicago executive order

ICE On Notice (Executive Order 2026-01) is an executive order signed by Chicago Mayor Brandon Johnson directing the Chicago Police Department to investigate and document alleged illegal activity by federal immigration agents and refer evidence of felony violations to the Cook County State's Attorney's Office for prosecution. Johnson stated on Twitter: “With today’s order, we are putting ICE on notice in our city. Chicago is leading the way as the first city to create infrastructure for holding ICE and CBP agents accountable for crimes against our communities”. Executive Order 2026-01 was signed after months of federal immigration operations codenamed “Operation Midway Blitz.”

== See also ==
- Soft secession
