= Abortion: Stories Women Tell =

- Theatrical release poster
- Directed by: Tracy Droz Tragos
- Produced by: Tracy Droz Tragos
- Cinematography: Kamau Bilal; Judy Phu
- Edited by: Christopher Roldan; Monique Zavistovski; Dan Duran
- Music by: Nathan Halpern
- Production company: Dinky Pictures
- Distributed by: HBO Documentary Films
- Release dates: April 18, 2016 (Tribeca Film Festival); August 12, 2016 (United States)
- Running time: 93 minutes
- Country: United States
- Language: English

Abortion: Stories Women Tell is a 2016 American documentary film directed and produced by Tracy Droz Tragos. The film centers on different women on either side of the abortion debate in the state of Missouri. It had its premiere at the 2016 Tribeca Film Festival on April 18.

== Production ==
Director Tracy Droz Tragos told IndieWire that she began filming in September 2014, when a 72-hour waiting period abortion law in Missouri was being prepared. She said in a separate interview from Uproxx that the primary intention for the film was "not to make a political film but to make a film that was personal and that gave voice to women and patients and the circumstances that women face. To really wrestle it away from the political, rhetorical, abstract realm and return it to real women." In an editorial for Time magazine, Tragos wrote that she had to set aside the use of social media such as Twitter and Facebook for two years before filming.

== Release ==
Abortion: Stories Women Tell had its premiere at the Tribeca Film Festival on April 18, 2016. It was released in select theaters on August 12, 2016 in the United States.

== Reception ==
The review aggregation website Rotten Tomatoes gives the film a score of 100% based on 14 reviews—an average rating of 7.2 out of 10. Metacritic offers an average score of 78% based on eight critics, indicating "generally favorable" reviews.

Claudia Puig for TheWrap wrote, "[W]hile this well-made film is unlikely to change minds on the controversial issue, by giving women an opportunity to recount their experiences, Abortion: Stories Women Tell should, at the very least, least touch hearts." Amy Brady for The Village Voice described it "a tearjerker, but it's also enraging". Brian Lowry for CNN called it "spare and sober" though "unlikely to change many hearts or minds". Brian Tallerico for RogerEbert.com gave a score of three out of four stars, writing: "While Abortion: Stories Women Tell strengthens its clear pro-choice stance by allowing the other side some time in front of the camera, it is not an overtly political film ... it is the women and their stories that matter."

== See also ==
- Lake of Fire (film)
- Trapped (2016 film)
- Abortion debate
- Abortion law
- Abortion in the United States
- List of films with a 100% rating on Rotten Tomatoes
