= Amanda Ripley =

American journalist

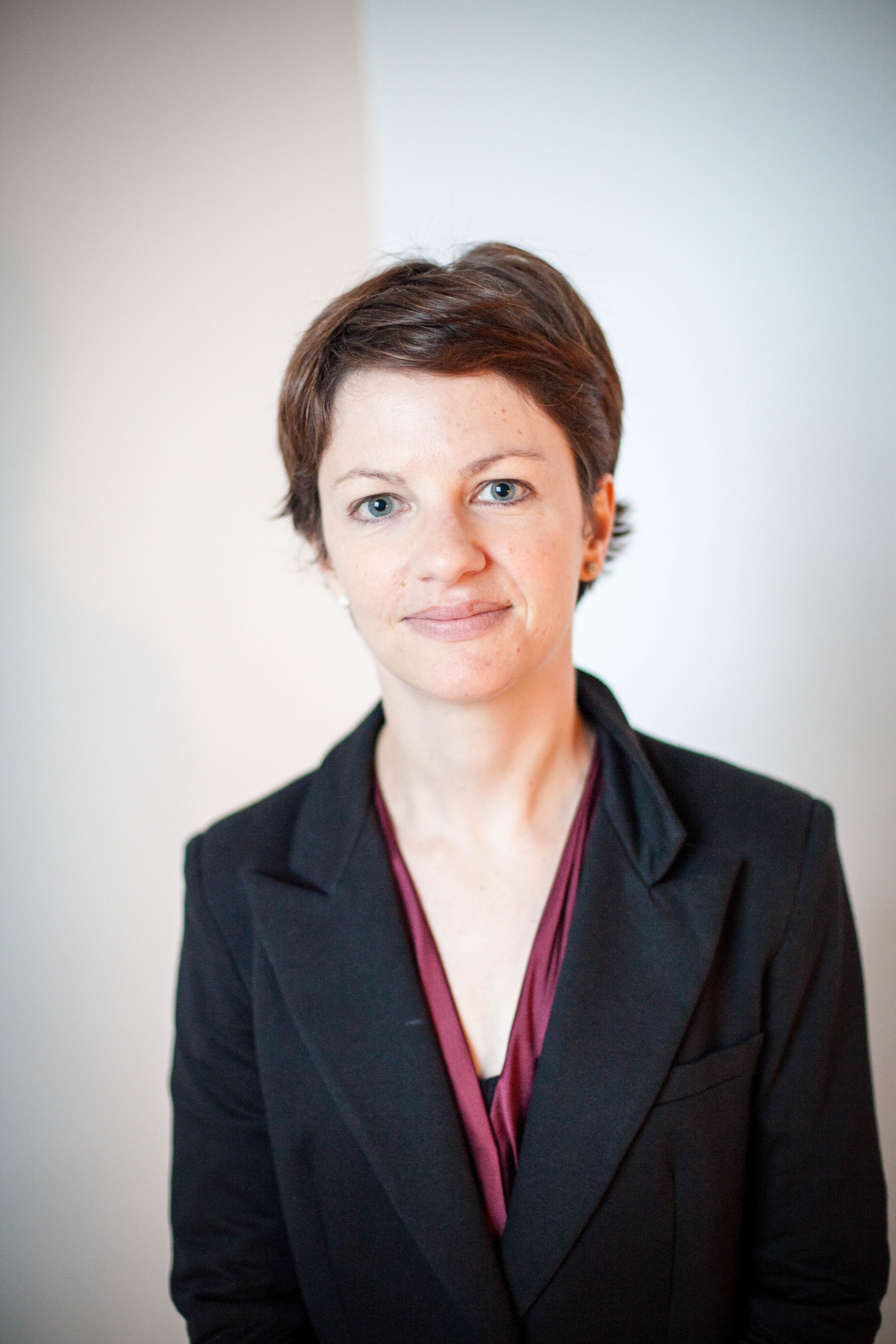
- Born: Arizona
- Education: Cornell University (BA)
- Occupation: Journalist
- Writing career
- Genre: non-fiction

Amanda Ripley is an American journalist and author. She has written features for Time magazine, and contributes to The Atlantic. Her book The Smartest Kids in the World was a New York Times bestseller.

== Biography ==
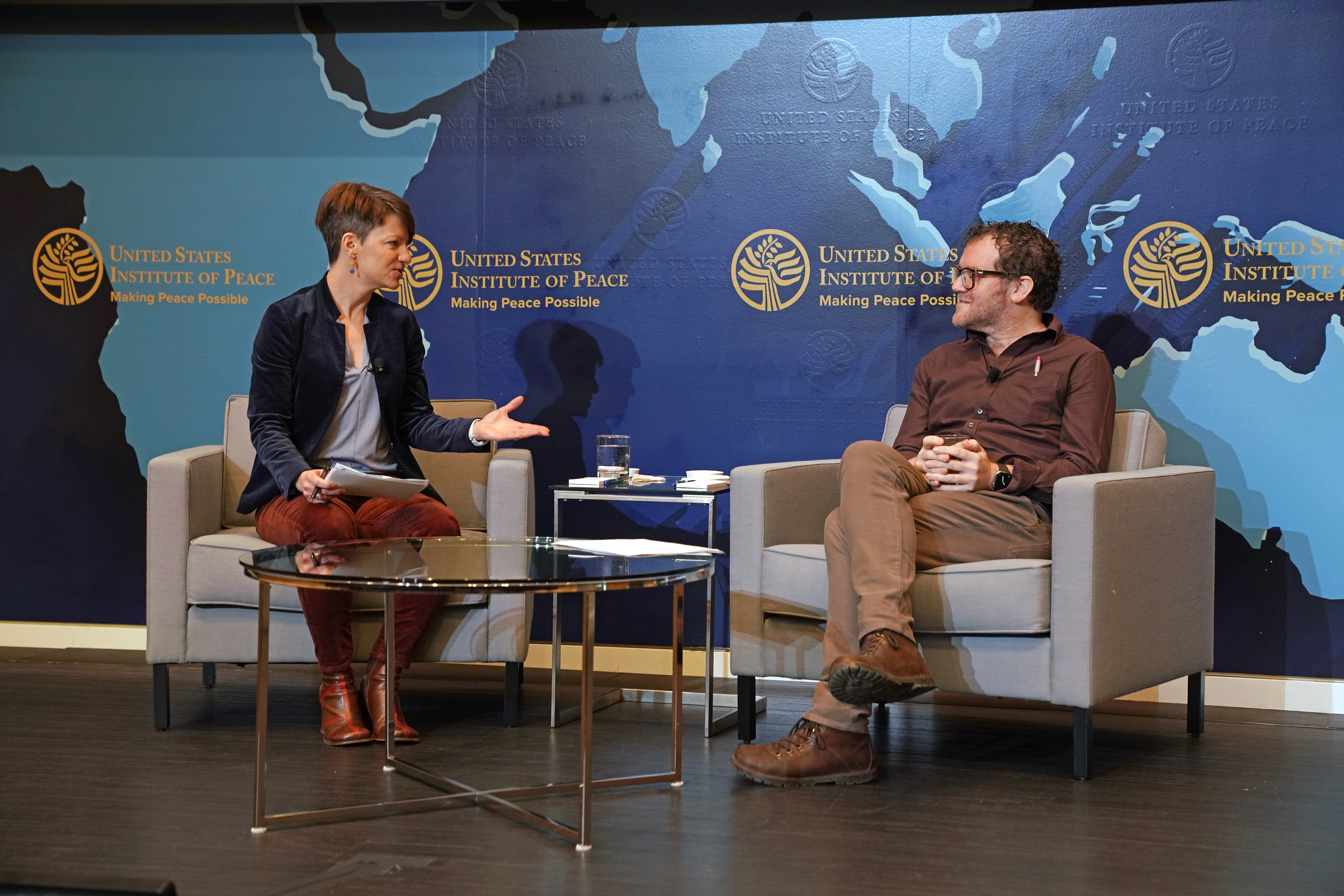
Amanda Ripley and poet Pádraig Ó Tuama at the United States Institute for Peace in 2023

Amanda Ripley was born in Arizona and grew up in New Jersey. She graduated Phi Beta Kappa from Cornell University in 1996 with a B.A. in government.

After covering Capitol Hill for Congressional Quarterly, she worked on long-form feature stories for the Washington City Paper under editor David Carr. She then spent a decade working for Time magazine from New York, Washington and Paris. She covered the 9/11 terrorist attacks, the 2001 anthrax investigation, and Hurricanes Katrina and Rita, helping Time win two National Magazine Awards.

Ripley has written three nonfiction books about human behavior, including The Smartest Kids in the World, a New York Times bestseller. In 2018, she became certified in conflict mediation and began training journalists to cover polarizing conflicts, in partnership with the Solutions Journalism Network. Ripley writes op-eds for The Washington Post, and feature articles for Politico and The Atlantic, where she is a contributing writer. She also hosts the "How To!" show for Slate magazine.

She lives in Washington, D.C., with her husband. Her brother is the screenwriter Ben Ripley.

== Works ==
=== Books ===
- 2009. The Unthinkable: Who Survives when Disaster Strikes - and Why. New York: Arrow Books. ISBN 9780099525721, OCLC 972068736.
- 2014. The Smartest Kids in the World: And How They Got That Way New York, NY: Simon & Schuster Paperbacks. ISBN 9781451654431, OCLC 862348013. NYT Hardcover Nonfiction Bestseller, September 22, 2013.
- 2021. High Conflict: Why We Get Trapped and How We Get Out. New York, NY: Simon & Schuster. ISBN 9781982128562, OCLC 10581323837.

=== Selected articles ===
- 2010. "What Makes a Great Teacher?" The Atlantic. January/February issue.
- 2013. "The Case Against High School Sports." The Atlantic. October issue.
- 2016. "How America Outlawed Adolescence." The Atlantic. November issue.
- 2018. "Complicating the Narratives." The Whole Story.
- 2019. "The Least Politically Prejudiced Place in America." The Atlantic.
- 2020. "We've Created Cartoonish Narratives About People in the Opposite Party. They're Not True." The Washington Post.
- 2022. "I stopped reading the news. Is the problem me — or the product?" The Washington Post.
