= The Massachusetts Medication Abortion Access Project =

American healthcare business

- Industry: Consumer healthcare company
- Founded: 2023; 3 years ago U.S.
- Founder: Angel Foster
- Headquarters: Boston, Massachusetts, U.S.
- Website: www.cambridgereproductivehealthconsultants.org/map

The Massachusetts Medication Abortion Access Project, also known as The MAP, is a Boston-based non-profit healthcare company that provides abortion-related healthcare services in the United States.

The Massachusetts Medication Abortion Access Project was founded by Angel Foster in 2023. The MAP is a subsidiary of Cambridge Reproductive Health Consultants.

The company's primary service is providing reproductive healthcare consultations, primarily related to abortion. If medication abortion is indicated, the organization also fills the prescription and mails it to the patients.

The company sends prescriptions to all states within the United States, even those where abortion is illegal. The company relies on Massachusetts shield laws for protection.
