= Felicia Stewart =

American doctor

Felicia H. Stewart (1943–2006) was a women's health physician and expert in the field of reproductive health.

== Education ==
Stewart was a Phi Beta Kappa graduate of the University of California, Berkeley, with honors in Biochemistry. In 1969, she received her medical degree from Harvard Medical School. Stewart completed her post-graduate training at Cambridge City Hospital and at the UCSF Medical Center.

== Career ==
From 1999 to 2006 Stewart served as Director and Professor at the Center for Reproductive Health Research and Policy at the University of California, San Francisco. The Center was established to integrate research, policy development, clinical services and training efforts of UCSF faculty across the disciplines of contraception, abortion, and sexually transmitted infection.

Prior to her appointment at UCSF, Stewart directed the Reproductive Health Program at the Henry J. Kaiser Family Foundation where she was responsible for grant making in the field of reproductive health and in supporting the Foundation’s work with media and public education.

In the mid-1990s, Stewart served as Deputy Assistant Secretary for Population Affairs for the United States Department of Health and Human Services where she helped formulate and implement domestic and international policies on family planning and population issues. In this position, she had direct responsibility for management of the National Family Planning Program (Title X) and the Adolescent Family Life Program (Title XX).

Stewart wrote Understanding Your Body: The Concerned Women’s Guide to Gynecology and Health, a non-technical reference book, and was co-author of Contraceptive Technology, a major reference source in the field of family planning. She was a nationally recognized lecturer and expert in the field of reproductive health. Her special research interest in contraceptive development led to numerous clinical studies carried out in conjunction with her clinical practice.

== Legacy ==
The American Public Health Association presents the Felicia Stewart Advocacy Award in her memory. The American Society for Emergency Contraception presents the Felicia Stewart Award for Lifetime Achievement in EC.
