= Aid Access =

Abortion services provider

- Formation: March 2018; 8 years ago
- Founder: Rebecca Gomperts
- Type: Nonprofit organization
- Headquarters: Austria
- Services: Telemedicine prescription of medication abortion pills for delivery by mail
- Website: www.aidaccess.org

Aid Access is a nonprofit organization that provides access to medication abortion by mail to the United States and worldwide. It was founded in 2018 by Dutch physician Rebecca Gomperts who describes its work as a harm reduction strategy designed to provide safe access to mifepristone and misoprostol for people who may not otherwise have access to abortion or miscarriage management services. Their online abortion pill service mails pills to people in all 50 U.S. states so they can manage their own abortion with remote access to a physician and a help-desk for any questions.

From its launch in 2018 until mid-2023, Aid Access prescriptions were filled by a pharmacy in India and mailed to U.S. patients. Since 2023, Aid Access has utilized Shield laws to partner with U.S.-licensed clinicians and pharmacies to provide domestic shipping within 1–5 days. Their online abortion pill service costs $150, but they also offer a sliding scale payment option for those who cannot afford the full price.

== History ==
Gomperts, a physician based in the Netherlands, started Aid Access in March 2018, to provide access to medication abortion in countries like the United States where abortion is legal but may be hard to access. Aid Access was incorporated in Austria, where Gomperts is registered to practice medicine.

In 2019, Aid Access received a warning letter from the Food and Drug Administration (FDA) stating that they were not authorized to distribute generic mifepristone in the US. Aid Access in turn sued the FDA, stating that they were helping women exercise their constitutional right to abortion. The FDA pursued no further legal action, and the lawsuit ended. In 2021, the FDA made telemedicine abortion permanently legal.

In 2021, Aid Access started offering "advanced provision" pills, whereby someone can order the pills ahead of time in case they might need them in the future.

In October 2018, after six months of non-publicized operation, Gomperts stated that she had fulfilled about 600 requests for pills (an average of 3 per day). By February 2022, she said that she had served over 30,000 people in the US. In January 2023, she said that they receive about 4,000 requests per month. In 2024, she said that over 6,000 people each month receive pills from Aid Access in US states with abortion bans.

=== Shield laws ===
In 2022 a paper was published in the Columbia Law Review about ways in which US shield laws could protect medical practitioners providing abortion who treated patients in banned states. Following publication of the paper, several states passed shield laws for medical practitioners. As of July 2023 fifteen states had shield laws, and five had telemedicine provisions, specifically protecting a provider who prescribed and mailed medication abortion pills to a patient in a state where abortion was banned. Aid Access began serving patients throughout the US in June 2023 with providers licensed in the five states with telemedicine provisions. With no further need to ship packages from other countries, their delivery times decreased from 3–4 weeks down to 2–5 days.

By mid-2025, the list of U.S.-based telehealth abortion pills providers that utilize shield law protections to offer 1-5 day domestic shipping and prices of $150 or less had expanded to include The MAP, We Take Care of Us, Choices Rising, and A Safe Choice, and Abuzz, each of which also offer 1-5 day shipping times and prices of $150 or less.

=== FDA warning letter and lawsuit ===
In March 2019, the United States Food and Drug Administration (FDA) sent AidAccess.org a letter warning it to cease selling the generic drug mifepristone, which they said was a "misbranded and unapproved new drug" in the United States. In a statement three days later, the National Women's Health Network stated that this was a politicized attack against medical abortion, rather than a broader attempt to curb online drug sales. In May 2019, over 100 anti-abortion members of Congress sent a letter thanking the Trump administration and the FDA for this action, even though major medical organizations stated that medication abortion is safe for use at home and should be more readily available. Gomperts did not comply with the warning and stated that she was not selling medications in the United States, since she sent the prescriptions to an independent pharmacy, which then dispensed the medications.

In September 2019, on behalf of Aid Access, Gomperts sued the FDA, Alex Azar (then secretary for the Department of Health and Human Services) as well as other federal officials for seizing several packages containing medications and blocking transfer of some payments to Aid Access. The goals of the suit were to stop these actions as well as to stop FDA prosecution of Gomperts and Aid Access in providing constitutionally protected abortion access.

In November 2019, the FDA filed a motion to dismiss the suit that was followed in December 2019 by a response letter from Aid Access to the FDA. The presiding judge accepted the FDA's position that this case was about a person's right to any unapproved drug and not about a woman's right to an abortion, and, because the FDA had not taken any subsequent action following its letter, dismissed the lawsuit.

=== FDA permanent legal approval ===
In 2020, the FDA temporarily suspended its ban on online consultations in response to the COVID-19 pandemic. In 2021, the FDA made it permanently legal for abortion pills to be sold following an online consultation.

=== 2025 Texas lawsuit ===
A Texas woman who claims her ex-lover spiked her drink with 10 misoprostol pills (causing her to have an abortion) is suing him in federal court. She named Aid Access (where she claims her ex-lover obtained the pills), and its founder Rebecca Gomperts as additional defendants. The local district attorney's office investigated the criminal allegations and stated that: "elements of a crime could not be established, and the investigation was subsequently closed as unfounded."

== Studies ==
Data from Aid Access has been used in several studies because they had been the sole online abortion telemedicine service in the United States until April 2021, when the FDA (due to COVID-19) temporarily legalized delivery of medication abortion by telemedicine and mail (the FDA in December 2021 made it permanently legal).

A study of the reasons given for requesting a self-managed abortion by the 57,506 individuals who requested this service between March 20, 2018, and March 20, 2020, found the reasons for requests to be: lower cost compared to a clinic (74%), privacy (49%), distance to a clinic (40%), and difficulty getting time off work or school (38%). Some also stated a preference for an at home, self managed abortion with 28% saying they would be more comfortable, and 27% saying it would be more convenient.

Another study that included the 49,935 requests made through the online consultation form between January 1, 2019, and April 11, 2020, found that during the 2020 COVID-19 lockdowns and restrictions (March 20, 2020, to April 11, 2020), average daily requests increased 27% compared to the preceding 14 months.

In a third study covering the period between October 1, 2020, and December 31, 2021, Aid Access received 45,908 requests from across all 50 USA states. In the first week of September 2021, after Texas Senate Bill 8 went into effect, the mean daily requests from Texas spiked by 1200%, (from 11 to 140) gradually decreasing over the next three months to 30 per day (175% higher than the pre-Senate Bill 8 level).

== Services provided ==
Aid Access offers mifepristone in combination with misoprostol for medical abortion. Their abortion pill service is available to people in all 50 U.S. states. U.S.-based doctors work with Aid Access to provide pills from a licensed pharmacy in the U.S. in 1–5 days. An online consultation process is required, which includes questions to assess for the medical eligibility and safety of providing medical abortion by mail.

Following the passage of Senate Bill 8 by the state of Texas, Aid Access began providing "advanced provision" pills to individuals seeking access to abortion. The practice of advanced provision involves providing abortion pills to individuals before they are pregnant, so that they may have them readily available for use should they need them in the future.

Gomperts has expressed her hope that this approach will become more widely adopted by U.S. doctors. She believes that a way around the restrictive abortion laws is for all doctors to prescribe a set of abortion pills for a woman on her first menstruation, so that she will always have them if needed.

== Safety ==
Self-induced abortion with mifepristone and misoprostol can be performed safely, according to the World Health Organization (WHO). The WHO recommends that determination of eligibility for medical abortion is made by a health provider, but self-administering the medications at home and self-assessing the completion of the abortion are recommended in specific circumstances. This aligns with the care provided by Aid Access.

If someone needs care after a self-administered medication abortion, Aid Access advises that they should say they had a miscarriage since the symptoms and treatment are exactly the same, and that no traces of the abortion pills remain if taken orally; though traces of the pills can last as long as 4 days if administered vaginally.
