= Rich Hill (film) =

- Sundance film poster
- Directed by: Tracy Droz Tragos; Andrew Droz Palermo
- Produced by: Tracy Droz Tragos; Andrew Droz Palermo; David Armillei
- Cinematography: Andrew Droz Palermo
- Edited by: Jim Hession
- Music by: Nathan Halpern
- Production company: Dinky Pictures
- Distributed by: The Orchard; Independent Lens
- Release dates: January 19, 2014 (Sundance); August 1, 2014 (United States)
- Running time: 93 minutes
- Country: United States
- Language: English

Rich Hill is a 2014 American documentary film co-produced and directed by Andrew Droz Palermo and Tracy Droz Tragos about Rich Hill, Missouri. The film premiered at the 2014 Sundance Film Festival, where it won the U.S. Grand Jury Prize for a documentary.

After its premiere at the Sundance Film Festival, The Orchard and Independent Lens acquired distribution rights to the film. Independent Lens broadcast the film nationally on PBS, while The Orchard distributed the film in the U.S. and Canada outside of linear broadcast. The film was released on August 1, 2014, in the United States.

== Synopsis ==
The film chronicles challenges, hopes, and dreams of three young residents — Andrew, Harley, and Appachey — of a rural American town.

Andrew's father has moved the family multiple times and his mother may suffer from agoraphobia. Harley lives with his grandmother in a trailer because his mother is in prison. Appachey was abandoned by his father at age 6 and lives with his mother and siblings. He chooses not to take medication for a number of conditions, including bipolar disorder, ADD, OCD, and ODD.

== Reception ==
The film received positive response from critics. Review aggregator Rotten Tomatoes reports that 84% of 45 film critics have given the film a positive review, with a rating average of 8 out of 10. The site's summary states: "As compassionate as it is infuriating, Rich Hill offers a sobering glimpse of American poverty." On Metacritic, which assigns a weighted mean rating out of 100 reviews from film critics, the film holds an average score of '75', based on 20 reviews, indicating a 'Generally Favorable' response.

Peter Debruge in his review for Variety called it "An open-hearted portrait of impoverished American life." Duane Byrge of The Hollywood Reporter gave the film a positive review and called it "A hard-eyed but empathetic glimpse into the hardscrabble lives of struggling Missouri folk." Katie Walsh of Indiewire said: "A truly moving and edifying film, Rich Hill is the type of media object that could and should be put in a time capsule for future generations." Dan Schindel in his review for Movie Mezzanine said "[it is] A wonderful look at pubescent melancholy and rural living."

=== Accolades ===
Year	Award	Category	Recipient	Result
2014	Sundance Film Festival	U.S. Grand Jury Prize: Documentary	Tracy Droz Tragos and Andrew Droz Palermo	Won
2014	Sarasota Film Festival	Documentary Directing: Special Jury Prize	Tracy Droz Tragos and Andrew Droz Palermo	Won
2014	Kansas City FilmFest	Best Heartland Feature Documentary	Tracy Droz Tragos and Andrew Droz Palermo	Won

Awards
Preceded by Blood Brother	Sundance Grand Jury Prize: U.S. Documentary; 2014	Succeeded by The Wolfpack
