= Women on Web =

Canadian online abortion help service

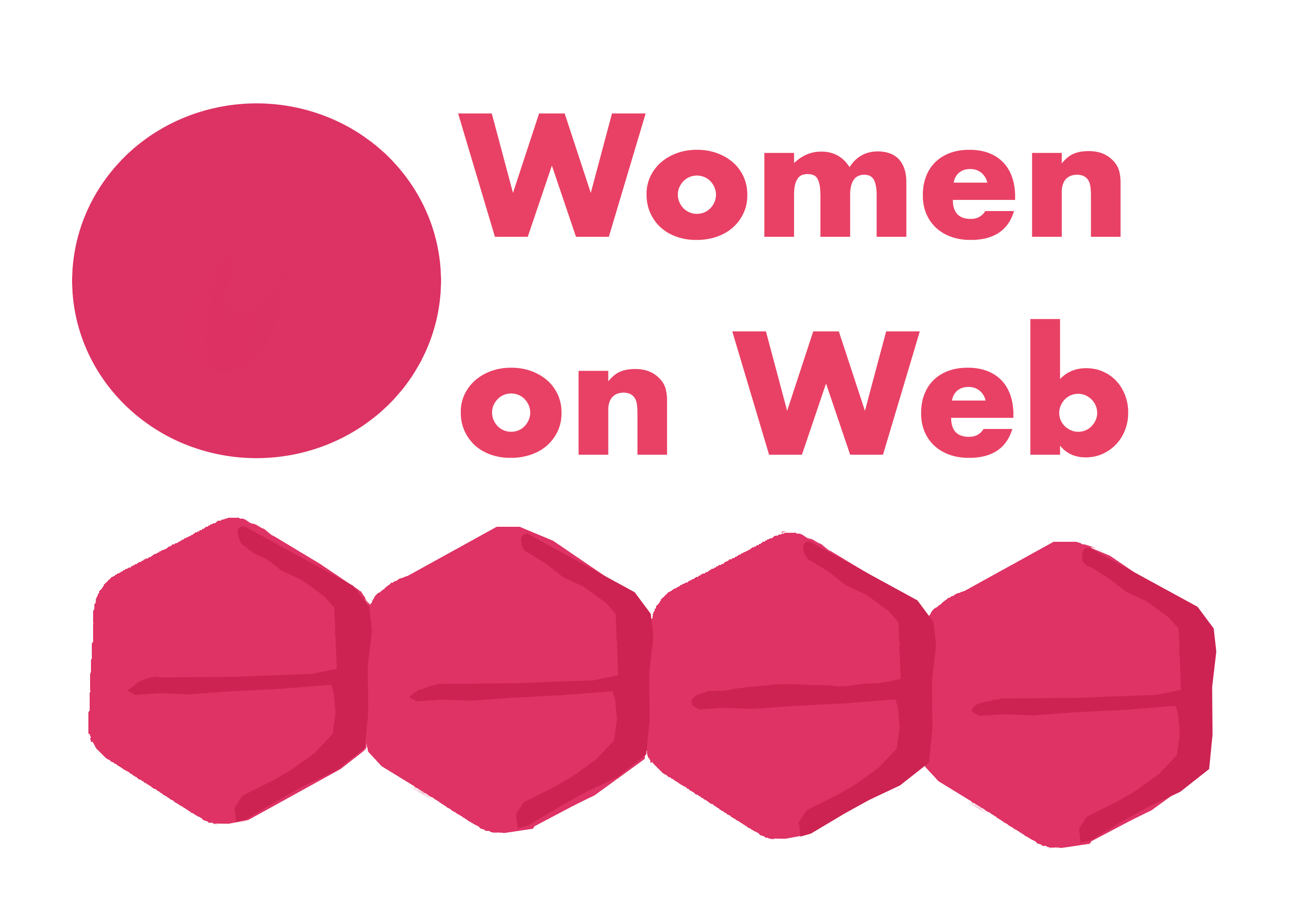
- Formation: November 10, 2005; 20 years ago
- Founder: Rebecca Gomperts
- Type: Non-profit organization
- Headquarters: Toronto, Canada
- Region served: Worldwide
- Services: Access to safe abortion services
- Leader: Venny Ala-Siurua
- Website: www.womenonweb.org

Women on Web (WoW) is a Canadian non-profit organization that facilitates online access to medical abortion, known for its international online abortion service accessible in multiple countries. The organization was founded by Dr. Rebecca Gomperts, a Dutch physician, in 2005.

The Women on Web helpdesk provides information and support in 16 languages, including Arabic, English, French, German, Japanese, Korean, Hungarian, Indonesian, Italian, Persian, Polish, Portuguese, Spanish Thai. Their medical team provides online medical consultations and facilitates the delivery of abortion pills by mail.

Self-managed medical abortion is done with mifepristone and misoprostol at home during the first 12 weeks of pregnancy. Mifepristone and misoprostol terminate the pregnancy by inducing an abortion that resembles a miscarriage with a 97% efficacy rate during the first 60 days of pregnancy. A 2008 study published in the British Journal of Obstetrics and Gynaecology found that women are capable of self‐administering mifepristone and misoprostol at home without a doctor physically visiting them, provided proper information and instructions are given.

== Online abortion service ==
Women on Web has supported over 130,000 people to access safe abortion with pills. People can request the abortion pills via their website by filling out an online consultation. After the medical team has reviewed the consultation, their multi-lingual help desk will contact the person to inform about the next steps. Typically the abortion pills are shipped in 24-48 hours after the consultation has been submitted. The delivery of pills may take 1-3 weeks but in the US the delivery is 2-5 days.

Since February 2022 Women on Web has provided abortion pills in advance of unwanted pregnancies: "With the help of this new service, women can request abortion pills in advance and take them as soon as they discover they are pregnant. Women on Web's medical team will prescribe the abortion pills to people who are not yet pregnant but who anticipate that they may need them in the future".

== Research ==
Several scientific studies on the outcome of abortions and the experiences of women who have used the Women on Web service have proven that abortion via telemedicine is safe, highly effective and acceptable to women. This has been confirmed by the World Health Organization which has recognized that abortions done with the help of Women on Web are considered safe.

Women on Web has also researched data from women in countries where abortion is not legally restricted to highlight the barriers in access to safe abortion services. Research from countries such as the UK, the Netherlands, Hungary and the USA has shown that women face obstacles to access abortion services when these services are only available in clinics or hospitals.

== Censorship ==
Women on Web’s websites are censored in several countries, but there are ways to access their online consultation for abortions even if the main website is unavailable. Women on Web maintains several local language websites to circumvent online censorship and expand access to their service. In response to growing digital threads in 2026 they launchend a portal called The A-Line in partnership with eQualitie. The goal is to help reproductive justice organizations navigate website blocking, cyberattacks, and the suppression of abortion-related content on search engines and social media platforms.

== See also ==
- Women on Waves
- Aid Access
