= Abortion shield laws in the United States =

Laws to protect doctors providing abortion

Abortion shield laws in the United States are being enacted in states where abortion is legal, to protect health care providers who provide abortion services for patients in states where abortion is banned or restricted. This means that patients living in states with abortion bans or restrictions are able to buy abortion pills in their own state from "shield law providers" online. Many states have passed laws to also protect telehealth actions when the provider prescribes abortion pills to a patient who is in an antiabortion state. Similar protections have also been extended to patients and providers of Gender-affirming hormone therapy.

These shield laws have been enacted after the United States Supreme Court overturned Roe v. Wade with Dobbs in June 2022.

== States with abortion shield laws ==
As of October 2026, abortion shield laws are on the books in DC and 19 states:

- California
- Colorado
- Connecticut
- Delaware
- Hawaii
- Illinois
- Maine
- Maryland
- Massachusetts
- Minnesota
- Nevada
- New Jersey
- New Mexico
- New York
- Oregon
- Rhode Island
- Vermont
- Virginia
- Washington

=== California ===
==== 2022 ====
On September 27, 2022, California Assembly Bill 1242 was passed. This assembly bill aimed to further strengthen abortion protections, and protect women from other state who have abortions in California by amending the penal code. These amendments would also prevent law enforcement from giving information regarding a legal abortion that takes place within the state of California. AB 1242 also sets bail at $0 for those that are arrested in connection to a lawful abortion that takes place within California.

==== 2023 ====
California has passed a package of 12 bills (which amended several existing statutes) including:

- AB 254 by Assemblymember Rebecca Bauer-Kahan (D-Orinda) – Confidentiality of Medical Information Act: reproductive or sexual health application information.
  - amends the CMIA to prohibit certain health care providers, pharmaceutical companies, California health care service plans and other entities from disclosing “medical information” in their possession regarding a patient, enrollee or subscriber without the individual’s prior authorization unless an exception applies, and as well as create, maintain, store or destroy medical information in a manner that preserves its confidentiality.
- AB 352 by Assemblymember Rebecca Bauer-Kahan (D-Orinda) – Health information:
  - amends the California Confidentiality of Medical Information Act (CMIA) to require electronic health record developers to enable privacy protections for, and segregate gender affirming care, abortion, abortion-related services and contraception from the rest of, a patient’s medical record.
- AB 571 by Assemblymember Cottie Petrie-Norris (D–Laguna Beach) – Medical malpractice insurance.
- AB 1646 by Assemblymember Stephanie Nguyen (D–Elk Grove) – Physicians and surgeons: postgraduate training: guest rotations.
- AB 1707 by Assemblymember Blanca Pacheco (D–Downey) – Health professionals and facilities: adverse actions based on another state’s law.
- AB 1720 by Assemblymember Rebecca Bauer-Kahan (D–Orinda) – Clinics: prenatal screening.
- SB 345 by Senator Nancy Skinner (D-Berkeley) – Health care services: legally protected health care activities.
  - prohibits employees, contractors, and agents from cooperating, providing information, or expending resources in furtherance of an investigation of an individual for “legally protected health care activity”, including abortion, and prohibits any California Healing Arts Board from taking disciplinary action or denying an application based on the provision of the protected care under SB 345.
- SB 487 by Senator Toni Atkins (D-San Diego) – Abortion: provider protections.

==== 2025 ====
On September 26, 2025, the following bills were signed:

- AB 260, which allows health care providers the option to prescribe abortion care medication to patients anonymously
- AB 1525, which shields attorneys assisting other states with access to reproductive care from State Bar discipline.
- AB 45, which prohibits the collection, use, disclosure, sale, sharing, or retention of personal information of a natural person located at or with the precise geolocation of a family planning center.

=== Maine ===
Maine has some of the least restrictive abortion laws in the country, and its shield law includes protections for abortion, fertility treatments and contraception.

=== Massachusetts ===
The abortion shield law in Massachusetts protects telehealth abortion providers and gender-affirming care providers from out-of-state prosecution by categorizing all virtual encounters with patients in anti-abortion states as local.

=== New York ===
In 2025, a New York court blocked Texas Attorney General Ken Paxton from enforcing a legal punishment against a New York doctor for prescribing mifepristone via telehealth to a patient in Texas.

== History ==
In 2023 a paper was published in the Columbia Law Review about ways in which shield laws could both expand access to abortion for patients living in states with abortion restrictions or bans, and protect medical practitioners providing abortion who treated patients in US states that prohibited abortion. Following publication of the paper, several states passed shield laws for medical practitioners. As of July 2023 fifteen states had such shield laws, and five had telemedicine provisions, specifically protecting a provider who prescribed and mailed abortion pills to a patient in a state where abortion was banned. From 18 June 2023 Aid Access mailed medication to patients throughout the US with providers licensed in the five states with telemedicine provisions, with no need to ship from other countries as had been necessary before. It was expected that legal battles would follow as the shield laws were tested in court. Patients themselves were not explicitly protected by the shield laws, though it does have the effect of improving access to abortion for patients living in states with abortion bans.

Starting in 2023, several states passed abortion shield laws. Thereafter, practitioners in those states started to use the telehealth process, and prescribed the abortion pill which was mailed to the patient from out-of-state.

Before the landmark Dobbs v. Jackson Women's Health Organization, telehealth accounted for 4% of abortions in the US, and after Dobbs, the percentage increased to 16%. By December 2023, telehealth accounted for 19% of all abortions in the US. Telehealth accounted for 24% of all clinician-provided abortions in 2025.

From October through December 2023, nearly 8,000 people per month in anti-abortion states were getting abortion medication from clinicians operating in states with shield laws. In 10 anti-abortion states, the number of women receiving abortions increased between 2020 and the end of 2023. Nationally, 1,126,000 women had abortions in 2025, virtually the same amount as in 2024.

In April 2024 a man in Texas invoked the Texas Heartbeat Act to bring legal action against his ex-partner and healthcare providers in Colorado for her abortion there.

In December 2024 Texas sued a New York doctor for allegedly prescribing abortion pills to a 20-year-old Dallas-area woman. The complaint tests the Texas abortion ban against a 2022 New York shield law.

== Legal issues ==
Shield laws, in general, have complicated legal issues surrounding them, primarily because they deal with interstate relations. There has also been scholarly discussion as whether abortion shield laws—particularly those prohibiting the enforcement of judgments or injunctions (provisions designed to hobble the Texas Heartbeat Act and its progeny) arising from laws limiting abortion access—would withstand constitutional challenges claiming such laws are in violation of the Full Faith and Credit Clause. The following is the text of Article IV, Section, Clause 1, commonly known as the Full Faith and Credit Clause:

Full Faith and Credit shall be given in each State to the public Acts, Records, and judicial Proceedings of every other State. And the Congress may by general Laws prescribe the Manner in which such Acts, Records and Proceedings shall be proved, and the Effect thereof.

Another source of potential constitutional uncertainty may arise from the Extradition Clause. The text of the Extradition Clause is found in Article IV, Section 2, Clause 2:

A Person charged in any State with Treason, Felony, or other Crime, who shall flee from Justice, and be found in another State, shall on Demand of the executive Authority of the State from which he fled, be delivered up, to be removed to the State having Jurisdiction of the Crime.

Shield law provisions may deny extradition of people who were not in the other state when they allegedly committed the crime. Some abortion shield laws are broad, and apply to all conduct (not just abortion) that is not punishable in the shielding state. Other states have protection that is specific to reproductive health care.

Standard telehealth practice and policy is to consider medical care to have occurred where the patient is located. This means a state with an abortion ban would consider a medical care provider to have broken that state's laws if that provider used telehealth to provide abortion care to a patient located in a state that bans abortion. However, Massachusetts' shield law applies "regardless of the patient's location." This might mean that a Massachusetts provider, licensed and located in Massachusetts, can take advantage of the protections of the state's shield law no matter where the patient receives the care. Currently a one-of-a-kind provision, this provision poses several open questions regarding how it would work in practice.

== Executive orders ==
Executive orders are issued by governors, and are an alternative to legislation. However, executive orders only apply to administrative acts and procedures under the umbrella of the executive branch, and so they are not as powerful as laws passed by legislatures. As of Feb 2024, governors have issued executive orders in 12 states: California, Colorado, Maine, Massachusetts, Michigan, Minnesota, Nevada, New Mexico, North Carolina, Pennsylvania, Rhode Island, and Washington. These executive orders address topics such as license discipline, extradition, and executive agency cooperation.

== See also ==
- Abortion law
- Abortion law in the United States by state
- Soft secession
- Abortion and the Catholic Church in the United States
- Anti-abortion violence in the United States
- Feminism in the United States
- Heartbeat bill
- Religion and abortion
- Reproductive rights
- Types of abortion restrictions in the United States
- War on women
