= The Smartest Kids in the World (book) =

Book by Amanda Ripley

The Smartest Kids in the World: And How They Got That Way
- Author: Amanda Ripley
- Language: English
- Published: 13 August 2013
- ISBN: 9781451654424

The Smartest Kids in the World: And How They Got That Way is a book that analyses and compares various national education systems to the American education system, often in critique. Ripley follows three American students as they study abroad for one year of high school. Kim, a fifteen-year-old from Oklahoma, studies in Finland. Eric, an eighteen-year-old from Minnesota, studies in South Korea. Tom, and eighteen-year-old from Pennsylvania, studies in Poland.
