= Self-induced abortion =

Abortion performed by a pregnant person themselves

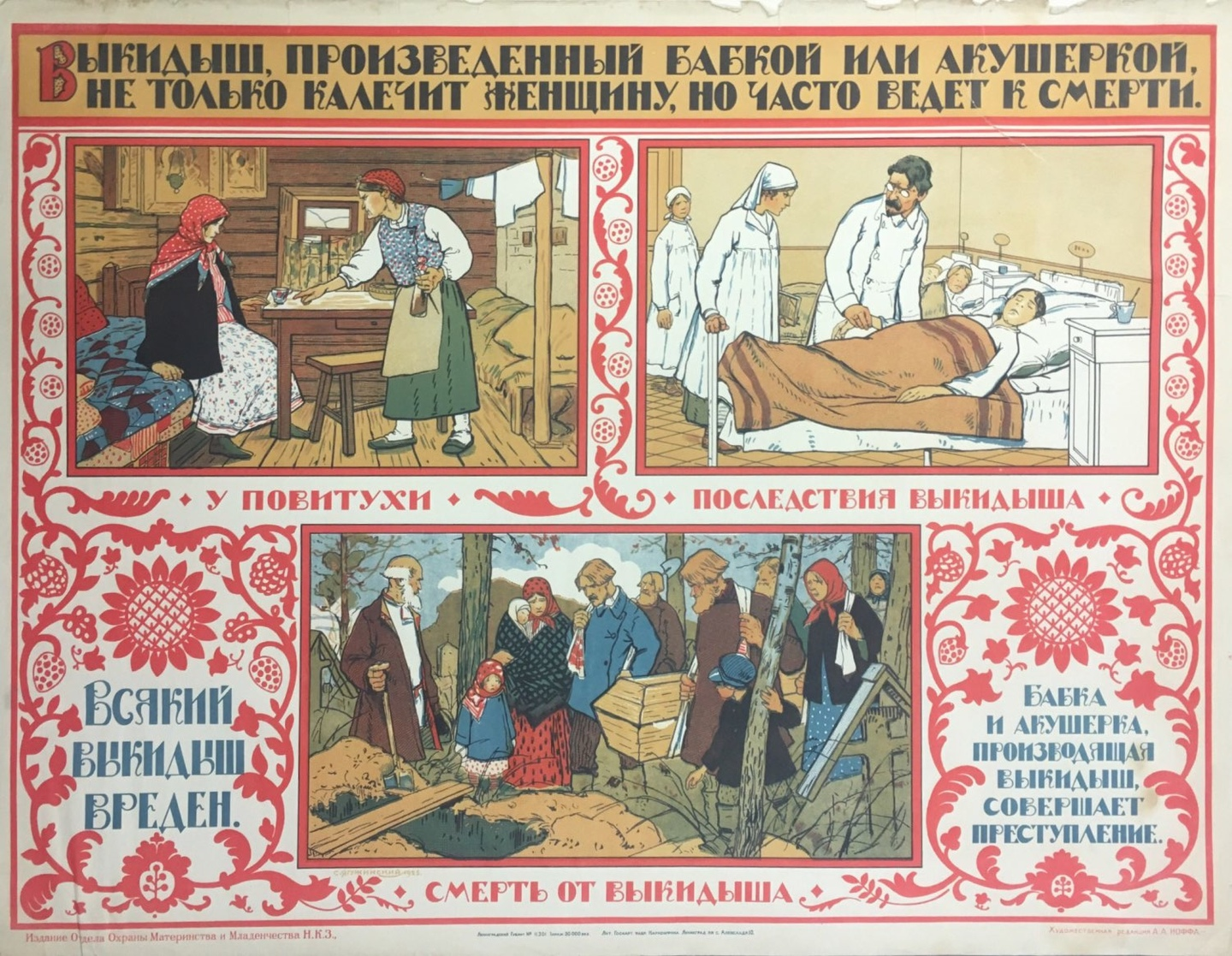
Soviet poster circa 1925. Title translation: "Abortions induced by either self-taught midwives or obstetricians not only maim the woman, they also often lead to death"

A self-induced abortion (also called a self-managed abortion, or sometimes a self-induced miscarriage) is an abortion performed by the pregnant woman herself, or with the help of other, non-medical assistance. Although the term includes abortions induced outside of a clinical setting with legal, sometimes over-the-counter medication, it also refers to efforts to terminate a pregnancy through alternative, potentially more dangerous methods. Such practices may present a threat to the health of women in the case that they are incorrectly used.

Self-induced (or self-managed) abortion is often attempted during the beginning of pregnancy (the first eight weeks from the last menstrual period). In recent years, significant reductions in maternal death and injury resulting from self-induced abortions have been attributed to the increasing availability of misoprostol (known commercially as "Cytotec"). This medication is a synthetic prostaglandin E1 that is inexpensive, widely available, and has multiple uses, including the treatment of post-partum hemorrhage, stomach ulcers, cervical preparation and induction of labor. The World Health Organization (WHO) has endorsed two regimens for abortion up to 12 weeks of pregnancy using misoprostol: a standardized regimen of mifepristone and misoprostol and a regimen of misoprostol alone. The regimen with misoprostol alone has been shown to be up to 83% effective in terminating a pregnancy but is more effective combined with mifepristone.

== Methods attempted ==
Women can use many different methods to self-manage (or self-induce) an abortion. Some are safe and effective, while others are dangerous to the health of the woman and/or ineffective at terminating a pregnancy.

=== Mifepristone and/or misoprostol ===
The only scientifically studied effective self-induced abortion method is ingesting a combination of mifepristone and misoprostol or misoprostol alone. The combination of these medications is on the World Health Organization's List of Essential Medicines. In some countries, these pills may be available over-the-counter in pharmacies, although some pharmacies do not provide accurate instructions on use. In Latin America, women have reported self-inducing abortions with misoprostol alone since the 1980s. The history of women self-managing abortion with pills includes projects such as the Socorristas in Argentina and Las Libres in Mexico. Other countries have "safe abortion hotlines", which facilitate access to pills, provide instructions on proper use of the pills, and provide emotional, logistical, and/or financial support. Some women use online abortion pill help services such as Women on Web and Aid Access to order mifepristone and/or misoprostol, with reported effectiveness and safety in pregnancy termination and satisfaction in the service. Instructions on abortion pill use are widely available on the websites of the World Health Organization (WHO), Gynuity Health Projects, and the International Women's Health Coalition.

First trimester medical abortion is highly safe and effective. The side effects of medication abortion include uterine cramping and prolonged bleeding, and common side effects include nausea, vomiting and diarrhea. The majority of women who use abortion pills on their own do not need an ultrasound or a clinician, although one may be recommended to ensure that the pregnancy is not ectopic. In the rare case of a complication, a woman can access a clinician skilled in miscarriage management.

Studies confirm a correlation between the increase in the self-administration of medical abortion with misoprostol, and a reduction in maternal morbidity and mortality. Some studies argue that unfettered access to medication abortion is a key tenet of public health, human rights, and reproductive rights.

=== Physical trauma, herbs, and other substances ===
Self-induced abortion methods vary around the world. The most commonly recorded are ingestion of plants or herbs, ingesting toxic substances, causing trauma to the uterus, causing physical trauma to the body, using alcohol and drugs in an attempt to end the pregnancy, and ingesting other substances and mixtures. These methods vary from simply being ineffective to creating bodily harm to the pregnant woman.

Self-induced abortion involving physical trauma to cause an abortion is never considered safe. These methods may include direct trauma to the abdomen or uterus, insertion of objects into the cervix, or self-inflicted injury. Causing physical trauma to a woman's body or uterus may also result in physical harm or even death to the woman instead of causing an abortion. Such actions can lead to long-term reproductive damage, or even death. Rather than inducing abortion, these attempts frequently lead to emergency medical situations and represent a significant public health concern in regions lacking access to safe reproductive care.

A descriptive study of women seeking to induce abortion in Cape Town, South Africa found that the women used abortifacients from three major sources: traditional healers, illegal abortion providers, and home remedies prepared using over-the-counter ingredients. The abortifacients included assorted pills (some that were likely misoprostol, others included antiviral drugs, hypertension medication, and izifozonke), herbal blends of unclear origin, commercial herbal blends (including Stametta), "Dutch remedies" (including Vornokroy, Helmin drops, and potassium permanganate), abrasive substances, alcohol, bleach, ammonia, other household cleaners, and laxatives.

== Rates ==
As of 2025, an estimated 73 million abortions occur worldwide each year, of which 45% are considered by the WHO to be less or least safe. Induced abortion is considered safe when WHO recommended methods are used by trained persons, less safe when only one of those two criteria is met, and least safe when neither is met. Self-induced abortions can be safe or unsafe depending on the methods used.

It is difficult to measure the prevalence or rate of self-induced abortions. As of 2018, in the United States, the estimate was that one in 10 abortions is self-induced. While maternal morbidity and mortality from unsafe abortion has continued to increase due to population growth, in Latin America, from 2005 to 2012, there was a 31% decrease in the number of complications from unsafe abortion, from 7.7/1,000 to 5.3/1,000. Researchers believe that this may be due to the wide availability of misoprostol in Latin America.

In late 2019, it was reported that rates of self-induced abortion in the United States were rising, partly due to fears that more conservative policies would limit access to clinical abortion, and partly due to the increased availability and convenience of telehealth medical supervision and prescriptions and mail-order drugs. Between December 2021/January 2022 and June/July 2023, before and after the May 2022 overturing of Roe v. Wade in Dobbs v. Jackson Women's Health Organization, reported rates of self-managed abortions in the US rose from 2.4% to 3.3%, adjusted for underreporting to 10.1%.

Rates of self-induced abortion are higher among those who experience greater barriers to abortive care, "including people of color, people with lower incomes, and people who live in states that have restrictive abortion laws." Rates were found to have been particularly higher among non-Hispanic Black people vs people of other racial and ethnic groups, as well as higher among sexual and gender minorities vs heterosexual or cisgender people. One study found that 19% of transgender, nonbinary, and gender-expansive people who have ever been pregnant have attempted self-managed abortion.

== History ==
The practice of attempted self-induced abortion has long been recorded in the United States. Turn-of-the-20th-century birth control advocate and founder of Planned Parenthood Margaret Sanger wrote in her autobiography of a 1912 incident in which she was summoned to treat a woman who had nearly died from such an attempt.

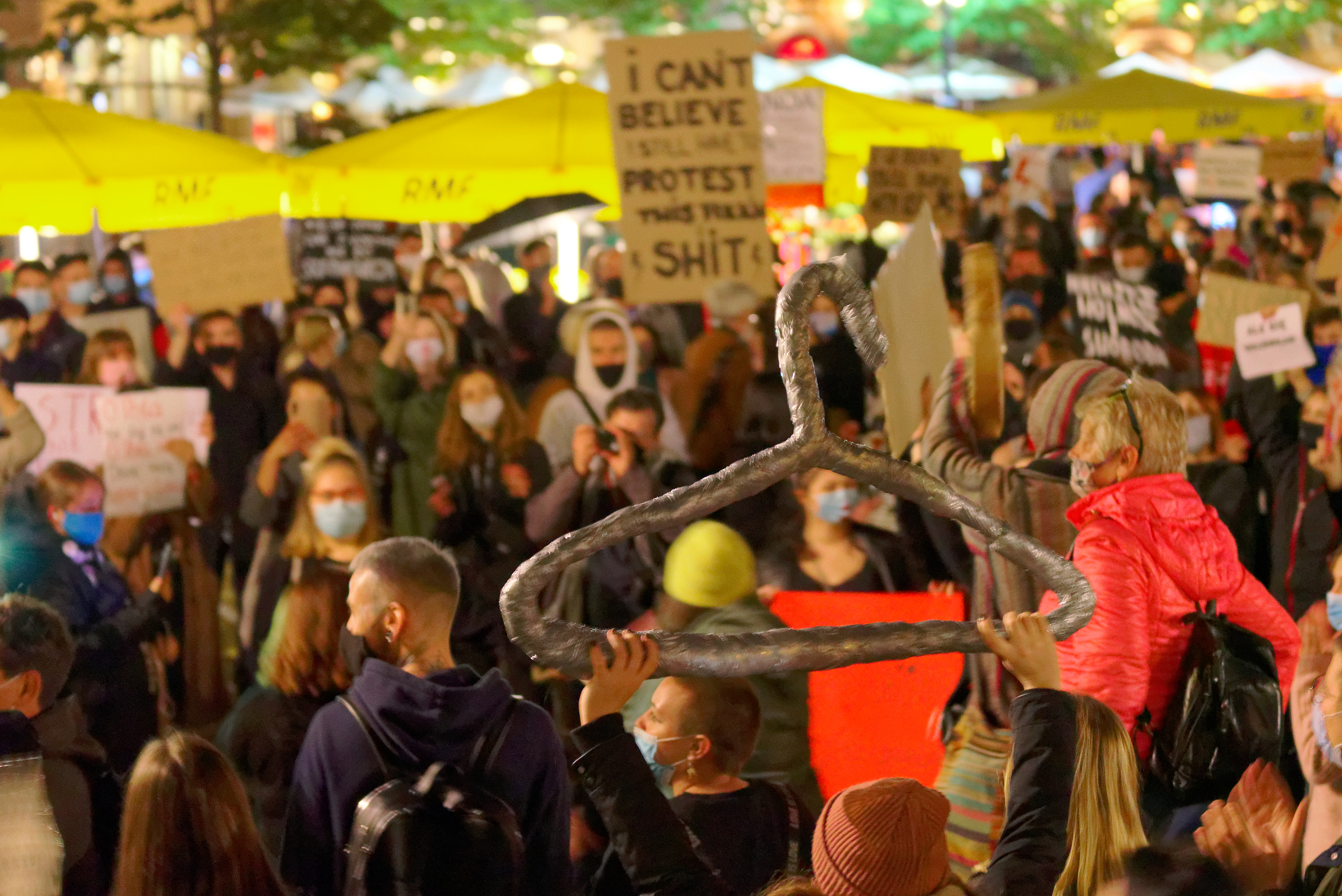
A symbolic coat hanger on a protest against abortion restriction in Kraków, Poland

In a letter to The New York Times, gynecologist Waldo L. Fielding wrote:

The familiar symbol of illegal abortion is the infamous "coat hanger" — which may be the symbol, but is in no way a myth. In my years in New York, several women arrived with a hanger still in place. Whoever put it in – perhaps the patient herself – found it trapped in the cervix and could not remove it...However, not simply coat hangers were used. Almost any implement you can imagine had been and was used to start an abortion – darning needles, crochet hooks, cut-glass salt shakers, soda bottles, sometimes intact, sometimes with the top broken off.

Charles Jewett wrote The Practice of Obstetrics in 1901. In it, he stated, "Oil of tansy and oil of rue are much relied on by the laity for the production of abortion, and almost every day one may read of fatal results attending their use. Oil of tansy in large doses is said to excite epileptiform convulsions; quite recently one of my colleagues met such a case in his practice."

In the 1994 documentary Motherless: A Legacy of Loss from Illegal Abortion, Louis Gerstley, M.D., said that, in addition to knitting needles, some women would use the spokes of bicycle wheels or umbrellas. "Anything that was metal and long and thin would be used," he stated. He stated that a common complication from such a procedure was that the object would puncture through the uterus and injure the intestines, leading to subsequent death from peritonitis and infection. Later in the film, he mentioned that potassium permanganate tablets were sometimes used. The tablets were inserted into the vagina where they caused a chemical burn so intense that a hole may be left in the tissue. He claimed the tablets left the surrounding tissue in such a state that doctors trying to stitch up the wound couldn't do so because "the tissue was like trying to suture butter." Dr. Mildred Hanson also described the use of potassium permanganate tablets in the 2003 documentary Voices of Choice: Physicians Who Provided Abortions Before Roe v. Wade. She said, "the women would bleed like crazy because it would just eat big holes in the vagina."

Dr. David Reuben mentions that many African women use a carved wooden "abortion stick" to induce, which has often been handed down.

A study concluded in 1968 determined that over 500,000 illegal abortions were performed every year in the United States, a portion of which were performed by women acting alone. The study suggested that the number of women dying as a result of self-induced abortions exceeded those resulting from abortions performed by another person. A 1979 study noted that many women who required hospitalization following self-induced abortion attempts were admitted under the pretext of having had a miscarriage or spontaneous abortion.

WHO estimates that approximately 25 million abortions continue to be performed unsafely each year both clinically and self-induced. Around 7 million women are admitted to hospitals every year in developing countries and between 4.7% – 13.2% of all pregnancy-related deaths can be attributed to unsafe abortion. Almost every one of these deaths and disabilities could have been prevented through sexual education, family planning, and the provision of safe abortion services. Abortion pills, which were first used by Brazilian women in the 1980s, can prevent many of these deaths from unsafe abortion.

== Law ==
=== Iran ===
While positions regarding abortion in Islam is one open to varied interpretation by Muslim scholars, in Iran, self-induced abortion, as with other forms of abortion in general, is considered to be a haram act, in accordance a declaration by Ayatollah Khomeini that all forms of abortion are forbidden, mirroring a common position held under Shi'ite interpretation of Sharia law. As a result, a diyya of approximately 1000 dinar is issued for the abortion of male fetuses and half of that amount for female ones, though the diyya is lowered to 60 dinar, the parent must pay the diyya to child's kin.

=== United States ===
In the United States, experts report that self-induced abortion can be medically safe but legally risky. The 1973 Supreme Court decision Roe v. Wade, which was overturned in the 2022 case Dobbs v. Jackson Women's Health Organization, made abortion more readily available throughout the U.S., yet women who have abortions with pills ordered online or through non-clinical means may face risk of arrest.

It is not common for women in the United States to be charged for the crime of self-inducing an abortion. However, a small number of people in the U.S. have been arrested for ending their own pregnancies with pills ordered online, including Purvi Patel, Jennie Linn McCormack, and Kenlissia Jones. These women were prosecuted under a variety of laws including laws directly criminalizing self-induced abortions, laws criminalizing harm to fetuses, criminal abortion laws misapplied to people who self-induce, and various laws deployed when no other legal authorization could be found. In 2022, Lizelle Herrera of Texas was charged with murder after the authorities alleged that she caused "the death of an individual by self-induced abortion". It was unclear whether she had an abortion herself or helped someone else with it. According to University of Texas law professor Stephen Vladeck, the state law exempts the mother from criminal homicide charges for aborting her own fetus. On 10 April 2022, the district attorney of Texas announced that the murder charges would be dismissed.

As of 2022, there are seven states with laws directly criminalizing self-induced abortion, 38 states with laws criminalizing harm to fetuses that lack adequate exemptions for the pregnant woman, and 15 states with criminal abortion laws that could be applied to women who self-induce an abortion. Both the National Lawyers Guild and the American Medical Association passed resolutions condemning the criminalization of self-induced abortion.

== See also ==
- Abortion debate
- Feminist Abortion Network
- Gerri Santoro
- Menstrual extraction
- Our Bodies, Ourselves
- Plan C
- Reproductive rights
- Unsafe abortion
