= Medical abortion =

Using drugs to bring about an abortion

Background
- Abortion type: Medical
- First use: United States 1979 (carboprost), West Germany 1981 (sulprostone), Japan 1984 (gemeprost), France 1988 (mifepristone), United States 1988 (misoprostol)
- Gestation: 3–24+ weeks

Usage
- Medical abortions as a percentage of all abortions
- France: 76% (2021)
- Sweden: 96% (2021)
- UK: Eng. & Wales: 87% (2021)
- UK: Scotland: 99% (2021)
- United States: 63% (2023)

Mifepristone/misoprostol
Combination of
- Mifepristone: Progesterone receptor modulator
- Misoprostol: Prostaglandin

Clinical data
- Trade names: Mifegymiso, others
- Routes of administration: Buccal, by mouth
- ATC code: G03XB51 (WHO)

Legal status
- Legal status: AU: S4 (Prescription only); CA: ℞-only; UK: POM (Prescription only); US: ℞-only Medications are approved separately; EU: Rx-only

A medical abortion, also known as medication abortion or non-surgical abortion, occurs when drugs (medication) are used to bring about an abortion. Medical abortions are an alternative to surgical (also called procedural or instrumentation) abortions such as vacuum aspiration or dilation and curettage. Medical abortions are more common than surgical abortions in most places around the world.

Medical abortions are most commonly performed by administering a two-drug combination: mifepristone followed by misoprostol. This two-drug combination is more effective than other drug combinations. When mifepristone is not available, misoprostol alone may be used in some situations.

Medical abortion is both safe and effective throughout a range of gestational ages, including the second and third trimester. It gets progressively riskier and less effective as the pregnancy advances, especially in the third trimester. In the United States, the mortality rate for medical abortion is 14 times lower than the mortality rate for childbirth, and the rate of serious complications requiring hospitalization or blood transfusion is less than 0.4%. Medical abortion can be administered safely by the patient at home, without assistance, in the first trimester. However, access to at home use varies by country and jurisdiction depending on legal, regulatory, and medical guidelines. In the second trimester and beyond, it is recommended to take the second drug in a clinic, provider's office, or other supervised medical facility.

== Drug regimens ==
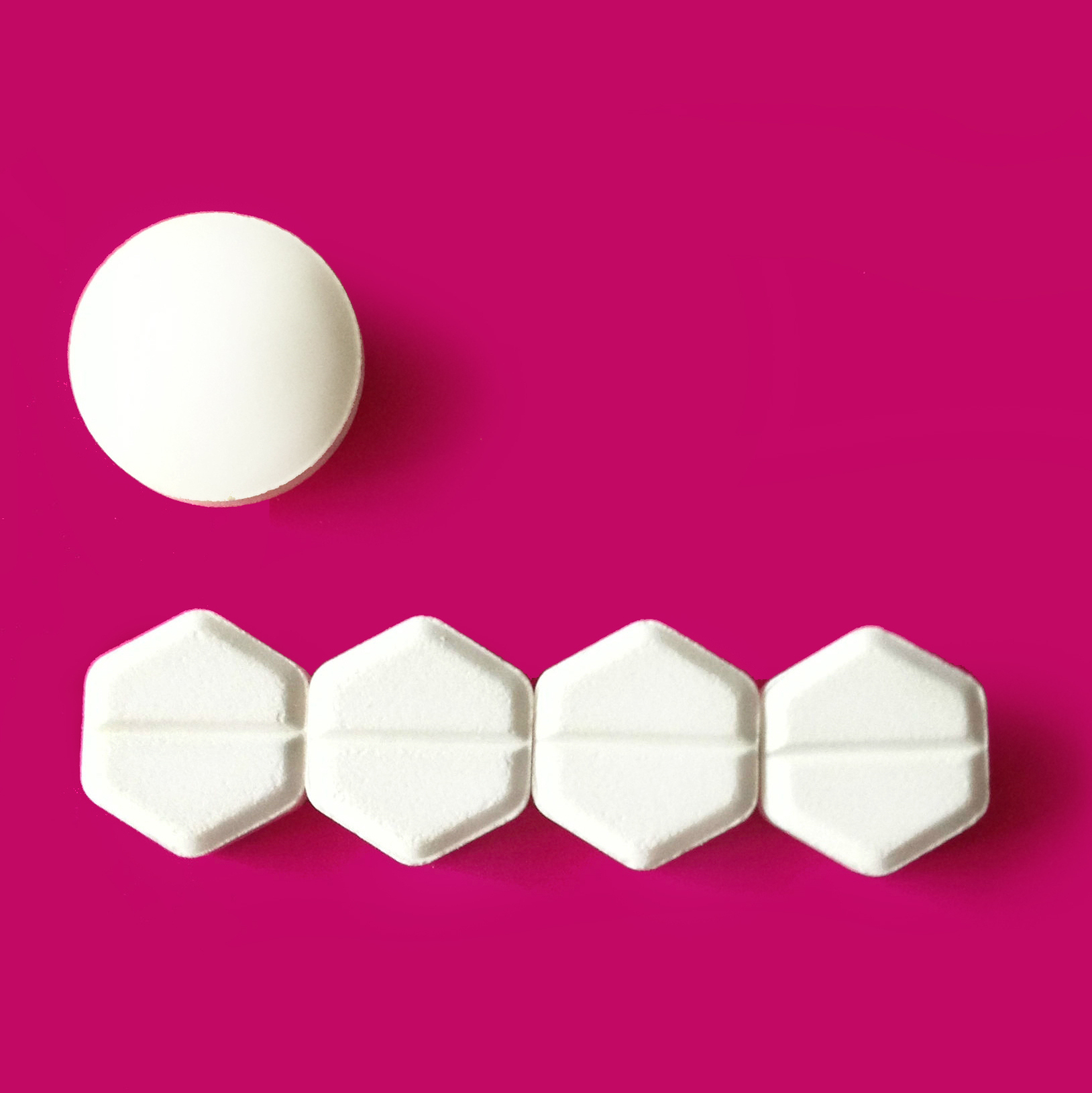
200 mg mifepristone and 800 μg misoprostol, the typical regimen for early medical abortion

=== Less than 12 weeks' gestation ===
For medical abortion up to 12 weeks' gestation, the recommended drug dosages are 200 milligrams of mifepristone by mouth, followed one to two days later by 800 micrograms of misoprostol inside the cheek, vaginally, or under the tongue. The success rate of this drug combination is 96.6% through 10 weeks' pregnancy.

Medical abortion performed very early, before the pregnancy can be detected by ultrasound, is just as safe and effective as medical abortion after the pregnancy is detectable by ultrasound. Misoprostol should be administered 24 to 48 hours after the mifepristone; taking the misoprostol before 24 hours have elapsed reduces the probability of success. However, one study showed that the two drugs may be taken simultaneously with nearly the same efficacy.

For pregnancies after 9 weeks, two doses of misoprostol (the second drug) makes the treatment more effective. From 10 to 11 weeks of pregnancy, the National Abortion Federation suggests second dose of misoprostol (800 micrograms) four hours after the first dose. If the pregnancy involves twins, a higher dosage of mifepristone may be recommended.

After the patient takes mifepristone, they must also administer the misoprostol. While there is a chance for the pregnancy to successfully abort, failure to take the misoprostol may result in any of these outcomes: the fetus may be terminated, but not fully expelled from the uterus (possibly accompanied by hemorrhaging) and may require surgical intervention to remove the fetus; or the pregnancy may continue with a healthy fetus. For those reasons, misoprostol should always be taken after the mifepristone.

==== Self-administered medical abortion ====
In the first trimester, self-administered medical abortion is available for patients who prefer to take the abortion drugs at home without direct medical supervision (in contrast to provider-administered medical abortion where the patient takes the second abortion drug in the presence of a trained healthcare provider). Self-administered medical abortion during the first trimester is as safe and effective as provider-administered abortion.

The procedure used to administer the two drugs depends on specific drugs prescribed. A typical procedure, for 200 mg mifepristone tablets, is:

1. Take the 200 mg mifepristone tablet by mouth
2. Take the 800 μg misoprostol (typically four pills) between 24 hours and 48 hours after the mifepristone (instructions supplied with the misoprostol will specify how to take it, such as: buccally (between the gums and the inner lining of the mouth cheek), or under the tongue, or in the vagina by vaginal suppository)
3. The pregnancy (embryo and placenta) will be expelled through the vagina within 2 to 24 hours after taking misoprostol, so the patient should remain near toilet facilities at that time. Cramps, nausea and bleeding may be experienced while the pregnancy is being expelled, and afterwards
4. The patient should contact their provider 7 to 14 days after the administration of mifepristone to confirm that complete termination of pregnancy has occurred and to evaluate the degree of bleeding

=== After 12 weeks' gestation ===
Medical abortion is safe and effective in the second and third trimesters. The World Health Organization (WHO) recommends that medical abortions performed after 12 weeks' gestation be supervised by a generalist medical practitioner or specialist medical practitioner (in contrast to first trimester, where the patient may safely take the drugs at home without supervision).

For medical abortion after 12 weeks' gestation, the WHO recommends 200 mg of mifepristone by mouth followed one to two days later by repeat doses of 400 μg misoprostol under the tongue, inside the cheek, or in the vagina. Misoprostol should be taken every 3 hours until successful abortion is achieved, the mean time to abortion after starting misoprostol is 6–8 hours, and approximately 94% will abort within 24 hours after starting misoprostol. When mifepristone is not available, misoprostol may still be used though the mean time to abortion after starting misoprostol will be extended compared to regimens using mifepristone followed by misoprostol.

=== Alternative drug combinations ===
The mifepristone-misoprostol combination is, by far, the most recommended drug regimen for medical abortions, but other drug combinations are available.

Misoprostol alone, without mifepristone, may be used in some circumstances for medical abortion, and has even been demonstrated to be successful in the second trimester. Misoprostol is more commonly available than mifepristone, and is easier to store and administer, so misoprostol without mifepristone may be suggested by the provider if mifepristone is not available. If misoprostol is used without mifepristone, the WHO recommends 800 μg of misoprostol inside the cheek, under the tongue, or in the vagina. The success rate of misoprostol alone for terminating pregnancy (93%) is nearly the same as the mifepristone-misoprostol combination (96%). However, 15% of the women using misoprostol alone required a surgical follow-up procedure, which is significantly more than the mifepristone-misoprostol combination.

Tests have shown that letrozole or methotrexate may be included in the mifepristone-misoprostol regimen to improve the outcome in the first trimester.

A rarely used drug combination for uterine pregnancies is methotrexate-misoprostol, which is typically reserved for ectopic pregnancies. Methotrexate is given either orally or intramuscularly, followed by vaginal misoprostol 3–5 days later. The methotrexate combination is available through 63 days. The WHO authorizes the methotrexate-misoprostol combination but recommends the mifepristone combination because methotrexate may be teratogenic to the embryo in cases of incomplete abortion. The methotrexate-misoprostol combination is considered more effective than misoprostol alone.

== Contraindications ==
Contraindications to mifepristone are inherited porphyria, chronic adrenal failure, and ectopic pregnancy. Some consider an intrauterine device in place to be a contraindication as well. A previous allergic reaction to mifepristone or misoprostol is also a contraindication.

Many studies excluded women with severe medical problems such as heart and liver disease or severe anemia. Caution is required in a range of circumstances including:

- long-term corticosteroid use;
- bleeding disorder;
- severe anemia

In some cases, it may be appropriate to refer people with preexisting medical conditions to a hospital-based abortion provider.

Conversely, some medical conditions may make medication abortion more favorable than surgical abortion, such as large uterine fibroids, congenital uterine anomalies, or genital scarring related to infibulation.

== Adverse effects ==
Most women will have cramping and bleeding heavier than a menstrual period. Other adverse effects may include nausea, vomiting, fever, chills, diarrhea, headache, dizziness, warmth or hot flashes. When used inside the vagina, misoprostol tends to have fewer gastrointestinal side effects. Nonsteroidal anti-inflammatory medications such as ibuprofen reduce pain with medication abortion.

=== Symptoms that require immediate medical attention ===
- Heavy bleeding (if you bleed through two or more pads for two or more consecutive hours, seek medical attention)
- Abdominal pain, nausea, vomiting, diarrhea, fever for more than 24 hours after taking mifepristone
- Fever of 38 °C (100.4 °F) or higher for more than 4 hours

Complications under 10 weeks' pregnancy are rare; according to two large reviews, bleeding requiring a blood transfusion occurred in 0.03–0.6% of women and serious infection in 0.01–0.5%. Because infection is rare after medication abortion, preventative antibiotics are not recommended (in contrast to surgical abortions, where antibiotics are routinely provided). A few rare cases of deaths from clostridial toxic shock syndrome have occurred following medical abortions.

A 2013 systematic review which included 45,000 women who used the 200 mg mifepristone followed by misoprostol combination found that less than 0.4% had serious complications requiring hospitalization (0.3%) and/or blood transfusion (0.1%).

=== Management of bleeding ===
Vaginal bleeding generally diminishes gradually over about two weeks after a medical abortion, but in individual cases spotting can last up to 45 days. Emergency surgical or medical interventions for prolonged bleeding may be considered based on how the patient feels and if the bleeding seems to be getting better. Overall, less than 1% of individuals who undergo a medical abortion must obtain emergency services for excessive bleeding, and about 0.1% require a blood transfusion. Remaining products of conception will be expelled during subsequent vaginal bleeding. Still, surgical intervention may be carried out on the woman's request, if the bleeding is heavy or prolonged, or causes anemia, or if there is evidence of endometritis.

=== Safety ===
Medical abortion is as safe as, or safer than, childbirth, surgical abortion, or unsafe ("back-alley") abortion.

Medical abortion is about 14 times safer than childbirth, and also safer than Penicillin and Viagra.

Medical abortion is as safe as, or safer than, surgical abortion. In the United States, an FDA report states that of the 3.7 million women who have had a medication abortion between 2000 and 2018, 24 died afterward, with 11 of those deaths likely unrelated to the abortion, including drug overdoses, homicides, and a suicide. When not taking the 11 likely unrelated deaths into account, the mortality rate for medication abortion is half the mortality rate of abortion overall. Including all deaths in the study, the data shows that the mortality rate for medication abortion is about equal to abortion overall.

Legal medical abortions reduce the risks associated with unsafe abortions. Globally, individuals who can get pregnant face substantial dangers to their health due to the significant challenges in obtaining safe abortion services. These negative outcomes arise from stringent abortion regulations, ineffective healthcare systems, a shortage of adequately trained healthcare professionals, societally imposed stigma, and limited services in remote regions. Additionally, within low and middle-income countries where abortion is legally allowed, a considerable number of unsafe abortions occur. Approximately 7 million women are hospitalized annually in these areas as a result of complications arising from unsafe abortion. Unsafe abortion is attributed to 4.7% to 13.2% of maternal deaths each year, with the estimated expense for managing its complications reaching $553 million. Many factors contribute to these health risks including lack of education about available choices, the varying stances of healthcare providers on abortion, a shortage of qualified personnel for safe abortion services, insufficient privacy and confidentiality, and services that fall short of meeting the demand.

=== Teratogenicity and ongoing pregnancy ===
Before taking medication for abortion, individuals should be advised about the potential harmful effects of misoprostol if the abortion is not successful. If the pregnancy continues after using mifepristone and misoprostol, it is advised to seek proper medical care to discuss pregnancy options, with a thorough discussion of the risks and benefits for each. There is no evidence of mifepristone causing birth defects, but misoprostol, when used in the first trimester, can be teratogenic and lead to congenital anomalies like limb defects, with or without Möbius' syndrome (facial paralysis).

== Pharmacology ==
Mifepristone blocks the hormone progesterone, causing the lining of the uterus to thin, preventing an embryo from latching on to the uterine wall to grow. Methotrexate, which is sometimes used instead of mifepristone, stops the cytotrophoblastic tissue from growing and becoming a functional placenta, the organ that supplies nutrients to a developing fetus. Misoprostol, a synthetic prostaglandin, causes the uterus to contract and expel the embryo through the vagina. Letrozole is an aromatase inhibitor that prevents estrogen synthesis and encourages ovulation. Recent studies suggest the use of letrozole before misoprostol or mifepristone for initiation of medical abortion can enhance treatment efficacy and reduce the need for surgical interventions.

== History ==
Medical abortions as a percentage of all abortions
Country	Percentage
Netherlands	34% in 2021
Italy	35% in 2020
Canada	37% in 2021
Belgium	38% in 2021
Germany	39% in 2022
New Zealand	46% in 2021
Spain	57% in 2024
United States	63% in 2023
Portugal	68% in 2021
Slovenia	72% in 2019
France	76% in 2021
Switzerland	80% in 2021
Denmark	83% in 2021
England and Wales	87% in 2021
Iceland	87% in 2021
Estonia	91% in 2021
Norway	95% in 2022
Sweden	96% in 2021
Finland	98% in 2021
Scotland	99% in 2021

Self managed abortion is not new—it is a historical practice involving herbs and other interventions. Swedish researchers began testing potential abortifacients in 1965. In 1968, the Swedish physician Lars Engström published a paper on a clinical trial, conducted at the women's clinic of Karolinska Hospital in Stockholm, of the compound F6103 on pregnant Swedish women with the aim of inducing abortion. It was the first clinical trial of an abortion pill to be conducted in Sweden. The paper, originally titled The Swedish Abortion Pill, was renamed to The Swedish Postconception Pill, due to the small number of induced abortions that occurred in the trial population. After these efforts were largely unsuccessful with F6103, the same researchers attempted to find an abortion pill with prostaglandins, capitalizing on the number of well-established prostaglandin scientists working in Sweden at the time; they were eventually awarded the 1982 Nobel Prize in Physiology for their work.

Medical abortion became a successful alternative method of abortion with the availability of prostaglandin analogs in the 1970s. One such analog is carboprost, which was successfully trialed in the United States in 1979.

In 1981, French pharmaceutical company Roussel-Uclaf developed the antiprogestogen mifepristone (also known as RU-486). Mifepristone was first approved for use in China and France in 1988, in Great Britain in 1991, in Sweden in 1992, in Austria, Belgium, Denmark, Finland, Georgia, Germany, Greece, Iceland, Israel, Liechtenstein, Luxembourg, Netherlands, Russia, Spain, and Switzerland in 1999, in Norway, Taiwan, Tunisia, and the United States in 2000, and in 70 additional countries from 2001 to 2023.

In 2000, mifepristone was approved by the US FDA for abortions through 49 days gestation. In 2016, the US FDA updated mifepristone's label to support usage through 70 days gestation.

=== Prevalence ===
In the United States, the portion of abortions that are medical abortions has increased: 0% in 2000, 24% in 2011, 53% in 2022, and 63% in 2023 (figures include only clinic-supervised abortions, and exclude self-managed abortions).

In England and Wales, the portion of medical abortions has increased: 47% in 2011, 70% in 2019, 85% in 2020, and 87% in 2021.

In Scotland, the portion of medical abortions has increased: 16% in 1992, 77% in 2012, 85% in 2018, and over 99% in 2021.

For second-trimester abortions, in 2009, medical abortion (using mifepristone in combination with a prostaglandin analog) was the most common method of abortion in Canada, most of Europe, China and India; in contrast to the US, where 96% of second-trimester abortions were performed surgically by dilation and evacuation.

== Access to medical abortion ==
Both drugs – mifepristone and misoprostol – are no longer covered by drug patents, and hence are available as generic drugs.

While the legality of abortion varies by country, and access may be difficult even in countries where it is legal, some non-profits have provided medical abortion pills to women on a boat in international waters (Women on Waves) or via shipment of pills directly to the patient.(Women on Web and Aid Access).

=== Telehealth access ===
Telehealth includes access to medical services that the person can perform at home, without in-person visits to clinic or provider offices. Telehealth for abortion involves having a video or phone appointment with a health care provider, or simply ordering the pills online and having them mailed to the patient. People who have used telehealth for medical abortion report being satisfied with the access it provides to abortion services. However, those who might need the service the most (those who are incarcerated, unhoused, or live on low income) are often inhibited from accessing it. Public information on telehealth options in the United States of America is available on line. Some populations cannot directly access telehealth services but there are non-traditional means for people to obtain the medications through third party outlets.

==== Clinic-to-clinic access ====
In this model, a provider communicates with a patient located at another site using clinic-to-clinic videoconferencing to provide medication abortion. This was introduced by Planned Parenthood of the Heartland in Iowa to allow a patient at one health facility to communicate via secure video with a health provider at another facility. This model has expanded to other Planned Parenthoods in multiple states as well other clinics providing abortion care.

==== Impact of COVID-19 ====
The COVID-19 pandemic challenged health policymakers worldwide which led to both indirect and direct effects on reproductive health access. The overall decrease in availability and delivery of crucial sexual health care, including safe abortions, amid the COVID-19 pandemic led to an increased incidence of complications and fatalities during pregnancy.

Pregnant individuals requested access to medical abortion more than surgical abortion during the pandemic, and preferred the ability to perform medical abortions at home via telehealth services. Data suggest that the increased use of telemedicine for abortion services during this period were a result of COVID-19 fear, reduced travel ability, stay-at-home orders, greater concealment, and the solace of home-care. This data supported the safety and efficacy of telehealth abortion services, and demonstrated its increasing demand. The severity and rate of complications after telehealth abortion services were low, mirroring overall medical abortion complication rates, including those performed within clinics or other medical facilities.

=== United States ===
Medication abortion in the US is increasingly utilized, and increasingly so via telehealth. Since the Dobbs decision and COVID-19 pandemic, telehealth medical abortions have become a more accessible option, particularly in states where abortion is banned or for patients living in rural areas. In states where abortion is banned, telehealth medical abortion is often the only way for a patient to legally access medical abortion, whereby they order pills online from a state where abortion is legal, and have the medications mailed to their home in their state. This is legally possible due to shield laws that allow abortion providers in certain states to prescribe and mail abortion pills out of state.

In the US, prescriptions for mifepristone may be filled by any pharmacy - online or brick-and-mortar - that has obtained a special certification. However many pharmacies choose not to supply the drugs and no pharmacy is required by law to do so. This regulation was provisionally implemented in Dec 2021, and was finalized by the US Food and Drug Administration (FDA) in January 2023.

From 2011 until 2021, a woman was required to visit a healthcare provider in-person (at a clinic or office) and receive mifepristone directly from the provider. The requirement to visit a clinic to receive the medication was removed by the FDA in December 2021, during the COVID-19 pandemic. Under the new rules, the prescription may be obtained via telehealth (phone calls or video conferencing with a healthcare provider), and then filled at any certified in-person or mail-order pharmacy. At the same time the FDA removed the requirement for an in-person visit, they added a requirement that dispensing pharmacies be "certified", which requires the pharmacy to have special permission to dispense the medications – a requirement the FDA imposes on only 40 medications out of more than 19,000 it manages.

The second medication used in medical abortion, misoprostol, is most commonly used for treating ulcers, and was never subject to the in-person dispensing constraints of mifepristone, and was always available from pharmacies with a prescription.

The FDA does not authorize the use of mifepristone for medical abortion after 70 days, unlike most other countries, which authorize medical abortion into the second trimester and even the third trimester.

Some states have passed laws that prohibit providers from examining the woman via phone or video conferencing, and instead require the woman to make an in-person visit to the provider to get the prescription.

In most states, abortion medications may be sent from a pharmacy to the patient via mail, but certain states have passed laws making that illegal, and requiring the medications to be obtained from a pharmacy or provider in-person.

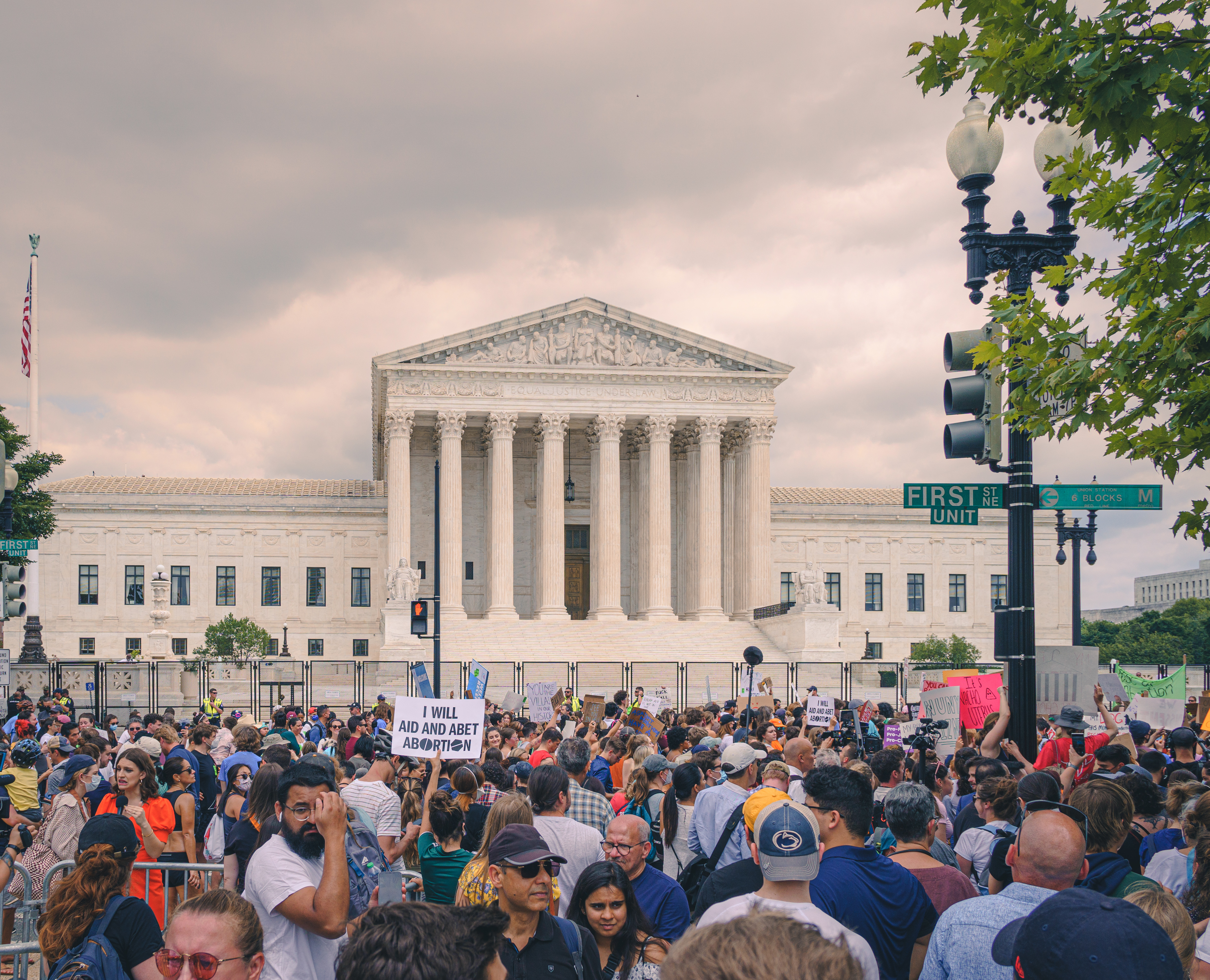
Protests outside US Supreme Court when Roe v Wade was overturned.

Interest in abortion medications in the United States reached record highs in 2022, after the Supreme Court of the United States draft Dobbs v. Jackson Women's Health Organization ruling that would overturn 1973's Roe v. Wade decision was leaked online. Interest was higher in states with more restrictions on access to abortion. Pro-choice activists in the US were exploring ways to make medical abortion more available, particularly in states where it is subject to limitations, with social media resources being utilized for this purpose.

In response to abortion restrictions imposed by some states after the Dobbs legal decision, several organizations that provide telehealth services related to medical abortion, such as Plan C and Hey Jane, saw an increase in inquiries and usage.

In March 2023, Governor Mark Gordon of Wyoming signed a bill outlawing the use of abortion pills in the state, making it the first US state to separately ban medical abortions from a ban on all abortion services. The new legislation, which went into effect in July 2023, criminalizes the "prescription, dispensation, distribution, sale, or use of any drug" for the purpose of obtaining or performing an abortion. Those who violate the law, excluding the pregnant woman, may be charged with a misdemeanor and could face a $9,000 fine and up to six months in jail. Fourteen other states have enacted blanket abortion bans that include medical abortions, however, and fifteen states already limit access to these medications. Abortion seekers do travel between states to seek care, often with significant difficulty.

In March 2024, some major pharmacy chains, such as CVS and Walgreens, received certification from the FDA to dispense mifepristone and sell it in states where it is legal. In those states, women seeking an abortion need to get a prescription from a healthcare provider, and can then buy the medication at a certified pharmacy. While legally allowed to dispense, most pharmacies choose not to supply. This does not violate US law.

In December 2024, the state of Texas filed a civil suit against a physician based in New York, alleging that the physician prescribed abortion drugs to a Texas resident. New York has a shield law that allows a prescriber who is sued to countersue in this type of situation. The legal status of interstate telemedicine, in particular, writing prescriptions, is an emerging area of law in the United States.

==== Direct-to-patient access ====
The direct-to-patient model allows for medication abortion to be provided without an in-person clinic visit. Instead of an in-person clinic visit, the patient receives counseling and instruction from the abortion provider via videoconference. The patient can be at any location, including their home. The medications necessary for the abortion are mailed directly to the patient. This is a model, called TelAbortion or no-test medication abortion (formerly no-touch medication abortion), being piloted and studied by Gynuity Health Projects, with special approval from the US Food and Drug Administration (FDA). This model has been shown to be safe, effective, efficient, and satisfactory. Complete abortion can be confirmed via telephone-based assessment.

In 2023, 24% of abortions provided by clinicians in the US were obtained via virtual or online clinics. In 2025, 28% of abortions were telehealth abortions. In US states with total abortion bans, telehealth made up 97-100% of abortions.

== Society and culture ==
The WHO affirms that laws and policies should support people's access to evidence-based medically approved care, including medical abortion. There are more controversies surrounding taking these pills and if people should self manage their abortion or not. Some reasons why people might choose to self managed include the desire for more privacy, reduced costs, and convenience.

=== "Reversal" controversy ===
Some anti-abortion groups claim that patients who change their mind about the abortion after taking mifepristone can "reverse" the abortion by administering progesterone (and not administering misoprostol). As of 2022, there is no scientifically rigorous evidence that the effects of mifepristone can be reversed this way. Even so, several states in the US require providers of non-surgical abortion who use mifepristone to tell patients that reversal is an option. In 2019, researchers initiated a small trial of the so-called "reversal" regimen using mifepristone followed by progesterone or placebo. The study was halted after 12 women enrolled and three experienced severe vaginal bleeding. The results raise serious safety concerns about using mifepristone without follow-up misoprostol.
