= 2023 South by Southwest Film & TV Festival =

Edition of film and television festival

- Location: Austin, Texas, U.S.
- Festival date: March 10–19, 2023
- Website: www.sxsw.com
- 2024 2022

The 2023 South by Southwest Film & TV Festival took place from March 10 to 19 at several venues in Austin, Texas, as part of the larger South by Southwest annual event. The film program opened with fantasy heist comedy film Dungeons & Dragons: Honor Among Thieves and closed with biographical sports drama film Air. The television program opened with satirical black comedy series Swarm and closed with comedy drama series Beef.

== Official Selection ==
=== Feature films ===
==== Headliners ====
Title	Director(s)	Production country
Air (closing film)	Ben Affleck	United States
Bottoms	Emma Seligman	United States
Dungeons & Dragons: Honor Among Thieves (opening film)	Jonathan Goldstein and John Francis Daley	United States
Evil Dead Rise	Lee Cronin	United States
Flamin' Hot	Eva Longoria	United States
John Wick: Chapter 4	Chad Stahelski	United States
Joy Ride	Adele Lim	United States
Problemista	Julio Torres	United States
Tetris	Jon S. Baird	United States

==== Narrative Feature Competition ====
Title	Director(s)	Production country
I Used to Be Funny	Ally Pankiw	Canada
Late Bloomers	Lisa Steen	United States
Mustache	Imran J. Khan	United States
Parachute	Brittany Snow	United States
Pure O	Dillon Tucker	United States
Raging Grace	Paris Zarcilla	United Kingdom
Scrambled	Leah McKendrick	United States
Story Ave	Aristotle Torres	United States

==== Documentary Feature Competition ====
Title	Director(s)	Production country
Angel Applicant	Ken August Meyer	United States
Another Body	Sophie Compton and Reuben Hamlyn	United States
Geoff McFetridge: Drawing a Life	Dan Covert	United States
Join or Die	Pete and Rebecca Davis	United States
Pay or Die	Rachael Dyer and Alexander Ruderman	United States
Queendom	Agniia Galdanova	France, United States
Riders on the Storm	Jason Motlagh and Mark Oltmanns	Austria
You Were My First Boyfriend	Cecilia Aldarondo and Sarah Enid Hagey	United States

==== Narrative Spotlight ====
Title	Director(s)	Production country
Americana	Tony Tost	United States
Appendage	Anna Zlokovic	United States
BlackBerry	Matt Johnson	Canada
Bleeding Love (Note: Bleeding Love was previously titled You Sing Loud, I Sing Louder on its premiere.)	Emma Westenberg	United States
Cora Bora	Hannah Pearl Utt	United States
Deadland	Lance Larson	United States
Down Low	Rightor Doyle	United States
Fitting In (Note: Fitting In was previously titled Bloody Hell on its premiere.)	Molly McGlynn	Canada
Frybread Face and Me	Billy Luther	United States
Hail Mary	Rosemary Rodriguez	United States
Hypnotic	Robert Rodriguez	United States
If You Were the Last	Kristian Mercado	United States
The Long Game	Julio Quintana	United States
National Anthem	Luke Gilford	United States
Northern Comfort	Hafsteinn Gunnar Sigurðsson	Germany, Iceland, United Kingdom
Only the Good Survive	Dutch Southern	United States
Peak Season	Henry Loevner and Steven Kanter	United States
Self Reliance	Jake Johnson	United States
This Closeness	Kit Zauhar	United States
Upon Entry	Alejandro Rojas and Juan Sebastián Vásquez	Spain
War Pony	Gina Gammell and Riley Keough	United States

==== Documentary Spotlight ====
Title	Director(s)	Production country
A Disturbance in the Force	Jeremy Coon and Steve Kozak	United States
The Arc of Oblivion	Ian Cheney	United States
Art for Everybody	Miranda Yousef	United States
Being Mary Tyler Moore	James Adolphus	United States
Black Barbie: A Documentary	Lagueria Davis	United States
Citizen Sleuth	Chris Kasick	United States
Confessions of a Good Samaritan	Penny Lane	United States
Great Photo, Lovely Life	Amanda Mustard and Rachel Beth Anderson	United States
The Herricanes	Olivia Kuan	United States
The Lady Bird Diaries	Dawn Porter	United States
Last Stop Larrimah	Thomas Tancred	United States
The New Americans: Gaming a Revolution	Ondi Timoner	United States
Periodical	Lina Lyte Plioplyte	United States
Satan Wants You	Steve J. Adams and Sean Horlor	Canada
This World Is Not My Own	Petter Ringbom and Marquise Stillwell	United States
Who I Am Not	Tünde Skovrán	Romania, Canada, South Africa, Germany, United States
Wild Life	Elizabeth Chai Vasarhelyi and Jimmy Chin	United States
You Can Call Me Bill	Alexandre O. Philippe	United States

==== Global ====
Title	Director(s)	Production country
Ek Jagah Apni	Ektara Collective	India
Kite Zo A: Leave the Bones	Kaveh Nabatian	Canada, Haiti
My Drywall Cocoon	Caroline Fioratti	Brazil
The Ordinaries	Sophie Linnenbaum	Germany
Sister & Sister	Kattia González Zúñiga	Panama

==== Festival Favorites ====
Title	Director(s)	Production country
Fancy Dance	Erica Tremblay	United States
Food and Country	Laura Gabbert	United States
Fremont	Babak Jalali	United States
Going Varsity in Mariachi	Alejandra Vasquez and Sam Osborn	United States
Is There Anybody Out There?	Ella Glendining	United States
It's Only Life After All	Alexandria Bombach	United States
Kokomo City	D. Smith	United States
Little Richard: I Am Everything	Lisa Cortés	United States
No Ordinary Campaign	Christopher Burke	United States
Plan C	Tracy Droz Tragos	United States
Polite Society	Nida Manzoor	United Kingdom
Robert Irwin: A Desert of Pure Feeling	Jennifer Lane	United States
The Starling Girl	Laurel Parmet	United States
Still: A Michael J. Fox Movie	Davis Guggenheim	United States
Theater Camp	Molly Gordon and Nick Lieberman	United States

==== Midnighters ====
Title	Director(s)	Production country
Aberrance	Baatar Batsukh	Mongolia
Brooklyn 45	Ted Geoghegan	United States
Furies	Veronica Ngo	Vietnam
It Lives Inside	Bishal Dutta	United States
Late Night with the Devil	Colin and Cameron Cairnes	Australia, United Arab Emirates
Monolith	Matt Vesely	Australia
Talk to Me	Danny and Michael Philippou	Australia
The Wrath of Becky	Matt Angel and Suzanne Coote	United States

==== 24 Beats Per Second ====
Title	Director(s)	Production country
299 Queen Street West	Sean Menard	Canada
The Zombies: Hung Up on a Dream	Robert Schwartzman	United States
Joan Baez: I Am a Noise	Miri Navasky, Karen O'Connor, and Maeve O'Boyle	United States
Louder Than You Think	Jed I. Rosenberg	United States
Love to Love You, Donna Summer	Roger Ross Williams and Brooklyn Sudano	United States
Max Roach: The Drum Also Waltzes	Sam Pollard and Ben Shapiro	United States
Rebelión	José Luis Rugeles Gracia	Colombia
Revival69: The Concert That Rocked the World	Ron Chapman	United States

==== Visions ====
Title	Director(s)	Production country
The Angry Black Girl and Her Monster	Bomani J. Story	United States
Anhell69	Theo Montoya	United States
The Artifice Girl	Franklin Ritch	United States
Caterpillar	Liza Mandelup	United States
Chronicles of a Wandering Saint	Tomás Gómez Bustillo	Argentina, United States
Molli and Max in the Future	Michael Lukk Litwak	United States
Tobacco Barns	Rocío Mesa	Spain, United States
Until Branches Bend	Sophie Jarvis	Canada, Switzerland
With Love and a Major Organ	Kim Albright	Canada
The Young Wife	Tayarisha Poe	United States

=== Television ===
==== TV Premiere ====
Title	Showrunner(s)	Production country	Network
A Small Light	Joan Rater and Tony Phelan	United States	National Geographic
American Born Chinese	Kelvin Yu	United States	Disney+
Beef (closing series)	Lee Sung Jin	United States	Netflix
The Big Door Prize	David West Read	United States	Apple TV+
I'm a Virgo	Boots Riley	United States	Amazon Prime Video
Love & Death	David E. Kelley	United States	HBO Max
The Luckiest Guy in the World	Steve James	United States	ESPN
Lucky Hank	Paul Lieberstein and Aaron Zelman	United States	AMC
Mrs. Davis	Tara Hernandez and Damon Lindelof	United States	Peacock
Rabbit Hole	Glenn Ficarra and John Requa	United States	Paramount+
Slip	Zoe Lister-Jones	United States	The Roku Channel
Swarm (opening series)	Donald Glover and Janine Nabers	United States	Amazon Prime Video

==== TV Spotlight ====
Title	Showrunner(s)	Production country	Network
Blindspotting (season 2)	Rafael Casal	United States	Starz
Demascus	Tearrance Chisholm and Kirk Moore	United States	AMC
Shatter Belt	James Ward Byrkit	United States	Amazon Prime Video

==== Independent TV Pilot Competition ====
Title	Showrunner(s)	Production country
A Guide to Not Dying Completely Alone	Kevin Yee	United States
Chuchi & Adaliz	Ashley Soto Paniagua	United States
Grown	Jocko Sims	United States
Harbor Island	Calvin Lee Reeder	United States
Marvin?	Anton van der Linden and George Gottl	Netherlands
Metal Man	Tomas Pais	United States
Notarize Me	Erika Rankin	United States

=== Short films ===
==== Narrative shorts competition ====
Title	Director	Production country
Breaking Fast with a Coca Cola	Amy Omar	United States
The Breakthrough	Daniel Sinclair	United States
Closing Dynasty	Lloyd Lee Choi	United States
Deliver Me	Joecar Hanna	United States
Endless Sea	Sam Shainberg	United States
The Fading (Les Battues)	Rafaël Beauchamp	Canada
The Family Circus	Andrew Fitzgerald	United States
Flores del Otro Patio	Jorge Cadena	Colombia, Switzerland
Fuck Me, Richard	Lucy McKendrick, Charles Polinger	Australia, United States
Graveyard of Horses	Xiaoxuan Jiang	China
I Probably Shouldn't Be Telling You This	Emma Weinswig	United States
It Turns Blue	Shadi Karamroudi	Iran
The Key	Rakan Mayasi	Belgium, France, Palestine
Leonetty	Logan Jackson	United States
Never Fuggedaboutit	Dustin Waldman	United States
Rest Stop	Crystal Kayiza	United States
Scotty's Vag	Chaconne Martin-Berkowicz	United States
Sisters of the Rotation	Michel Zarazir, Gaby Zarazir	Lebanon
Slick Talk	Courtney Loo, David Karp	United States
Take Me Home	Liz Sargent	United States

==== Documentary shorts competition ====
Title	Director	Production country
Ball People	Scott Lazer	United States
El Bastón	Nemo Allen	Colombia, United States
Birdsong	Omi Zola Gupta, Sparsh Ahuja	United Kingdom
The Bus	Sandra Reina	Spain
The Dads	Luchina Fisher	United States
How to Rig an Election: The Racist History of the 1876 Presidential Contest	Emily Kunstler, Sarah Kunstler	United States
Margie Soudek's Salt and Pepper Shakers	Meredith Moore	United States
Mother of the Dawn	Janell Shirtcliff	United States
Nǎi Nai & Wài Pó (Grandma & Grandma)	Sean Wang	United States
Puffling	Jessica Bishopp	United Kingdom
Roger J. Carter: Rebel Revolutionary	Justin Fairweather	United States
Suddenly TV	Roopa Gogineni	Qatar
Where the Sun Always Shines	Rosie Baldwin	United Kingdom

==== Animated shorts competition ====
Title	Director	Production country
Ashkasha	Lara Maltz	Argentina, Spain
Beyond the Fringe	Han Tang, Costanza Baj	Spain
Christopher at Sea	Tom CJ Brown	France, United Kingdom, United States
The Debutante	Elizabeth Hobbs	United Kingdom
Ice Merchants	João Gonzalez	Portugal
Remove Hind Legs Before Consumption	Lukas Wind, Finn Meisner, Leslie Herzi	Switzerland
Sandwich Cat	David Fidalgo	Spain
Spring Roll Dream	Mai Vu	United Kingdom
Sprout	Zora Kovac	United States
A Tiny Man	Aude David, Mikaël Gaudin	France

==== Midnight shorts competition ====
Title	Director	Production country
Dead Enders	Fidel Ruiz-Healy, Tyler Walker	United States
Every House is Haunted	Bryce McGuire	United States
The Flute	Nick Roney	Ireland, United States
Kodama	Brian M Tang	United States
The Mundanes	Nicole Daddona	United States
Pennies from Heaven	Sandy Honig	United States
Pussy Love	Linda Krauss	Germany
Run	Alex Prager	United States
Vibrator Girl	Kara Strait	United States
We Forgot About the Zombies	Chris McInroy	United States
You're Not Home	Derek Ugochukwu	Ireland

==== Texas shorts competition ====
Title	Director	Production country
Breaking Silence	Amy Bench, Annie Silverstein	United States
Call Me Mommy	Haley Alea Erickson, Taylor Washington	United States
La Cosecha	Samuel Díaz Fernández	United States
Dressed	Bethiael Alemayoh	United States
Exit 238	Henry Davis	United States
Eyestring	Javier Devitt	Argentina, United States
Funny Face	Jude Hope Harris	United States
When You Left Me on That Boulevard	Kayla Abuda Galang	United States
Wüm	Anna Margaret Hollyman	United States

== Awards ==
The following awards were presented at the festival:

=== Grand Jury ===
- Narrative Feature Competition Jury Award: Raging Grace by Paris Zarcilla
- Documentary Feature Competition Jury Award: Angel Applicant by Ken August Meyer
- Narrative Short Competition Jury Award: It Turns Blue by Shadi Karamroudi
  - Narrative Short Competition Special Jury Award: Flores del Otro Patio by Jorge Cadena
- Documentary Short Competition Jury Award: Nǎi Nai & Wài Pó by Sean Wang
  - Documentary Short Competition Special Jury Award: Suddenly TV by Roopa Gogineni
- Midnight Shorts Competition Jury Award: The Flute by Nick Roney
  - Midnight Shorts Competition Special Jury Award: Pennies from Heaven by Sandy Honig
- Animated Short Competition Jury Award: The Debutante by Elizabeth Hobbs
- Music Video Competition Jury Award: Amanda Sum – "Different Than Before" by Mayumi Yoshida
  - Music Video Competition Special Jury Award: Residente featuring Ibeyi – "This Is Not America" by Grégory Ohrel
- Texas Short Competition Jury Award: Breaking Silence by Amy Bench and Annie Silverstein
  - Texas Short Competition Special Jury Award: When You Left Me On That Boulevard by Kayla Abuda Galang
- TV Pilot Competition Jury Award: Grown by Jocko Sims
- TV Pilot Competition Special Jury Award for Outstanding Performance: Josh Fadem in Harbor Island
- Janet Pierson Champion Award: Lizzie Shapiro
- Louis Black "Lone Star" Award: The Lady Bird Diaries by Dawn Porter
  - Louis Black "Lone Star" Award Special Jury Award: The Herricanes by Olivia Kuan
- Thunderbird Rising Award: Paris Zarcilla for Raging Grace
  - Thunderbird Rising Special Award: Brittany Snow for Parachute
- The Hope Award: Still: A Michael J. Fox Movie by Davis Guggenheim
  - The Hope Special Award: Confessions of a Good Samaritan by Penny Lane
- Adam Yauch Hörnblowér Award: Chronicles of a Wandering Saint by Tomás Gómez Bustillo
- ZEISS Cinematography Award: Carolina Costa for Fancy Dance

=== Audience Awards ===
- Headliner Audience Award: Flamin' Hot by Eva Longoria
- Narrative Feature Competition Audience Award: Mustache by Imran J. Khan
- Documentary Feature Competition Audience Award: Geoff McFetridge: Drawing a Life by Dan Covert
- Narrative Spotlight Audience Award: The Long Game by Julio Quintana
- Documentary Spotlight Audience Award: The Herricanes by Olivia Kuan
- Visions Audience Award: Tobacco Barns by Rocío Mesa
- Midnighter Audience Award: It Lives Inside by Bishal Dutta
- Global Audience Award: Ek Jagah Apni by Ektara Collective
- 24 Beats Per Second Audience Award: Louder Than You Think by Jed I. Rosenberg
- Festival Favorite Audience Award: No Ordinary Campaign by Christopher Burke
- Narrative Short Competition Audience Award: Closing Dynasty by Lloyd Lee Choi
- Documentary Short Competition Audience Award: Nǎi Nai & Wài Pó by Sean Wang
- Animated Short Competition Audience Award: Sandwich Cat by David Fidalgo
- Midnight Short Competition Audience Award: Dead Enders by Fidel Ruiz-Healy and Tyler Walker
- Texas Short Competition Audience Award: Breaking Silence by Amy Bench and Annie Silverstein
- Music Video Competition Audience Award: Drew Ashby – "HER" by Chris Scholar and Bevin Brown
- TV Premiere Audience Award: The Luckiest Guy in the World by Steve James
- TV Spotlight Audience Award: Blindspotting (season 2) by Rafael Casal
- Independent TV Pilot Competition Audience Award: Notarize Me by Erika Rankin
