= Justin Schein =

- Education: Master's Degree, Documentary Filmmaking
- Alma mater: Stanford University; Johns Hopkins University
- Spouse: Eden Wurmfeld
- Website: Shadowbox Films

Justin Schein is an American documentary filmmaker and cinematographer. He has been cinematographer on over 60 films and is the co-founder of Shadowbox Films. He is best known for his work on cinéma vérité films that include America Rebuilds: A Year at Ground Zero, No Impact Man, and Left on Purpose.

== Early life and education ==
Schein was born in New York and attended Horace Mann School in The Bronx prior to enrolling in Johns Hopkins University in Baltimore, Maryland. He graduated from Johns Hopkins in 1990 and began working as an intern at Great Projects, a film company in New York City. He later returned to school where he earned a master's degree in documentary filmmaking from Stanford University.

== Career ==
Schein has been involved in directing and cinematography for more than 20 years. He has been the cinematographer on over 60 films that have appeared on networks such as The BBC, The Discovery Channel, HBO, and PBS. Schein is also the founder of Shadownbox Films, a film studio he started in 1998 along with co-founder David Mehlman, a fellow Stanford graduate.

One of Schein's more notable early projects is America Rebuilds: A Year at Ground Zero, a documentary that looked at the cleanup of Ground Zero after the September 11 attacks as well as the debate over what should replace the Twin Towers. He collaborated on the project with Daniel Polin, president of Great Projects Film Company, the company where he interned after graduating from Johns Hopkins. Polin was producer on the documentary while Schein worked as co-producer and cinematographer. America Rebuilds was narrated by Kevin Spacey and appeared on PBS on the one year anniversary of the attacks.

In 2009, Schein released No Impact Man, a documentary film he directed with Laura Gabbert based on the book of the same title by Colin Beavan. The film, which premiered at the Sundance Film Festival and opened theatrically September 4, 2009, follows Colin Beavan and his family during their year-long experiment to have sustainable zero impact on the environment. The rights of the film were picked up by Oscilloscope Laboratories.

Schein worked as the cinematographer for the documentary My So-Called Enemy. Released in 2010, filming began in the summer of 2002 and documents the relationships between six Jewish and Palestinian girls who come to the United States for a leadership camp. The film documents the bonds that grow between the girls in absence of the violence where the girls live back home. It screened at numerous film festivals, including winning a Cine Golden Eagle and being awarded the Best Documentary at the 2010 Boston Jewish Film Festival.

Schein's recent projects include Left On Purpose, a documentary on the life of political activist Mayer Vishner. Schein originally wanted to document the rebellious legacy of Vishner when he finds out Vishner has severe depression and wants to end his own life as his last political act. Schein and Vishner become friends during the filming and Vishner did not reveal his wishes until later in the filming. Vishner committed suicide on August 22, 2013, twelve hours after dropping his cat off with writer Michael Ventura in Texas. The film was funded through a successful Kickstarter campaign in 2015 as well as supported from Sundance Documentary Fund, The Jerome Foundation, and Catapult Film Fund. The night before his death, Vishner told Ventura while smiling "part of me really wants to see the movie."

Left On Purpose began its festival run in the fall of 2015 and went on to win awards at multiple domestic and international film festivals including Audience Awards at DOC NYC and Woodstock Film Festival. As of February 10, 2017, it is available for streaming on multiple major online platforms.

In the fall of 2024, Justin premiered Death & Taxes at DOC NYC. It is a feature documentary that looks at the American Dream and the problems of wealth inequality through the lens of the estate tax. It is also a personal story of his relationship with his father Harvey Schein who went from poverty to great success and then became focused on reducing his estate tax.

=== Partial filmography ===
Year	Title	Role
1998	Kofi Annan: Eye of the Storm	Cinematographer
2002	America Rebuilds: A Year at Ground Zero	Co-producer and cinematographer
2003	I'm A College Baller	Co-producer and director
2005	Red Hook Justice	Cinematographer
2008	Four Seasons Lodge	Cinematographer
2009	Pressure Cooker	Director of photography
2009	No Impact Man	Co-director and cinematographer
2010	My So-Called Enemy	Cinematographer
2012	Still Moving: Pilobolus at Forty	Cinematographer
2012	One Nation Under Dog	Cinematographer
2013	National Geographic Slang Hunters	Cinematographer
2015	Left On Purpose	Director and cinematographer
2015	Always in Season	Cinematographer (post-production)
2016	Harry's Gift	Cinematographer and co-producer(post-production)
2017	Saving Capitalism	Executive Producer
2020	Chasing Childhood	Director of Photography
2020	Crip Camp (nominated for Best Documentary 2020)	Director of Photography
2024	Death & Taxes	Director and Producer
