= Accident on Hill Road =

2009 Indian film by Mahesh Nair

- Directed by: Mahesh Nair
- Written by: Varun Grover (dialogues)
- Story by: Mahesh Nair; Siddharth Parmar; Stuart Gordon
- Produced by: Nari Hira
- Starring: Farooq Sheikh; Abhimanyu Singh; Celina Jaitly; Rukhsar Rehman
- Cinematography: Ravi Walia
- Edited by: Amit Parmar
- Music by: Raju Singh
- Distributed by: Magna Film Production
- Release date: 31 December 2009
- Running time: 105 minutes
- Country: India
- Language: Hindi
- Budget: 2.5 crore

Accident on Hill Road is a 2009 Indian film, directed by Mahesh Nair and produced by Nari Hira, starring Farooq Sheikh, Abhimanyu Singh, and Celina Jaitly. The film is an authorised remake of the 2007 American film Stuck, which is based on the true story of Chante Mallard and her murder of Gregory Glenn Biggs.

== Plot ==
Sonam (Celina Jaitly) is approved for a job in London and begins the process of obtaining a visa. After attending a party, she consumes excessive alcohol and decides to drive home despite her friend's warnings. On the way, she accidentally hits a man named Prakash (Farooq Sheikh) with her car. She tries to drive the car to her parking lot secretly and searches for help. She cannot afford to go to the police because it can lead to strict punishment for 'drinking and driving' and her VISA could be cancelled. Thus, she keeps Prakash in the parking lot. With all these problems, she is late arriving the next day to the hospital in which she works.

Without any other options, she takes the help of her drug dealer boyfriend Sid (Abhimanyu Singh). Sid consoles her, and they have sex. The next day, they both plan to just kill Prakash and dump him. However, as soon as Sid begins to execute the plan, it goes in an unexpected direction. Prakash kills Sid when Sid tries to do the deed. Now Sonam finds out that Prakash is alive and Sid is dead. To avoid a police case or any other trouble, she plans to kill him at any cost. But Prakash somehow dodges her and tries to escape the parking garage. While making this attempt, Sonam hits him in the head and almost kills him. She pulls him back to the garage and pours diesel all over the garage and tries to burn it. Meanwhile, Prakash uses the car and dashes Sonam. He again tries to escape while Sonam begs for help. In anger of helplessness, she shoots at Prakash, which burns the whole garage. Sonam dies, but Prakash gets out, and some people spot him and rescue him.

== Cast ==
- Farooq Sheikh as Prakash Shrivastava
- Abhimanyu Singh as Sid
- Celina Jaitly as Sonam Chopra
- Manmeet Singh as Cab driver
- Rukhsar Rehman as Warden
- Shammi as Mrs. Wadia

== Release ==
=== Critical reception ===
Accident on Hill Road received mostly negative reviews from critics. Rajeev Masand said the film is "unintentionally comical", Taran Adarsh gave it only one star out of five and Nithya Ramani of Rediff called it "a terrible excuse for a film".

== See also ==
- Stuck, the original 2007 American film
- Creepshow 2, a 1987 horror anthology film including the segment "The Hitch-hiker" in which a similar vehicular homicide is portrayed and the zombie-like victim follows the driver all the way back to her garage.
