= Shuko Akune =

American film, television, and stage actress

- Akane in E/R (1984)
- Born: April 1959 (age 67); Wahoo, Nebraska, U.S.
- Occupations: Actress and voice actress
- Spouse: Michael W. Pacelli (m. 1990)

Shuko Akune is an American film, television and stage actress best known for such films and television series as E/R, Come See the Paradise, Alien Nation, Cruel Intentions 2, G.I. Joe: The Movie, Murphy Brown, and The Steve Harvey Show.

In 1988 Akune won the San Diego Critics Circle Awards for Best Supporting Actress for her performance as a Japanese war bride in Velina Hasu Houston's play Tea.

== Filmography ==
Year	Title	Role	Notes
1984-5	E/R	Maria Amardo	
1985	Trapper John, M.D.	Maritza Agaya	
1985	Tab Lloyd: Investigative Reporter	Connie Sunomono	TV movie
1985	Brothers	Lin Sue	
1986	He's the Mayor	Penny	
1986	The Redd Foxx Show	Mariko	
1986	The Wizard	Mya	
1988	Alien Nation	Police Secretary	
1988	Kid Safe	Tina	
1989	Thirtysomething	Susan	
1989	Hot Prospects	Roxy	
1990	Murphy Brown	Ivy	
1990	Come See the Paradise	Reiko Sakoda	
1990	Newhart	Sedaka	
1991	Empty Nest	Secretary	
1991	Fire: Trapped on the 37th Floor	Marika	TV movie
1992	Nightmare in the Daylight	Hotel Clerk	
1994	Blankman	Campaign Worker	
1996	Seinfeld	Receptionist	
1999	Providence	Focus Group Lady	
2000	The Steve Harvey Show	Principal Sito	
2000	King of the Ants	Meade Park	

=== Voice Work ===
Year	Title	Role	Notes
1987	G.I. Joe: The Movie	Jinx	Voice
2007	Stuck	Hospital Voice Menu	Voice
