= Plasticat =

2003 Croatian computer-animated film

- Directed by: Simon Bogojević-Narath
- Produced by: Ivan Ratković Tolja, Lado Skorin Komarac
- Music by: Hrvoje Štefotić
- Animation by: Boris Goreta
- Production company: Kenges
- Release date: 2003
- Running time: 9 minutes
- Country: Croatia

Plasticat is a 2003 Croatian computer-animated short film by Simon Bogojević-Narath of Kenges Studio. The short blends a post-apocaliptic sci-fi setting with humanist themes. The short won a number of awards at film festivals in São Paulo (Anima mundi, 2003), Zagreb (Oktavija, Dani hrvatskog filma, 2003), London (London International Animation Festival, BFI Future Film Festival, 2004) and Brussels (Brussels International Fantastic Film Festival, 2005).
