= Lionel Mark Smith =

American actor

- Lionel Mark Smith on Remington Steele (1984)
- Born: February 5, 1946; Chicago, Illinois, U.S.
- Died: February 13, 2008 (aged 62); Inglewood, California, U.S.
- Occupation: Actor

Lionel Mark Smith (February 5, 1946 – February 13, 2008) was an American film and theater actor.

Smith frequently worked with David Mamet and appeared in several films including Galaxina, Homicide, Edmond, State and Main, Spartan, and Treasure of Pirate's Point. He also appeared on such television series as Seinfeld, NYPD Blue, Beverly Hills, 90210, Hill Street Blues, and The Unit.

His last appearance was in the 2007 horror film Stuck. He died of cancer in 2008, aged 62.

== Life ==
Smith has been called a "long-time colleague" of David Mamet, appearing in various plays and films of the latter.

At his death in 2008, his career was saluted in the Chicago Tribune, the Los Angeles Times, Variety, and The Hollywood Reporter.

== Filmography ==
Year	Title	Role	Notes
1978	Youngblood	Chaka	
1980	Galaxina	Maurice	
1981	The Postman Always Rings Twice	Crapshooter	
1982	Remington Steele	Slats Kittridge	Episode: "Second Base Steele"
1988	Things Change	Pit Boss	
1991	Homicide	Charlie Olcott	
1992	Batman: The Animated Series	Bus Driver	Voice, episode: "Robin's Reckoning"
1995	Above Suspicion	Larry	
1997	The Spanish Prisoner	Detective Jones	
1997	Road Ends	Gunman #1	
1999	The Mod Squad	Lanier	
1999	Treasure of Pirate's Point	Patch / Deputy #1	
1999	Life Among the Cannibals	Detective Bob	
1999	Stranger in My House	Sergeant Davis	
1999	Magnolia	Detective	
2000	State and Main	Bill Smith	
2003	King of the Ants	Carl	
2004	Spartan	Colonel Blane	
2005	Edmond	Pimp	
2007	Stuck	Sam	
