= Nizam Peerwani =

American medical examiner

Nizam Peerwani is the former chief medical examiner for Tarrant County, Texas. Locally, he is notable for his role in the David Koresh–Mount Carmel incident in Waco, Texas and in the trial of Chante Jawan Mallard for the murder of Gregory Glenn Biggs.

Peerwani is a graduate of the American University of Beirut (MD '76). He completed his residency in pathology at Baylor University Medical Center in Dallas, and is board-certified in clinical, anatomic and forensic pathology.

He worked with Physicians for Human Rights on mass graves in Rwanda.

He retired from the post of medical examiner in 2021 following accusations that he had overseen "mistakes in autopsies and [given] questionable trial testimony in a death penalty case". There were allegations "that the DA’s office has a history of covering up criminal acts by Peerwani over the course of the ME's 42-year career".
