= You Were My First Boyfriend =

- Directed by: Cecilia Aldarondo; Sarah Enid Hagey
- Written by: Cecilia Aldarondo; Sarah Enid Hagey
- Produced by: Ines Hofmann Kanna; Cecilia Aldarondo
- Cinematography: J. Bennett; Brennan Vance
- Edited by: Shannon Kennedy; Sarah Enid Hagey
- Music by: Angélica Negrón
- Production companies: HBO Documentary Films; Blackscrackle Films
- Distributed by: HBO
- Release dates: March 10, 2023 (SXSW); November 3, 2023
- Running time: 97 minutes
- Country: United States
- Languages: English; Spanish

You Were My First Boyfriend is a 2023 American documentary film, directed by Cecilia Aldarondo and Sarah Enid Hagey. It follows Aldarondo as she reconciles her teen years, revisiting her most formative and cringeworthy experiences.

It had its world premiere at South by Southwest on March 10, 2023, and is scheduled to be released in a limited release on November 3, 2023, prior to broadcasting on HBO on November 8, 2023.

== Premise ==
Spurred by her 20th high school reunion, Cecilia Aldarondo revisits her adolescence growing up in Winter Park, Florida. The relationships and memories she reexamines include her first serious crush, her bullies, and her childhood best friend whom she drifted away from. To recreate her formative experiences, Aldarondo casts actors to portray the kids who still haunt her, while she portrays her teenage self.

== Production ==
Cecilia Aldarondo struggled to secure financing for the film, pitching the film various times over the course of five years, with Netflix and Hulu passing on the film, with HBO Documentary Films agreeing to produce and finance. The film received grants from Cinereach, Sundance Institute and IFP. Sarah Enid Hagey was later brought on board the project as a co-director, writer, and editor.

== Release ==
The film had its world premiere at the 2023 South by Southwest Film & TV Festival on March 10, 2023. It is scheduled to be released in a limited release on November 3, 2023, prior to being broadcast on HBO on November 8, 2023.

== Critical reception ==
Claire Shaffer of The New York Times reviewed the film positively, expressing it "is at its most effective when Aldarondo moves beyond teen lust and into the more complicated aspects of her upbringing. Her Puerto Rican heritage made her an easy target for bullying at her predominantly white high school, but Aldarondo was not exempt from acting cruel to those around her to fit in. She rehashes those nuances through, among other things, creating a shot-for-shot remake of Tori Amos’s 'Crucify' music video with her sister Laura. It’s just zany enough to work".

Writing for The Gate, Andrew Parker commented, "You Were My First Boyfriend asks existential questions about the reliability of memory, and why people tend on to things that are often linked to hurtful or awkward memories. It looks at what it’s like growing up middle class in a largely well-to-do suburb, living in the shadow of more popular and conventionally attractive siblings, and what it takes to confront the harsh truth that you’ve also been cruel or unkind to someone in the past." He said while the documentary can at times feel self-indulgent, "by putting herself out there and allowing herself to be endearingly silly and vulnerable, Aldarondo and co-director Sarah Enid Hagey broach bigger questions about the baggage we carry with us from childhood into adulthood".
