= Raging Grace =

2023 British horror film

- Official poster
- Directed by: Paris Zarcilla
- Written by: Paris Zarcilla
- Produced by: Chi Thai; Darlene Catly Malimas
- Starring: Max Eigenmann; Jaeden Paige Boadilla; Leanne Best; David Hayman
- Cinematography: Joel Honeywell
- Edited by: Christopher C.F. Chow
- Music by: Jon Clarke
- Production company: Last Conker
- Distributed by: Modern Films
- Release dates: 12 March 2023 (SXSW); 29 December 2023 (United Kingdom)
- Running time: 100 minutes
- Countries: United Kingdom; Philippines
- Languages: English; Tagalog

Raging Grace is a 2023 British horror film directed and co-written by Paris Zarcilla. The film stars Max Eigenmann, Jaeden Paige Boadilla, Leanne Best, and David Hayman.

== Plot ==
Joy is an undocumented Filipina immigrant in the UK who has a young daughter named Grace. Joy takes a job as a housekeeper for a woman named Katherine. Inside Katherine's mansion is Katherine's uncle Mr. Garrett, who's bedridden and mostly unconscious. Joy hides Grace in the mansion without Katherine's knowledge.

One day, Grace observes Katherine has been feeding Mr. Garrett sleeping pills. On another night, Grace finds a dead Filipina woman tucked away in a glass box in a secluded area of the abode. Katherine forces Joy to keep administering the wrong medication to Mr. Garrett, much to Joy's distress. One day, while Katherine is absent, Joy cooks up a liquid herbal remedy and administers it to Mr. Garrett. Mr. Garrett becomes lucid, calling for someone named Gloria, and (upon Joy explaining the situation) tells Joy that Katherine is an imposter. Mr. Garrett verbally expresses an affinity for Filipino people, and offers Joy and Grace a permanent job and residence. He insists that Grace call him "lolo" (meaning "grandpa") and that Joy call him "master." Joy discovers undelivered letters from Gloria (Mr. Garrett's former Filipina nanny) to her family, expressing distress at not being with them.

Grace takes a liking to Mr. Garrett, but eventually Mr. Garrett's nefarious nature becomes evident. He mutters that he longs for the days when "there was a hierarchy" and when "they knew their place." It's revealed that he had Katherine's mother unjustly committed in order to steal her fortune. Katherine takes Joy to the secluded area containing the old woman, revealing the woman to be Gloria.

Police come to the abode, saying that they've received word of an illegal immigrant on the premises. They haul Joy away. Katherine prepares to kill Mr. Garrett, but Mr. Garrett gets Grace to inject Katherine with a substance that causes her to violently hallucinate before tumbling down the stairs. Grace urges Mr. Garrett to help bring Joy back, but then realizes that it was he who called the police to the house. A violent struggle between Mr. Garrett, Grace, and Katherine (who's still alive) ensues, leading to the mansion catching fire and Grace and Katherine escaping.

Later, Katherine helps Grace reunite with Joy, and also covertly gives Joy advice on how to stay in the country, which involves Joy reuniting with Grace's biological father.

== Cast ==
- Max Eigenmann as Joy
- Jaeden Paige Boadilla as Grace
- Leanne Best as Katherine
- David Hayman as Mr Garrett

== Reception ==
On the review aggregator website Rotten Tomatoes, 95% of 56 critics' reviews are positive. The website's consensus reads: "Dispensing social commentary shrouded in gothic dread, Raging Grace smartly balances its messaging against vivid atmosphere and absorbing character-driven drama." Metacritic, which uses a weighted average, assigned the film a score of 65 out of 100, based on 11 critics, indicating "generally favorable" reviews.

Writing for RogerEbert.com, Monica Castillo gave the film 4 stars out of 4, saying that "in his feature debut, writer and director Paris Zarcilla proves he is a master storyteller." Matthew Jackson of Paste gave the film a positive review, calling it "a satisfying and remarkable debut from a new horror voice." Trevor Johnston of Time Out gave the film 3 stars out of 5, calling it "mostly disarmingly effective" and praising it for being "driven by an authentic need to find a fresh angle on representing an undervalued cultural heritage."
