= This Closeness =

2023 film directed by Kit Zauhar

- Poster
- Directed by: Kit Zauhar
- Screenplay by: Kit Zauhar
- Produced by: Ani Schroeter
- Starring: Zane Pais; Kit Zauhar; Jessie Pinnick; Ian Edlund
- Cinematography: Kayla Wolf
- Edited by: Brian Kinnes
- Production companies: Neon Heart Productions; Modern Pleasures; Discordia; Nice Dissolve
- Release dates: March 10, 2023 (SXSW); June 7, 2024 (Theatrical); July 3, 2024 (MUBI)
- Running time: 89 minutes
- Country: United States

This Closeness is a 2023 American comedy drama film written and directed by Kit Zauhar. The film stars Zauhar and Zane Pais as a young couple on vacation renting a room from a socially awkward host played by Ian Edlund.

== Premise ==
Tessa, an ASMR content creator, joins her journalist boyfriend Ben in Philadelphia for his high school reunion. The couple rent a room from Adam, a shy young man who has opened his apartment for homestays to meet new people. The awkward introduction of Adam to the couple's dynamic is compounded with Ben and Tessa gain the sense that Adam is attracted to Tessa; the couple become convinced that Adam is especially attracted to Asian women like Tessa, who is biracial, when Adam brings home Kristen, who is also Asian.

== Cast ==
- Kit Zauhar as Tessa
- Zane Pais as Ben, a journalist who is dating Tessa
- Ian Edlund as Adam, who is hosting Tessa and Ben for a weekend
- Kate Williams as Kristen, Adam's date
- Jessie Pinnick as Lizzy

== Production ==
The initial runtime of the film was projected at two hours and twenty minutes, but Zauhar and her editor Brian Kinnes chose to omit several scenes for a final runtime under ninety minutes.

== Release ==
This Closeness debuted in the Narrative Spotlight section of the 2023 South by Southwest Film & TV Festival. The film was acquired for a limited theatrical run beginning June 7, 2024 by Factory 25 and was released on MUBI on July 3.

== Reception ==
=== Accolades ===
Award	Ceremony date	Category	Recipient(s)	Result	Ref.
South by Southwest	19 March 2023	Narrative Spotlight	This Closeness	Nominated	
Seattle International Film Festival	21 May 2023	New American Cinema Competition Special Jury Prize	This Closeness	Won	
Champs-Élysées Film Festival	27 June 2023	American Independent Feature Films Competition	This Closeness	Nominated	
Valencia International Film Festival Cinema Jove	1 July 2023	Youth Jury Award for Best Film	This Closeness	Won	
Philadelphia Film Festival	29 October 2023	Best Local Feature	This Closeness	Nominated	
