= City of Gold (2015 film) =

- Film poster
- Directed by: Laura Gabbert
- Produced by: Laura Gabbert; Holly Becker; Braxton Pope; Jamie Wolf; Andrea Lewis; Lara Rabinovitch
- Cinematography: Jerry Henry; Goro Toshima
- Edited by: William Haugse; Greg King
- Music by: Bobby Johnston
- Distributed by: IFC Films/Sundance Selects
- Release date: January 27, 2015
- Running time: 91 minutes
- Country: United States
- Language: English

City of Gold is a 2015 documentary film directed by American filmmaker Laura Gabbert. The film profiles food critic Jonathan Gold and the influence of his writing on Los Angeles culture and beyond.

== Release ==
City of Gold debuted at the 2015 Sundance Film Festival and was released the following year by IFC Films/Sundance Selects in theaters and on DVD.

== Reception ==
Akiva Gottlieb of the Los Angeles Times wrote that City of Gold "Offers an almost utopian vision of urban life in which good food can temporarily transcend borders of race, class and gender." Rolling Stone's Peter Travers stated "In search of fresh culinary treasures, Gold travels the hidden corners of a too-familiar city and we get to fall in love with L.A. again." According to Melena Ryzik of The New York Times, "The documentary does as much to demystify and yet romanticize Los Angeles as any Chandler novel." Conor Bateman of 4:3 Film summed up that City of Gold is "A Love Letter to the art of discovery."
