= King of the Ants =

2003 film

- Theatrical release poster
- Directed by: Stuart Gordon
- Screenplay by: Charlie Higson
- Based on: King of the Ants by Charlie Higson
- Produced by: Duffy Hecht; David Michael Latt
- Starring: Chris McKenna; Kari Wuhrer; George Wendt; Daniel Baldwin
- Cinematography: Mac Ahlberg
- Edited by: David Michael Latt
- Music by: Bobby Johnston
- Production companies: Anthill Productions; The Asylum; Hecht Productions; Red Hen Productions
- Distributed by: The Asylum
- Release date: June 11, 2003 (SIFF)
- Running time: 101 minutes
- Country: United States
- Language: English

King of the Ants is a 2003 American independent neo-noir crime thriller film directed by Stuart Gordon, written by Charlie Higson, and starring Chris McKenna, Kari Wuhrer, George Wendt, Vernon Wells, and Daniel Baldwin. It was adapted from Higson's 1992 novel of the same name, and was one of the first films produced by The Asylum.

== Plot ==
Sean Crawley is a young man struggling to make ends meet in suburban Los Angeles. "Duke" Wayne introduces Sean to his boss, Ray Matthews, a shady real estate developer. Ray initially hires Sean to follow Eric Gatley, an accountant who has been investigating Ray's company, but later offers him $13,000 to kill Eric. Although ambivalent, Sean breaks into Eric's house and beats him to death. Ray refuses to pay Sean and has him abducted when he protests.

At Ray's secluded farm, it emerges that he never had any intention of paying Sean for the killing. Sean then reveals that he has hidden evidence stolen from Eric that will incriminate Ray in the murder and other crimes. Ray and his men torture Sean by hitting him with an iron golf club to his head, attempting to obtain the location of the file, albeit unsuccessfully. Failing that, they spend several weeks beating Sean, intending to turn him into a vegetable in an effort to destroy his memory, over which he has nightmares about Eric's wife, Susan, whom he had met earlier while scoping their house, at night, that become more monstrous over time.

Eventually, Sean kills Duke by biting a chunk out of his neck, and escapes, initially with the help of his friend George, who followed Ray to his house in his work van, before he kicks him out after Sean, in a belligerent state, said he liked killing the people he killed, and finds his way to a homeless shelter where he befriends Susan, who is oblivious to his role in her husband's death. She nurses him back to health, they become lovers, and he moves into her house. Susan eventually recognizes Sean after remembering the time he was over at their place, finds Sean's incriminating files, and realizes his role in Eric's death; enraged, she attacks him, and Sean accidentally kills her while defending himself.

Having lost what he saw as his chance for redemption in Susan, Sean returns to Ray's farm to engage in a campaign of revenge. He disables Ray's henchmen Carl and Beckett, then douses Ray in gasoline and sets him on fire before turning the gas stove on. He stages the scene to make it appear that the fire was accidental, then walks away from the house as it explodes with everyone inside.

== Cast ==
- Chris L. McKenna as Sean Crawley
- George Wendt as Duke Wayne
- Daniel Baldwin as Ray Mathews
- Kari Wuhrer as Susan Gatley
- Timm Sharp as George
- Shuko Akune as Meade Park
- Vernon Wells as Beckett
- Lionel Mark Smith as Carl
- Ron Livingston as Eric Gatley (uncredited)

== Production ==
It is based on a novel by writer Charlie Higson, who also wrote the screenplay for the film. Actor George Wendt read the novel and contacted Higson about a film adaptation. Higson replied that there had been interest in the past but nothing had materialized. Wendt then brought the novel to Stuart Gordon's attention, and they were able to get the project off the ground. Wendt and Gordon had previously worked together in Chicago theater. It took seven years to find a company willing to produce the film. The Asylum was the only studio willing to commit to such a dark and violent story. This was the first film that The Asylum produced; they had previously worked exclusively as a distributor.

== Release ==
King of the Ants premiered at the 2003 Seattle International Film Festival.

The film was released on DVD by DEJ Productions on June 29, 2004. On July 5, that same year it was released by Mosaic. The film was later released by First Look Pictures on August 24, 2005. First Look would release a SteelBook edition of the film on October 6, 2009.

== Reception ==
Ken Eisner of Variety wrote that although the film has clever writing, a veteran director, and "starts out engagingly enough", it can't decide whether it is a horror film, neo-noir caper, or psychological thriller. Marjorie Baumgarten of The Austin Chronicle rated it 3/5 stars and called it "an intriguing indie effort" that is "refreshingly unpredictable". Ain't It Cool News praised the film, calling it director Gordon's best film. The reviewer praised the film's acting, intelligent approach, and difference in comparison to the director's previous works.

Ross Williams of Film Threat rated it 4/5 stars and called it Gordon's best film since Re-Animator. Mike Pinsky of DVD Verdict wrote that the first half of the film has promise, but "the second half of the script is a complete mess."
