= Pay or Die (2023 film) =

- Directed by: Rachael Dyer; Scott Alexander Ruderman
- Produced by: Rachael Dyer; Scott Alexander Ruderman; Yael Melamede
- Cinematography: Scott Alexander Ruderman
- Edited by: William Edward Rogers
- Music by: T. Griffin
- Production companies: Post Road Features; Salty Features; Artemis Rising Foundation; Sons of Rigor
- Distributed by: MTV Documentary Films
- Release dates: March 11, 2023 (SXSW); November 1, 2023
- Running time: 90 minutes
- Country: United States
- Language: English

Pay or Die is a 2023 American documentary film, directed and produced by Scott Alexander Ruderman and Rachael Dyer. It explores three families struggling to afford insulin, and their attempts to make a difference. Sarah Silverman serves as an executive producer.

It had its world premiere at South by Southwest on March 11, 2023, and was released in a limited release on November 1, 2023, by MTV Documentary Films, prior to streaming on Paramount+ on November 14, 2023.

== Plot ==
Three families struggle to afford insulin, one family battles lawmakers in Minnesota to regulate insulin prices, following the death of their son who was unable to afford the medication, a mother and daughter rebuilding their lives after spending their money on insulin, and a young adult diagnosed with Type 1 diabetes amidst the COVID-19 pandemic.

== Production ==
In February 2022, it was announced Rachael Dyer and Scott Alexander Ruderman would direct the film, with Sarah Silverman set to executive produce.

== Release ==
The film had its world premiere at the 2023 South by Southwest Film & TV Festival on March 11, 2023. Shortly after, MTV Documentary Films acquired distribution rights to the film. It was released in a limited release on November 1, 2023, by MTV Documentary Films, prior to streaming on Paramount+ on November 14, 2023.

== Reception ==
On the review aggregator website Rotten Tomatoes, 91% of 11 critics' reviews are positive, with an average rating of 6.9/10.
