= No Impact Man =

- Promotional film poster
- Directed by: Laura Gabbert; Justin Schein
- Produced by: Eden Wurmfeld; Laura Gabbert
- Starring: Colin Beavan; Michelle Conlin
- Edited by: William Haugse; Matthew Martin
- Music by: Bobby Johnston
- Distributed by: Oscilloscope
- Release date: September 4, 2009
- Running time: 93 minutes
- Country: United States
- Language: English
- Box office: $116,349

No Impact Man is a 2009 American documentary film directed by Laura Gabbert and Justin Schein, based on the book by Colin Beavan. The film, which premiered on September 4, 2009, follows Colin Beavan and his family during their year-long experiment to have zero impact on the environment. The film mostly takes place in New York City.

== Reception ==
On the review aggregator website Rotten Tomatoes, 83% of 48 critics' reviews are positive. The website's consensus reads: "Half enviro-saving doc, half publicity stunt, No Impact Man is inspiring and fun to both casual activists and hardcore recyclers." Metacritic, which uses a weighted average, assigned the film a score of 66 out of 100, based on 22 critics, indicating "generally favorable" reviews.

John Anderson of Variety wrote, "Proof that 'eco' and 'entertainment' aren't mutually exclusive, No Impact Man may be a socially progressive, environmentally conscious film, but it goes down far easier than, say, an all-natural, fiber-enriched peanut butter sandwich without a glass of soy milk."

== See also ==
- Appropriate technology
- Carbon footprint
- Carbon neutrality
- Conservation (ethic)
- Individual and political action on climate change
- Non-carbon economy
- Sustainable living
