= Stuck (2007 film) =

- Theatrical release poster
- Directed by: Stuart Gordon
- Screenplay by: John Strysik
- Story by: Stuart Gordon
- Produced by: Jay Firestone; Ken Gord; Stuart Gordon; Robert Katz; Zenon Yunko
- Starring: Mena Suvari; Stephen Rea
- Cinematography: Denis Maloney
- Edited by: Andy Horvitch
- Music by: Bobby Johnston
- Production companies: Amicus Entertainment; Prodigy Pictures; Grana Pictures
- Distributed by: THINKFilm; Image Entertainment
- Release dates: August 1, 2007 (Fantasy Film Festival); May 30, 2008 (United States)
- Running time: 85 minutes
- Countries: Canada; United States; United Kingdom
- Language: English
- Box office: $146,154

Stuck is a 2007 black comedy thriller film directed by Stuart Gordon and starring Mena Suvari and Stephen Rea, with a plot inspired by the true story of the murder of Gregory Glenn Biggs. The film premiered on May 21, 2007 at the Cannes Film Market. It was later adapted in Bollywood as Accident on Hill Road starring Celina Jaitley in Mena Suvari's role. It was the final film Gordon directed before his death.

== Plot ==
In Providence, Rhode Island, Thomas "Tom" Bardo (Stephen Rea) is having a particularly bad day; not only has his unemployment run out, but he has also been evicted from his apartment. Retirement-home caregiver Brandi Boski (Mena Suvari), who is potentially up for a promotion at work, celebrates with a night of drinking and MDMA before driving home. On the way, Brandi hits Tom with her car and he becomes trapped in her windshield. Afraid of being arrested, Brandi continues to drive home with the promise that she will get Tom help. However, believing that reporting the accident will destroy her life, she opts to take a taxi to work the next day, leaving him to die slowly in her garage. When Tom realizes this, he painfully tries to escape.

Tom does everything he can to get out of the situation. He beeps the horn and pulls himself from a shard of glass. Eventually, he is able to get a young neighbor boy's attention, but the boy's family, who are illegal immigrants, don't want to get involved. Later, a dog being walked by his owner comes across Tom, but the owner mistakenly thinks the dog has gotten into the garbage.

Brandi enlists the help of her boyfriend, Rashid (Russell Hornsby), in an attempt to kill and dispose of Tom. Rashid is a drug dealer who claims that he's disposed of people before. Meanwhile, Tom is able to pull himself from the windshield, but before he can escape from the garage, Rashid and Brandi restrain him. They go back into Brandi's house and decide to kill Tom and hide the evidence by burning both Tom's corpse and the car.

Rashid returns to the garage and prepares to shoot the apparently unconscious Tom with a revolver. But Tom, secretly awake, manages to stab Rashid through the eye with a concealed pen, killing him. During the brawl, a shot is discharged from the gun, prompting Brandi to investigate. Tom tries to start the car, but Brandi enters the garage before he is able to do so. Tom knocks Brandi over and limps out of the garage towards the street, taking Rashid's gun with him.

Brandi pursues Tom, wielding a hammer from the garage. Tom pleads with Brandi to stay back, not wanting to fire on her, but she subdues him with the hammer. She drags Tom back to the garage and, in a panic, begins dousing the room with gasoline. She hopes that the police will conclude that Tom broke in, attacked Rashid, and accidentally became engulfed in flames while trying to burn the garage down. However, Tom is able to sneak back into the car, start it and drive forwards, pinning Brandi against the back of the garage.

Brandi begs for help, while Tom steps out of the car and lights a match. He asks why she didn't help him, and Brandi says she doesn't know and continues to plead for her life. Tom decides to spare Brandi and extinguishes the match. Brandi suddenly produces Rashid's revolver and fires on Tom, who ducks beside the car. A stray bullet ignites the gasoline, setting Brandi aflame. As she screams in pain, burning to death, Tom struggles to the front of the garage and is able to open the door. Tom stumbles out onto the driveway and collapses as neighbors surround him, alerted by the fire. Tom is helped away and turns to look back at the burning garage, where Brandi's screaming has ceased.

== Cast ==
- Mena Suvari as Brandi Boski
- Stephen Rea as Thomas "Tom" Bardo
- Russell Hornsby as Rashid
- Rukiya Bernard as Tanya
- Carolyn Purdy-Gordon as Petersen
- Lionel Mark Smith as Sam
- Wayne Robson as Binckley
- R.D. Reid as Manager
- John Dunsworth as Cabbie
- Patrick McKenna as Joe

== Production ==
The film marks the first production under the newly reformed Amicus Productions. It was filmed in Saint John, New Brunswick, Canada.

== Release ==
The film premiered May 21, 2007 at the Cannes Film Market. It was also shown at the Toronto International Film Festival, Atlantic Film Festival, Edmonton International Film Festival, Wisconsin Film Festival, Philadelphia Film Festival, and RiverRun International Film Festival. Stuck opened in limited release in the United States on May 30, 2008.

== Reception ==
Stuck received generally favorable reviews from critics. The review aggregator website Rotten Tomatoes reported that 73% of critics gave the film positive reviews, based on 91 reviews. The website's consensus reads, "Steeped in gallows humor, Stuck is a taut, tense examination of a tragic accident." Metacritic reported the film had an average score of 61 out of 100, based on 25 reviews.

Stephen Holden of The New York Times called the film a "grim, expert little thriller." Holden compared the character Tom Bardo and the setting of the film to director Stuart Gordon's 2005 film Edmond (in which Suvari also appeared). Holden wrote "Stuck, while not strictly a horror film, is steeped in gore and carries a seam of mocking gallows humor as relentless as that of Sweeney Todd." Holden said the film "is exceptional because its characters feel like real people plunged into a disorienting situation in which they behave like monsters." Ken Fox of TV Guide gave the film 3 stars out of 4, and called the film "a drum-tight, extremely grisly thriller. And odd as it may sound given the subject matter, it's also surprisingly funny." Fox praised the script by John Strysik, calling it "blackly funny" and said "Rea does quite a bit with a role that keeps him face down and bleeding like a stuck pig for most of the movie, but this is definitely Suvari's show."

Robert Wilonsky of The Village Voice said "Stuck is both darkly comic and disgusting; the name alone reduces the crime to a sick joke." Joe Leydon of Variety said "Stuck is ingeniously nasty and often shockingly funny as it incrementally worsens a very bad situation, then provides a potent payoff..." Leydon called it a "darkly comical farce" and said it could generate a cult following through a "carefully calibrated theatrical rollout, especially if it generates want-to-see buzz in key regions of the blogosphere." Leydon called the script "crafty" and the director Stuart Gordon "establishes a heightened-reality tone of bleak hilarity early on." Leydon said the film "overall has the look and feel of a tawdry B-movie. Whether that's due to budgetary limitations or artistic inspiration, it serves the material well."

J.R. Jones of the Chicago Reader said "As the title of this splatter comedy by writer-director Stuart Gordon (Re-Animator) indicates, [Tom]'s like a bug stuck to her windshield, and that's about the level of humanity and insight one can expect here."

The film appeared on some critics' top ten lists of the best films of 2008. Nathan Rabin of The A.V. Club named it the 7th best film of 2008, and Scott Tobias of The A.V. Club named it the 10th best film of 2008.

In the book The New American Crime Film, scholar Matthew Sorrento describes the film as using "widespread media fodder to create a tale of isolated torment that is, like Edmond, minimalistic and absurdist[.... It] moves beneath moral judgment to depict the humanity of those caught in tough spots."

== Box office ==
The film opened in limited release in the United States on May 30, 2008 and grossed $8,844 in 2 theaters. It was shown in as many as 16 theaters as of June 6, 2008.

The film grossed $146,154 worldwide — $67,505 in the United States and $78,649 in other territories.

== Awards and nominations ==
Director Stuart Gordon won the Silver Raven award at the Brussels International Festival of Fantasy Film and also the Staff Prize for Narrative Feature at the San Francisco Indiefest for the film.

== Inspiration ==
Stuck was based on the true story of Chante Jawan Mallard, a Texas nursing assistant who received 50 years in prison for the murder of a homeless man, Gregory Biggs. She hit Biggs, while driving impaired, and he became lodged in her windshield after the collision. She drove home, parked her car in the garage with Biggs still lodged, alive and conscious, in the windshield. While she did go out to apologize to Biggs, she failed to call for any assistance and left him to bleed to death. Mallard and two accomplices then took the body to a local park, where it was discovered. She was arrested four months later after bragging about the incident at a party. The Fort Worth Medical Examiner and other experts all testified at the trial that basic first responder care would have saved Biggs' life.

The film attracted some criticism for whitewashing. White actor Mena Suvari, in cornrows, plays a character based on Chante Jawan Mallard, who is of African American descent.

== See also ==
- 2007 in film
- Creepshow 2, a 1987 movie with a scene, The Hitch-hiker, in which a similar vehicular homicide was portrayed where the zombie-like victim followed the driver all the way back to her garage.
- A significant plotline in season 2 of the television series Fargo surrounds the death of a character after becoming embedded in the windshield of a car during a hit-and-run accident.
