= Food and Country =

2023 documentary film

- Film poster
- Directed by: Laura Gabbert
- Produced by: Laura Gabbert; Caroline Libresco; Paula P. Manzanedo; Ruth Reichl; Lisa Remington
- Starring: Grant Achatz; Reem Assil; Eric Deeble
- Cinematography: Jerry Henry; Martina Radwan
- Edited by: Philip Owens
- Music by: Ryan Rumery
- Production companies: Foothill Productions; Real Lava
- Distributed by: Greenwich Entertainment
- Release dates: January 23, 2023 (Sundance); October 2, 2024
- Running time: 100 minutes
- Country: United States
- Language: English
- Box office: $11,052

Food and Country is a 2023 American documentary film directed by Laura Gabbert, which explores how the COVID pandemic impacted American small farmers and independent restaurants.

The film premiered at the Sundance Film Festival on January 23, 2023, and was released in the United States on October 2, 2024.

== Release ==
The film first premiered at the Sundance Film Festival on January 23, 2023, and later at the Thessaloniki Documentary Festival on March 5, 2023, South by Southwest on March 13, 2023, the Cleveland Film Festival on March 31, 2023, the Minneapolis St. Paul International Film Festival on April 26, 2023, the Hot Docs International Film Festival on April 28, 2023, the Seattle International Film Festival in May 2023, the Nantucket Film Festival on June 22, 2023, and the Philadelphia Film Festival on October 25, 2023. On August 21, 2024, Greenwich Entertainment acquired the distribution rights to the film, which was released on October 2, 2024.

== Reception ==
=== Box office ===
In the United States, the film made $4,037 from two theaters in its opening weekend.

=== Critical response ===
On the review aggregator website Rotten Tomatoes, 67% of 18 critics' reviews are positive, with an average rating of 7/10.

In a positive review, Lisa Kennedy of Variety wrote that the film is "brimming with likable interviewees".
