= E/R =

American television comedy series (1984–85)

- Genre: Sitcom
- Based on: E/R by Organic Theater Company
- Developed by: Bernie Orenstein; Saul Turteltaub
- Written by: Bernie Orenstein; Saul Turteltaub; Bruce A. Young
- Directed by: Peter Bonerz
- Starring: Elliott Gould; Mary McDonnell; Conchata Ferrell; Lynne Moody; Shuko Akune; Bruce A. Young; Corinne Bohrer; Luis Ávalos
- Opening theme: "E/R" performed by Lou Rawls
- Composer: Jimmy Webb
- Country of origin: United States
- Original language: English
- No. of seasons: 1
- No. of episodes: 22

Production
- Executive producers: Bernie Orenstein; Saul Turtletaub
- Producer: Eve Brandstein
- Camera setup: Multi-camera
- Running time: 30 minutes
- Production company: Embassy Television

Original release
- Network: CBS
- Release: September 16, 1984 – February 27, 1985

E/R is an American sitcom that aired on CBS from September 16, 1984, to February 27, 1985.

Developed from the play of the same name created and produced by the Organic Theater Company under the direction of Stuart Gordon and conceived by Dr. Ronald Berman, the series was produced by Embassy Television and lasted a single season. Shuko Akune and Bruce A. Young reprised their roles from the original Organic Theater Company production of the play.

Two members of the show's cast, George Clooney and Mary McDonnell, later appeared in NBC's drama ER.

== Synopsis ==
The main setting is the emergency room (E/R) of a fictional Clark Street Hospital in Chicago, Illinois; the stories are centered upon the happenings in the ER and the lives of the doctors who work there. Principal characters include Dr. Howard Sheinfeld (played by Elliott Gould)—a twice divorced ear, nose, and throat specialist who moonlights at the hospital to keep up with his alimony payments—and his colleague (and potential romantic interest) Dr. Eve Sheridan (played by Marcia Strassman in the pilot and by Mary McDonnell thereafter).

While essentially a comedy, E/R also contained dramatic elements stemming from its hospital setting. As Tom Shales wrote in The Washington Post, "Microcosmic, teetering on tragedy and concerned with group psychology as M*A*S*H was, E/R mixes black comedy, sick comedy and sudden drama somewhat uneasily but very entertainingly."

== Main characters ==
- Dr. Howard Sheinfeld (Elliott Gould): A twice-divorced otolaryngologist (his wives were named Sheila and Phyllis) and father of two (David and Jenny, his children with Sheila), who—in order to keep up his alimony payments to said ex-wives—works long hours at Clark Street Hospital's emergency room. Despite his joking nature and his constant womanizing, he is a compassionate and well-respected doctor.
- Dr. Eve Sheridan (Marcia Strassman in the pilot; Mary McDonnell thereafter): The head doctor in the ER. Born in a medical family (her father was also a doctor), she takes her job very seriously. She tends to come down hard on Howard for his constant joking and his lack of medical protocol, but she is also concerned for him because he works such long hours in the emergency room with absolutely little or nothing to show for it (since whatever money he makes goes to his ex-wives for alimony). At times she is very strict with her staff, almost to the point of angering them, but she truly does mean well and is a fine doctor. Eventually, Eve was able to let her hair down with the staff and was considered their friend.
- Nurse Joan Thor (Conchata Ferrell): The head nurse in the ER. She is close friends with Howard and, like Eve, worries about him. She has a tough exterior, but a heart of gold. She is often seen talking on the phone to her husband, Bud Thor. Her nephew, Mark "Ace" Kolmar, who is an EMT, was hired to work in the ER as a technician. Thor is diagnosed with Hodgkin's disease late in the series' run.
- Nurse Julie Williams (Lynne Moody): Joan's industrious and efficient assistant. She is kind and good natured. Her aunt and uncle are George and Louise Jefferson from The Jeffersons. She shares an apartment with receptionist Maria Amardo, to help save money.
- Maria Amardo (Shuko Akune): The ER's Filipino-American receptionist. Known for her strict enforcement of the white line rule (her catch-phrase, "Stay back of the white line!!"). She dates Officer Fred Burdock, the beat cop, but is afraid of marriage due to her interracial parents' divorce. Shares an apartment with nurse Julie Williams, to help both of them save money.
- Nurse Cory Smith (Corinne Bohrer): A pediatric nurse who comes to help in the ER when it gets too busy. Is in love with Howard, who only sees her as a colleague, due to his being burned by his two divorces.
- Officer Fred Burdock (Bruce A. Young): The beat cop in the area of Chicago where Clark Street Hospital is located. Dates Maria Amardo, of whom he is insanely jealous, although marriage isn't in the cards due to Maria's fear of divorce. Officer Burdock is also close friends with the rest of the ER staff. Diagnosed with high blood pressure late in the series' run. He did go out once, with Maria's roommate, Julie.

A more complete cast list follows:

Actor	Role	Billing
Elliott Gould	Dr. Howard Sheinfeld	Series regular
Mary McDonnell	Dr. Eve Sheridan	Series regular, played by Marcia Strassman in the pilot
Conchata Ferrell	Head Nurse Joan Thor	Series regular
Lynne Moody	Nurse Julie Williams	Series regular
Corinne Bohrer	Nurse Cory Smith	Series regular, but appears on a recurring basis
Shuko Akune	Maria Amardo	Series regular
Bruce A. Young	Officer Fred Burdock	Series regular
Robert Rockwell	John Harrison, hospital administrator	Recurring
Luis Ávalos	Dr. Thomas Esquivel, another doctor	Recurring
Karen Black	Sheila Sheinfeld, Howard's first wife, mother of David and Jenny.	Recurring
Jeff Doucette	Bert, paramedic	Recurring
George Clooney	Mark "Ace" Kolmar, Thor's nephew and ER technician	Recurring, first appears in episode 14
Jason Alexander	Harold Stickley, hospital administrator, after Harrison	Recurring
Pamela Segall	Jenny Sheinfeld, Howard's daughter by his first marriage, her mother is Sheila.	Recurring
Shirley Prestia	Irene, resident hypochondriac	Recurring
William G. Schilling	Richard, the orderly	Recurring
Patch MacKenzie	Phyllis Sheinfeld, Howard's second wife	Recurring

== Reception ==
The program was canceled after 22 episodes due to low ratings, mainly due to competition from the Top 10 hit The A-Team.

Reruns aired on cable's Lifetime Television from September 5, 1988, to April 24, 1992.

== Episodes ==
No.	Title	Original release date
1	"Pilot: Parts 1 & 2"	September 16, 1984
2	"Pilot: Parts 1 & 2"	September 16, 1984
It's a typical night in the E/R as Dr. Eve Sheridan (Marcia Strassman; pilot only) starts her first night. A young woman comes into the E/R with constipation and gets a big surprise. Meanwhile, Julie's uncle George Jefferson visits. Guest star: Sherman Hemsley
3	"The Sister"	September 18, 1984
Eve's sister Karen comes to discuss plans for their ailing father who is about to be released from the hospital, and Howard asks her to a party being thrown by Cory and the pediatric nurses. Meanwhile, a young boy is admitted who appears to have been shaken and a guy comes into the E/R after chopping off his finger while slicing bread. Guest stars: Dennis Franz, Anne Schedeen
4	"My Way"	September 25, 1984
An elderly former baseball player has pancreatic cancer and wants Howard to end his life by a shot. Meanwhile, Nurse Thor has trouble with her lazy husband, a female patient is not what she seems, a young girl with head pains is brought in by Fred, and Maria gets hold of a smutty book.
5	"Son of Sheinfeld"	October 2, 1984
Howard's son, David (by his second marriage to Phyllis) shows up at the E/R with a friend who has overdosed. Meanwhile, a member of the hospital administration wants Eve to fire Howard to cut costs, and a teen in fatal condition after a motorcycle accident causes Howard reevaluate his relationship with his son. Guest star:: Jonathan Silverman
6	"Save the Last Dance for Me"	October 9, 1984
Eve attempts to get away to attend a law school reunion with an old boyfriend. Howard's ex-wife comes in with big news: she's expecting and she wants to get back together. Guest star: David Faustino
7	"Say It Ain't So"	October 16, 1984
Howard awaits the results of his ex-wife's pregnancy test. Meanwhile, Eve faces a tough situation when she tells a patient's family he'll be OK and then he passes away.
8	"Growing Pains"	October 23, 1984
Howard is bitter that Eve is interviewing candidates for a full-time E/R specialist. Meanwhile, a doctor who retired in 1972 shows up ready for work.
9	"All's Well That Ends"	October 30, 1984
Howard is trying to sell his old practice, and a woman shows up in the E/R with an unexploded bullet in her arm. A teenage girl who is ignored by her parents and had been drinking is treated. Guest stars: Amy Linker, Carolyn Purdy Gordon
10	"Only a Nurse"	November 7, 1984
Nurse Thor quits over Sheridan's refusal to allow her to make minor medical decisions, and Nurse Cory confesses to Howard she's in love with him. Meanwhile, Howard tries to convince Eve to get him a parking spot for his new car. Guest star: Bill Erwin
11	"Sentimental Journey"	November 14, 1984
Howard is dating a 23-year-old aerobics instructor, while Sheridan is attracted to an older Latin gentleman.
12	"Mr. Fix-It"	November 21, 1984
A hectic night sees the E/R visited by Howard and Maria's fathers as well as an injured basketball star. Guest stars: Kevin Peter Hall, Christopher Hewett, Jack Kruschen, Max Wright
13	"A Cold Night in Chicago"	November 28, 1984
A sick boy's parents claim that medical testing would violate their religion, Julie's apartment is burglarized, and an old army buddy whose life he once saved visits Howard. Guest stars: Louis Arquette
14	"Both Sides Now"	December 12, 1984
Howard is being sued for malpractice, but is doubtful about calling Sheridan as a character witness when she refuses to shade the truth a little; and Nurse Thor's nephew (George Clooney) is hired as an E/R tech.
15	"The Storm"	December 19, 1984
When a blizzard strikes and the staff's replacements don't arrive, Julie is fired for refusing to continue working past her shift, and Jenny wants to come live with her dad. Guest star: Martha Quinn
16	"Enter Romance"	December 26, 1984
Howard's first wife drops by to discuss Jenny, Ace asks Sheridan out, and the new hospital administrator (Jason Alexander) makes advances to every woman on the staff. Guest star: Karen Black
17	"Brotherly Love"	January 16, 1985
The staff relaxes at their favorite hangout, and a romantic interest develops between Dr. Sheridan and Howard's psychologist brother.
18	"I Raise You"	January 23, 1985
Howard moves his Saturday-night poker game into the E/R, and Ace asks out his daughter Jenny.
19	"Merry Wives of Sheinfeld: Part 1"	January 30, 1985
Both of Howard's ex-wives drop in on a hectic night that sees Nurse Thor worried about her health. Howard's new girlfriend meets his first wife, and the staff tries to help Nurse Thor deal with her discovery that she is seriously ill. Guest star: Karen Black
20	"Merry Wives of Sheinfeld: Part 2"	February 6, 1985
Guest star: Karen Black
21	"All Tied Up"	February 20, 1985
Sheridan loses her life savings because of investment advice from Howard, Maria's boyfriend Fred asks Julie out on a date, and drug thieves strike fear into the staff. Guest star: William Zabka
22	"A Change in Policy"	February 27, 1985
Sheinfeld is conducting private practice in the E/R, and Stickley finds out. Julie is tired of men, and Sheridan yearns for a baby. Guest star: Ron Cey
