= Bobby Johnston =

American film composer

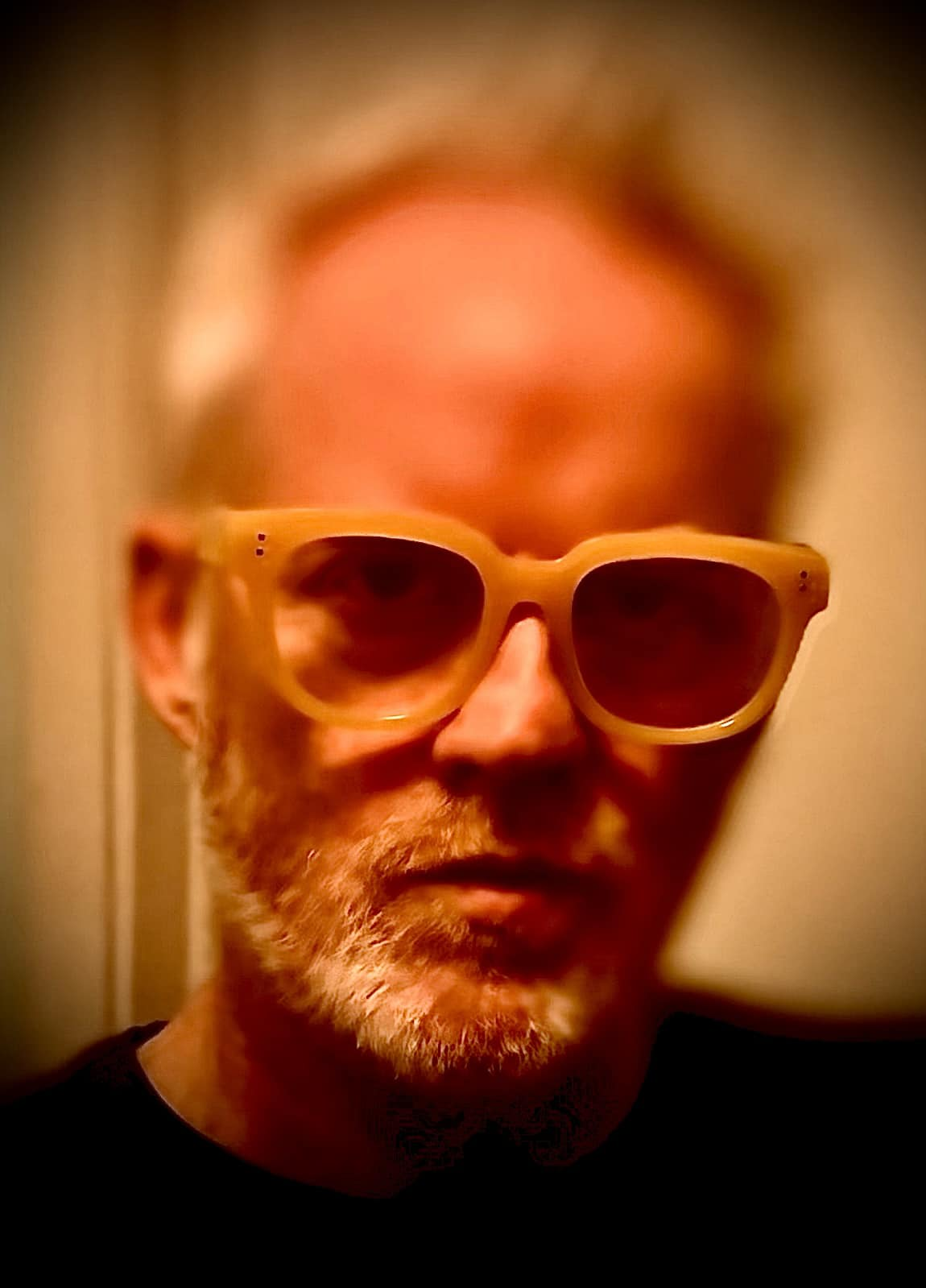
- Johnston in 2023
- Born: 1967 (age 58–59); Olean, New York, U.S.
- Occupations: Film composer; musician; author
- Years active: 2001–present
- Website: www.bobbyjohnston.com

Bobby Johnston (born 1967) is a Los Angeles based film composer, multi-instrumentalist and author. He has composed original music scores for several films, including King of the Ants, Wristcutters: A Love Story, Edmond, Stuck, Mother's Day, Marfa Girl, Bleed Out and City of Gold. He often worked with director Stuart Gordon.

Johnston became known for an unusual approach to film composition, using only acoustic instruments and usually performing every instrument himself. Over his career, he has also brought in many instrumental soloists to accent his sound. Most notable are his scores to Edmond, which featured trumpet player Asdru Sierra from Ozomatli and Crazy Eyes, featuring Big Sir vocalist Lisa Papineau. He also worked with percussionist Greg Ellis on the scores to A New York Heartbeat, Mother's Day and The Barrens.

Johnston was a performer at the Sundance Music Café as part of the 2006 Sundance Film Festival, where Wristcutters: A Love Story had its world premiere.

Johnston's composition I'm Leaving You was featured on the soundtrack to the 2013 film The Lone Ranger.

His music has often been heard on the popular radio program This American Life and has been included on two of the show's greatest hits CDs.

Johnston's first book, "The Saint I Ain't: Stories from Sycamore Street" was published by Fomite Press on February 9, 2021. It is a collection of fictional short stories presented in a hybrid style of poetry and personal narrative.

== Film scores ==
=== Feature films ===
- Death & Taxes (2024)
- Obsession (2019)
- She's Just a Shadow (2019)
- Bleed Out (2018)
- Fallen Star: Finding Home (2016)
- City of Gold (2015)
- Tales of Halloween (2015)
- A New York Heartbeat (2013)
- Marfa Girl (2013)
- The Barrens (2012)
- Crazy Eyes (2012)
- Let Go (2011)
- Mother's Day (2010)
- Cherry (2010)
- Spooner (2009)
- No Impact Man: The Documentary (2009)
- Hotel California (2008)
- Stuck (2007)
- Humble Pie (2007)
- Wristcutters: A Love Story (2006)
- Edmond (2005)
- Guns Before Butter (2005)
- Dead Doll (2004)
- Greener Mountains (2004)
- Scorched (2003)
- King of the Ants (2003)
- A Little Crazy (2003)
- Unprecedented: The 2000 Presidential Election (2002)
- Extra: in The Background of a Dream (2001)

=== Television ===
- How and Why (2014 pilot)
- Fear Itself (2008) TV Series (Episode "Eater")

=== Short films ===
- Shopping Cart People (2022)
- YO! An Introduction to the US Youth Observer at the UN (2013)
- What Do We Have In Our Pockets? (2013)
- Forward (2007)
- We Are Phamaly (2003)
- Boiler Maker (2003)

== Soundtrack releases ==
- Wristcutters: A Love Story (2026, Complete original score MovieScore Media)
- Death & Taxes (2025, MovieScore Media)
- King of the Ants (2024, limited-edition vinyl LP release, Treasured Films [UK])
- Bleed Out (2019, Milan Records)
- Tales of Halloween (2019, limited-edition vinyl LP release, Burning Witches Records)
- Fallen Star: Finding Home (2018, Milan Records)
- City of Gold (2016, Lakeshore Records)
- Tales of Halloween (2015, Aleph Records)
- No Impact Man: The Documentary (2012, Lakeshore Records)
- Crazy Eyes (2012, Lakeshore Records)
- Mother's Day (2012, Lakeshore Records)
- Fear Itself: Original Score from the Series (2009, Lionsgate Records)
- Wristcutters: A Love Story (2007, Lakeshore Records)
- Extra: in the Background of a Dream/Dead Doll (2007, Citadel Records)
- Edmond (2007, Lakeshore Records)
- King of the Ants (2004, La-La Land Records)

== Books ==
- The Saint I Ain't: Stories from Sycamore Street (2021, Fomite Press)
