= Mustache (film) =

- Release poster
- Directed by: Imran J. Khan
- Written by: Imran J. Khan
- Produced by: Riz Ahmed; Christopher Storer; Christina Won; Jessica Sittig; Tyson Bidner; Josh Senior; Cooper Wehde; Allie Moore
- Starring: Atharva Verma; Alicia Silverstone; Rizwan Manji; Meesha Shafi
- Cinematography: David Robert Jones
- Edited by: Harrison Atkins
- Music by: Dan Romer
- Production company: MakeSay
- Distributed by: Quiver Distribution
- Release dates: March 12, 2023 (SXSW); July 31, 2026 (United States)
- Running time: 83 minutes
- Country: United States
- Language: English

Mustache is a 2023 American comedy drama film written and directed by Imran J. Khan and starring Atharva Verma and Alicia Silverstone.

== Premise ==
In the mid-1990s in Silicon Valley, Ilyas is a 14-year-old Pakistani-American who is forced to leave his private Islamic school to attend a public school. Adding to his struggles is a mustache that he has been growing since he was ten, to his chagrin.

== Cast ==
- Atharva Verma as Ilyas
- Rizwan Manji as Hameed
- Meesha Shafi as Asiya
- Ayana Manji as Yasmeen
- Shaheryar Rana as Musa
- Mojeane Sadr as Sadia
- Alicia Silverstone as Miss Martin
- Melody Cao as Liz
- Krishna Manivannan as Arun
- Hasan Minhaj as Hasan
- Esa as young Ilyas
- Armaan Jawandha as Aasim

== Release ==
The film premiered at 2023 South by Southwest Film & TV Festival on March 12, 2023. Quiver Distribution released the film digitally on July 31, 2026.

== Reception ==
On review aggregation website Rotten Tomatoes, 100% of eight critics' reviews are positive, with an average rating of 6.9/10. Metacritic, which uses a weighted average, assigned the film a score of 66 out of 100, based on five critics, indicating "generally favorable" reviews.

Mimi Calzada of The Daily Texan gave the film a positive review and wrote, "Mustache makes for an outstanding directorial feature debut from Imran Khan, which hugely benefits from Verma’s charming and endearing performance. Easily relatable, laugh-out-loud funny and downright delightful, Mustache solidifies itself as one of the best films in the SXSW 2023 lineup."

Justin Lowe of The Hollywood Reporter also gave the film a positive review and wrote, "A religion-themed comedy can be a tricky proposition, even if the tone is predominantly respectful, but Khan strikes a satisfying balance between satire and deference that’s enjoyable without excessively pushing boundaries."

The film won the Audience Award in the Narrative Feature competition at South by Southwest.
