= Crazy Eyes (film) =

- Directed by: Adam Sherman
- Written by: Adam Sherman; Dave Reeves; Rachel Hardisty
- Produced by: Hagai Shaham
- Starring: Lukas Haas; Madeline Zima; Jake Busey
- Cinematography: Sharone Meir
- Edited by: Sam Bauer
- Music by: Bobby Johnston
- Release dates: March 11, 2012 (SXSW); July 6, 2012 (United States)
- Running time: 98 minutes
- Country: United States
- Language: English
- Budget: $10 million
- Box office: $6,106 (USA)

Crazy Eyes is a 2012 independent film co-written and directed by Adam Sherman.

== Plot ==
Zack is a young, divorced father who starts to develop romantic feelings towards his friend Rebecca, whom he refers to as "Crazy Eyes". He spends a lot of time at a bar run by his best friend Dan Drake and hanging out with Autumn. As he pursues a sexual relationship with Rebecca, Zack grows increasingly aware of the importance of his son's role in his life amidst the failing health of his own father.

== Cast ==
Actor	Role
Lukas Haas	Zach
Madeline Zima	Rebecca
Jake Busey	Dan Drake
Tania Raymonde	Autumn
Ray Wise	Father
Ned Bellamy	Bob
Valerie Mahaffey	Mo

== Critical reception ==
From Geoff Henao of Flixist:

The problem with Crazy Eyes is that it's just too real. Because of this, it's a bit uncomfortable to watch. The best way to describe it is that there isn't any "movie magic" to save it; that is to say, there aren't any normal movie thematics or elements that would influence the plot to heighten the protagonist's likability... The end result is just messy and bad. Much like a long day of drinking, Crazy Eyes results in a horrible hangover you regret ever putting yourself through.
