= João Gonzalez =

Portuguese film director

- Born: February 11, 1996 (age 30); Porto
- Citizenship: Portuguese
- Occupations: Director, animator, illustrator
- Known for: Ice Merchants

João Gonzalez (born February 11, 1996) is a Portuguese film director and animator based in Porto. He is mostly known for writing and directing the multi-award-winning short film Ice Merchants, which premiered and was awarded at Cannes Film Festival the same year. On January 24, 2023, "Ice Merchants" became the first Portuguese production to ever receive an Academy Award nomination.

== Career ==
Gonzalez did a Multimedia Arts BA at ESMAD in Porto, where he graduated in 2017, specialising in the field of animation. Recipient of a scholarship from the Calouste Gulbenkian Foundation, he did a Masters of Arts at the Royal College of Art (UK), from which he graduated in 2020. As of January 2023, he works as a director and animator in Porto, at the COLA animation collective. He is also a composer, working on the original scores of his films.

== Filmography ==
- The Voyager (2017)
- Nestor (2019)
- Ice Merchants (2022)

== Recognition ==
His first film and final BA project The Voyager received the International New Talent Award at the BFI Future Film Festival and Best Student Film awards at CINANIMA. His Master's film "Nestor" received the António Gaio Award at Cinanima and Best Student Film Award at the Quirino Awards. His latest film, Ice Merchants, was shortlisted and nominated for the 95th Academy Awards and received a nomination for Best European Short Film at the 2022 European Film Awards.

Gonzalez is the first Portuguese animation filmmaker to be awarded at Festival de Cannes, where his film Ice Merchants won the Jury Prize for Best Short film, in competition at the Critics Week. The film has received 9 Oscar Qualifying Awards, including the Golden Hugo for Best Animation Short Film at the Chicago International Film Festival and the Best Animation Short Film Award at the Melbourne International Film Festival.
