= Colin Beavan =

Environmentalist blogger

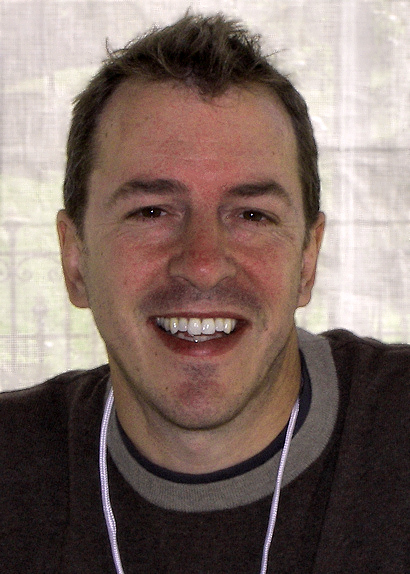
- Colin Beavan at the 2009 Texas Book Festival
- Born: 1963 (age 62–63)
- Children: Isabella
- Writing career
- Genre: Non-fiction
- Subjects: History, environment
- Notable works: No Impact Man; Operation Jedburgh
- Website: colinbeavan.com

Colin Beavan (born 1963) is an American non-fiction writer and internet blogger noted for recording the attempts of his family to live a "zero impact" lifestyle in New York City for one year.

== Zero impact experiment ==
The rules of the experiment included: producing no trash, save for compost, purchasing no goods except for food grown within a 250-mile radius, using no carbon-based transportation, and using no paper products, including toilet paper. He and his family are the subject of a documentary, No Impact Man: The Documentary. A book about the year-long experiment was released in September 2009.

== Writing career ==
Beavan was named one of MSN's Ten Most Influential Men of 2007 and was named an Eco-Illuminator in Elle magazine's 2008 Green Awards. His blog NoImpactMan.com was named one of the world's top 15 environmental websites by Time. He has written for numerous American magazines, including The Atlantic and Wired.

== Political career ==
In May 2012, Beavan announced he would run for the United States House of Representatives seat representing New York's 8th congressional district, running as the nominee of the Green Party. Beavan lost the general election to Hakeem Jeffries, a member of the New York State Assembly.

== Personal life ==
During the filming of No Impact Man, Colin lived in New York City with his wife Michelle and their daughter. They've since divorced, but remain supportive of each other in co-parenting their daughter.

== His books ==
- How to be Alive: a Guide to the Kind of Happiness that Helps the World. New York: Dey St., an imprint of William Morrow Publishers. 2016. ISBN 978-0-0622-3670-8.
- No Impact Man: The Adventures of a Guilty Liberal Who Attempts to Save the Planet and the Discoveries He Makes About Himself and Our Way of Life in the Process. New York: Farrar, Straus and Giroux. 2009. ISBN 978-0-374-22288-8.
- Operation Jedburgh: D-Day and America's First Shadow War. New York: Viking. 2006. ISBN 978-0-670-03762-9.
- Fingerprints: The Origins of Crime Detection and the Murder Case that Launched Forensic Science. New York: Hyperion. 2001. ISBN 978-0-7868-8528-2.

== See also ==
- Conservation (ethic)
- Individual and political action on climate change
- Sustainable living
