= Ek Jagah Apni =

Ek Jagah Apni (एक जगह अपनी, A Place of Our Own) is an Indian film in Hindi about two trans women, Laila and Roshni, who are evicted and looking for a new home. The pair of characters were portrayed by the trans actresses Manisha Soni and Muskan in their acting debut. The film was produced by Ektara Collective, which is based in Bhopal, India. It was screened at the Cannes Film Market, and later premiered at the International Film Festival of Kerala.
