= Tünde Skovrán =

Romanian film director

Tunde Skovran
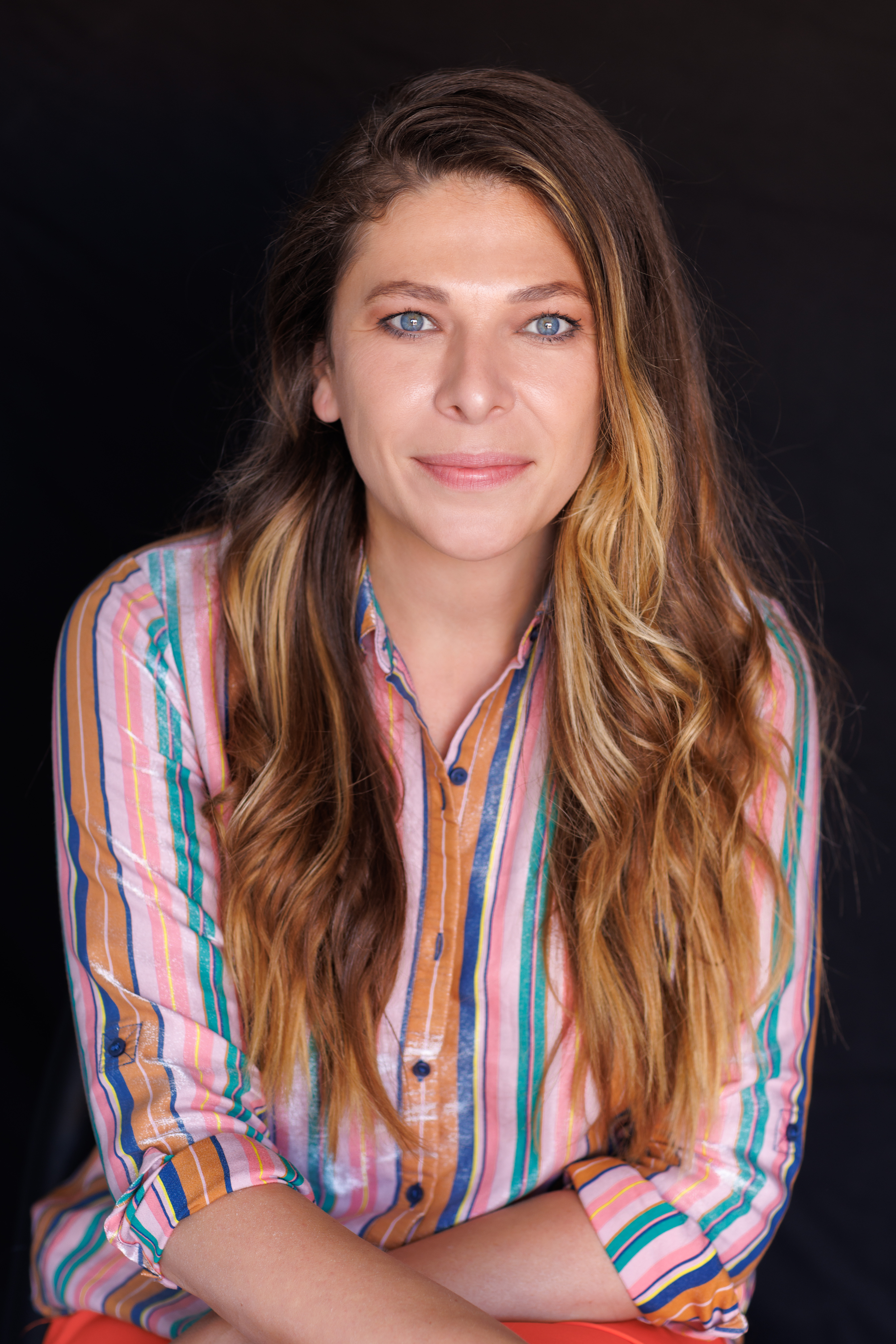
- Born: December 31, 1982 (age 43); Transylvania, Romania
- Education: Babes Bolyai University
- Occupations: Director, Actress, Producer

Tunde Skovran (born December 31, 1982) is a Romanian-born actress, director, and producer known for her work in theater and film. She was born in Baraolt, Transylvania, Romania.

== Early life and education ==
Tunde Skovran was born in Baraolt, Transylvania, Romania. After graduating in 2005 from Babes Bolyai University (Cluj-Napoca, Romania) with a Bachelor degree in Drama, she became a repertoire actress at the prestigious Hungarian State Theatre in Cluj-Napoca.

== Theater career ==
At the Hungarian State Theatre in Cluj-Napoca, Skovran starred in over 30 productions, working with renowned directors such as Robert Woodruff, Alain Timar, Gabor Tompa, and Silviu Purcarete. Her credits include productions under the direction of world-renowned directors such as Robert Woodruff, Alain Timar, Gabor Tompa, and Silviu Purcarete. In 2008, she was nominated for Romania's most prestigious theatre award, the UNITER Award.

== Film career ==
In 2014, Skovran was recognized as one of the most promising young actresses in Central and Eastern Europe. She made her movie debut in "Puzzle" (2013), a Castel Film (Romania) and Double 4 Studios (U.S.) production, for which she was awarded Best Actress in a Lead Role at two international US film festivals. She later participated in the Sarajevo International Film Festival Talent Campus and became a Berlinale Talent alumnus.

Transitioning to Los Angeles, Skovran expanded her expertise by observing at The Actors Studio West. She ventured into film production and founded J.U.S.T. Toys, a theatre production company known for pioneering experimental theater in Los Angeles. The company produced acclaimed productions, one of which opened off-Broadway in 2019 under the direction of Yuri Kordonsky.

== Directorial debut: "Who I Am Not" ==
Skovran made her directorial debut with "Who I Am Not," an astute feature documentary that explores the experiences of the intersex community and challenges societal norms regarding gender identity. The documentary, produced by Andrei Zincã, features executive producers including Marc Smolowitz, Patricia Arquette, M.J. Peckham, Jafta Mekgoe, and Danielle Turkov, among others.

== Accolades and recognition ==
Skovran's contributions to both theater and film have garnered numerous awards and recognition. Her work has been showcased at various international film festivals, with "Who I Am Not" receiving accolades such as the Silver Alexander Award at the Thessaloniki Documentary Festival, the Audience Choice Award for "Best Documentary" at San Francisco's Frameline festival and others. Her work was also recognized by the European Film Awards. In 2024, she became a member of the European Film Academy.
