= Murder of Gregory Glenn Biggs =

2001 vehicular murder case

- Location: Fort Worth, Texas, U.S.
- Date: October 26, 2001
- Attack type: Murder by vehicle, kidnapping
- Victims: Gregory Glenn Biggs, aged 37
- Perpetrator: Chante Jawan Mallard
- Motive: Mallard's fear that she would be arrested for driving while intoxicated
- Verdict: Mallard: Guilty on both counts Jackson and Cleveland: Pleaded guilty
- Convictions: Mallard: Murder; Mallard, Jackson, Cleveland: Tampering with evidence
- Sentence: Mallard: 50 years in prison with the possibility of parole in 2027; Jackson: 10 years in prison Cleveland: 9 years in prison
- Convicted: Chante Jawan Mallard; Clete Deneal Jackson; Herbert Tyrone Cleveland

On October 26, 2001, 25-year-old nursing assistant Chante Jawan Mallard murdered 37-year-old Gregory Glenn Biggs, a homeless man, with her automobile, in Fort Worth, Texas, United States. The force of the crash lodged Biggs into the windshield. Mallard then drove home and left the man lodged in the windshield of her car, parked in her garage. Mr Biggs died of his injuries several hours later. Initially, media reported that Mr Biggs died two to three days later, however this was based on a partially false tip given to police. Mallard was convicted and sentenced to 50 years imprisonment for murder, but will be eligible for parole in 2027.

== Victim ==
Gregory Glenn Biggs was born on August 16, 1964. Although he lived with mental health problems all his adult life, he took care of his son and held a job in construction as a mason. At the moment of the events, Biggs was living in a state of homelessness, but was "on an upswing," according to his mother.

== Murderer ==
Chante Jawan Mallard (born June 22, 1976) is a woman from Fort Worth, Texas. On October 26, 2001, Mallard struck Biggs, a pedestrian, with her Chevrolet Cavalier. At the time, Mallard was believed to have been driving while intoxicated by a combination of marijuana, ecstasy and alcohol.

Mallard then drove home, leaving the injured Biggs stuck in her windshield, and parked her car in her garage. After the accident, Mallard did not notify the police nor did she get Biggs any medical attention, even though she was a nursing assistant at the time. Occasionally, she would return to the garage to check on his status. Forensic medical examiner testimony stated Mr Biggs did not die on impact, likely two to three hours later. Afterwards, Mallard called a male friend, Clete Jackson, for assistance. Mallard, Jackson, and Jackson's cousin Herbert Tyrone Cleveland took the body to a Cobb Park and left it there, even going so far as to set fire to part of the car in an attempt to disguise the evidence. The three were later each convicted on charges of tampering with evidence for this action.

Mallard called her friend Titilisee Fry for help the morning of the accident, but she refused. Fry testified that she told her friend Maranda Daniel, who called the police following an altercation with Mallard. Several months after the incident a search warrant found the vehicle, among other evidence and Mallard was arrested.

== Trial ==
Mallard's trial commenced on June 23, 2003. During the trial, Tarrant County medical examiner Nizam Peerwani testified that, had Mallard taken Biggs to a hospital, he would have recovered from his injuries. Other experts testified that they agreed that Biggs would have survived. "There's not a member of the Fort Worth Fire Department that could not have saved Mr. Biggs's life," testified fire captain Jim Sowder. Mallard was convicted of murder in June 2003, with the 50-year murder sentence and 10-year tampering sentence to run concurrently. She will be eligible for parole in 2027.

== Aftermath ==
A wrongful death lawsuit filed by Biggs's son, Brandon, was settled out of court. He later chose to forgive Mallard and the others involved in his father's murder. "I want to extend my forgiveness to Chante Mallard and let her know that the Mallard family is in my prayers," he said in 2003. In response, convicted murderers from around the country raised $10,000 as a college scholarship and had it presented at a ceremony to Brandon, who at the time was a 20-year-old pastoral ministry sophomore at Southwestern Assemblies of God University in Waxahachie, Texas.

Since finishing his sentence, Clete Denel Jackson, who was imprisoned for helping move Biggs's body, has been in and out of prison on firearms- and drug-related charges. He was set to be released again in late November 2017. Mallard's relationship with Jackson and Cleveland remains unclear. Jackson's lawyer described his client and Mallard as linked romantically, yet relatives of Jackson and Cleveland claim they had never heard of Mallard.

== Media adaptations ==
- Stuck, a 2007 black comedy thriller film directed by Stuart Gordon and starring Mena Suvari and Stephen Rea.
- An episode of CSI: Crime Scene Investigation ("Anatomy of a Lye"), aired May 2, 2002)
- An episode of Law & Order ("Darwinian", aired January 7, 2004)
- The story inspired events in the second season of Fargo, in which Peggy Blumquist (Kirsten Dunst) hits Rye Gerhardt (Kieran Culkin) and drives back home with him stuck through the windshield.
- This story also inspired a scene in the third season of the Fox procedural drama 9-1-1 when Stella (Stephanie Lemelin) hits a homeless man after crashing into him with her car. The man is also lodged in the windshield of her car by the impact. Stella suffers a head injury in the crash and drives around town with the man still stuck in her windshield for nearly two days before firefighter Evan Buckley (Oliver Stark) stops her. Unlike the real-life incident, the man on the show survives his injuries after being rushed to the hospital.

== See also ==
- List of unusual deaths in the 21st century
