= Who I Am Not =

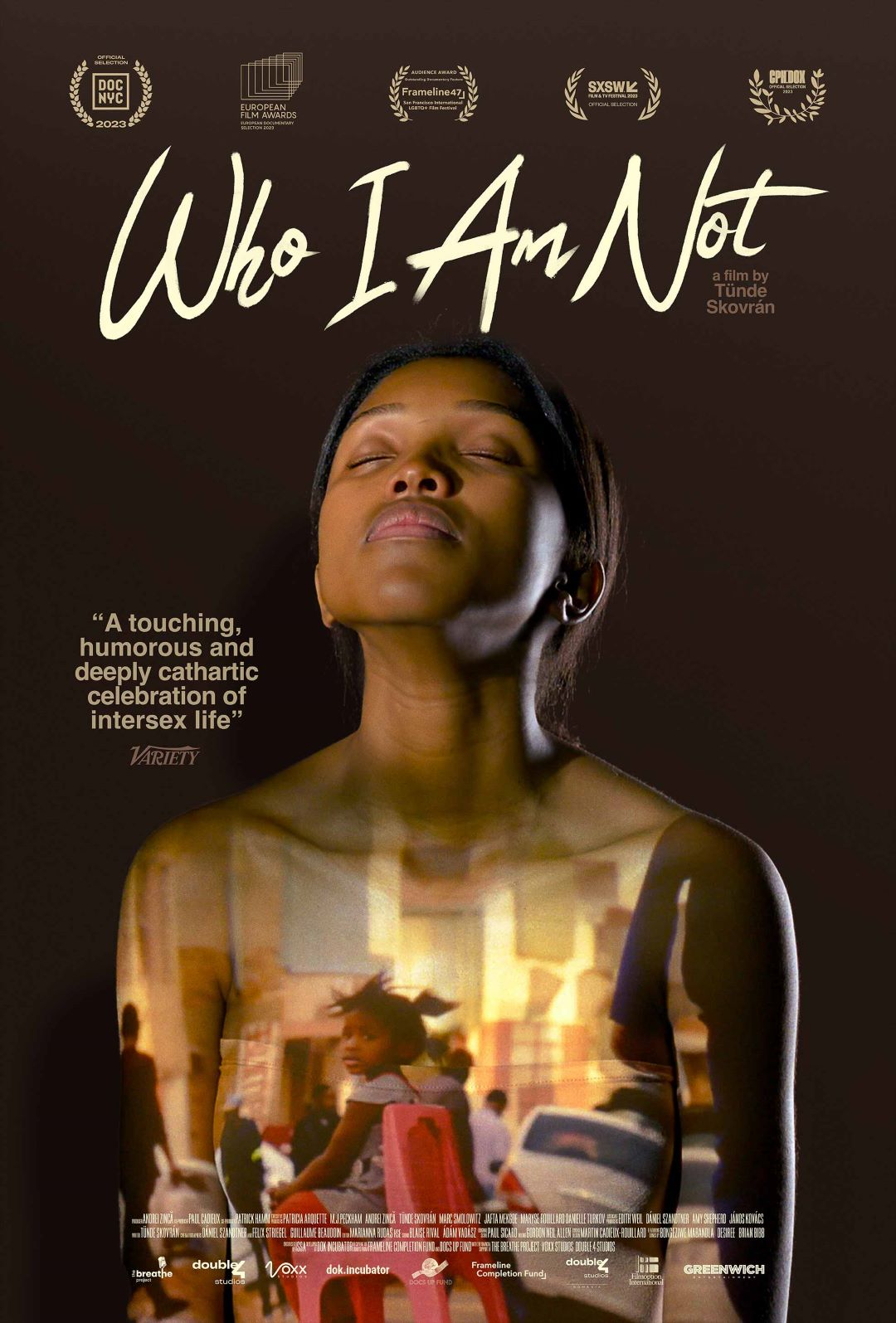
- Directed by: Tunde Skovran
- Written by: Tunde Skovran
- Produced by: Andrei Zinca, Paul Cadieux (co-producer), Patrick Hamm (co-producer)
- Starring: Sharon Rose-Khumalo, Dimakatso Sebidi
- Cinematography: Dániel Szandtner, Felix Striegel, Guillaume Beaudouin
- Edited by: Marianna Rudas
- Distributed by: Greenwich Entertainment
- Release date: 2023
- Running time: 103 min
- Countries: Romania, Canada, South Africa, Germany, United States
- Languages: English, Sesotho, Sepedi, Xhosa, Sezulu, Tzonga, Tswana

Who I Am Not is a 2023 documentary film exploring what it means to be intersex in a binary world, directed by Tunde Skovran. It is her directorial debut. The documentary is produced by Andrei Zincã, and with executive producer Patricia Arquette. Greenwich Entertainment acquired rights to the film.

== Release ==
Who I am Not made its World Premiere at the 2023 Thessaloniki Documentary Festival where it won the International Competition Silver Alexander Award, followed by its North American premiere at SXSW 2023.

In 2024, POV announced the acquisition of Who I am Not from Executive Producer Patricia Arquette.

== Production ==
Who I am Not is a Double 4 Studios România production, in co-production with Filmoption International (Canada), and in association with South Africa. A recipient of grants from The Breathe Project, Docs Up Fund, and Frameline.

== Awards ==
Who I am Not was shortlisted by the European Film Academy for “Best Documentary". It was internationally recognized by a range of prestigious awards. In 2024, it received the SIMA Award for “Best Social Impact Campaign”. The annual SIMA Awards celebrate outstanding achievements in social impact storytelling, selected from over 140 countries.

== Festivals ==
The film was selected for over 70 festivals worldwide:

=== United States ===
SXSW – Documentary Spotlight Section

Doc NYC – US East Coast Tri-States premiere

Frameline

Seattle Queer Film Festival

Wicked Queer: The Boston LGBT Film Festival

Provincetown International Film Festival

Crested Butte Film Festival

Atlanta Out on Film

Reel Affirmations, Washington DC

=== United Kingdom ===
BFI Flare – Centerpiece presentation

Afrika Eye Film Festival

Queer Vision Film Festival

=== Denmark ===
CPH:DOX

MIX Copenhagen

=== Spain ===
DocsBarcelona – International Competition

Bilbao International LGBT Film Festival

=== Poland ===
Krakow Film Festival – International Competition

=== Romania ===
Transilvania International Film Festival– Supernova section

For You International Film Festival

=== Greece ===
Thessaloniki Documentary Festival – World Premiere

Cine Film Festival Greece

=== South Korea ===
Seoul International Pride Film Festival

=== Hungary ===
Verzió International Human Rights Documentary Film Festival

=== New Zealand ===
Doc Edge Festival –Being Oneself section

=== Serbia ===
Beldocs International Documentary Film Festival

=== Sweden ===
Cinema Queer International Film Festival

=== Finland ===
Helsinki International Film Festival – Love & Anarchy

=== Israel ===
TLVFest

=== Germany ===
Queer Scope Hamburg –

Perlen – Queer Film Festival Hannover

Pride Pictures: Karlsruhe Queer Film Days

Queer Film Festival Bremen

Queer Film Festival Bremerhaven

Munich International Queer Film Festival (Munchen)

Queer Filmfest Weiterstadt

QueerFilmFest Rostock

Queerfilmfestival Esslingen

Queerstreifen Münster

Braunschweig International Film Festival

B3 Biennial of the Moving Image

=== Australia ===
Sydney Film Festival

Melbourne Queer Film Festival

=== France ===
Festival de Cinéma de Douarnenez

Chéries-Chéris – Paris LGBTQ+ Film Festival

Les Rencontres de Figra

=== Ireland ===
Gaze LGBTQ Film Festival

Galway Film Fleadh

=== Italy ===
Gender Bender Festival

Rome Independent Film Festival

Festival dei Popoli – International Documentary Film Festival

=== Czech Republic ===
Mezipatra Queer Film Festival

=== Portugal ===
Queer Lisboa – International Queer Film Festival

=== Norway ===
Oslo/Fusion International Film Festival

=== China ===
Hong Kong Lesbian & Gay Film Festival

=== Switzerland ===
Everybody’s Perfect – Geneva International Queer Film Festival

=== Cyprus ===
Queer Wave – Cyprus LGBTQ+ Film Festival

=== Moldova ===
Queer Voices Film Festival

=== Belgium ===
Millenium International Documentary Film Festival
