= Edmond (film) =

2005 American drama film

- Promotional poster
- Directed by: Stuart Gordon
- Written by: David Mamet
- Based on: Edmond by David Mamet
- Produced by: Chris Hanley; Molly Hassell; Duffy Hecht; Stuart Gordon; Roger Kass; Mary McCann; Kevin Ragsdale; Ryan R. Johnson
- Starring: William H. Macy; Joe Mantegna; Mena Suvari; Denise Richards; Bokeem Woodbine; Julia Stiles
- Cinematography: Denis Maloney
- Edited by: Andy Horvitch
- Music by: Bobby Johnston
- Production companies: Muse Productions; Tartan Films; Code Entertainment; Werner Films; 120dB Films; Pretty Dangerous Films; The Hecht Company
- Distributed by: First Independent Pictures
- Release dates: August 31, 2005 (Venice Film Festival); July 14, 2006 (U.S.)
- Running time: 82 minutes
- Country: United States
- Language: English
- Box office: $243,524

Edmond is a 2005 American thriller film directed by Stuart Gordon and starring William H. Macy, based on the 1982 play Edmond by David Mamet. Mamet also wrote the screenplay for the film. Edmond features Julia Stiles, Rebecca Pidgeon, Denise Richards, Mena Suvari, Joe Mantegna, Bai Ling, Jeffrey Combs, Dylan Walsh and George Wendt in supporting roles. It was screened at several film festivals from September 2005 to May 2006, and had a limited release on July 14, 2006.

== Plot ==
Edmond Burke is a middle-aged New York City businessman who visits a tarot fortune teller on the way home. The fortune teller, a little startled, tells him that "you are not where you belong". He decides to make changes in his life, beginning by leaving his wife. At a bar, Edmond tells a fellow patron that he has not had sex in a while and that marriage took away his masculinity. The man gives him the address to a strip club, where Edmond is kicked out by a bouncer for not paying for a stripper's drink. Now even more sexually frustrated, Edmond goes to a peep show; having never been to such a place before, he is disappointed when he realizes that he is not allowed to have actual sex with the performer.

Next Edmond goes to a white-collar bordello, but cannot afford a hooker. He needs money, so he plays a three-card Monte game with a street dealer. When Edmond accuses the dealer of cheating, the dealer and his shill beat him up and steal his money. Edmond becomes enraged by what he sees as the contempt, prejudice and greed of society. He pawns his wedding ring in exchange for a knife. He is approached by a pimp who offers Edmond a "clean girl" and lures him to an alleyway, where the pimp attempts to mug him. In a wild rage, Edmond attacks the pimp with his knife while hurling racial slurs at him. He leaves him wounded and possibly dying in the alley.

Suddenly euphoric, Edmond enters a coffee shop and tells a young waitress, Glenna, his newfound worldview of instant gratification. They end up having sex at her apartment. Glenna likes him at first, but she is soon frightened by his increasingly erratic behavior and calls for help. An enraged Edmond slashes her to death, blaming her own insecurity for her murder. On a subway train, he has an angry confrontation with a female passenger. Edmond comes across a church service where a minister preaches about respect and faith. Edmond feels the urge to preach about his own experiences, and as he stands in the doorway of the church, the woman from the subway recognizes him and calls into the street for the police. The responding officer pats Edmond down to find the knife in his front jacket pocket. Edmond is arrested.

In jail, Edmond begins to appreciate the security of his old life, but it is too late; the police have reason to believe that the knife found in Edmond's pocket may be the weapon used in Glenna's murder. The interrogating officer bluntly asks Edmond why he killed Glenna, to Edmond's shock and disbelief. He is sent to prison for her murder. There, Edmond is paired with a black cellmate. He likes prison because it is simple. He speaks of how he has always feared black people, but now that he shares a room with one, he can finally feel a bond. The indifferent cellmate then forces Edmond to perform oral sex on him. Edmond tells a prison minister what happened, but goes off on a tangent, shouting that God has been unfair to him. When the minister asks why he murdered the waitress, he has no answer.

Years pass. Edmond has cut connections with the outside world, refusing to see visitors. He talks to his cellmate, with whom he has developed a relationship, about the human ego and how life should not be taken for granted. He concludes that by conquering his fears, he might lead a better life. Both men ponder the afterlife. Edmond then goes to sleep comfortably alongside his cellmate. True to the tarot fortune teller's words, Edmond might well have found the place where he belongs.

== Cast ==
- William H. Macy as Edmond Burke
- Frances Bay as Fortune Teller
- Patricia Belcher as Subway Woman
- Jeffrey Combs as Desk Clerk
- Barry Cullison as Pawn Shop Customer
- Vincent Guastaferro as Club Manager
- Dulé Hill as Sharper
- Aldis Hodge as Leafletter
- Russell Hornsby as Shill
- Matt Landers as Bystander
- Bai Ling as Peep Show Girl
- Joe Mantegna as man in bar
- Debi Mazar as Matron
- Rebecca Pidgeon as Mrs. Burke
- Denise Richards as B-Girl
- Michael Saad as Library Guard
- Lionel Mark Smith as Pimp
- Julia Stiles as Glenna
- Mena Suvari as Whore
- Marcus Thomas as Window Man
- Wendy Thompson as Cocktail Waitress
- Jack Wallace as Chaplain
- Dylan Walsh as Interrogator
- George Wendt as Pawn Shop Owner
- Bokeem Woodbine as Edmond's cellmate
- Bruce A. Young as Policeman

== Reception ==
The film received mixed reviews from critics. The review aggregator website Rotten Tomatoes reported that 47% of critics gave the film positive reviews, based on 74 reviews. The website's consensus reads, "Despite an electrifying performance by William H. Macy, David Mamet's one-act morality play translates poorly into a film that is overburdened by dialogue." Metacritic reported the film had an average score of 61 out of 100, based on 21 reviews, indicating "generally favorable" reviews.

The New York Times film critic Stephen Holden said:

William H. Macy is perfectly cast... a master at playing sticks of human dynamite in mild-mannered camouflage... the nerviest screen performance of his career.
A faithful adaptation of the one-act play from 1982... its taunting insistence that everyone is racist, voiced in abrasive, staccato Mamet-speak, leaves you feeling battered and vaguely guilty. As in much of Mr. Mamet's work, there is a quality of adolescent nose-thumbing, as though it all might be a cruel practical joke designed solely to make us squirm... it was certainly unforgettable.

== Awards ==
=== Wins and nominations ===
Year	Group	Award	Won	Notes
2005	Deauville American Film Festival Grand Jury Prize	Stuart Gordon	No	
2005	Newport International Film Festival Achievement Award	Acting	Yes	
2006	Mar del Plata Film Festival Best Actor Award	William H. Macy	Yes	
