= Ice Merchants =

- Directed by: João Gonzalez
- Written by: João Gonzalez
- Produced by: Bruno Caetano; Michael Proença
- Production companies: Cola; Wild Stream
- Distributed by: Cinemundo
- Release date: 2022
- Running time: 14 minutes
- Countries: Portugal; United Kingdom; France

Ice Merchants is a 2022 animated short film directed by João Gonzalez. The 14-minute short about family love is the first ever Portuguese animation to be awarded at the Cannes Film Festival, where it premiered as part of the 2022 Critics' Week (Semaine de la Critique). The film has been featured in a number of international film festivals, receiving accolades such as the Gold Hugo award for Best Animated Short at the Chicago International Film Festival and won over nine awards in festivals and a nomination for the 95th Academy Awards in the category of Best Animated Short Film.

== Plot ==
Every day, a father and his son jump with a parachute from their house on a cliff to go to the village, where they sell ice. While falling, they always lose their matching hats, and they buy themselves new ones while in town. They then return to their house through the use of a pulley system, where they spend time together and bond. The boy's mother has died some time ago, but her presence is still on the mind of the father and son, whether by her unused mug or her empty space in the bed.

One morning, the temperature is so warm that there is no ice to sell, and melting snow falls heavily on the house, breaking it away from the cliff. The backpack with the parachute falls away, leaving the father and son stranded. Realizing that they have no chance for survival, the father holds the son tightly and jumps from the collapsing house. On the way down, they are met by a vision of the mother, who holds on to the pair and pulls her own parachute.

The father and son miraculously land on the massive pile of hats that have accumulated on the forest floor below the house and are saved. They walk off to the village, taking a hat for the son along the way.

== Reception ==
Since its release, the film has been selected in various festivals around the world:

Year	Festivals	Award/Category	Status
2022	Cannes International Film Festival	Leitz Cine Discovery Prize	Won
2022	Toronto International Film Festival	IMDbPro Short Cuts Award for Best Film	Nominated
2022	Melbourne International Film Festival	Best Animated Short Film	Won
2022	Chicago International Film Festival	Gold Hugo for Best Animated Short	Won
2022	European Film Awards	Animated European Short Film	Nominated
2022	Valladolid International Film Festival	Golden Spike for Best Short Film	Nominated
2022	Valladolid International Film Festival	Silver Spike for Best Short Film	Won
2022	Valladolid International Film Festival	Green Spike Special Mention for Best Short Film	Won
2022	Vila Do Conde International Short Film Festival	Best Film National Competition	Won
2022	Vila Do Conde International Short Film Festival	Audience Award International Competition	Won
2023	Academy Awards	Best Animated Short	Nominated
2023	Annie Awards	Best Animated Short Subject	Won
2023	Quirino Awards	Best Ibero-American Short Film	Nominated
2023	Quirino Awards	Best Visual Development	Won
2023	Quirino Awards	Best Animation Design	Nominated
2023	Quirino Awards	Best Sound Design and Original Music	Nominated
