= BFI Future Film Festival =

Coordinates: 51°30′25″N 0°06′55″W

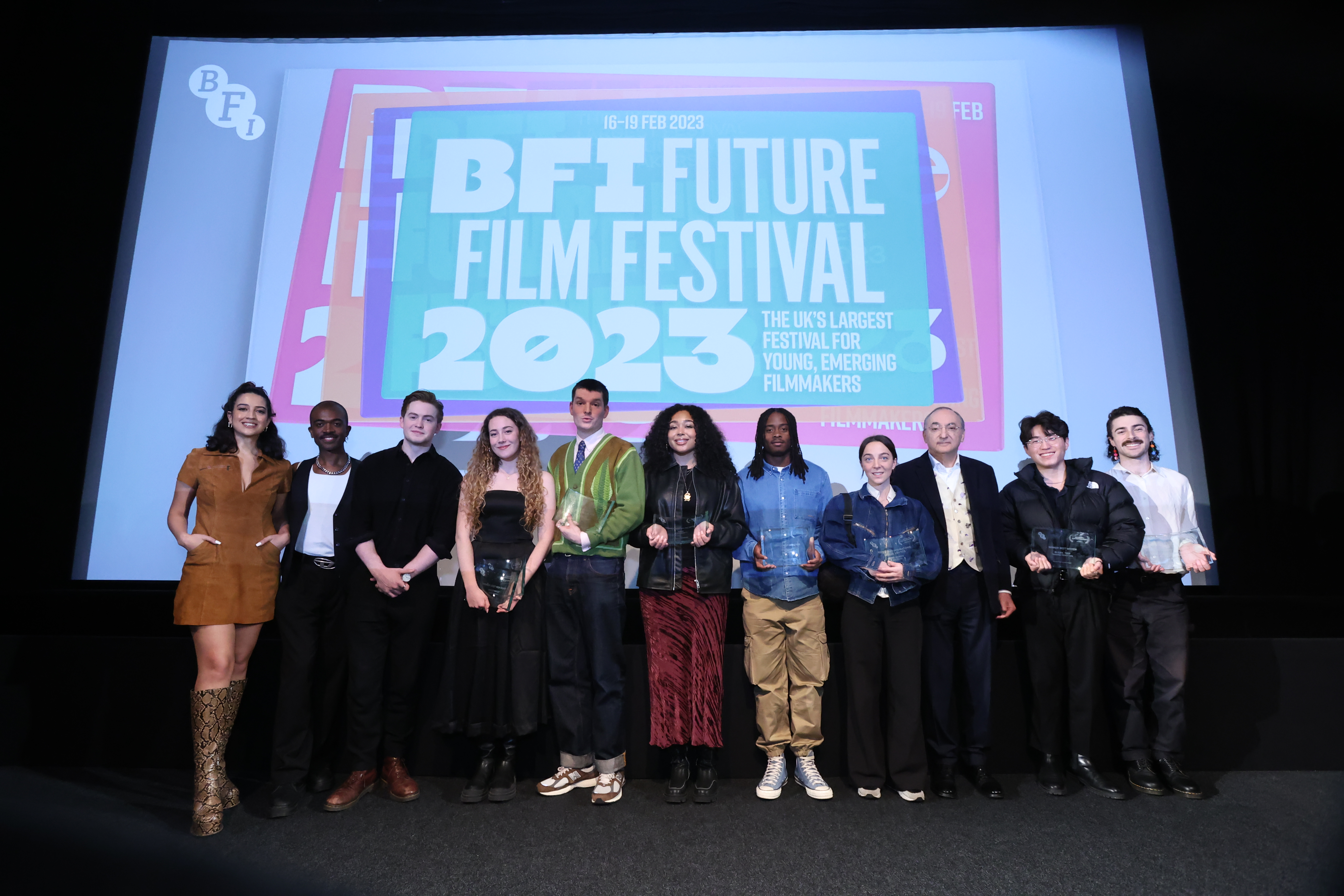
BFI Future Film Festival 2023 award winners and jury, on stage at BFI Southbank

The BFI Future Film Festival is a film festival which aims "to help young people break into the screen industries", organised by the British Film Institute. Founded in 2008, it takes place over four days in February each year, and focuses equally on fiction, animation and documentary, as well as TV and video games.

The festival provides young people with masterclasses, workshops and film screenings from emerging filmmakers, at BFI Southbank in London. Since 2020, the festival has simultaneously run online events, aimed at young people across the UK. Since 2024, the festival expanded to also have events and screenings in venues UK wide.

Before the second year of the festival, the BBC's Creative Director, Alan Yentob, said: "It's going to give young people a fantastic opportunity to get involved in something creative and possibly life-changing. Who knows, we may even be able to spot a couple of BAFTA winners of the future." The Guardian noted that the "festival is aimed at nurturing young film-makers, and there's plenty for them to be inspired by". 2017 and 2020 award winner Charlotte Regan has subsequently been nominated by BAFTA and won the World Cinema Grand Jury Prize: Dramatic at Sundance Film Festival for her debut feature, Scrapper.

== Notable speakers ==
- Daisy Ridley
- Reggie Yates
- Alice Oseman
- Peter Kosminsky
- Kit Connor
- Bella Ramsey
- Rian Johnson
- Spike Lee
- Jesse Armstrong
- Nida Manzoor
- Daisy Edgar-Jones
- Edgar Wright
- Nicola Coughlan

== Awards ==
17th Future Film Festival (2024)

- Best Film - The Third Ear (Nathan Ginter)
- Best Director - All Up There (Bonnie MacRae)
- Best New Talent - Stir (Tiffany Whitney Chang)
- Best Animation - Bird Drone (Radheya Jegatheva)
- Best International Film - Dreams of Home (Justin Kaminuma)
- International Special Mention - Rock Springs (David Huang)
- Best Writer - Are You Okay? (Jack McLoughlin)
- Best Experimental Film - Lucidity (Kit Warner)
- Best Documentary - Guardians (Minerva Navasca)
- Best Micro Short - 36,000 Words for Love (Zeb Goriely)

16th Future Film Festival (2023)

- Best Film - Underbelly (Edie Moles)
- Best Director - Drop Out (Ade Femzo)
- Best New Talent - Underbelly (Edie Moles)
- Best Animation - Interdimensional Pizza Pushers (Lije Morgan)
- Best International Film - Busan, 1999 (Thomas Percy Kim)
- International Special Mention - Being Human (Klara Bond)
- Best Writer - Busan, 1999 (Thomas Percy Kim)
- Best Experimental Film - CANNED (Clemente Lohr)
- Best Documentary - Pacing the Pool (Radheya Jegatheva)
- Best Micro Short - Safe (Aleah Scott)

15th Future Film Festival (2022)

- Best Film - The Gospel According to Gail (Florence Winter Hill)
- Best Director - Heart Failure (Will Wightman)
- Best New Talent - Exhale (Adekemi Roluga)
- Best Animation - Divination Dave (Georgia Madden)
- Best International Film - Mirrored Family (Evan Kerbage)
- International Special Mention - This Time With Feeling (Spencer Glassman)
- Best Writer - You Look Fine (Kit Byford)
- Best Experimental Film - Blackmael (Bradley Banton)
- Best Documentary - Homebound (Lucy Werrett)
- Best Micro Short - Stolen. (Christina Giordano)

14th Future Film Festival (2021)

- Best Film - Loco (Rory Wilson)
- Best Director - Instructions to Let Go (Gustavo Gamero)
- Best New Talent - Music for the End of the World (Emmanuel Li)
- Best Animation - The Quiet (Radheya Jegatheva)
- Best International Film - The Quiet (Radheya Jegatheva)
- International Special Mention - Damn Hobo! (Luis Gerardo LoGar)
- Best Writer - The Massive Fucking Bender (Laura Marcus)
- Best Experimental Film - Dudu (Simisolaoluwa Akande)
- Best Documentary - Life is a Highway (Neelakshi Yadav)
- Best Micro Short - Breath (Aneta Siurnicka)

13th Future Film Festival (2020)

- Best International Short - CANCEL (Sebastian Micci)
- Best International Short: Special Mention - One Frame Raid Per Siren (Khaled Moeit)
- Best New Talent: Animation - Simona Mehandzhieva (Duo)
- Best New Talent: Documentary - Tracey Lopes & Alicia Quayson (Motherland)
- Best Non-Narrative Film - In Passing (Esther Cheung)
- Best Writer - Ben Hector (Old Friends)
- Best Director - Charlotte Regan (Paired Up)
- Best 16–18 Short Film - Home on the Road (Miha Verdonik)
- Best 19–25 Short Film - All the King's Men (Amber Little)
- Future Film Lab Award - Virginia (Francesco Puppini)

12th Future Film Festival (2019)

- Best International Short (sponsored by The London School of English) - Departures by Nicolas Morganti Patrignani
- Best International New Talent - Dulce Hogar (Sweet Tooth by Giovana Olmos)
- New Talent Awards - The Grey Area (Katie Clark), Agya (Curtis Essel), John Ogunmuyiwa (Wilson), Dorothy Allen-Pickard (The Mess)
- Black Dog Production Award for Best Non-Narrative Film - As Is by Alice Bloomfield
- Best 16-18 UK Short Film - The Milk Bottle by Saul Lotzof
- Best 19-25 UK Short Film - Henceforth by Charlene Jones
- Future Film Lab Award - Alex Deitsch

11th Future Film Festival (2018)

- Best Experimental Short Award — Dead. Tissue. Love (Natasha Austin-Green)
- Hiive Audience Award — False Men (Christopher Chuky)
- BFI Patron’s New Talent Awards - Amygdala (George Graham), Beneath the Surface (Yero Timi-Biu), V (Ellie Gocher), The Fence (Rashida Seriki)
- International New Talent Award - The Voyager (João Gonzalez)
- The Best International Short Award — Local Monuments (Sebastián Martínez Valdivia)
- Best 16-18 UK Short — Father | Daughter (Oskar Nilsson)
- Best 19-25 UK Short — Calling Home (Jade Jackman)
- Future Film Lab Award sponsored by Lacie — The Fence (Rashida Seriki)

10th Future Film Festival (2017)

- Best Experimental Short - One Diving, One Falling by Harry Cauty
- New Talent Awards - Emma Changes the Lock by Julia Hart, Addy by Matty Crawford, Run by Thea Gajic
- Best International Short (sponsored by The London School of English/London School Trust) - Miriam by Sarah Lederman
- Best 16-18 UK Short Film - Lux by Issy Snailham
- Best 19-25 UK Short Film - Fish Story by Charlie Lyne
- Future Film Lab Award - Standby by Charlotte Regan and Jack Hannon
- Hiive Audience Award - Venus by Fay Carr-Wilson

9th Future Film Festival (2016)

- Best Experimental Short - Power to the Mini Beasts by Ella Bee Glendining and Florence Watson
- Best Micro Short - Stalkers by Fred Tilby-Jones
- Best International Short - Horseface by Marc Martínez Jordán
- Best 16-18 UK Short Film - You Know That Feeling by Emily Llewllyn
- Best 19-25 UK Short Film - Isabella by Duncan Cowles, Ross Hogg
- Best Writer – I'm Good With Plants by Thomas Harnett Omeara
- Best Producer – Slow Down by Megan K. Fox
- Best Director – She Would Move the Tree Rather More to the Middle by Anna Maguire

== See also ==
- BFI London Film Festival
- BFI Flare: London LGBT Film Festival
