= Kit Zauhar =

American filmmaker

- Born: June 6, 1995 (age 31); Philadelphia, Pennsylvania
- Occupations: Film director, screenwriter, actress

Kit Zauhar (born June 6, 1995) is an Asian American filmmaker best known for the feature films Actual People and This Closeness.

== Early life ==
Zauhar was born in Philadelphia. Her mother is a Chinese immigrant who came to the United States to study medicine, while her father is white. She has one sister. In high school, Zauhar directed her first short film, titled It Was Fall.

== Education ==
Zauhar graduated from New York University in 2017. She later enrolled in a Master of Fine Arts program in nonfiction writing at Columbia University, but left the program after a year amid the onset of the COVID-19 pandemic to finish work on her first feature film.

== Career ==
While attending NYU, Zauhar wrote and directed the short film Helicopter, released in 2016. Her 2018 short film Terrestrials, about a device that allows people to meet for anonymous sex on the metaphysical plane, was recognized with the Best Screenplay award in the International Short Film Competition during the 2019 Fantasia International Film Festival.

Zauhar wrote, directed, and starred in her debut feature, Actual People, an autofictional work inspired by her final week at NYU which premiered at the 2021 Locarno Film Festival. Her 2023 film This Closeness, about a weekend in the life of a young couple renting a home from an awkward host in Philadelphia, debuted at the South by Southwest Film Festival; Factory 25 acquired the film for a limited theatrical run the following year.

In June 2024, Variety reported that Zauhar would adapt the 2010 Sheila Heti novel How Should a Person Be? for Neon Heart Productions, the company that produced This Closeness.

== Filmography ==
Year	Title	Notes	Ref.
2016	Helicopter	Short film	
2018	The Terrestrials	Short film	
2021	Actual People	—N/a	
2023	This Closeness	—N/a	

== Awards and nominations ==
Year	Award	Category	Nominated work	Result	Ref.
2019	Fantasia International Film Festival	Best Screenplay, International Short Film Competition	The Terrestrials	Won	
2021	Locarno Film Festival	Filmmakers of the Present Competition	Actual People	Nominated	
2022	Indie Memphis Film Festival	Duncan Williams Best Screenplay Award	Actual People	Won	
2022	Slamdance Film Festival	Outstanding Performance in a Feature Film	Actual People	Nominated	
2022	Jeonju International Film Festival	International Competition	Actual People	Nominated	
2023	South by Southwest Film Festival	Narrative Spotlight	This Closeness	Nominated	
2023	Champs-Élysées Film Festival	American Feature Film Competition	This Closeness	Nominated	
2023	Seattle International Film Festival	New American Cinema Competition Special Jury Prize	This Closeness	Won	
2023	Valencia International Cinema Jove Film Festival	Young Jury Award for Best Feature Film	This Closeness	Won	
2023	Philadelphia Film Festival	Best Local Feature	This Closeness	Nominated	
