= Paris Zarcilla =

British film director and writer

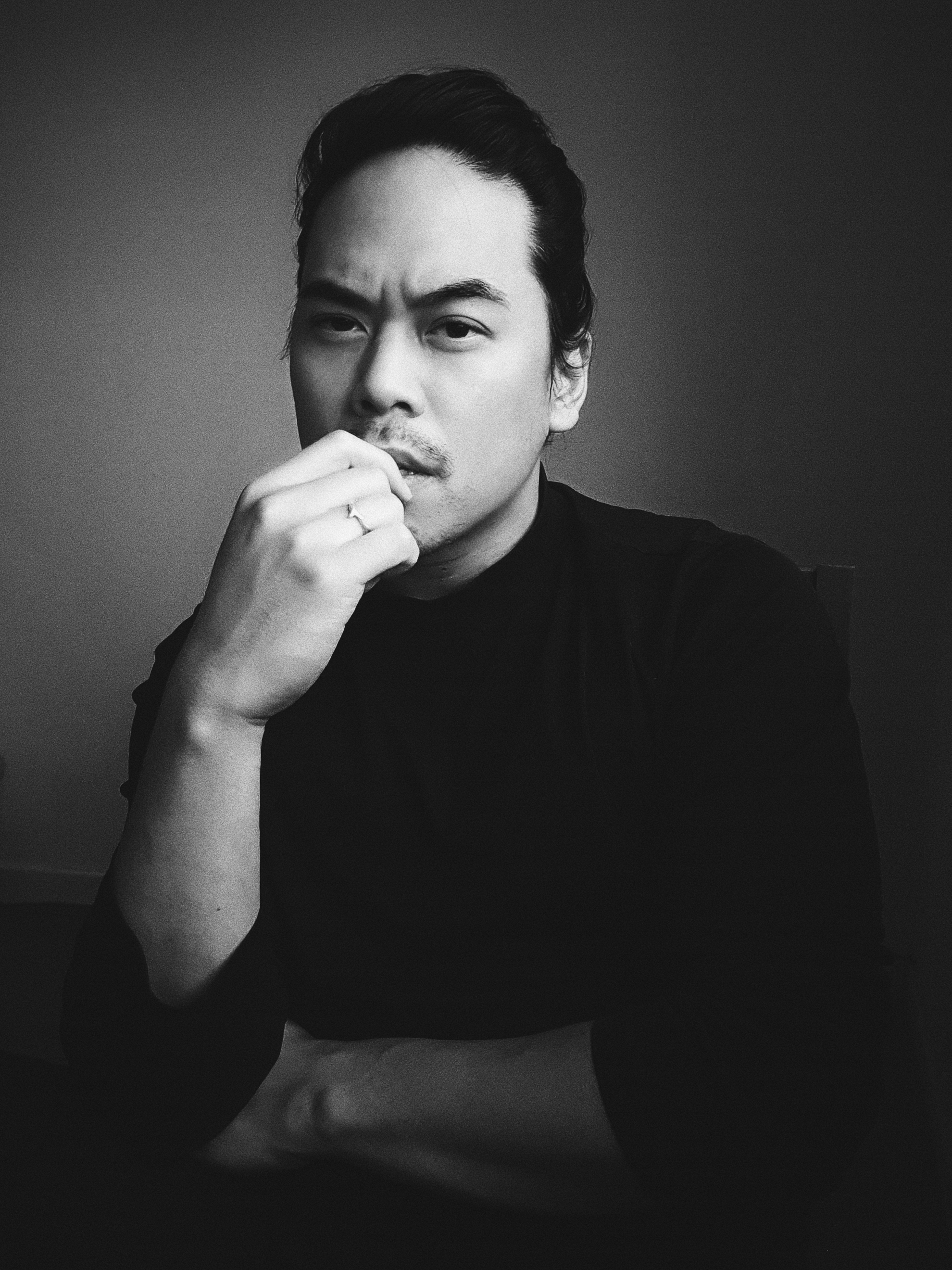
- Paris Zarcilla - Festival portrait 2023
- Born: July 1986 (age 40); Westminster, London, England
- Education: University of Hertfordshire
- Years active: 2011–present
- Website: www.pariszarcilla.com

Paris Zarcilla (born July 1986) is a British film director and writer. His debut feature Raging Grace (2023), the first in a trilogy, won the Narrative Grand Jury Award and Thunderbird Rising Award for best debut at SXSW 2023 and was nominated for a British Independent Film Award.

== Early life ==
Zarcilla was born in central London to Filipino parents who ran a cafe on Lisson Grove. He studied Digital Animation at the University of Hertfordshire, graduating in 2008.

== Career ==
During university, Zarcilla had his first filmmaking experiences shooting music videos for friends. He had his first professional gigs with commercials. With Daryl Atkins, Zarcilla co-founded the production company Sudden Black in 2011 and served as creative director until 2016. He filmed the music video for Cher Lloyd's "Dub on the Track" (2011). He directed Slow Magic's Feel Flows, which was named Best Music Video at the 2013 London Independent Film Festival and featured in the Cannes Short Film Corner.

Zarcilla's first short film Pommel (2018), about rival gymnastics brothers, was nominated for a British Independent Film Award (BIFA). He was commissioned to write and direct a Singaporean two-part drama The Century Egg for StarHub and worked as a second-unit director to Sally Wainwright on the Disney+ series Renegade Nell. In December 2021, Zarcilla was one of six selected for the BFI Flares x BAFTA Crew programme, through which he was mentored by Tze Chun.

Angered by the treatment of immigrant workers during the COVID-19 pandemic and uptick in racism against South-East Asian people, Zarcilla channelled that into making his feature directorial debut Raging Grace, a gothic horror film and the first in a trilogy. The film opened at the 2023 South by Southwest (SXSW) in Texas, where it won the Narrative Feature Jury Award and the Thunderbird Rising Award for Best Debut. It went on to pick up three awards at the Neuchâtel International Fantastic Film Festival and was nominated for the 2023 British Independent Film Awards' (BIFA) Raindance Maverick Award.

The second installment in the Rage trilogy, to be made with producer Chi Thai, will be titled Domestic and set in the British-Filipino community of 1990's London, while the third, titled Ocean On Fire, will be set in the Philippines. Once he completes the trilogy, Zarcilla intends to go in a different direction with a romantic comedy.

== Artistry ==
On Letterboxd, Zarcilla named nine films that influenced Raging Grace: Joseph Losey's The Servant (1963), Bong Joon Ho's short Shaking Tokyo (2008), Alfred Hitchcock's Rebecca (1940), Ingmar Bergman's Fanny and Alexander (1982), Alfonso Cuarón's Roma (2018), Peter Medak's The Changeling (1980), Danny DeVito's Matilda (1996), Hirokazu Koreeda's Nobody Knows (2004), and Alejandro Amenábar's The Others (2001).

In terms of writing, Zarcilla has praised the likes of Sally Wainwright, Russell T Davies and Sharon Horgan, and expressed a desire to work with Nathan Bryon, Lee Sung Jin, Craig Mazin, and Mika Watkins.

== Personal life ==
In 2018, Zarcilla went viral on social media when he unexpectedly found a cat and her litter of four kittens in his East London flat. He ended up taking the cats in and became known online as "cat dad".

== Select filmography ==
- "Dub on the Track" (2011) – music video, Cher Lloyd
- "Feel Flows" (2013) – music video, Slow Magic
- Pommel (2018) – short
- Raging Grace (2023)
- Domestic (TBA)
- Ocean On Fire (TBA)
