= Laura Gabbert =

American film director

Laura Gabbert is an American film director.

== Filmography ==
=== Director ===
- Sunset Story (2003)
- No Impact Man (2009)
- City of Gold (2015)
- Ottolenghi and the Cakes of Versailles (2020)
- Food and Country (2023)
