= List of LGBTQ-related films of 2023 =

List of 2023 LGBT movies

This is a list of lesbian, gay, bisexual, transgender or queer-related films released in 2023. It contains theatrically released films that deal with important gay, lesbian, bisexual, transgender or queer characters or issues and may have same-sex romance or relationships as a plot device.

== Films ==
| Title | Director | Country | Genre | Cast | Notes | Ref |
|---|---|---|---|---|---|---|
| 20,000 Species of Bees (20.000 especies de abejas) | Estibaliz Urresola Solaguren | Spain | Drama | Sofía Otero, Patricia López Arnaiz | | |
| About Thirty (Arturo a los 30) | Martin Shanly | Argentina | Drama | | | |
| After | Anthony Lapia | France | Drama | | | |
| Afire | Christian Petzold | Germany | Drama | Thomas Schubert, Paula Beer | | |
| All of Us Strangers | Andrew Haigh | United Kingdom | Drama | Andrew Scott, Paul Mescal, Jamie Bell, Claire Foy | Second film adaptation of the 1987 novel, Strangers by Taichi Yamada. | |
| All the Colours of the World Are Between Black and White | Babatunde Apalowo | Nigeria | Drama | | | |
| Almamula | Juan Sebastian Torales | France, Argentina, Italy | Drama | | | |
| Along Came Love (Le Temps d'aimer) | Katell Quillévéré | France, Belgium | Drama | Anaïs Demoustier, Vincent Lacoste | | |
| Altona | Heath Affolter, Jon Affolter, Nathan Affolter, Thomas Affolter | Canada | Documentary | Tyler Pelke | | |
| Anatomy of a Fall (Anatomie d'une chute) | Justine Triet | France | Thriller | Sandra Hüller, Swann Arlaud | | |
| Asog | Seán Devlin | Canada | Drama | Rey Aclao, Arnel Pablo, Ricky Gacho Jr. | | |
| Backspot | D. W. Waterson | Canada | Drama | Devery Jacobs, Kudakwashe Rutendo, Evan Rachel Wood, Thomas Anthony Olajide | | |
| BabyCat | Scott Hillman | United States | Comedy | | | |
| The Beast in the Jungle | Patric Chiha | France, Belgium, Austria | Drama | | | |
| Big Boys | Corey Sherman | United States | Drama | Isaac Krasner, Dora Madison, David Johnson III, Taj Cross, Marion Van Cuyck, Emma Broz, Jack De Sanz | | |
| Bolero | Nans Laborde-Jourdàa | France | Short drama | François Chaignaud | Winner of the Queer Palm for Best Short Film | |
| Bones and Names (Knochen und namen) | Fabian Stumm | Germany | Drama | | | |
| Bottoms | Emma Seligman | United States | Comedy | Rachel Sennott, Ayo Edebiri, Havana Rose Liu, Kaia Gerber | | |
| Broken Hearts Trip | Lemuel Lorca | Philippines | Comedy | Christian Bables, Teejay Marquez, Marvin Yap, Petite, Iyah Mina, Andoy Ranay | | |
| Calls from Moscow (Llamadas desde Moscú) | Luís Alejandro Yero | Cuba, Germany, Norway | Documentary | | | |
| Cassandro | Roger Ross Williams | United States | Drama | Gael García Bernal, Roberta Colindrez | | |
| The Castle (El Castillo) | Martin Benchimol | Argentina, France | Drama | | | |
| Chestnut | Jac Cron | United States | Drama | Natalia Dyer, Rachel Keller, Danny Ramirez, Chella Man | | |
| Chuck Chuck Baby | Janis Pugh | United Kingdom | Comedy-drama | | | |
| Close to You | Dominic Savage | Canada, United Kingdom | Drama | Elliot Page | | |
| The Color Purple | Blitz Bazawule | United States | Musical | Fantasia Barrino, Taraji P. Henson, Danielle Brooks, Colman Domingo | | |
| Commitment to Life | Jeffrey Schwarz | United States | Documentary | | | |
| Cora Bora | Hannah Pearl Utt | United States | Comedy-drama | Megan Stalter, Jojo T. Gibbs, Manny Jacinto | | |
| The Critic | Anand Tucker | United Kingdom | Thriller drama | | | |
| Dalton's Dream | Kim Longinotto, Franky Murray Brown | United Kingdom | Documentary | Dalton Harris | | |
| Days of Happiness (Les Jours heureux) | Chloé Robichaud | Canada | Drama | Sophie Desmarais, Sylvain Marcel, Nour Belkhiria, Vincent Leclerc | | |
| Dicks: The Musical | Larry Charles | United States | Musical comedy | | | |
| Down Low | Rightor Doyle | United States | Comedy | Lukas Gage, Zachary Quinto, Simon Rex | | |
| Drifter | Hannes Hirsch | Germany | Drama | | | |
| Eileen | William Oldroyd | United States | Thriller | Anne Hathaway, Thomasin McKenzie | | |
| Ek Jagah Apni | Ektara Collective | India | Drama | | SXSW Audience Choice award | |
| El Sabor de la Navidad | Alejandro Lozano | Mexico | Drama | | | |
| L'Empremier Live at Beaubassin (1970) | Rémi Belliveau | Canada | Musical mockumentary | Rémi Belliveau, Katrine Noël, Mico Roy, Jason LeBlanc, Pierre-Guy Blanchard, Marie-Andrée Gaudet | | |
| Enter the Drag Dragon | Lee Demarbre | Canada | Action comedy | | | |
| Eviction (Éviction) | Mathilde Capone | Canada | Documentary | | | |
| Fancy Dance | Erica Tremblay | United States | Drama | Lily Gladstone, Isabel Deroy-Olson | | |
| Femme | Sam H. Freeman, Ng Choon Ping | United Kingdom | Drama | George MacKay, Nathan Stewart-Jarrett | | |
| For Better and for Worse | Tristan Séguéla | France | Comedy | Fabrice Luchini, Catherine Frot | A trans man announces to his spouse, a conservative mayor, his intentions to transition. | |
| Frybread Face and Me | Billy Luther | United States | Drama | | | |
| Gamodi | Felix Kalmenson | Canada, Georgia | Science fiction | Matt Shally, Maqzime Rauch, Luka Chachxiani | | |
| Glitter & Doom | Tom Gustafson | United States | Musical | Alex Diaz, Alan Cammish, Missi Pyle, Lea DeLaria, Tig Notaro | | |
| Gondola | Veit Helmer | Germany, Georgia | Drama | Mathilde Irrmann, Nino Soselia | | |
| Good Grief | Dan Levy | United States | Comedy-drama | Dan Levy, Ruth Negga, Himesh Patel, Luke Evans, Celia Imrie, Arnaud Valois, David Bradley, Jamael Westman | | |
| Green Night | Shuai Han | Hong Kong, China | Drama | | | |
| Haddi | Akshat Ajay Sharma | India | Drama | Nawazuddin Siddiqui | Revenge drama and history of Indian transgender people. | |
| Hailey Rose | Sandi Somers | Canada | Comedy-drama | Em Haine, Caitlynne Medrek, Kari Matchett | | |
| Hell of a Summer | Finn Wolfhard, Billy Bryk | Canada, United States | Horror comedy | | | |
| Homecoming (Le Retour) | Catherine Corsini | France | Drama | | | |
| How to Have Sex | Molly Manning Walker | United Kingdom | Drama | Mia McKenna-Bruce, Lara Peake, Samuel Bottomley | | |
| The Human Surge 3 (El Auge del Humano 3) | Eduardo Williams | United Kingdom | Argentina, Portugal, Brazil, Netherlands, Taiwan, Hong Kong, Sri Lanka, Peru | | | |
| Hummingbirds | Silvia Del Carmen Castaños, Estefanía "Beba" Contreras | United States | Documentary | | | |
| Hunt | Mahesh Surapaneni | India | Action thriller | | | |
| I Am Sirat | Deepa Mehta, Sirat Taneja | Canada | Documentary | Sirat Taneja | | |
| I Don't Know Who You Are | M. H. Murray | Canada | Drama | Mark Clennon | | |
| I Used to Be Funny | Ally Pankiw | Canada | Comedy, drama | Rachel Sennott, Sabrina Jalees, Caleb Hearon | | |
| In the Company of Women (Las buenas compañías) | Sílvia Munt | Spain, France | Drama | | | |
| Între revoluții | Vlad Petri | Romania, Croatia, Qatar, Iran | Drama | | | |
| It's Only Life After All | Alexandra Bombach | United States | Documentary | Emily Saliers, Amy Ray | | |
| Jagged Mind | Kelley Kali | United States | Horror | | | |
| Joan Baez: I Am a Noise | Karen O'Connor, Miri Navasky, Maeve O'Boyle | United States | Documentary | | | |
| The Judgment | Marwan Mokbel | Egypt, Lebanon, United States | Junes Zahdi, Freddy Shahin, Samara Nohra | Horror | | |
| Kill Boksoon | Byun Sung-hyun | South Korea | Drama | | | |
| Knock at the Cabin | M. Night Shyamalan | United States | Apocalyptic psychological horror | Jonathan Groff, Ben Aldridge, Dave Bautista | A married gay couple and their daughter are held hostage by four strangers. | |
| Kokomo City | D. Smith | United States | Documentary | | Exploration of the lives and identities of four Black transgender sex workers | |
| Kubi | Takeshi Kitano | Japan | Action drama | | | |
| Leilani's Fortune | Loveleen Kaur | Canada | Documentary | Witch Prophet | | |
| Lil Nas X: Long Live Montero | Carlos López Estrada, Zac Manuel | United States | Documentary | Lil Nas X | | |
| Little Richard: I Am Everything | Lisa Cortés | United States | Documentary | Little Richard | | |
| Living Bad (Viver mal) | João Canijo | France, Portugal | Drama | | | |
| Long Long Kiss (Langer Langer Kuss) | Lukas Röder | Germany | Drama | | | |
| The Lost Boys (Le Paradis) | Zeno Graton | France, Belgium | Drama | | | |
| Love & Revolution | Alejandro Marín | Spain | Drama | Ana Wagener, Omar Banana, Alba Flores, Jesús Carroza | | |
| Love to Love You, Donna Summer | Brooklyn Sudano, Roger Ross Williams | United States | Documentary | | | |
| Mammalia | Sebastian Mihăilescu | Romania, Poland, Germany | Drama | | | |
| Manodrome | John Trengove | United States, United Kingdom | Drama | Jesse Eisenberg, Adrien Brody, Odessa Young | | |
| Marry My Dead Body | Cheng Wei-hao | Taiwan | Supernatural comedy mystery | Greg Hsu, Austin Lin, Gingle Wang | An unlikely couple transcends the boundaries of life, death, love and gender through a ghost marriage. | |
| The Mattachine Family | Andy Vallentine | United States | Comedy-drama | Nico Tortorella, Juan Pablo Di Pace, Emily Hampshire, Heather Matarazzo, Jake Choi, Garrett Clayton, Carl Clemons-Hopkins | | |
| Meat | Roger Conners | United States | Horror | KateLynn E. Newberry, Roger Conners, Anthony Dain | After the fatal overdose of an underage gay man, an innocent bystander is left to take the blame. | |
| Monster | Hirokazu Kore-eda | Japan | Drama | Sakura Andō, Eita Nagayama, Soya Kurokawa | Winner of the Queer Palm | |
| Mother Saigon (Má Sài Gòn) | Khoa Lê | Canada | Documentary | | | |
| Muscat | Philippe Grenier | Canada | Short drama | Ilyes Tarmasti, Mahmoud Zabennej, Mahmoud Zabennej | | |
| Mutt | Vuk Lungulov-Klotz | United States | Drama | Lío Mehiel, Cole Doman, MiMi Ryder, Alejandro Goic, Jari Jones | Trans man protagonist. | |
| My Animal | Jacqueline Castel | Canada | Horror | Bobbi Salvör Menuez, Amandla Stenberg | Heather is in a struggle for her life against the constrictive forces. When Jonny, an intriguing figure skater enters the rink, Heather's life, sexuality, and personhood is pried open. | |
| National Anthem | Luke Gilford | United States | Drama | Charlie Plummer, Eve Lindley, Mason Alexander Park, Rene Rosado, Robyn Lively | A 21-year-old construction worker in New Mexico joins a community of queer rodeo performers in search of their own version of the American dream. | |
| Narrow Path to Happiness (Keskeny út a boldogság felé) | Kata Oláh | Hungary | Documentary | | | |
| Next Goal Wins | Taika Waititi | United Kingdom, United States | Comedy-drama | | | |
| Nimona | Nick Bruno, Troy Quane | United States, United Kingdom | Animation, science fantasy, adventure comedy | Chloë Grace Moretz, Riz Ahmed, Eugene Lee Yang | Depiction of queerness and gay love | |
| No Stranger at All | Priya Sen | India | Documentary | | | |
| Norwegian Dream | Leiv Igor Devold | Norway | Drama | | | |
| Nuovo Olimpo | Ferzan Özpetek | Italy | Romantic drama | Damiano Gavino, Andrea Di Luigi | | |
| Nyad | Elizabeth Chai Vasarhelyi, Jimmy Chin | United States | Drama | Annette Bening, Jodie Foster, Rhys Ifans | | |
| Opponent (Motståndaren) | Milad Alami | Sweden | Drama | | | |
| Orlando, My Political Biography (Orlando, ma biographie politique) | Paul B. Preciado | France | Documentary | | | |
| Our Body (Notre corps) | Claire Simon | France | Documentary | | | |
| Outside Center | Eli Jean Tahchi | Canada, Germany | Short documentary | Desmond Grant | | |
| Passages | Ira Sachs | France | Romance drama | Franz Rogowski, Ben Whishaw, Adèle Exarchopoulos | Love triangle between two men in couple and a woman. | |
| Perpetrator | Jennifer Reeder | United States | Horror | | | |
| The Persian Version | Maryam Keshavarz | United States | Drama | Layla Mohammadi, Niousha Noor, Bijan Daneshmand | An honest portrayal of a queer woman who remains unapologetically herself, blended into a heartfelt story about family, belonging, and the influence of pop music. | |
| Polarized | Shamim Sarif | Canada | Drama | Holly Deveaux, Maxine Denis | | |
| Power Alley (Levante) | Lillah Halla | Brazil, France, Uruguay | Drama | | | |
| A Prince (Un prince) | Pierre Creton | France | Drama | Pierre Barray, Vincent Barré, Pierre Creton, Antoine Pirotte | | |
| The Queen of My Dreams | Fawzia Mirza | Canada | Drama | Amrit Kaur, Nimra Bucha, Hamza Haq | | |
| Queen Tut | Reem Morsi | Canada | Drama | Ryan Ali, Dani Jazzar, Alexandra Billings, Thom Allison | | |
| Queendom | Agniia Galdanova | United States, France | Documentary | Gena Marvin | | |
| A Queer's Guide to Spiritual Living | Ari Conrad Birch, Michael Heuston | Canada | Documentary | | | |
| Red, White & Royal Blue | Matthew Lopez | United States | Comedy | Taylor Zakhar Perez, Nicholas Galitzine, Uma Thurman | | |
| Riley | Benjamin Howard | United States | Drama | Jake Holley, Colin McCalla, Riley Quinn Scott, Connor Storrie, Rib Hillis | | |
| Rookie | Samantha Lee | Philippines | Pat Tingjuy, Aya Fernandez, Agot Isidro | | | |
| Rotting in the Sun | Sebastián Silva | United States | Drama | | | |
| Runs in the Family | Ian Gabriel | South Africa | Comedy | | | |
| Rustin | George C. Wolfe | United States | Drama | Colman Domingo, Chris Rock, Glynn Turman, Audra McDonald, Aml Ameen | Based on the life of late gay civil rights activist Bayard Rustin. | |
| Sara | Ismail Basbeth | Indonesia | Drama | Asha Smara Darra, Christine Hakim, Mian Tiara, Jajang C. Noer, Landung Simatupang | | |
| Sasaki and Miyano: Graduation | Shinji Ishihira | Japan | Anime, romance | | | |
| Satan Wants You | Steve J. Adams, Sean Horlor | Canada | Documentary | | | |
| Shazam! Fury of the Gods | David F. Sandberg | United States | Fantasy | | | |
| She Is Conann | Bertrand Mandico | Belgium, France, Luxembourg | Fantasy | Claire Duburcq, Elina Löwensohn | Gender-flipped interpretation of Conan the Barbarian | |
| Silver Haze | Sacha Polak | Netherlands, Great Britain | Drama | | | |
| Sisi & I (Sisi & Ich) | Frauke Finsterwalder | Germany, Switzerland, Austria | Drama | | | |
| Solo | Sophie Dupuis | Canada | Drama | Théodore Pellerin, Félix Maritaud, Anne-Marie Cadieux | | |
| A Song Sung Blue | Geng Zihan | China | Drama | | | |
| Strange Way of Life | Pedro Almodóvar | Spain | Drama, Short, Western | Pedro Pascal, Ethan Hawke | A gay western. | |
| The Stroll | Kristen Lovell, Zackary Drucker | United States | Documentary | | The story of New York City's Meatpacking District where trans women of color, turned to for a means of survival. | |
| Summer Qamp | Jen Markowitz | Canada | Documentary | | | |
| The Summer with Carmen (Το καλοκαίρι της Κάρμεν) | Zacharias Mavroeidis | Greece | Comedy | Andreas Labropoulos, Yorgos Tsiantoulas, Roubini Vasilakopoulou, Nikolaos Mihas | | |
| Supporting Our Selves | Lulu Wei | Canada | Documentary | | | |
| T | Jitesh Kumar Parida | India | Drama | | | |
| T Blockers | Alice Maio Mackay | Australia | Horror | Lauren Last, Lewi Dawson, Etcetera Etcetera | A young trans filmmaker struggling to transition in increasingly hostile times for LGBTQ+ people, finds herself the only one who can sense the possessed, and rally the resistance before the horror escapes and spreads. | |
| Thank You for Coming | Karan Boolani | India | Comedy | | | |
| Theater Camp | Molly Gordon | United States | Comedy | | | |
| This Is the End | Vincent Dieutre | France | Documentary | | | |
| Thriving: A Dissociated Reverie | Nicole Bazuin | Canada | Short documentary | Kitoko Mai | | |
| Till the End of the Night | Christoph Hochhäusler | German | Thriller | Timocin Ziegler, Thea Ehrlich and Michael Sideris | | |
| Toll (Pedágio) | Carolina Markowicz | Brazil, Portugal | Drama | Maeve Jinkings | | |
| Transfariana | Joris Lachaise | France, Colombia | Documentary | | | |
| Turtles (Les Tortues) | David Lambert | Belgium, Canada | Drama | Dave Johns, Olivier Gourmet, Brigitte Poupart | | |
| Under the Moonlight (Nur) | Tonny Trimarsanto | Indonesia | Documentary | | | |
| Unicorns | Sally El Hosaini, James Krishna Floyd | United Kingdom, United States, Sweden | Drama | Ben Hardy, Jason Patel | | |
| Unwoman | Gunjan Goel | India | Drama | | | |
| Who I Am Not | Tunde Skovran | Romania, Canada, South Africa, Germany, United States | Documentary | | | |
| Without Air (Elfogy a levegő) | Katalin Moldovai | Hungary | Drama | | | |
| You People | Kenya Barris | United States | Comedy | Jonah Hill, Lauren London, David Duchovny, Nia Long, Julia Louis-Dreyfus, Eddie Murphy, Sam Jay, Travis Bennett, Molly Gordon | | |
| Your Mother's Son (Anak Ka Ng Ina Mo) | Jun Lana | Philippines | Drama | | | |
