= 2023 Sundance Film Festival =

Edition of film festival

- Festival poster
- Location: Park City, Utah
- Founded: 1978
- Hosted by: Sundance Institute
- Festival date: January 19 to 29, 2023
- Language: English
- 2024 Sundance Film Festival 2022 Sundance Film Festival

The 2023 Sundance Film Festival took place from January 19 to 29, 2023. The first lineup of competition films was announced on December 7, 2022.

== Films ==
=== U.S. Dramatic Competition ===
- The Accidental Getaway Driver, directed by Sing J. Lee
- All Dirt Roads Taste of Salt, directed by Raven Jackson
- Fair Play, directed by Chloe Domont
- Fancy Dance, directed by Erica Tremblay
- Magazine Dreams, directed by Elijah Bynum
- Mutt, directed by Vuk Lungulov-Klotz
- The Persian Version, directed by Maryam Keshavarz
- Shortcomings, directed by Randall Park
- Sometimes I Think About Dying, directed by Rachel Lambert
- The Starling Girl, directed by Laurel Parmet
- Theater Camp, directed by Molly Gordon and Nick Lieberman
- A Thousand and One, directed by A.V. Rockwell

=== U.S. Documentary Competition ===
- AUM: The Cult at the End of the World, directed by Ben Braun and Chiaki Yanagimoto
- Bad Press, directed by Rebecca Landsberry-Baker and Joe Peeler
- Beyond Utopia, directed by Madeleine Gavin
- The Disappearance of Shere Hite, directed by Nicole Newnham
- Going to Mars: The Nikki Giovanni Project, directed by Joe Brewster and Michèle Stephenson
- Going Varsity in Mariachi, directed by Alejandra Vasquez and Sam Osborn
- Joonam, directed by Sierra Urich
- Little Richard: I Am Everything, directed by Lisa Cortés
- Nam June Paik: Moon Is the Oldest TV, directed by Amanda Kim
- A Still Small Voice, directed by Luke Lorentzen
- The Stroll, directed by Kristen Lovell and Zackary Drucker
- Victim/Suspect, directed by Nancy Schwartzman

=== Premieres ===
- Cassandro, directed by Roger Ross Williams
- Cat Person, directed by Susanna Fogel
- Deep Rising, directed by Matthieu Rytz
- The Deepest Breath, directed by Laura McGann
- Drift, directed by Anthony Chen
- Earth Mama, directed by Savanah Leaf
- Eileen, directed by William Oldroyd
- Fairyland, written and directed by Andrew Durham
- Flora and Son, directed by John Carney
- Food and Country, directed by Laura Gabbert
- Invisible Beauty, directed by Bethann Hardison and Frédéric Tcheng
- It's Only Life After All, directed by Alexandria Bombach
- Jamojaya, directed by Justin Chon
- Judy Blume Forever, directed by Davina Pardo and Leah Wolchok
- Landscape with Invisible Hand, directed by Cory Finley
- A Little Prayer, directed by Angus MacLachlan
- Murder in Big Horn, directed by Razelle Benally and Matthew Galkin
- Passages, directed by Ira Sachs
- Past Lives, directed by Celine Song
- PLAN C, directed by Tracy Droz Tragos
- The Pod Generation, written and directed by Sophie Barthes
- Pretty Baby: Brooke Shields, directed by Lana Wilson
- Radical, directed by Christopher Zalla
- Rotting in the Sun, directed by Sebastián Silva
- Rye Lane, directed by Raine Allen-Miller
- Still: A Michael J. Fox Movie, directed by Davis Guggenheim
- You Hurt My Feelings, directed by Nicole Holofcener

=== World Cinema Dramatic Competition ===
- Animalia, directed by Sofia Alaoui
- Bad Behaviour, directed by Alice Englert
- Girl, directed by Adura Onashile
- Heroic, directed by David Zonana
- MAMACRUZ, directed by Patricia Ortega
- Mami Wata, directed by C.J. Obasi
- La Pecera, directed by Glorimar Marrero Sánchez
- Scrapper, directed by Charlotte Regan
- Shayda, directed by Noora Niasari
- Slow, directed by Marija Kavtaradze
- Sorcery, directed by Christopher Murray
- When It Melts, directed by Veerle Baetens

=== World Cinema Documentary Competition ===
- 20 Days in Mariupol, directed by Mstyslav Chernov
- 5 Seasons of Revolution, directed by Lina
- Against the Tide, directed by Sarvnik Kaur
- The Eternal Memory, directed by Maite Alberdi
- Fantastic Machine, directed by Axel Danielson
- Iron Butterflies, directed by Roman Liubyi
- Is There Anybody Out There?, directed by Ella Glendining
- The Longest Goodbye, directed by Ido Mizrahy
- Milisuthando, directed by Milisuthando Bongela
- Pianoforte, directed by Jakub Piątek
- Smoke Sauna Sisterhood, directed by Anna Hints
- Twice Colonized, directed by Lin Alluna

=== Next ===
- Bravo, Burkina!, written and directed by Walé Oyéjidé
- Divinity, written and directed by Eddie Alcazar
- Fremont, written and directed by Babak Jalali
- Kim's Video, written and directed by David Redmon and Ashley Sabin
- King Coal, directed by Elaine McMillion Sheldon
- Kokomo City, directed by D. Smith
- To Live and Die and Live, written and directed by Qasim Basir
- The Tuba Thieves, written and directed by Alison O'Daniel
- Young. Wild. Free., directed by Thembi L. Banks

=== Midnight ===
- Birth/Rebirth, directed by Laura Moss
- In My Mother's Skin, written and directed by Kenneth Dagatan
- Infinity Pool, written and directed by Brandon Cronenberg
- My Animal, directed by Jacqueline Castel
- Onyx the Fortuitous and the Talisman of Souls, directed by Andrew Bowser
- Polite Society, written and directed by Nida Manzoor
- Run Rabbit Run, directed by Daina Reid
- Talk to Me, directed by Danny and Michael Philippou

=== Special Screenings ===
- Justice, directed by Doug Liman
- Stephen Curry: Underrated, directed by Peter Nicks

=== Spotlight ===
- The Eight Mountains, written and directed by Felix van Groeningen and Charlotte Vandermeersch
- L'Immensità, directed and co-written by Emanuele Crialese
- Joyland, directed and co-written by Saim Sadiq
- Other People's Children, written and directed by Rebecca Zlotowski
- Squaring the Circle (The Story of Hipgnosis) by Anton Corbijn

=== Kids ===
- Aliens Abducted My Parents and Now I Feel Kinda Left Out, directed by Jake Van Wagoner
- The Amazing Maurice, directed by Toby Genkel and Florian Westermann
- Blueback, directed and co-written by Robert Connolly

=== Indie Episodic ===
- Chanshi, directed by Mickey Triest and Aaron Geva
- The Night Logan Woke Up (La nuit où Laurier Gaudreault s'est réveillé), written and directed by Xavier Dolan
- Poacher, directed by Richie Mehta
- Willie Nelson and Family, directed by Thom Zimny and Oren Moverman

== Awards ==
The following awards were given out:

=== Grand Jury Prizes ===
- U.S. Dramatic Competition – A Thousand and One (A.V. Rockwell)
- U.S. Documentary Competition – Going to Mars: The Nikki Giovanni Project (Joe Brewster and Michèle Stephenson)
- World Cinema Dramatic Competition – Scrapper (Charlotte Regan)
- World Cinema Documentary Competition – The Eternal Memory (Maite Alberdi)

=== Audience Awards ===
- Festival Favorite – Radical (Christopher Zalla)
- U.S. Dramatic Competition – The Persian Version (Maryam Keshavarz)
- U.S. Documentary Competition – Beyond Utopia (Madeleine Gavin)
- World Cinema Dramatic Competition – Shayda (Noora Niasari)
- World Cinema Documentary Competition – 20 Days in Mariupol (Mstyslav Chernov)
- NEXT – Kokomo City

=== Directing, Screenwriting and Editing ===
- U.S. Dramatic Competition – Sing J. Lee for The Accidental Getaway Driver
- U.S. Documentary Competition – Luke Lorentzen for A Still Small Voice
- World Cinema Dramatic Competition – Marija Kavtaradze for Slow
- World Cinema Documentary Competition – Anna Hints for Smoke Sauna Sisterhood
- Waldo Salt Screenwriting Award – Maryam Keshavarz for The Persian Version
- Jonathan Oppenheim Editing Award: U.S. Documentary – Daniela I. Quiroz for Going Varsity in Mariachi
- NEXT Innovator Prize – Kokomo City

=== Special Jury Prizes ===
- U.S. Dramatic Special Jury Award: Ensemble Cast – The cast of Theater Camp
- U.S. Dramatic Special Jury Award: Acting – Lío Mehiel for Mutt
- U.S. Dramatic Special Jury Award: Creative Vision – The creative team of Magazine Dreams
- U.S. Documentary Special Jury Award: Clarity of Vision – The Stroll (Kristen Lovell and Zackary Drucke)
- U.S. Documentary Special Jury Award: Freedom of Expression – Bad Press
- World Cinema Dramatic Special Jury Award: Cinematography – Lílis Soares for Mami Wata
- World Cinema Dramatic Special Jury Award: Best Performance – Rosa Marchant for When it Melts
- World Cinema Dramatic Special Jury Award: Creative Vision – Sofia Alaoui for Animalia
- World Cinema Documentary Special Jury Award: Creative Vision – Fantastic Machine
- World Cinema Documentary Special Jury Award: Verité – Against the Tide

=== Short Film Awards ===
- Short Film Grand Jury Prize – When You Left Me on That Boulevard
- Short Film Jury Award: U.S. Fiction – Rest Stop
- Short Film Jury Award: International Fiction – The Kidnapping of the Bride
- Short Film Jury Award: Nonfiction – Will You Look at Me
- Short Film Jury Award: Animation – The Flying Sailor
- Short Film Special Jury Award, International: Directing – AliEN0089 by Valeria Hoffman
- Short Film Special Jury Award, U.S.: Directing – The Vacation by Jarreau Carrillo

=== Special Prizes ===
- Alfred P. Sloan Feature Film Prize – The Pod Generation
- Sundance Institute/Amazon Studios Producers Award for Nonfiction – Jess Devaney for It's Only Life After All
- Sundance Institute/Amazon Studios Producers Award for Fiction – Kara Durrett for The Starling Girl
- Sundance Institute/Adobe Mentorship Award for Editing Nonfiction – Mary Manhardt
- Sundance Institute/Adobe Mentorship Award for Editing Fiction – Troy Takaki
- Sundance Institute/NHK Award – Olive Nwosu for Lady

== Acquisitions ==
- The Deepest Breath: Netflix
- In My Mother's Skin: Amazon Prime Video
- Joyland: Oscilloscope
- My Animal: Paramount Pictures (excluding Canada)
- Other People's Children: Music Box Films
- Run Rabbit Run: Netflix (in select territories)
- Squaring the Circle (The Story of Hipgnosis): Utopia
- Little Richard: I Am Everything: Magnolia Pictures and CNN Films
- Kokomo City: Magnolia Pictures
- Fair Play: Netflix
- Theater Camp: Searchlight Pictures
- Flora and Son: Apple TV+
- Passages: MUBI (including United Kingdom, Ireland and Latin America)
- A Little Prayer: Music Box Films
- Talk to Me: A24
- The Eternal Memory: MTV Documentary Films
- Nam June Paik: Moon Is the Oldest TV: Greenwich Entertainment and PBS Films
- The Persian Version: Sony Pictures Classics
- The Starling Girl: Bleecker Street
- Shayda: Sony Pictures Classics
- Magazine Dreams: Briarcliff Entertainment (then Searchlight Pictures)
- Divinity: Utopia
- Scrapper: Kino Lorber
- Shortcomings: Sony Pictures Classics
- Eileen: Neon
- The Pod Generation: Roadside Attractions and Vertical Entertainment
- Mutt: Strand Releasing
- Sometimes I Think About Dying: Oscilloscope
- Onyx the Fortuitous and the Talisman of Souls: Cinedigm
- Fremont: Music Box Films
- Mami Wata: Dekanalog
- Rotting in the Sun: MUBI
- Fancy Dance: Apple TV+
- Food and Country: Greenwich Entertainment
- To Live and Die and Live: AuthentiQ Films and CinemaStreet Pictures
- It's Only Life After All: Oscilloscope
- A Little Prayer: Music Box Films
- Fairyland: Lionsgate and Willa
