= Cole Doman =

American actor (born 1990)

- Born: March 13, 1993 (age 33); Philadelphia, Pennsylvania
- Occupation: Actor
- Years active: 2015-present

Cole Doman (born March 13, 1993) is an American actor. He made his film debut in Henry Gamble's Birthday Party (2015). He has since starred in Uncle Frank (2020), Mutt (2023), My First Film (2024) and The Mastermind (2025).

== Early life ==
Doman attended School at Steppenwolf. He is gay.

== Career ==
Doman made his feature film debut in Henry Gamble's Birthday Party directed by Stephen Cone.

In 2020, Doman starred in Uncle Frank directed by Alan Ball. That same year, he starred in an episode of Equal for HBO Max.

In 2023, Doman starred in Mutt directed by Vuk Lungulov-Klotz. In 2024, he starred in My First Film directed by Zia Anger. In 2025, Doman appeared in The Mastermind directed by Kelly Reichardt.

On television, Doman appeared in four episodes of Gossip Girl on HBO Max. He will appear in The Savant for Apple TV+.
