= My First Film =

- Promotional poster
- Directed by: Zia Anger
- Written by: Zia Anger; Billy Feldman
- Produced by: Taylor Shung; Riel Roch-Decter
- Starring: Odessa Young; Devon Ross; Cole Doman; Jane Wickline; Seth Steinberg; Sage Ftacek; Abram Kurtz; Jackson Anthony; Philip Ettinger; Sarah Michelson; Ruby Max Fury
- Cinematography: Ashley Connor
- Edited by: Joe Bini; Matthew Hannam
- Music by: Perfume Genius
- Production companies: Memory; Mubi
- Distributed by: Mubi
- Release dates: March 19, 2024 (CPH:DOX); August 30, 2024 (United States); September 6, 2024 (streaming)
- Running time: 100 minutes
- Country: United States
- Language: English

My First Film is a 2024 American drama film directed by Zia Anger, who co-wrote the screenplay with Billy Feldman. A semi-autobiographical film based on Anger's experiences, it stars Odessa Young as a young filmmaker who recounts the struggle to make her first feature film.

The film had its world premiere at CPH:DOX in Copenhagen on March 19, 2024, then had a limited release on August 30 before streaming on Mubi on September 6. It received critical acclaim.

== Cast ==
- Odessa Young as Vita
- Devon Ross as Dina
- Cole Doman as JJ
- Jane Wickline as Alexis
- Philip Ettinger as Dustin
- Eamon Farren as Joe
- Eleanore Hendricks as Sylvia
- Sage Ftacek as Bobby
- Jackson Anthony as Sound Guy
- Seth Steinberg as Sam
- Sarah Michelson as Doctor
- Abram Kurtz as Cash
- Ruby Max Fury as Dad

== Production ==
Between 2010 and 2012, Zia Anger shot her first feature film Always All Ways, Anne Marie with her family and friends as cast and crew, but the project was rejected by multiple film festivals and left as "abandoned" on IMDb. Anger then created an interactive live performance due to her frustration with filmmaking and festivals, using a TextEdit documentary and QuickTime files of the feature film, involving viewers through iMessage and AirDrop.

Anger and Billy Feldman began writing the film's screenplay during the COVID-19 pandemic. Odessa Young, Devon Ross, Cole Doman, Jane Wickline, Philip Ettinger, Eamon Farren, Eleanore Hendricks, Sage Ftacek, Jackson Anthony, Seth Steinberg, Hailey Gates, Sarah Michelson, Abram Kurtz, and Ruby Max Fury joined the cast of the film in November 2022, with Anger set to direct and Mubi set to produce and distribute.

== Release ==
It had its world premiere at CPH:DOX on March 19, 2024. It received a limited release on August 30, 2024, and began streaming on Mubi on September 6, 2024.

== Reception ==
On the review aggregator website Rotten Tomatoes, 91% of 11 critics' reviews are positive, with an average rating of 7.80/10. Metacritic, which uses a weighted average, assigned the film a score of 81 out of 100, based on 6 critics, indicating "universal acclaim".

Natalie Winkelman of IndieWire gave the film an A− and wrote, "My First Film is, at its core, a movie not about upheaval but about yearning, and about how, sometimes, giving that yearning up can be a beautiful, generous act of creation all its own." Richard Brody of The New Yorker praised the film and called it "a masterwork of an artistic coming-of-age and a virtuosic reconception of the art of cinema itself".
