= Murder of Amanda Milan =

2000 murder in New York City

- Location: Port Authority Bus Terminal, New York City, U.S.
- Date: June 20, 2000; 26 years ago
- Attack type: Homicide by stabbing
- Weapon: Knife
- Deaths: 1
- Victim: Amanda Milan
- Perpetrator: Dwayne McCuller
- Charges: Second-degree murder

The murder of Amanda Milan took place on June 20, 2000, when two men killed Milan, a 25-year-old trans woman, in the street near the Port Authority Bus Terminal in New York City. The event provoked outrage within the transgender community, has been remembered in public demonstrations, and discussed in print.

== Murder ==
At 4 a.m. on June 20, 2000, Milan was leaving a group of friends to catch a cab at the bus terminal. During this time, she encountered 20-year-old Dwayne McCuller, who began harassing her. According to witnesses, Milan confronted McCuller for the lewd comments, allegedly stating, "I'm a man too, you want to fight?"—a challenge witnesses report McCuller declined, leading Milan to walk away. However, police reports allege he threatened to shoot and punch Milan before they both disengaged from one another.

As she walked away, another man, later identified as 26-year-old Eugene Celestine, told McCuller that he had a knife. McCuller took the knife and fatally stabbed Milan once in the neck. After falling to the ground, a passerby used her shirt in an attempt to stop Amanda's bleeding. At 4:20 a.m., police arrived and rushed Milan to the hospital. She was pronounced dead at 4:50 a.m.

A third man, later identified as David Anderson, allegedly aided McCuller by letting him hide in his Brooklyn apartment.

== Reaction ==
The murder took place days before the annual LGBT pride parade. Transgender activist Sylvia Rivera worked towards seeing that Milan's death was investigated and organized Milan's political funeral along with other demonstrations claiming a disconnection of transgender rights from the larger LGBT communities. According to queer activist and author Mattilda Bernstein Sycamore "Milan came to symbolize the unfinished business of an LGBT movement that had all too often, 'left transgender people in the back of the bus.'" Because of Milan's murder Rivera reformed a transgender activist group, Street Trans Activist Revolutionaries (STAR). Rivera cited the crime amongst the reasons to add a broad definition of gender to the New York City Human Rights Law.

At a memorial service in Metropolitan Community Church, notable activists including Octavia St. Laurent spoke.

Long-time trans activist Melissa Schlarz explained that since the mid-1970s, she had read about trans women being murdered in Times Square, but "what makes the Milan case significant is that until Amanda Milan no one responded." Schlarz said that usually the newspapers were "dropping hints of transpanic" ambiguously. Schlarz concluded that "Milan has become not a martyr, but a rallying cry. The activism around her death showed the world transgender people belong in the queer community – the message from activists is that there is no difference between Matthew Shepard and Amanda Milan. The response to her death tells the non-queer community: enough, today the violence stops."

According to Benjamin Heim Shepard in Amanda Milan and The Rebirth of Street Trans Activist Revolutionaries the case and the resulting media attention helped "galvanize the transgender community and instigated change".

== Aftermath ==
McCuller was indicted for murder in the second degree. He subsequently pleaded guilty and was sentenced to seventeen and a half years to life in prison.

Anderson was indicted for hindering prosecution in the first degree, and Celestine was indicted for one count each of criminally negligent homicide, criminal facilitation in the fourth degree and criminal possession of a weapon in the fourth degree.

== See also ==
- Murder of Gwen Araujo
- Trans-bashing
- Transgender Day of Remembrance
- Transphobia
- The Stroll (2023 film)
