= Bad Press =

2023 documentary film by Rebecca Landsberry-Baker and Joe Peeler

- Directed by: Rebecca Landsberry-Baker; Joe Peeler
- Produced by: Conrad Beilharz; Garrett F. Baker; Tyler Graim; Rebecca Landsberry-Baker; Joe Peeler
- Cinematography: Tyler Graim
- Edited by: Jean Rheem
- Music by: Denisse Ojeda
- Production companies: Oklafilm; Ford Foundation
- Release dates: January 22, 2023 (Sundance); October 27, 2023 (United States)
- Running time: 98 minutes
- Country: United States
- Languages: English; Mvskoke

Bad Press is a 2023 documentary film directed by Rebecca Landsberry-Baker and Joe Peeler.

== Premise ==
The film centers Angel Ellis with her fellow free press Mvskoke Media reporters and their fight for government transparency and access to information after the censorship of the free press in Muscogee Nation. The National Council voted 7-6 on Thursday 8 November 2018 to repeal its Free Press Act.

== Release ==
Bad Press had its world premiere at the 2023 Sundance Film Festival on January 22, where it won the Special Jury Award for Freedom of Expression. The film was also screened at the 2023 True/False Film Festival. It was released on October 27, 2023.

== Critical reception ==
On the review aggregator website Rotten Tomatoes, 100% of 27 critics' reviews are positive, with an average rating of 7.5/10.
