= Liva Pierce =

Comedian and writer

Liva Pierce is a comedian, writer, and performer. An alum of The Second City, Pierce is one half of the musical comedy duo Dukes with Saturday Night Live cast member Jane Wickline.

== Early life and education ==
Pierce grew up in Portland, Maine, where they attended Casco Bay High School. At CBHS, they founded their high school's first improv troupe. At Deering High School, they played on the school's tennis team, where they raised funds to support hijab-wearing teammates. They attended the University of Chicago, where they studied creative writing and performed with the campus improv team Off-Off Campus. While in Chicago, Pierce also studied at The Second City and performed at venues including iO, the Crowd Theater, and the Revival Theater.

== Career ==
In August 2019, while home in Maine between years at the University of Chicago, Pierce posted a video to Twitter titled "when characters in musicals transition from speaking to singing," a series of openings to invented Broadway numbers. By early 2020, the video had been viewed more than 7.6 million times.

After graduating from the University of Chicago in 2022, Pierce moved to New York City, where they met Wickline while both were performing at open mics. The two became friends on a shared bus ride after a mic in Williamsburg.

=== Dukes ===
Pierce and Wickline perform together as Dukes, a name combining "dykes" and "dudes."

Dukes played a limited Off-Broadway engagement at the SoHo Playhouse from July 8 to August 2, 2026, co-directed by Mabel Lewis and Henry Hornbuckle with production design by Colleen Murray. Reviewing the show for The New Yorker, Emily Nussbaum described it as a buddy comedy about two best friends and roommates with bad jobs, and compared the duo to Flight of the Conchords, The Lonely Island, and Bo Burnham. Vulture named Dukes to its 2026 list of Comedians You Should Know.
