= Lío Mehiel =

American actor and cultural producer

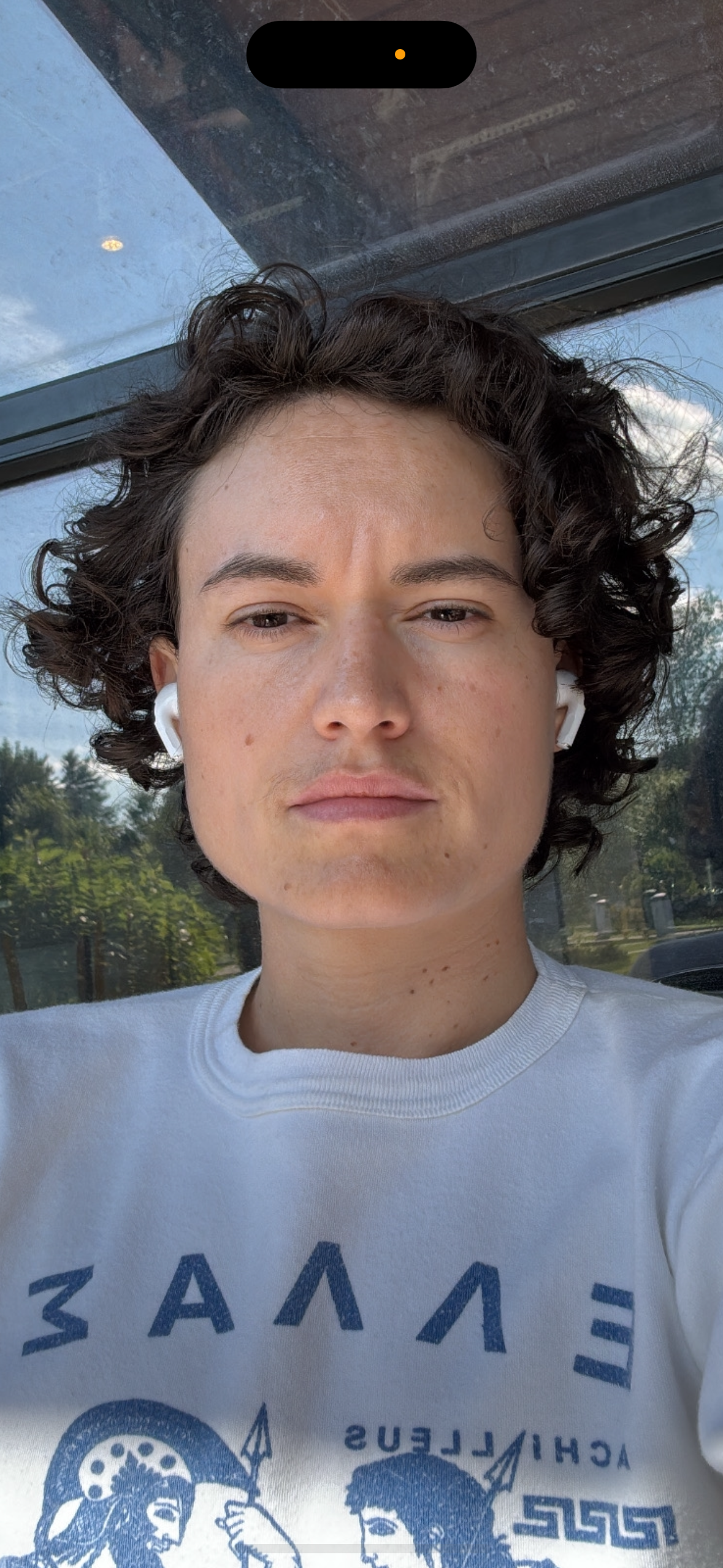
Lío Mehiel at the Williamstown Theater Festival 2025

Lío Mehiel is an American actor and filmmaker from Puerto Rico, most noted for their performances in the films Mutt (2023) and In The Summers (2024).

== Biography ==
Of Greek and Puerto Rican descent, Mehiel lived in Puerto Rico until age 5, when they moved with their family to the mainland United States. They studied theatre at Northwestern University before moving to Los Angeles to pursue work as an actor. They began their career in short films, and had small parts in Dear Evan Hansen (2021) and Tales of the City (2019), before being cast in Mutt (2023) as their first major starring role.

They won the Special Jury Award for Acting in the U.S. Dramatic Competition at the 2023 Sundance Film Festival for Mutt (2023), the first transgender actor ever to win that award.

They returned to Sundance the following year with the film In the Summers (2024).

They have been cast in multiple films with transgender storylines including Vuk Lungulov-Klotz's Mutt (2023) and Leo Behren's short film, SKIN (2023).

== Awards ==
Award	Date	Category	Work	Result	Ref.
Sundance Film Festival	2023	U.S. Dramatic Competition, Special Jury Award for Acting	Mutt	Won	
Canadian Screen Awards	2025	Best Performance in a Live Action Short Drama	Are You Scared to Be Yourself Because You Think That You Might Fail?	Nominated	
