= Nam June Paik: Moon Is the Oldest TV =

Nam June Paik: Moon Is the Oldest TV is a 2023 documentary film by Amanda Kim about video artist Nam June Paik.

== Summary ==
The film traces the life of the artist from his privileged childhood in Japan-occupied Korea up until his death in 2006.

== Production ==
The films uses archival footage, interviews with fellow artists who knew him best and written letters to personal friends John Cage and others narrated by Academy Award-nominated actor Steven Yeun.

== Release ==
It premiered at the 2023 Sundance Film Festival before being acquired by PBS Films and Greenwich Entertainment as an episode of American Masters.
