= In the Turn =

- Theatrical release poster
- Directed by: Erica Tremblay
- Produced by: Bernard Parham
- Cinematography: Bodie Scott-Orman
- Edited by: Dan Litzinger
- Music by: Sam Friedman
- Production company: Homespun Pictures
- Distributed by: Homespun Pictures; Vega, Baby!
- Release date: 2014
- Running time: 95 minutes
- Country: United States
- Language: English

In the Turn is a 2014 documentary film directed by Erica Tremblay. It was produced by Tremblay, Bernard Parham, and Bodie Scott-Orman.

The film won Best New Mavericks Feature at the Atlanta Film Festival and awards at several LGBT film festivals. It was shown at about fifty different film festivals, including Inside Out Toronto LGBT Film Festival, Seattle Lesbian & Gay Film Festival, and the Ottawa International Film Festival.

== Premise ==
Through original documentary filming, interviews, online vlog footage, news footage, and archival audio, In the Turn documents the story of Crystal, a 10-year-old transgender girl living in Timmins, Ontario. After discovering Vagine Regime, a roller derby association, with her mother, she expressed interest in the sport. Her mother wrote a message to the organization which raised money to sponsor Crystal as she traveled to the United States to enroll in a short roller derby camp. The documentary also recounts the stories of several members of Vagine Regime and the general roller derby community. The film features interviews with transgender members of roller derby teams, fans and a referee, who describe how the community has helped them cope with their transitions.

== Reception ==
According to Regan Reid from Vice, the film focuses on the positive effects of the roller derby community rather than the "devastating aspects" of Crystal's life. Instead of concentrating on the struggles faced by members the LBGT community, it explores their day-to-day lives.

The film has received generally positive reviews. According to The Roaming Life, "The film clearly demonstrates the importance of finding a community full of people you can look up to when you’re young and transgender." It describes the film as an example of "the power that cinema can have". Pat Mullen, a member of the Online Film Critics Society, describes the film as an "inspiring and empowering" documentary but criticized its beginning as "a bit unfocused as Tremblay and editor Dan Litzinger crosscut almost too many stories".
