= Milisuthando Bongela =

South African writer and filmmaker

Milisuthando Bongela-Davis
- Born: 1985 (age 40–41); South Africa
- Occupations: Writer, filmmaker, cultural worker, and artist
- Years active: 16 years
- Notable work: Milisuthando

Milisuthando Bongela is a South African writer, filmmaker and artist who is known for her 2023 debut documentary Milisuthando which documents her life growing up in South Africa in the 1980s and 1990s during apartheid and the post-apartheid era. Bongela was born and raised in a Bantustan known as The Republic of Transkei in the 1980s. The Bantustans were self-governing enclaves in South Africa set up by the apartheid regime in the 1950s for Black South African people to live in as their "homelands", separated from white society. The Bantustans were dissolved in the 1990s with the end of apartheid and Bongela and her family moved to a mixed area of South Africa, with Bongela encountering White South Africans for the first time. Bongela narrates the film, in which she describes the racism she experienced in her adolescence growing up with White classmates and friends in a post-apartheid setting. Bongela also describes growing up in the insulated, all-Black Bantustan in which she was not yet fully exposed to racism, nor fully aware of her life in apartheid. Bongela uses Bantu and Xhosa philosophies to frame her experiences. In other parts of the movie, she interviews her White friends, including a producer of the documentary, to understand their experiences in apartheid and interactions with Black South African people.

In 2020, Bongela was one of eleven female filmmakers granted a Women at Sundance/Adobe Fellowship by the Sundance Foundation to help women from historically under-represented peoples in creating their debut movies. A result of the fellowship, the documentary debuted at the 2023 Sundance Film Festival and was screened at the 52nd annual New Directors/New Films Festival hosted by the Lincoln Center and the Museum of Modern Art

Ife Olujobi, writing for The Criterion Collection, stated that the film "raises many questions with no easy answers" while further stating: "Bongela speaks with a clarity and assurance that can only come after processing inner turbulence and arriving at an understanding of yourself and your place in the world..." Writing for The Guardian, Phuong Le stated that Bongela's non-linear narration, while supplementing her monologues with archival historical footage and her own family's photos and movies lent the film a haunting atmosphere. Le further praised the documentary for showing how Bongela's worldview was shattered when she moved out of her sheltered childhood upringing in the all Black Transkei Republic to the overt racism she experienced in post-apartheid South Africa.

Bongela's autobiographical documentary Milisuthando was featured at the 2023 Sundance Film Festival and the Criterion Collection

Bongela was previously a columnist and the Arts and Culture editor for the Mail and Guardian newspaper. Her other writings have appeared in City Press, W Magazine, Aperture, Elle and Colours. She is the co-host of the podcast Umoya: On African Spirituality with Athambile Masola. The podcast explores African spirituality.
