= Jane Wickline =

American comedian (born 1999)

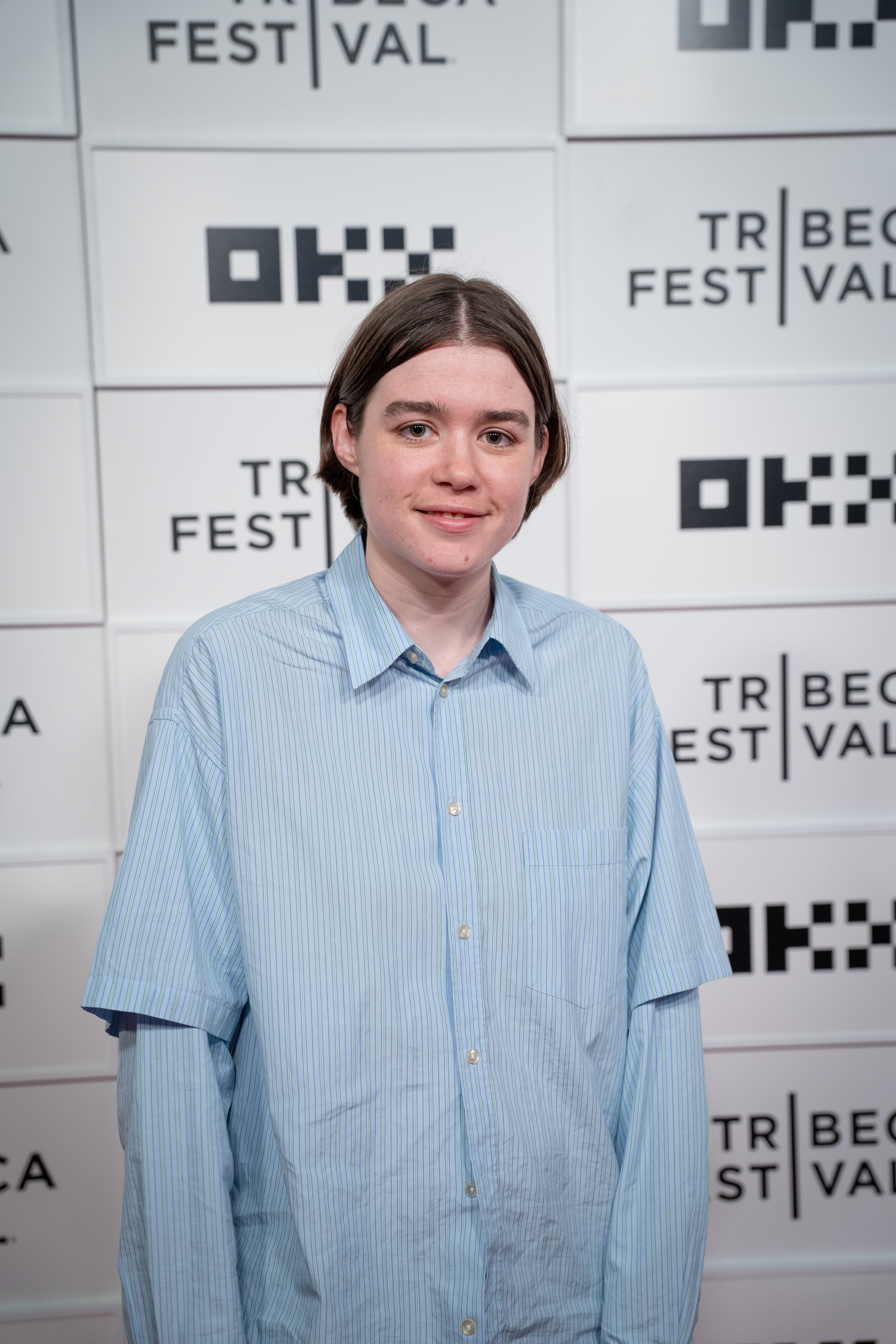
- Wickline at the Tribeca Film Festival in 2026
- Born: July 1, 1999 (age 27)
- Education: Oberlin College (BA)
- Occupations: Actress; comedian; musician
- Years active: 2020–present
- Partner: Henry Hornbuckle (2024–present)
- Father: Matt Wickline

Jane Wickline (born July 1, 1999) is an American actress, comedian, and musician. She first gained attention for her sketch comedy videos on TikTok, where she was known for her deadpan humor. She is one half of the musical sketch duo Dukes with comedian Liva Pierce. In 2026, Wickline started her third season as a Saturday Night Live cast member, her first as a repertory player after two seasons as a featured player, having joined the show in 2024 during its 50th season.

== Early life ==
The eldest of three siblings, Wickline grew up in Los Angeles. She attended Santa Monica High School, where she was active in the school band, playing jazz trumpet and piano. Her high school teachers described her as a "very quiet, very cerebral kind of kid" and an accomplished musician. She graduated in 2017, then attended Oberlin College. Originally planning to study music, her interests shifted toward comedy and writing. While in college, she was the co-head writer for Oberlin's sketch comedy group "Good Talk" and was the editor of the school's satire publication The Grape. She graduated in 2021 with a bachelor's degree in creative writing.

Wickline's mother Marcy Hardart is a pediatrician who worked in television early in her career; at SNL as an assistant to Lorne Michaels from 1987 to 1990 and as a manager at MTV in the early 1990s. Her father is comedy writer Matt Wickline, who was part of Late Night with David Letterman's original writing staff.

== Career ==
Wickline began making comedy videos in late 2020 when Oberlin suspended classes due to the COVID-19 pandemic. She quickly gained a large following on TikTok, becoming known for her minimalist sketches (most often with Wickline playing each character) blending a deadpan delivery and socially awkward characters with surreal humor. After graduating in 2021, she worked as a copy editor in Philadelphia while continuing to post comedy videos on TikTok. In a 2021 interview, when asked about her goals, she said she "would love to write comedy in some capacity". Wickline named the movie Airplane! as one of her major comedy influences, particularly the straitlaced performance of Leslie Nielsen.

After moving to New York City to pursue performing live comedy, Wickline befriended comedian Liva Pierce while both were performing stand-up comedy at the same open mic shows. They formed the musical comedy duo Dukes, which became a fixture at Joe's Pub. Gaining attention for her viral videos on TikTok led to bigger opportunities, landing Wickline a spot as one of the original cast members of Stapleview, launched in 2022 as TikTok's first long-format sketch comedy show. Wickline wrote for "Breaking News: No Laugh Newsroom" on the Dropout network. In early 2024, she co-starred in the indie drama My First Film.

In September 2024, Wickline was announced as a new featured player on Saturday Night Live's 50th season. As of 2026, she has spent two seasons on SNL, where she has become best known for performing her offbeat, satirical songs on Weekend Update. She also recurs alongside Marcello Hernández as "The Couple You Can't Believe Are Together". In September 2026, Wickline returned for her third season, which saw her promoted into the main cast as a repertory player.

Outside of SNL, Wickline continues to tour with Pierce. Their comedy musical Dukes made its off-Broadway debut with a run at the Soho Playhouse in July and August 2026. In September, Vulture named Wickline and Pierce on their "Comics You Should Know" list for 2026.

== Personal life ==
Wickline is in a relationship with theater director Henry Hornbuckle, whom she has worked with in Dukes and other projects for the stage.

== Filmography ==
=== Film ===
Year	Title	Role	Notes
2024	My First Film	Alexis	

=== Television ===
Years	Title	Role	Notes
2022	Stapleview	Sketch performer	
2024–present	Saturday Night Live	Cast member	
