= On Her Shoulders =

2018 documentary film, directed by Alexandria Bombach

- Directed by: Alexandria Bombach
- Produced by: Hayley Pappas; Brock Williams; Elizabeth Schaeffer Brown
- Cinematography: Alexandria Bombach
- Edited by: Alexandria Bombach
- Music by: Patrick Jonsson
- Production company: RYOT Films
- Release date: 20 January 2018 (Sundance)
- Running time: 95 minutes
- Country: United States
- Languages: English; Arabic

On Her Shoulders is a 2018 American documentary film. It was directed by Alexandria Bombach and produced by Hayley Pappas, Brock Williams and Elizabeth Schaeffer Brown under the banner of RYOT Films. The film follows Iraqi Yazidi human rights activist Nadia Murad on her three-month tour of Berlin, New York, and Canada, as she met with politicians and journalists to alert the world to the massacres and kidnapping happening in her native land. In 2014, at the age of 19, Murad had been kidnapped with hundreds of other women and girls by Islamic State of Iraq and the Levant (ISIS) and held as a sex slave; she managed to escape. Also appearing in the film are Barack Obama, Ban Ki-moon, Murad Ismael, Simone Monasebian, Michelle Rempel, Borys Wrzesnewskyj, Ahmed Khudida Burjus, Amal Clooney, and Luis Moreno Ocampo.

The film was released on 20 January 2018 at the Sundance Film Festival, where it won the Documentary Directing Award and the Grand Jury Prize. It received positive critical reviews.

== Background ==
In August 2014, Nadia Murad, aged 19, was captured by ISIS in Iraq along with hundreds of other Yazidi men and women. She and other young women were taken to Mosul, where they were held as sex slaves. Murad later told Time: "I did not want to kill myself – but I wanted them to kill me". In November 2014, she was able to escape after her captors left a door open, and ran away to safety. After the escape, she was transported to a refugee camp.

== Cast ==
- Nadia Murad
- Murad Ismael
- Simone Monasebian
- Michelle Rempel
- Borys Wrzesnewskyj
- Ahmed Khudida Burjus
- Amal Clooney
- Luis Moreno Ocampo
- Barack Obama
- Ki-moon Ban

== Production ==
=== Development ===
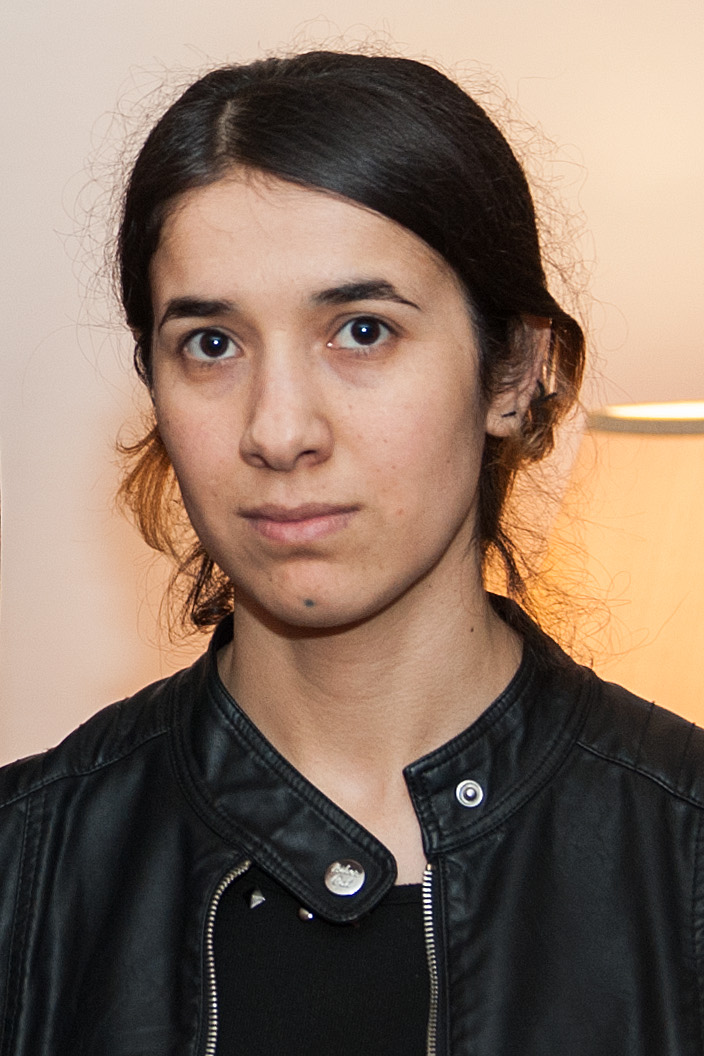
Murad in 2015

RYOT FILMS was introduced to Nadia Murad by the Former ICC Prosecutor Luis Moreno Ocampo and Entrepreneur Elizabeth Schaeffer Brown, who initiated a campaign to bring ISIS to the ICC. In 2015, film director Alexandria Bombach first heard about Murad, after seeing her UN Security Council speech. In July 2016, RYOT Films reached out to Bombach to direct a short film about Murad. Bombach met Murad two weeks later and, after meeting her, she wanted to put her in a feature film "to not only do justice to her story", but also because "[they] were the only ones with the access [to Murad] and so it felt like a huge responsibility to bring justice to it and bring nuance to the issue and to her story". Bombach had to be careful about what she said to the financial staff at RYOT Films, however, as the film company wanted her to produce a short profile, not a feature film.

=== Filming ===
Bombach began filming Murad in 2016. Principal photography took place in Berlin, New York, and Canada over a period of three months, as the crew followed Murad around on her meetings with politicians and journalists in an effort to alert the world to the massacres and kidnapping going on in her native land, in addition the director had no idea what was going to happen day to day.

Bombach said this was the hardest film she had ever made. She added: "It was like losing some humanity myself by not putting the camera down and being able to hug this person". Whilst filming, Bombach recalls, "I had a mic on Nadia for a lot of the time and I was on a long lens, so I was hearing what people were saying to her. Sometimes I wanted to push those people away from her. She never reacted in a way where she seemed frustrated or angry or upset with anyone. She was just so consistently gracious and patient with everyone".

=== Editing ===
Before beginning editing, Bombach received a Skype call from RYOT to confirm that she would be producing a short profile of Murad, and Bombach said she lied to them. She spent the next six weeks editing the film in her parents' garage in Santa Fe, New Mexico. She hired translators to join the editing crew who were familiar with Murad's native language of Kurdish Kurmanji, and worked together with her assistant editor, Michael Bucuzzo; a transcriber, Frank Quatrone; and two translators.

After finishing the editing of the 95-minute film, Bombach called Bryn Mooser, CEO of RYOT Films; she recalls being terrified to confess that she had made a feature film. The phone call lasted about an hour, and in the end, Mooser said yes to a feature film. After receiving the CEO's approval, the editing group did not send the film to the spring film festivals so they could spend more time polishing the editing.

== Release ==
=== Critical reception ===
On the review aggregator Rotten Tomatoes, the film holds an approval rating of 96% based on 54 reviews, and an average rating of 7.9/10. The website's critical consensus reads, "On Her Shoulders traces one woman's incredible journey to offer an inside look at modern political advocacy – and a challenge to viewers yearning to [sic] effect their own change." Metacritic, which uses a weighted average, assigned the film a score of 84 out of 100, based on 18 critics, indicating "Universal acclaim".

Peter Bradshaw of The Guardian said that On Her Shoulders raises significant questions, asking: "has our compassion on international human rights become Malala-ised?" Nell Minow of RogerEbert.com wrote that the director understands that with Murad there are two stories to handle; the first an inspiring story of a young woman who had no goals of becoming a world figure, and the second of the same young woman who is forced to relive her painful experience regularly. David Ehrlich of IndieWire gave the film a 'B+' grade and said that the film is successful in truly informing the audience about the Yazidi genocide. Comparatively, Nigel Andrews of Financial Times wrote that On Her Shoulders is close to awful, and Pat Mullen of P.O.V. said that while the film deserves some attention it feels like "dismissal of her story".

Kenneth Turan of the Los Angeles Times described the film as an "intimate, empathetic, made with discretion and power"; Ed Gibbs of Little White Lies and Jay Weissberg for Variety agreed, saying that it is heartbreaking and powerful. Roger Moore of Movie Nation wrote that Murad's speeches in the film will bring the audience to tears. John DeFore of The Hollywood Reporter, described the film as "a grueling one, full of murder and rape and pleas for the world's attention", but suggests that it "is most likely to find viewers on small screens". Owen Richards of The Arts Desk praised the film's direction, writing that it is an accomplished introduction. Tim Grierson of Screen International also praised the film's direction, he wrote, that "Bombach brings a hopeful but clear-eyed perspective to the material".

=== Accolades ===
Year	Award	Category	Recipient(s)	Result	Ref(s).
2018	SXSW Film Festival	Chicken & Egg Award – Documentary	Alexandria Bombach	Won	
2018	Warsaw International Film Festival	Discoveries Section	Alexandria Bombach	Nominated	
2018	Reykjavík International Film Festival	Best Documentary	Alexandria Bombach	Nominated	
2018	National Board of Review	Freedom of Expression Award	On Her Shoulders	Won	
2018	Nashville Film Festival	Best Documentary Feature	Alexandria Bombach	Nominated	
2018	Jerusalem Film Festival	Best Documentary	Alexandria Bombach	Nominated	
2018	Hot Docs Canadian International Documentary Festival	Docs for Schools Award	Alexandria Bombach	Won	
2018	Hot Docs Canadian International Documentary Festival	Audience Award	Alexandria Bombach	Nominated	
2018	Hollywood Music in Media Awards	Best Original Score – Documentary	Patrick Jonsson	Nominated	
2018	Heartland Film Festival	Grand Prize – Documentary Feature	Alexandria Bombach	Won	
2018	Hamburg Film Festival	Political Film Award	Alexandria Bombach	Won	
2018	Sundance Film Festival	Documentary Directing Award	Alexandria Bombach	Won	
2018	Sundance Film Festival	Grand Jury Prize	Alexandria Bombach	Won	
2018	Dokufest International Documentary and Short Film Festival	Human Rights Award – Special Mention	Alexandria Bombach	Won	
2018	Dokufest International Documentary and Short Film Festival	Human Rights Award – Human Rights Dox	Alexandria Bombach	Nominated	
2018	Dallas International Film Festival	Grand Jury Prize – Documentary Feature	Alexandria Bombach	Nominated	
2018	Cleveland International Film Festival	Greg Gund Memorial Standing Up Award	Alexandria Bombach	Nominated	
2018	Camden International Film Festival	Best Documentary Feature	Alexandria Bombach	Won	
2018	Biografilm Festival	Best Film Unipol Award – International Competition	Alexandria Bombach	Nominated	
2019	Independent Spirit Awards	Best Documentary	Alexandria Bombach, Hayley Pappas, Brock Williams	Nominated	
2019	Independent Spirit Awards	Truer Than Fiction Award	Alexandria Bombach	Nominated	
2019	Documentary Edge Festival	Best International Feature – Honourable Mention	Alexandria Bombach	Won	
2019	Cinema Eye Honors	The Unforgettables	Nadia Murad	Won	
2019	Cinema Eye Honors	Cinema Eye Audience Choice Prize	Alexandria Bombach	Nominated	
