= American Promise (film) =

- Theatrical release poster
- Directed by: Joe Brewster; Michèle Stephenson
- Release date: January 20, 2013 (Sundance)
- Country: United States
- Language: English
- Box office: $94,000

American Promise is a documentary film spanning 13 years from directors Joe Brewster and Michèle Stephenson. The film captures the stories of Brewster and Stephenson's 5-year-old son Idris and his best friend and classmate Seun as these families navigate their way through the rigorous prep-school process and secure admission to the Dalton School. The film is set against the backdrop of a persistent educational achievement gap that dramatically affects African-American boys at all socioeconomic levels across the country. The film's focus shifted based on the experiences that Idris and Seun faced while at Dalton.

American Promise premiered at the 2013 Sundance Film Festival, where it won a special jury award. The filmmakers also launched a national campaign at Sundance to help raise $100,000 and 100,000 volunteer hours for Big Brothers Big Sisters of America Mentoring Brothers in Action program.

== Release ==
The PBS documentary series POV broadcast American Promise in 2013. Random House was set to publish a companion book about the film and the issues it raises in conjunction with the American Promise Campaign.
