= Jari Jones =

Model and LGBTQ rights activist (born 1991)

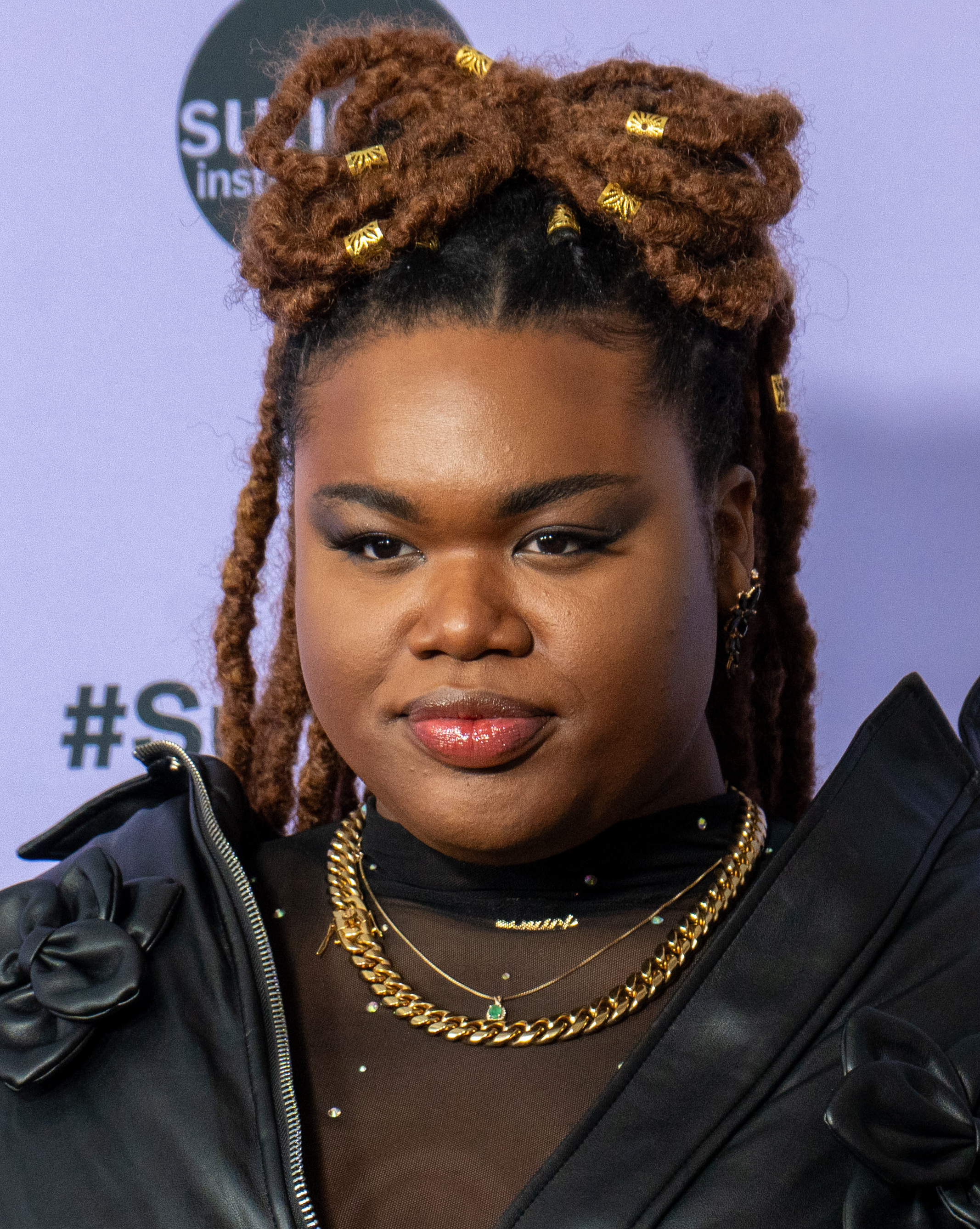
- Jones in 2024
- Born: 1991 (age 34–35); New York, U.S.
- Occupations: Actress; model; LGBTQ rights activist
- Years active: 2018–present

Jari Jones (born 1991) is an American actress, model, producer, and activist. Jones was a cast member, script consultant, acting coach, and producer of Port Authority.

== Career ==
Jones was the first black trans woman producer of a film competing at the Cannes Film Festival. In 2020, Jones was one of the nine faces in Calvin Klein's 2020 pride campaign. Apart from acting, Jones advocates for transgender rights and is part of the Black Lives Matter movement. Jones is a promoter of self-love, Blackness, and femininity. Jones has been featured in New York Fashion Week, becoming the first Black transgender woman to display the No Sesso brand on the runway. Jones has modeled for other brands including Dove in their "Goodbye Judgement, Hello Underarms" campaign and Elizabeth Suzann's "Clothing is Political" campaign. She participated in The Real Catwalk in New York City in 2019. Jones is featured on Calvin Klein's YouTube channel to express her support for LGBTQ+ youth. She is a self-proclaimed, "mom to a whole bunch of queer youth."

She has written for Nylon, The New York Times, Allure, and Out magazine focusing on the representation of queer, transgender, and people of color in the media. She was featured in Netflix's Tales of the City series. She is the first black trans producer to have a film in the Cannes Film Festival. The film, Port Authority, also included the first trans woman of color, Leyna Bloom, in a lead role.

== Filmography ==
=== Film ===
Year	Title	Role	Notes
2019	Adam	Schuyler	
2019	Port Authority	Naima	Also associate producer
2021	On Our Way	Nina	
2023	Mutt	Fiona	

=== Television ===
Year	Title	Role	Notes
2018	Pose	Butt Smack Woman	Episode: "The Fever"
2019	Tales of the City	Ronda	Episode: "Days of Small Surrenders"
2019	Transparent	Skylar	Episode: "Transparent Musicale Finale"
2023–2024	Bob's Burgers	Marshmallow	2 episodes

== See also ==
- LGBT culture in New York City
- List of LGBT people from New York City
