= Going to Mars: The Nikki Giovanni Project =

2023 documentary film by Joe Brewster and Michèle Stephenson

- Official poster
- Directed by: Joe Brewster; Michèle Stephenson
- Produced by: Joe Brewster; Michèle Stephenson; Tommy Oliver
- Cinematography: Greg Harriott; Alfredo Alcántara; Derek Wiesehahn; Shawn Peters
- Edited by: Terra Jean Long; Lawrence Jackman
- Music by: Samora Pinderhudges; Christopher Pattishall
- Production companies: Confluential Films; Rada Studio; JustFilms/Ford Foundation
- Distributed by: HBO Documentary Films
- Release dates: January 20, 2023 (Sundance); November 3, 2023
- Running time: 102 minutes
- Country: United States
- Language: English

Going to Mars: The Nikki Giovanni Project is a 2023 documentary film directed by Joe Brewster and Michèle Stephenson. It explores the life and career of American poet Nikki Giovanni.

It had its world premiere at the 2023 Sundance Film Festival on January 20, and was released in a limited release on November 3 by HBO Documentary Films prior to its broadcast on HBO on January 8, 2024.

== Summary ==
The film covers American poet Nikki Giovanni's life and the historical periods she lived through from the civil rights movement and Black Arts Movement to Black Lives Matter. It was narrated by actress Taraji P. Henson.

== Release ==
The film had its world premiere at the 2023 Sundance Film Festival on January 20. It received the Grand Jury Prize award for U.S. Documentary Competition. The film was also screened at the 2023 True/False Film Festival. In August, HBO Documentary Films acquired U.S. and Canada television and streaming rights to the film. It was released in a limited release on November 3 of the same year. The documentary was broadcast on HBO on January 8, 2024.

== Critical reception ==
On the review aggregator website Rotten Tomatoes, 97% of 31 critics' reviews are positive, with an average rating of 7.3/10. The website's consensus reads: "Going to Mars: The Nikki Giovanni Project takes a suitably inventive -- and very enjoyable -- approach to documenting a brilliant artist's life and times." Metacritic, which uses a weighted average, assigned the film a score of 73 out of 100, based on 8 critics, indicating "generally favorable" reviews. The film was Oscar short-listed in the 96th Oscar Awards and won the prestigious Primetime Emmy Award for Outstanding Exceptional Merit In Documentary Filmmaking (2024).
