= Stateless (film) =

2020 film by Michèle Stephenson

- Directed by: Michèle Stephenson
- Written by: Michèle Stephenson
- Produced by: Jennifer Holness; Lea Marin; Michèle Stephenson; Sudz Sutherland; Joe Brewster
- Edited by: Sophie Farkas Bolla
- Music by: Ben Fox
- Production companies: Hungry Eyes Film & Television
- Distributed by: National Film Board of Canada
- Release date: April 15, 2020 (Tribeca)
- Running time: 97 minutes
- Country: Canada
- Languages: Spanish; Kreyol; English

Stateless is a Canadian documentary film, directed by Michèle Stephenson and released in 2020. The film centres on the crisis of Haitians in the Dominican Republic, many of whom have been left stateless by the Dominican Republic's 2013 decision to strip citizenship from Haitian immigrants and their descendants. Statelessness is a widespread human rights issue in the world, affecting every continent, with unknown millions of people being affected.

The film premiered on April 15, 2020 at the Tribeca Film Festival. It was subsequently screened as part of the 2020 Hot Docs Canadian International Documentary Festival, where it won the special jury prize for Canadian documentaries, and at the BlackStar Film Festival, where it won the award for Best Feature Documentary.

The film received a Canadian Screen Award nomination for Best Feature Length Documentary at the 9th Canadian Screen Awards in 2021, and was a nominee for the DGC Allan King Award for Best Documentary Film at the 2021 Directors Guild of Canada awards.

Stateless is available to watch fully on the National Film Board of Canada's official website.

== Synopsis ==
Directed by Michèle Stephenson, Stateless follows Rosa Iris, a Dominican attorney fighting for the rights of her clients: Dominicans of Haitian descent, but have been stripped of their nationality because of a controversial 2013 citizenship law.

The documentary film also shows the histories of Haiti and the Dominican Republic and the ongoing conflict between the citizens of the two countries that share the island of Hispaniola
