= Fantastic Machine =

2023 documentary film

- Directed by: Axel Danielson; Maximilien Van Aertryck
- Written by: Axel Danielson; Maximilien Van Aertryck
- Produced by: Axel Danielson; Maximilien Van Aertryck
- Narrated by: Maximilien Van Aertryck
- Edited by: Mikel Cee Karlsson
- Production companies: Strand Releasing; Heretic; Plattform Produktion
- Release date: January 23, 2023 (Sundance Film Festival)
- Running time: 92 minutes
- Countries: Sweden; Denmark
- Language: English

Fantastic Machine (also known as And the King Said: What a Fantastic Machine) is a 2023 Swedish-Danish documentary feature directed, produced and edited by Axel Danielson and Maximilien Van Aertryck.

== Synopsis ==
A video essay examination of humanity's obsession with cameras and imagery to the point of changing behaviors in 200 years alongside the social consequences laying ahead via archival footage (including interviews with media mogul Ted Turner and propagandist filmmaker Leni Reifenstahl).

== Release and reception ==
The film debuted at the Sundance Film Festival under the World Cinema Documentary Competition category on January 23, 2023.

=== Accolades ===
It would eventually won a Special Jury Award for Creative Vision.

The film also won two awards (a special mention Youth Jury Crystal Bear and the AG KINO GILDE – CINEMA VISION 14plus) at the 73rd Berlin Film Festival.

== See also ==
- Fake news
- Social effects of television
- Social media
