= Joe Brewster =

American psychiatrist and filmmaker

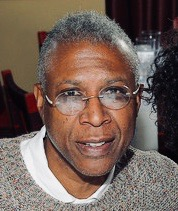

Joe Brewster is an American psychiatrist and filmmaker who directs and produces fiction films, documentaries and new media focused on the experiences of communities of color.

== Education ==
A native of Central Los Angeles, Joe Brewster graduated from Crenshaw High School and received a B.A. in Biology from Stanford University. Brewster went on to Harvard Medical School, where he received his medical degree in 1978 and completed his residency in psychiatry and neurology at McLean Hospital in 1982. After completion of a fellowship in Institutional analysis, the systematic study of people's collective behaviors in institutions, with Dr. Ries Vanderpol, Brewster enrolled in the documentary production program at the New School for Social Research in New York City with a goal to use his documentary film to positively impact institutional behavior.

== Career ==
Brewster wrote and directed his feature film debut The Keeper in 1996, a psychological thriller rooted in his experiences working as a psychiatrist with prisoners and correctional officers at the Brooklyn House of Detention. The Keeper debuted at the Sundance Film Festival and Brewster was nominated for an Independent Spirit Award in the Someone to Watch Award category. Brewster's follow up to The Keeper, The Killing Zone, was inspired by a year he spent working on a Mobile Crisis Team in Harlem, New York.

With partner Michèle Stephenson he founded Rada Studio to tell stories about communities that have been neglected by the mainstream media and contribute to the American narrative mosaic. Together, while raising a family in Brooklyn, New York, Brewster and Stephenson have directed and produced documentary and fiction films. In 2008, they directed Slaying Goliath, a documentary that follows 10 days in the life of their son's fifth grade basketball team from Harlem, New York as they experience culture clash at a national tournament in suburban Florida. Brewster and Stephenson also produced and directed Faces of Change, which follows five activists on five continents fighting racism in their communities.

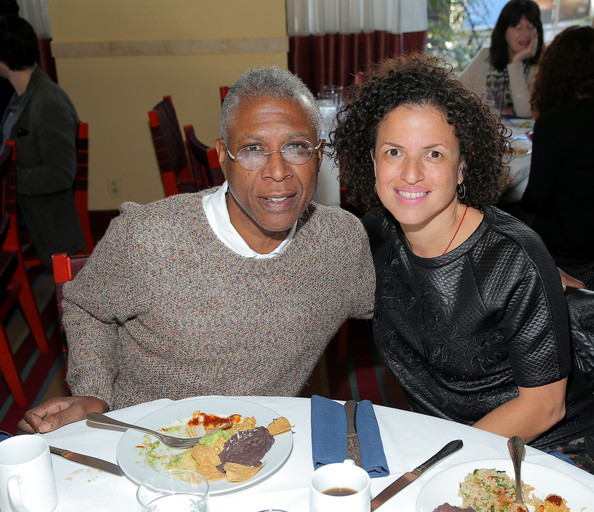
Joe Brewster and Michele Stephenson

In 1999, Brewster and Stephenson set out to document the experiences of their son and his best friend from the time both boys entered kindergarten at the Dalton School through their high school graduation in 2012. Their goal was to closely examine the coming of age and school experiences of two middle class African American boys at a predominantly white school in the context of the persistent U.S. achievement gap. American Promise is slated for broadcast on POV in 2013. Brewster and Stephenson are Sundance Institute Fellows, Tribeca All Access Fellows and the recipients of the Tribeca Gucci Fund for Documentary Film for the 12-year longitudinal documentary. American Promise is the centerpiece of a transmedia engagement campaign that uses mobile web and interactive technology to help propel young men of color to success. American Promise was nominated for three Emmys and its outreach campaign received the Puma Award as the for one of the world's top outreach campaigns for 2013. he American Promise premiered at the 2013 Sundance Film Festival where it won the Special Jury Prize for Excellence in Filmmaking and was also part of the 2013 New York Film Festival's Main Slate. American Promise has received the Full Frame Festival Grand Jury Prize, Hot Springs Film Festival Best Documentary, and the Henry Wickham Impact Award. Brewster and his wife were also honored with an NAACP Image Award for their companion book, Promises Kept: Raising Black Boys to Succeed in School and in Life.

Brewster and Stephenson changed the company name to Rada Studio in 2016 to reflect the evolution, scope and growth of their work over the past 25 years. The filmmaker couple now produces, directs and develops content in the United States, Canada and Mexico that includes branded content, film documentary, and immersive media. The company has co-produced and directed three immersive works including The Changing Same VR, an immersive magical-realist time-travel experience through 400 years of African-American history. The Changing Same won a prize at the prestigious 2021 Tribeca Festival for Best Narrative experience.

== Filmography select ==
- The Keeper - 1996 - Narrative - Producer/Director
- The Killing Zone - 2001 - Narrative - Producer/Director
- Faces of Change - 2003 - Producer
- Slaying Goliath - 2004 - POV/PBS - Producer/Director
- American Promise - 2013 - Producer/Director
- New York Times, The Conversation Series on Race 2016-2016 - Producer Director
- The Changing Same Documentary Short POV/PBS - 2019
- Stateless - Producer - PBS/POV 2020
- Elena - Documentary Short - VICE/World Channel - 2021
- The Changing Same (Virtual Reality- Narrative) - Producer Director - 2021
- O-Dogg (Virtual Reality Narrative - Producer Director - 2021
- Going to Mars: The Nikki Giovanni Project - Producer Director - 2022
- Play - Documentary Short - Producer Director - 2022

== Awards (Selective) ==
- 1996 — Spirit Award Nomination - Someone To Watch Award (runner-up) The Keeper
- 2008 — Grand Jury Prize for Best Documentary at American Black Film Festival for Slaying Goliath
- 2009 — Tribeca All-Access Fellowship for Michele Stephenson & Joe Brewster
- 2013 — Special Jury Prize at Sundance Film Festival for American Promise
- 2013 — Grand Jury Prize at Full Frame Film Festival for American Promise
- 2014 — Puma Award for Best Outreach Campaign Worldwide for American Promise
- 2015 — (3) Emmy Nomination for American Promise - Best Editing, Best Documentary & News for American Promise
- 2015 — NAACP Image Award for Best Informational book - Promises Kept: Raising Black Boys
- 2016 — Guggenheim Fellowship Award for Joe Brewster
- 2020 — Nominated for a Canadian Academy Award for Best Feature Documentary with Stateless
- 2020 — Best Short Documentary Jury Prize at Blackstar Film Festival for Elena
- 2021 — Best Immersive Awards at Tribeca Film Festival for The Changing Same VR
- 2022 — Nomination Emmy for Outstanding Interactive Media: Innovation for The Changing Same VR, EP1
- 2022 — Joe Brewster invited to American Academy of Arts and Sciences - Documentary Branch
- 2023 — Best Short Documentary Jury Prize at Tribeca Festival 2023 for Black Girls Play
- 2023 — Grand Jury Prize at Sundance Film Festival 2023 for Going To Mars
- 2023 — Rogue Award at the Ashland Independent Film Festival for Going To Mars
- 2023 — Outstanding Documentary Feature Prize at Frameline Film Festival 2023 for Going To Mars
- 2023 — Best Feature Film at Detroit Free Press Film Festival for Going To Mars
- 2024 — Rada Studio Nominated for five Cinema Eye Awards; Wins three for Going To Mars and Black Girls
- 2024 — Oscar Short-List for Black Girls Play: The Story of Hand Games
- 2024 — Oscar Short-List for Going To Mars: The Nikki Giovanni Project
- 2024 — Edward R. Murrow Award for Best Video for Black Girls Play: The Story of Hand Games
- 2024 — Emmy Award for Outstanding Exceptional Merit in Documentary Filmmaking for Going To Mars: The Nikki Giovanni Project
