= Fancy Dance (film) =

2023 film by Erica Tremblay

- Release poster
- Directed by: Erica Tremblay
- Written by: Erica Tremblay; Miciana Alise
- Produced by: Deidre Backs; Erica Tremblay; Heather Rae; Nina Yang Bongiovi; Tommy Oliver
- Starring: Lily Gladstone; Isabel DeRoy-Olson; Ryan Begay; Crystle Lightning; Audrey Wasilewski; Shea Whigham
- Cinematography: Carolina Costa
- Edited by: Robert Grigsby Wilson
- Music by: Samantha Crain
- Production companies: Confluential Films; Significant Productions; AUM Group
- Distributed by: Apple Original Films (through Apple TV+)
- Release dates: January 20, 2023 (Sundance); June 21, 2024 (United States)
- Running time: 90 minutes
- Country: United States
- Languages: English; Cayuga
- Box office: $16,677

Fancy Dance is a 2023 American drama film directed by Erica Tremblay (in her feature directorial debut), from a screenplay written by Tremblay and Miciana Alise. It stars Lily Gladstone, Isabel DeRoy-Olson and Shea Whigham.

Fancy Dance premiered at the 2023 Sundance Film Festival on January 20, 2023. It began a limited theatrical release in the United States on June 21, 2024, prior to streaming on Apple TV+ on June 28.

== Plot ==
Since her sister Tawi's disappearance two weeks ago, Jax has cared for her 13-year-old niece Roki on the Seneca–Cayuga reservation. Jax and Roki are unable to make the Indian tribal police or the FBI open a missing persons case for Tawi, as Tawi has a history of disappearing unexpectedly. The two get by mostly by stealing cars and selling them to Boo, a trader running a convenience store and scrapyard on the reservation. Jax discovers that Tawi dealt methamphetamine in the oil workers' camp on behalf of Boo. Child protective services and Indian Child Welfare authorities place Roki into protective guardianship with her estranged white grandfather Frank when they find out about Jax's criminal record. Frank and his wife are sympathetic to Roki, but are unwilling to let her live with Jax on the reservation or attend powwow this year. Jax sneaks into Frank’s house and takes her niece back, stealing Frank’s car. She promises Roki that they will meet Tawi at the powwow in Oklahoma City.

Because the reservation is under federal jurisdiction, Frank and his wife file an abduction report in the morning with the FBI. At a shopping mall, Roki steals the car keys and a Ruger pistol from a customer’s handbag. In a phone call, Jax's half-brother JJ, who serves with Indian tribal police, tells Jax that Tawi was seen some time ago at the home of Boo's mother in Tulsa. Roki overhears their conversation, in which Jax admits to JJ that she knows Tawi will not be at the powwow and is likely already dead. Jax detours to Tulsa to speak with Boo's mother, and finds out that Tawi used to come by in a red pickup truck.

When an attendant at a filling station in Shawnee recognises Jax from abduction alerts in the media and wants to notify the police, Roki threatens him with the stolen handgun, accidentally discharging it and wounding the attendant in the shoulder. While fleeing from the police, Roki confronts Jax about the danger Jax has put her in over the past two days, and for lying about her mother being at the powwow before running away. JJ locates the red pickup in Boo's scrapyard.

A remorseful Frank calls Jax and tells her that the police have found Tawi's corpse in a nearby lake. Realizing that Roki did not go with the police, Jax races to the Oklahoma City powwow. The film closes with Jax and Roki dancing together in the annual Missing and Murdered Relatives Indigenous dance, as one police officer at the ceremony recognizes Jax and alerts his colleagues over the radio.

== Cast ==
- Lily Gladstone as Jax
- Isabel DeRoy-Olson as Roki
- Shea Whigham as Frank
- Audrey Wasilewski as Nancy
- Ryan Begay as JJ
- Crystle Lightning as Sapphire
- Dennis Newman as Derrick
- Tamara Podemski as Ricky

== Production ==
In December 2020, the screenplay of Fancy Dance was selected as one of The Indigenous List, initiated by The Black List, IllumiNative and Sundance Institute to spotlight the work of Native American writers. In May 2022, the screenplay also was featured in the Cannes Screenplay List.

In August 2022, it was announced that Erica Tremblay would direct the film, with Confluential Films and Tommy Oliver financing and producing. The principal photography took place in both Tulsa and Grove, Oklahoma in August 2022.

== Release ==
Fancy Dance had its world premiere at the 2023 Sundance Film Festival, on January 20, 2023. It also screened at the 2023 South by Southwest, and at the 2023 NewFest.

Cercamon acquired worldwide sales rights to the film on February 16, 2023. In February 2024, Apple TV+ acquired distribution rights to the film, with plans to release it later in the year. It was released in a limited theatrical release in the United States on June 21, 2024, prior to streaming on Apple TV+ on June 28, 2024.

== Reception ==
On the review aggregator website Rotten Tomatoes, 96% of 124 critics' reviews are positive, with an average rating of 7.4/10. The website's consensus reads: "An urgent drama grounded in its observant depiction of reservation life, Fancy Dance establishes director/co-writer Erica Tremblay as a rising filmmaking talent." Metacritic, which uses a weighted average, assigned the film a score of 77 out of 100, based on 25 critics, indicating "generally favorable" reviews.
