= The Stroll (2023 film) =

2023 documentary film directed by Kristen Lovell and Zackary Drucker

- Directed by: Kristen Lovell; Zackary Drucker
- Produced by: Matt Wolf
- Cinematography: Sara Kinney
- Edited by: Mel Mel Sukekawa Mooring
- Music by: James Newberry; Jordi Nus
- Production companies: HBO Documentary Films; Polari Pictures; Kingdom Reign Entertainment
- Distributed by: HBO
- Release dates: January 23, 2023 (Sundance); June 21, 2023 (HBO, Max and Crave)
- Running time: 84 minutes
- Country: United States
- Language: English

The Stroll is a 2023 American documentary film, directed by Kristen Lovell and Zackary Drucker. The film documents trans history in New York City, from the perspective of Black and Latina trans women who had been sex workers in the Meatpacking District during the 1980s and 1990s, in an area known as The Stroll.

The film had its world premiere at the 2023 Sundance Film Festival on January 23, 2023 and won a special jury prize for clarity of vision. HBO released the film on June 21, 2023.

== Plot ==
The documentary focuses on trans history from the perspective of Black and Latina trans women who had been sex workers in the Meatpacking District in New York City during the 1980s and 1990s, in a place referred to as "The Stroll," during the time period before the area became gentrified.

The film incorporates archival video and news footage as well as photographs. Trans women who survived the 1980s and 1990s in New York City provide an oral history through interviews in the film. Archival footage includes RuPaul visiting the area with a film crew.

The film also includes a focus on the murder of Amanda Milan, a Black trans woman sex worker who was killed in Times Square in 2000, the media response and the mobilization of the trans community that followed.

The film concludes with a June 2020 gathering of 15,000 people listening to Ceyenne Doroshow announce the success of a fundraiser to support housing for Black trans people.

== Production ==
Kristen Lovell began documenting her experience as a sex worker in the Meatpacking District in New York City during the 1990s, while she was living in a youth shelter and enrolled in a media training program. In an interview with the Los Angeles Times, she explained, "I was the only Black trans woman in our cohort of young people, so I would tell them about what was going on on 14th Street." Lovell continued sex work after she became ineligible for youth housing due to her age, and was unable to find other employment. Lovell continued to collect archival footage, and later found work at the nonprofit youth shelter Sylvia's Place.

The Stroll is the directorial debut for Lovell, and in 2020 she met with Zackary Drucker, who had experience with documentaries about trans women and became the co-director for the film. Drucker told the Los Angeles Times, "This is a history that I have experienced as passed down through stories with my elders. Coming into trans life in the early 2000s, I really couldn't find myself in any organized realm of history in many books." The archival producer Olivia Streisand contributed further material to the archival collection used in the film.

== Release ==
The film had its world premiere at the 2023 Sundance Film Festival on January 23, 2023, and won a special jury award for clarity of vision. It opened the 37th BFI Flare: London LGBTIQ+ Film Festival in March 2023. It also screened at Hot Docs Canadian International Film Festival on April 29, 2023.

HBO released the film on June 21, 2023. The film was also released on Crave in Canada on June 21, 2023.

== Reception ==
The Stroll has received positive reviews from film critics. In a RogerEbert.com review, Brandon Towns described the film as "riveting," and writes, "From both a technical and political standpoint, “The Stroll” is a tremendous achievement." According to David Rooney in a review for The Hollywood Reporter, "one of the captivating paradoxes of Kristen Lovell and Zackary Drucker’s lovingly assembled chapter of queer history is that while it never downplays the marginalization, persecution and physical danger of being a trans woman of color making a living through sex work, it gives equal time to the resilience, the sense of community, the proud sisterhood and shared survival skills that flourished on that block long before social justice activists were taking up the “Trans Lives Matter” cause."

Jude Dry writes in a review for IndieWire, "The film takes its title from the block of 14th street between Ninth Avenue and the Hudson River where many once found their trade, which the gals called The Stroll. In interviews with many women formerly "in the life," dating from the 1970s through the early aughts, The Stroll captures the essence of what it must have been like to walk the stroll." In a review for Paste Magazine, B. Panther writes, "For a long time, most documentaries about trans lives were spiritually dishonest because it was usually an outsider coming in with an agenda. But with this film, Lovell joins the impressive collection of transgender history films like Kokomo City, which give trans women - trans sex workers in particular - access to show and tell their own stories."

Fionnuala Halligan writes in a review for Screen Daily, "It is, in a way, a companion piece to 2017's The Death And Life Of Marsha P. Johnson, which was picked up by Netflix and became a vital reference point in the continuing struggle for transgender rights." Chris Vognar writes in a review for Rolling Stone, "in its own way, the film stands with Midnight Cowboy and Taxi Driver as a stark portrait of the naked city as it used to be. Lovell may know better than to overly romanticize this time and place, but she also knows there was something vivid, real, and, most important for these purposes, cinematic about her old haunts."

The Stroll is a New York Times Critic's Pick, and a review by Devika Girish states, "if The Stroll is an indictment and elegy, it is also a remarkable document of the self-determination of the women and workers who learned, in the face of the worst odds, to fend for themselves and each other." Guy Lodge writes in a review for Variety, "This is a trans history project created by, and in service of, the trans community - a community that can collectively account for why its story merits telling, even if it's fractured and fragmented today," and "it continually honors the dignity with which women like Ceyenne, Egyptt, Lady P and Tabytha - and Lovell too - have confronted a world that would have much rather ignored if not outright erased them."

== See also ==
- Marsha P. Johnson
- Murder of Amanda Milan
- Sylvia Rivera
