= Kristen Lovell =

American filmmaker and activist

Kristen Parker Lovell (born c. 1980) is an American trans rights activist, filmmaker, and former sex worker. After experiencing homelessness as a teenager in New York City during the late 1990s and early 2000s, Lovell went on to work for various organisations advocating for the rights of trans people and sex workers. After studying filmmaking at Lincoln Center, she went on to co-direct the documentary film The Stroll (2023), based in part on her experiences as a sex worker.

== Early life ==
Lovell was born and raised in Yonkers, New York. When she was a teenager, she came out as a trans woman and subsequently moved to New York City, where she lived in a Covenant House for homeless teenagers in Manhattan. After finding work at a coffee shop, Lovell began transitioning at the age of 15. After losing her job as a result of her transition, she began doing "survival" sex work in the Meatpacking District. Lovell primarily worked on 14th Street between Ninth Avenue and the Hudson River, in an area that was informally known as the Stroll, and had within it a high number of black trans sex workers. Lovell worked on the Stroll between 1999 and 2005, citing a lack of other employment opportunities for queer and trans people at the time, and using her income to pay her rent while completing unpaid internships.

Lovell was arrested over forty times during her time as a sex worker, and was frequently held on Rikers Island. She successfully sued the New York City Police Department after she was handcuffed to a pole in a jail cell for two days.

== Activism ==
Lovell co-founded the grassroots organisation FIERCE which advocated for young queer people of colour. During the late 1990s and early 2000s, FIERCE campaigned ultimately unsuccessfully against the gentrification of the Meatpacking District, which Lovell stated was forcing queer and trans people from the area. Lovell subsequently spent 10 years working at Sylvia Rivera's Place, an emergency shelter and support service for LGBTQIA people in New York City. She went on to work as a programme co-ordinator for the Metropolitan Community Church of New York.

In 2013, Lovell supported the family of Islan Nettles, a black trans woman who had been beaten to death in Harlem; despite her killer having handed himself in to the police three days after the attack, it took over a year for him to be indicted, with him ultimately being charged with manslaughter. Lovell was critical of the NYPD's handling of the case and what she considered to be his lenient sentence.

Lovell is a vocal supporter of sex workers' rights, and campaigned for the repeal of New York's 1976 anti-loitering law, often referred to as the "walking while trans" law due to what critics described as it being used by the police to target and harass law-abiding trans people. Lovell stated publicly that she had been arrested "dozens" of times under the law. When the Governor of New York, Andrew Cuomo, repealed the law in 2021, she described the decision "monumental" for the trans community. Lovell has advocated for the legalisation of sex work, while also calling on more funding to allow trans women to leave sex work, should they wish to.

At the 2023 Now Awards, Lovell received the Visionary Award in recognition of her activism and filmmaking.

== Filmmaking career ==
In 2007, Lovell was featured in the documentary film Queer Street, where she was interviewed about her experiences as a queer homeless youth. Lovell subsequently stated her discomfort at the film being made by non-queer filmmakers inspired her to tell trans stories from her own trans perspective.

Lovell first purchased a camera while doing sex work in the Meatpacking District, and used it to document her experiences, as well as those of other sex workers working on the Stroll. Lovell stated that she tried to capture the "essence" of her experience, including doing sex work, experiencing discrimination as both a sex worker and a black trans woman, and also sharing a camaraderie with other sex workers.

Lovell went on to study at the Artists Academy at Lincoln Center, where she had a small role in the drama film The Garden Left Behind (2019). Lovell also produced the film, and its director, Flavio Alves, stated that Lovell's experiences of living life as a trans woman led to him changing his script to better represent the experiences of trans people. Lovell also had a guest role in the sketch comedy series Random Acts of Flyness (2018).

=== The Stroll (2023) ===
By 2018, Lovell had started organising an archive of her footage from her years on the Stroll. She met filmmaker Matt Wolf at the 2018 Whitney Biennial, who helped Lovell develop her idea of making a documentary film about the experiences of sex workers from the Stroll, and pitched the film to executives at HBO. Wolf introduced Lovell to documentarian Zackary Drucker in 2020, who co-directed The Stroll with Lovell; Wolf served as producer. Lovell described the film as an attempt to reclaim her history, as well as to tell the story of the Meatpacking District prior to its gentrification. She also saw it as a document of trans history, bridging the gap between activists like Sylvia River and Marsha P. Johnson and the present day.

The Stroll premiered at the 2023 Sundance Film Festival, where it won a special jury prize for "clarity of vision". The film aired on HBO in the United States on 21 June 2023.
