= Alexandria Bombach =

American filmmaker

Alexandria Bombach is an American filmmaker.

== Career ==
Bombach is from Santa Fe, New Mexico. They graduated from Fort Lewis College in Durango, Colorado. In 2009, they founded the production company, Red Reel. Their first film, 23 Feet (2011), "captures people doing what they love outside," and raised $9,785 on Kickstarter. In 2012, they produced and directed the documentary film series MoveShake, a "look into the complicated lives of people who have set out to make a positive environmental or social impact." Their first feature documentary, Frame by Frame, co-directed with Mo Scarpelli, premiered at SXSW in 2015. Also in 2015, Bombach released an 18-minute documentary entitled Common Ground, which dealt with disputes over unprotected public land in Montana. In 2016, Bombach received Pulitzer Center support for The New York Times "op-doc" Afghanistan by Choice, which, like Frame by Frame, was filmed in Afghanistan.

In 2018, Bombach premiered their documentary On Her Shoulders, about Yazidi genocide survivor and activist Nadia Murad, at the Sundance Film Festival. On Her Shoulders won the festival's award for Best Directing of a U.S. Documentary. The same year, Bombach signed with United Talent Agency.

In 2023, Bombach directed It's Only Life After All revolving around the band Indigo Girls.

== Filmography ==
As director

- 2012 - Shannon Galpin: A MoveShake Story
- 2012 - Julio Solis: A MoveShake Story
- 2013 - Gregg Treinish: A MoveShake Story
- 2013 - Alison Gannett: A MoveShake Story
- 2013-2016 - Natural Heroes
- 2015 - Frame by Frame
- 2018 - On Her Shoulders
- 2023 - It's Only Life After All
