= Sarah Michelson =

British choreographer and dancer (born 1964)

- Born: 1964 (age 61–62); Manchester, United Kingdom
- Occupation: Choreographer/Dancer

Sarah Michelson (born 1964) is a British choreographer and dancer who lives and works in New York City, New York. Her work is characterized by demanding physicality and repetition, rigorous formal structures, and inventive lighting and sound design. She was one of two choreographers whose work was included in the 2012 Whitney Biennial, the first time dance was presented as part of the bi-annual exhibition. Her work has also been staged at The Walker Art Center, Jacob’s Pillow Dance Festival, The Kitchen, and the White Oak Dance Project. She received New York Dance and Performance awards (known as "The Bessie Awards") for Group Experience (2002), Shadowmann Parts One and Two (2003), and Dogs (2008). She has served as associate director of The Center for Movement Research and associate curator of dance at The Kitchen. Currently choreographer in residence at Bard's Fisher Center, she is the recipient of their four-year fellowship to develop a commissioned work with Bard students and professional dancers.

== Early life and education ==
Michelson was born in Manchester, United Kingdom, and trained in dance at the Trinity Laban Centre in London and the Merce Cunningham Studio in New York City. She earned a B.A. in Literature from London University, Goldsmiths College, in 1984 and an MFA in Fiction Writing from Mills College in 1990.

== Work ==
Known for highly technical and demanding choreography that draws from influences as wide-ranging as classical ballet, Merce Cunningham, and Judson Dance Theater, Michelson's work has been staged in and commissioned by both traditional dance venues and contemporary arts institutions and museums.

Writing about Michelson's work in 2002, dance critic Gia Kourlas noted, "She neither allows her dancers to hide their sweat and struggle (in her view, it seems, dancing should never look easy), nor does she permit them to improvise. Even though her movement may appear haphazard, everything is planned, right down to the direction of the eyes."

== Recognition and awards ==
Michelson was selected from the group of 2012 Whitney Biennial artists to receive the exhibition's Bucksbaum Award for her piece Devotion Study #1—The American Dancer. Bucksbaum awardees mount a subsequent solo exhibition at the museum; Michelson's work, 4, was presented there in 2014. She has also received a Rockefeller MAP Fund Grant and a New York Foundation for the Arts grant in 2004, Jerome Foundation grants in 2005 and 2006, a Herb Alpert Award in the Arts and a Creative Capital Award in 2006, a Foundation for Contemporary Arts Grants to Artists award in 2008, a Guggenheim Fellowship in 2009, and the Doris Duke Artist Award in 2012.

== Works ==
- Miami 3XLA, The Kitchen, New York, NY (1999)
- Blister Me, Dixon Place, New York, NY (2000)
- Aut Norm, Performance Space 122, New York, NY (2000)
- I'm in Fawn, The Kitchen, New York, NY (2001)
- Group Experience, Performance Space 122, New York, NY (2001)
- Grivdon at the Grivdon Concrete, The Kitchen, New York, NY (2002)
- The Experts, White Oak Dance Project, New York, NY (2002)
- Grivdon at the Grivdon Lawn, Jacob’s Pillow Dance Festival, Becket, MA (2002)
- The Apartment, 857 5th Avenue, NY (2003)
- Shadowmann, The Kitchen (Part 1) and Performance Space 122 (Part 2), New York; Tanz im August, Berlin, Germany; Zurich Theatre Spektakel Festival; the Venice Biennale; SommerSzene, Salzburg, Austria; The Cutting Edge Festival, Frankfurt, Germany (2003–04)
- Love is Everything, Lyon Opera Ballet (Commissioner), Lyon, France (2005)
- Daylight, Performance Space 122 (Co-commissioner), NY, and On the Boards, Seattle, WA (2005)
- Daylight (for Minneapolis), Walker Art Center, (Commissioner) Minneapolis, MN (2005)
- Swan Lake, Transitions Dance Company (Commissioner), Laban Centre, London (2006)
- DOGS, Brooklyn Academy of Music Next Wave Festival, New York, NY (2006), and Tanz im August Berlin, The Hebbel Theater in Berlin (2007)
- Dover Beach, Chapter Arts, Cardiff, Wales, UK (2008), and The Kitchen, New York, NY (2009)
- Devotion, The Kitchen, New York, NY; Walker Art Center, Minneapolis, MN; ODC Theater, San Francisco, CA; and On The Boards, Seattle, WA (2011)
- Devotion Study #1—The American Dancer, The Whitney Museum of American Art, New York, NY (2012)
- Not a Lecture/Performance, Crossing the Line Festival, FIAF, New York, NY (2012)
- Devotion Study #3—Untitled, Museum of Modern Art, New York, NY (2012)
- 4, The Whitney Museum of American Art, New York, NY (2014)
- tournamento, Walker Art Center, Minneapolis, MN (2015)
