= Axel Danielson (director) =

Swedish documentary film director, and producer

- Born: 1976; Vittskövle, Sweden
- Occupation(s): Director, producer
- Years active: 2004–present

Axel Danielson is a Swedish film director and producer.

== Life and career ==
Danielson was born in Vittskövle, Sweden. He worked as a firefighter in Kristianstad for three years before film studies at the Valand Academy in Gothenburg. In 2012 he founded the master program Cinematic Processes at the Valand Academy. His graduation film was Summer Clouds (Sommarlek), which won an award at the Tallinn Black Nights Film Festival. He is the co-owner of the production company Plattform Produktion.

Danielson's first feature documentary film Twin Brothers - 53 Scenes in Chronological Order (Pangpangbröder), premiered at the International Film Festival Rotterdam in 2011. In 2016, he co-directed Ten Meter Tower (Hopptornet), along with Maximilien Van Aertryck, which premiered at the Berlin International Film Festival and was shortlisted for an Academy Award for Best Documentary Short film. In 2023, he co-directed And the King Said, What a Fantastic Machine, together with his long-term collaborator Maximilien Van Aertryck, which premiered at the Sundance Film Festival.

== Filmography ==
Year	Title	Contribution	Note
2023	And the King Said, What a Fantastic Machine	Director, writer and producer	Documentary
2023	Liv	Editor	Documentary
2021	Jobs for All! (Arbete åt Alla!)	Director	1 episode
2018	A Good Week for Democracy	Editor and producer	Documentary
2016	Because the World Never Stops	Director, writer, editor, cinematographer and producer	Documentary
2016	Fight on a Swedish Beach!!	Editor and producer	Documentary
2016	Ten Meter Tower (Hopptornet)	Director, editor, cinematographer and producer	Documentary
2016	Extramaterial	Writer and editor	Documentary
2011	Twin Brothers - 53 Scenes in Chronological Order (Pangpangbröder)	Director, writer, editor and cinematographer	Documentary
2004	Summer Clouds (Sommarlek)	Director	Short film

== Awards and nominations ==
Year	Result	Award	Category	Work	Ref.
2023	Won	Sundance Film Festival	Special Jury Award: Creative Vision	Fantastic Machine	
2023	Won	Berlin International Film Festival	AG Kino Gilde - Cinema Vision 14plus and Special mention	Fantastic Machine	
2023	Won	Seattle International Film Festival	Youth Jury Prize For Best Futurewave Feature	Fantastic Machine	
2022	Won	Clermont ISFF	Audience Award	Jobs for All! (Arbete åt Alla!)	
2018	Nominated	News and Documentary Emmy Awards	Outstanding New Approaches: Documentary	Ten Meter Tower (Hopptornet)	
2018	Nominated	Cinema Eye Honors	Outstanding Achievement in Nonfiction Short Filmmaking	Ten Meter Tower (Hopptornet)	
2017	Won	Traverse City Film Festival	Best Documentary Short Film	Ten Meter Tower (Hopptornet)	
2017	Won	Nantucket Film Festival	Best Short Film	Ten Meter Tower (Hopptornet)	
2017	Nominated	Guldbagge Awards	Best Short Film	Because the World Never Stops	
2016	Won	Ji.hlava IDFF	Best European Documentary Short	Ten Meter Tower (Hopptornet)	
2016	Won	Gothenburg Film Festival	Best Swedish short	Ten Meter Tower (Hopptornet)	
2005	Won	Tallinn Black Nights Film Festival	Sleepwalkers Grand Prize	Summer Clouds (Sommarlek)	
