= Samara Nohra =

Lebanese actress

- سمارة نهرا
- Occupation: Actress

Samara Nohra (Arabic: سمارة نهرا) is a Lebanese actress.

== Filmography ==
=== Film ===
- Halal Love - Jeannette. 2015
- I Offered You Pleasure - Saada (Short). 2011

=== Television ===
- Al Mouaallima Wal Oustaz. 1980
- Itiham - Walid's mother. 2014
- Mesh Ana 2016

=== Dubbing roles ===
- Belle and Sebastian
- Maya the Honey Bee
- Snorks
- The Smurfs - Smurfette
- Toy Story 2 - Mrs. Potato Head (Classical Arabic version)
- Toy Story 3 - Mrs. Potato Head (Classical Arabic version)
