= Mutt (film) =

2023 film by Vuk Lungulov-Klotz

- Theatrical release poster
- Directed by: Vuk Lungulov-Klotz
- Written by: Vuk Lungulov-Klotz
- Produced by: Vuk Lungulov-Klotz; Alexander Stegmaier; Stephen Scott Scarpulla; Jennifer Kuczaj; Joel Michaely
- Starring: Lío Mehiel; Cole Doman; Mimi Ryder; Alejandro Goic
- Cinematography: Matthew Pothier
- Edited by: Adam Dicterow
- Music by: James William Blades; Taul Katz
- Production companies: Strange Animal Entertainment; Mongoose Picture House; Aspire Studios; Lucky 12 Productions; Spark Features
- Distributed by: Strand Releasing
- Release dates: January 23, 2023 (Sundance); August 18, 2023
- Running time: 87 minutes
- Country: United States
- Languages: English; Spanish

Mutt is a 2023 drama film directed, written and produced by Vuk Lungulov-Klotz in his feature directorial debut. It stars Lío Mehiel, Cole Doman, Alejandro Goic and MiMi Ryder.

The film had its world premiere at the 2023 Sundance Film Festival on January 23, 2023, where actor Lío Mehiel won the Sundance Dramatic Special Jury Award for Best Acting. This made Mehiel the first openly trans actor to win that award.

It was released on August 18, 2023, by Strand Releasing.

== Premise ==
In one day, Feña, a trans man, rekindles his relationships with his foreign father, his straight ex-boyfriend and his estranged younger half-sister after having lost touch with them since his gender transition.

== Cast ==
- Lío Mehiel as Feña, a trans man in his 20s
- Cole Doman as John, Feña's straight ex-boyfriend
- MiMi Ryder as Zoe, Feña's estranged younger half-sister
- Alejandro Goic as Pablo, Feña's father
- Sarah Herrman as Jenny, a young woman Feña meets in a night club who's also John's cousin
- Jari Jones as Fiona, Feña's roommate
- Jasai Chase Owens as Aidan, Feña's friend
- Ben Groh as Mark, Feña's friend

== Production ==
During the Deadline Studio panel at Sundance Film Festival, Lungulov-Klotz revealed that he wrote the script of Mutt six years prior and recalled the experience as "trying to place all of his fears in the film". The principal photography began at the start of fall 2022.

== Release ==
Mutt had its world premiere at the 2023 Sundance Film Festival, on January 23, 2023. At the premiere, the film screened with open captions after jury walkout due to a captioning malfunction three days prior. The film had its international premiere during the Generation 14plus program at the 73rd Berlin International Film Festival and won a Special Mention award. In April 2023, Strand Releasing acquired distribution rights to the film. It was released on August 18, 2023.

== Reception ==
On review aggregator website Rotten Tomatoes, the film has an approval rating of 89% based on 45 reviews, with an average rating of 7.4/10.

Leslie Felperin of The Hollywood Reporter deemed Mutt as "one of the best films about post-transition adjustment".
