= It's Only Life After All =

2023 film by Alexandria Bombach

- Theatrical release poster
- Directed by: Alexandria Bombach
- Produced by: Alexandria Bombach; Jess Devaney; Anya Rous; Kathlyn Horan
- Cinematography: Alexandria Bombach; J Bennett; Erick Stoll
- Edited by: Alexandria Bombach
- Production companies: Impact Partners; InMaat Productions; Multitude Films; Chicken & Egg Pictures; Tin Fish Films; Red Reel
- Distributed by: Oscilloscope
- Release dates: January 19, 2023 (Sundance); April 10, 2024
- Running time: 123 minutes
- Country: United States
- Language: English
- Box office: $228,790

It's Only Life After All is a 2023 American documentary film, directed, produced, and edited by Alexandria Bombach. It follows the lives and careers of the band Indigo Girls. It had its world premiere at the 2023 Sundance Film Festival on January 19, 2023, and was released on April 10, 2024, by Oscilloscope.

== Premise ==
Explores the lives, careers, and activism of the band Indigo Girls.

== Production ==
In May 2020, it was announced Alexandria Bombach would direct a documentary film revolving around Indigo Girls. Initially the documentary was set to follow the band on tour in a Cinéma vérité style, but the COVID-19 pandemic changed the way the film was made. During post-production, Bombach had 1,000 hours of footage to work with.

== Release ==
It's Only Life After All had its world premiere at the 2023 Sundance Film Festival on January 19, 2023. It also screened at South by Southwest on March 14, 2023. and Tribeca Festival on June 14, 2023. In December 2023, Oscilloscope acquired distribution rights to the film. It was released on April 10, 2024.

== Reception ==
=== Critical reception ===
On the review aggregator website Rotten Tomatoes, 92% of 26 critics' reviews are positive, with an average rating of 7.00/10. The website's consensus reads: "A frank and candid overview of the duo's long partnership, Indigo Girls: It's Only Life After All should prove fascinating for longtime fans as well as the unconverted." Metacritic, which uses a weighted average, assigned the film a score of 71 out of 100, based on 9 critics, indicating "generally favorable" reviews.

Robyn Bahr of The Hollywood Reporter wrote: "The rare confessional rockumentary that envelops you like a soft blanket." Jude Dry of IndieWire gave the film a B+ writing: "Brimming with previously unseen footage and refreshingly frank interviews with the artists, it’s an adoring opus befitting two long overlooked musicians and activists."
