= T (2023 film) =

2023 film directed by Jitesh Kumar Parida

- Directed by: Jitesh Kumar Parida
- Written by: Jitesh Kumar Parida; Jitendra Rai; Kuwar Shakti Singh
- Produced by: Jitesh Kumar Parida; Jitendra Rai; Himadri Tanaya Das (co-producer); Mohit Kumar Puri (co-producer); Vighnaharta Movies (co-producer); Debashish Sahu (Associate Producer)
- Starring: Debasish Sahu; Prasanjeet Mohapatra; Usasi Misra; Ranbeeir Kalsi; Hara Rath
- Cinematography: Sarbeswar Dash
- Edited by: Amarjit Ojha
- Music by: Tuhin K Biswas
- Production company: Jitesh Kumar Films
- Release date: May 25, 2023
- Country: India
- Language: Odia

T is a 2023 Indian Odia-language Biography film directed by Jitesh Kumar Parida, starring Debasish Sahoo, Prasanjeet Mohapatra, Usasi Misra, Ranbeeir Kalsi and Hara Rath. The film is a biography based on India's first transgender taxi driver, Meghna Sahoo.

== Plot ==
Meghna, born as Vishnu, is subjected to abuse for exhibiting feminine behavior. She later turns to sex work in the Kinnar locality to explore her sexuality. After getting a corporate job, Meghna is terminated when her transgender identity is discovered. She undergoes sex reassignment surgery and starts working as India's first transgender taxi driver. Meghna becomes an advocate for the Kinnar community and engages in social work to help improve their lives. Despite facing opposition and violence, Meghna remains dedicated to her cause and becomes a leader of her community.

== Cast ==
- Debasish Sahoo
- Prasanjeet Mohapatra
- Usasi Misra
- Ranbeeir Kalsi
- Hara Rath

== Production ==
The trailer and poster of social film T was showcased at the India pavilion during the 75th Cannes Film Festival. The film was released on 25 May 2023.
