= Norwegian Dream (film) =

2023 International LGBTQ+ romantic drama film

- Theatrical film poster
- Norwegian: Den norske drømmen
- Directed by: Leiv Igor Devold
- Written by: Justyna Bilik; Gjermund Gisvold; Radoslaw Paczocha
- Produced by: Håvard Wettland Gossé
- Starring: Hubert Miłkowski; Karl Bekele Steinland
- Cinematography: Patryk Kin
- Edited by: Øyvinn Haugrud Kastnes; Ida Vennerød Kolstø; Tomasz Maczka
- Music by: Florian Tessloff
- Release dates: March 6, 2023 (Kosmorama); March 17, 2023 (Norway); February 1, 2024 (Germany); February 16, 2024 (Poland)
- Running time: 97 minutes
- Countries: Germany; Norway; Poland
- Languages: English; Norwegian; Polish

Norwegian Dream (Norwegian: Den norske drømmen) is a 2023 Norwegian–Polish–German LGBTQ+ romantic drama film, directed by Leiv Igor Devold. The film stars Hubert Miłkowski and Karl Bekele Steinland. It premiered at the Kosmorama in 2023, before being released throughout Norway a week later.

== Synopsis ==
A 19-year-old Polish immigrant working at a fish factory in Norway has feelings for his colleague. A strike begins among the Polish workers at the factory testing their relationship and with their fellow workers.

== Cast ==
- Hubert Miłkowski as Robert
- Karl Bekele Steinland as Ivar
- Edyta Torhan as Maria
- Øyvind Brandtzæg as Bjorn
- Jakub Sierenberg as Marek
- Izabella Dudziak as Julia
- Simonas Dovidauskas as Vytautas
- Jakub Nosiadek as Oktawian

== Reception ==
On the review aggregator website Rotten Tomatoes, 100% of 5 critics' reviews are positive, with an average rating of 6.30/10.

Phil Hoad of The Guardian rated it 3/5 stars and lauded the performances: "Karl Bekele Steinland has a haughty presence in his role, but doesn’t get to explore his dark side; unlike Hubert Miłkowski, who looks like a young Christian Slater, and impressively graduates from pent-up impotence to anguished self-recrimination." Mansel Stimpson of Film Review Daily graded it 3.5/5 stars, and praised the director: "What really counts is that its two leading players deliver so effectively while in addition the skill of much of the filmmaking reveals Leiv Igor Devold to be a talent to watch."

Rich Cline of Shadows on the Wall gave it 3.5/5 stars and also commended the acting: "Milkowski has terrific screen presence as a young man who is escaping violent bigotry back home and is still afraid of his shadow. His wariness remains even as he begins to feel safe with Ivar, who is played with open-handed charm by the charismatic Steinland." Ben Turner of The Pink Lens scored it 3/5 and remarked: "The boys are certainly endearing enough and watching their chemistry makes for charming viewing, but this is well-trod territory."

Brandon Judell of An Injustice Magazine mused on the narrative importance: "As for this being another 'coming-out film', there’s seems to be more and more of a need for such plotlines. As Armistead Maupin noted: 'The world changes in direct proportion to the number of people willing to be honest about their lives.' [This film] will be an incentive for many more to do so." Dennis Harvey of the San Francisco Bay Guardian lamented over its screenplay: "But its script by three writers sometimes feels over-laden with narrative agenda items, insufficiently ballasted by rooting value."
