= Michèle Stephenson =

Haitian filmmaker

- Education: McGill University; Columbia Law School
- Occupations: Director, producer
- Spouse: Joe Brewster

Michèle Stephenson is a Haitian-Panamanian filmmaker and former human rights attorney.

== Career ==
With spouse Joe Brewster, Stephenson founded the Rada Film Group. While raising a family in Brooklyn, New York, they directed and produced documentary and fiction films. In 1999, Brewster and Stephenson set out to document the experiences of their son and his best friend as both boys entered kindergarten at a private Manhattan prep school up until their high school graduation in 2012 in the documentary film, American Promise. Their goal was to closely examine the coming-of-age and school experiences of two middle-class African American boys at The Dalton School, a predominantly white prep school, in the context of the persistent U.S. achievement gap. American Promise was broadcast on POV in 2013 and received multiple awards for its impact on education and race discourse. Alongside the film, Stephenson co-authored Promises Kept: Raising Black Boys to Succeed in School and in Life, a companion book that examines systemic educational disparities and strategies for supporting Black students.

In 2008, she directed Slaying Goliath, a documentary following 10 days in the life of her son's Harlem-based fifth-grade basketball team at a national tournament in suburban Florida. She and Brewster also produced and directed Faces of Change, which follows five activists on five continents fighting racism in their communities.

In 2021, she co-directed The Changing Same, a VR trilogy that uses magical realism to explore cycles of racial terror in America. The project, which premiered at the Sundance Film Festival’s New Frontier XR Program, was lauded for its innovative use of immersive storytelling and received festival honors for its narrative approach to historical trauma. In 2023, she co-directed Going to Mars: The Nikki Giovanni Project, a documentary examining the life and work of poet and activist Nikki Giovanni. The film blends archival footage, poetry, and science-fiction-inspired elements to reflect on the legacy of Black radical thought. It gained widespread recognition on the festival circuit and was celebrated for its innovative narrative style. That same year, she co-directed Black Girls Play: The Story of Hand Games, which explores the cultural significance of hand games in Black girlhood, tracing their origins from African traditions to their role in contemporary American life. The film was widely praised for its historical and cultural significance and received notable awards in documentary filmmaking.

Stephenson is a member of the Academy of Motion Picture Arts and Sciences and has been recognized as a Guggenheim Fellow, a Creative Capital Artist, and a recipient of the Chicken & Egg Pictures Filmmaker Breakthrough Award. She continues to explore innovative storytelling methods through her work in virtual reality and experimental cinema, expanding the ways in which Black stories are told across the Americas and the Black diaspora. Her latest documentary film, True North, premiered at the 2025 Toronto International Film Festival.

== Awards and recognition ==
American Promise premiered at the 2013 Sundance Film Festival, where it won the Special Jury Prize for Excellence in Filmmaking, and was also part of the 2013 New York Film Festival's Main Slate. The film received the Full Frame Festival Grand Jury Prize, Hot Springs Film Festival Best Documentary Award, and the PUMA Britdoc Impact Award. Stephenson and her husband, Joe Brewster, were honored with an NAACP Image Award for their companion book, Promises Kept: Raising Black Boys to Succeed in School and in Life.

In 2016, she was awarded a Guggenheim Fellowship for exceptional creative ability in the arts. In 2018, she received the Anonymous Was A Woman Award, which recognizes and supports women artists over the age of 40. Her 2020 documentary, Stateless, was a nominee for Best Feature Length Documentary at the 9th Canadian Screen Awards in 2021.

Her co-directed immersive project, The Changing Same (2021), a magical realist VR trilogy, premiered at the Sundance Film Festival’s New Frontier XR Program and won the Grand Jury Prize for Best Immersive Narrative at the Tribeca Film Festival. It was also nominated for an Emmy Award for Outstanding Interactive Media: Immersive.

In 2023, Stephenson’s film Going to Mars: The Nikki Giovanni Project won the Grand Jury Prize at the Sundance Film Festival and was shortlisted for the Academy Awards. The film also won the Creative Arts Emmy for Exceptional Merit in Documentary Filmmaking. That same year, her documentary Black Girls Play: The Story of Hand Games was also Oscar-shortlisted, winning the Edward R. Murrow Award for Excellence in Video and Best Short Documentary at Tribeca.

In 2024, she received the NYWIFT Nancy Malone Muse Directing Award. Stephenson is also a Creative Capital Artist, a recipient of the Chicken & Egg Pictures Filmmaker Breakthrough Award, and a member of the Academy of Motion Picture Arts and Sciences.

== Pledge ==
In September 2025, she signed an open pledge with Film Workers for Palestine pledging not to work with Israeli film institutions "that are implicated in genocide and apartheid against the Palestinian people."
