= Elizabeth Suzann =

Clothing manufacturing company

- Industry: Fashion
- Founded: 2013; 12 years ago
- Founder: Elizabeth Pape
- Headquarters: Tennessee, United States
- Website: elizabethsuzann.com

Elizabeth Suzann was a slow fashion, direct-to-consumer clothing company founded in 2013. It was based in Nashville, Tennessee. After peaking as an operation with 42 employees and a 10,000-foot warehouse, the company announced its closure in April 2020, due to financial difficulties including the emerging COVID-19 pandemic. In December 2020, the founder opened a new business operating as Elizabeth Suzann Studio, staffed only by the founder and one assistant in a backyard workshop.

== Background ==
Elizabeth Pape, the founder and CEO of Elizabeth Suzann, started making clothing items in her spare bedroom and selling them through an online Etsy store, before launching the Elizabeth Suzann line in late 2013. About a year after launching, the brand reached $1 million in sales. As of 2017, Elizabeth Suzann clothing was manufactured in a warehouse in Nashville that had an in-house sewing staff, cutters, and fulfillment employees.

On January 2, 2017, Pape wrote a blog post that detailed the cost of a garment from the Elizabeth Suzann line and compared it with the cost of a garment from a fast fashion retailer. Later that year, she appeared on an episode of the EconTalk podcast to explain the financial challenges behind running a profitable fashion brand while staying within the slow fashion movement.

== Products ==
Elizabeth Suzann and Elizabeth Suzann Studio have focused on minimalist and neutral basics made from natural fibers including linen, silk, and cotton.

== Popularity ==
Brittany Howard of the Alabama Shakes rock band said she was a fan of the Elizabeth Suzann brand.
