= Erica Tremblay =

Native American film director (born 1980)

- Born: 1980 (age 45–46); Oklahoma, United States
- Citizenship: Seneca-Cayuga Nation and U.S.
- Education: Missouri State University
- Occupation: Film director
- Years active: 2011–present
- Notable work: In the Turn (2014); Fancy Dance (2023)

Erica Tremblay (born 1980) is a Native American filmmaker from the Seneca–Cayuga Nation.

Tremblay's debut feature film, Fancy Dance (2023), featured Academy Award nominee Lily Gladstone and premiered at Sundance. She also wrote and directed on FX's Emmy-nominated television series Reservation Dogs and AMC's Dark Winds.

== Early life and education ==
Tremblay was born in 1980 in Oklahoma. She grew up in a Seneca–Cayuga community near the Oklahoma–Missouri border, where her mother served on the tribal council. She is a citizen of the Seneca-Cayuga Nation.

Tremblay attended Missouri State University (formerly Southwest Missouri State). Initially studying broadcast journalism, she switched her major to media studies after discovering the work of women directors and realizing she could pursue a career in filmmaking. She graduated with a degree in journalism and media.

== Career ==
Tremblay began her career in 2007 after moving to Lincoln, Nebraska, where she made her first documentary film, Tiny Red Universe (2007), serving as writer and director. The short film aired on IFC.

In 2012, Tremblay released Heartland: A Portrait of Survival. The documentary was shown at the Omaha Film Festival, and at the St. Louis International Film Festival. Two years later, she released In the Turn, a documentary film that revolves around Crystal, a ten-year-old transgender girl from Timmins, Ontario. During this period, Tremblay also worked closely with grassroots organizations like the National Indigenous Women’s Resource Center and Wica Agli, using film as a tool for advocacy on issues such as violence against Indigenous women and restorative justice. In 2017, she joined Bustle as director of video. Before joining that magazine, she worked for Hearst Digital Media.

In 2018, Tremblay was selected for the Sundance Institute's Native Filmmakers Lab, a development program for emerging Indigenous filmmakers. Through the lab, she developed Little Chief which featured Academy Award nominee Lily Gladstone and premiered at the 2020 Sundance Film Festival. Shortly after, she made a personal decision to deepen her cultural engagement by moving to Six Nations Reserve in Ontario, Canada, to study the Cayuga language. She spent three years in an immersive language program, studying her ancestral language and connecting with her community.

Transitioning into television, Tremblay contributed to the writing and directing of groundbreaking Indigenous-led series. She joined the creative team of Reservation Dogs (2021–2023), the FX comedy-drama about Native youth in Oklahoma created by Sterlin Harjo and Taika Waititi. On Reservation Dogs, Tremblay served as a co-producer, writer, and director on multiple episodes, helping to shape the show’s honest and humorous portrayal of modern Native American life. She also wrote and directed for the AMC series Dark Winds, a noir thriller centered on Navajo Nation law enforcement, contributing to Seasons 1, 3 and 4. In April 2023, the first episode of the first season, "Monster Slayer", of Dark Winds was honored as an Outstanding Fictional Television Drama by the Western Heritage Awards of the National Cowboy & Western Heritage Museum. In May 2023, Dark Winds received several Vision Awards from the National Association for Multi-ethnicity in Communications (NAMIC). It received the award for Best Drama, and for Best Performance in a Drama Series, awarded to Zahn McClarnon.

In 2023, Tremblay made her feature film directorial debut with Fancy Dance, which she wrote, directed, and produced. Fancy Dance premiered at the 2023 Sundance Film Festival and was met with critical acclaim for balancing its heartbreaking subject matter with moments of humor and hope drawn from Native resilience. It also screened at the 2023 South by Southwest, and at the 2023 NewFest. It was supported in part by the Cherokee Nation film initiative. The film was acquired by Apple Original Films in 2024. In 2026 Tremblay directed an episode of the Netflix series Little House on the Prairie.

== Personal life ==
Tremblay is queer. She is based in Ithaca, where she lives on the original lands of the Seneca Cayuga Nation.

== Awards and recognition ==
- Native Arts and Cultures Foundation Fellowship (2016): Awarded a National Artist Fellowship from the Native Arts and Cultures Foundation, recognizing her as an emerging Native filmmaker.
- Sundance Institute Native Filmmakers Lab Fellow (2018): Selected by the Sundance Indigenous Program to develop Little Chief, which later premiered at Sundance Film Festival.
- 2021 Sundance Screenwriters Lab Fellow
- 2021 Sundance Directors Lab Fellow
- Native American 40 Under 40: Honored as one of the "40 Under 40" outstanding Native Americans (late 2010s) for her contributions to media and community.
- Lynn Shelton "Of a Certain Age" Grant (2021): Received a $25,000 film grant from the Northwest Film Forum in memory of director Lynn Shelton, awarded to support Fancy Dance as Tremblay's first narrative feature project.
- BAFTA Breakthrough USA (2024): Named a BAFTA Breakthrough artist in 2024 by the British Academy of Film and Television Arts.

== Filmography ==
=== Films ===
List of film appearances, with year, title, type, and role shown
Year	Title	Type	Role
2007	Tiny Red Universe	Documentary	Writer, Director, Producer
2012	Heartland: Portrait of Survival	Documentary	Writer, Director, Producer
2014	In the Turn	Documentary	Writer, Director, Producer
2020	Little Chief	Short Film	Writer, Director, Producer
2023	Fancy Dance	Feature Film	Writer, Director, Producer

=== Television ===
List of television works by Tremblay, with year, title, role, and network
Year	Title	Writer	Director	Executive producer	Network
2021–2023	Reservation Dogs	Yes	Yes	Co-producer	FX
2022–present	Dark Winds	Yes	Yes	Co-executive	AMC
2026	Little House on the Prairie	No	Yes	No	Netflix
