= Vuk Lungulov-Klotz =

Vuk Lungulov-Klotz (born 1994 in New York City) is a Chilean–American film director.

== Life and career ==
Vuk Lungulov-Klotz was born in 1994 in New York City to Maria Isabel Klotz, a Chilean painter, and Darko Lungulov, a Serbian filmmaker. The filmmaker grew up mainly in Chile, and spent a fair amount in New York and Serbia. At the age of 18, he returned to the United States from Chile to attend SUNY Purchase Film Conservatory, where he graduated in 2016. At the age of 23, he participated in the Screenwriter's Lab of the Sundance Institute.

His trans-themed short film Still Liam, which features Liam, a trans man who works at a gas station before transitioning, was released in select United States theaters in May 2016. The film shows his experiences in everyday life from his point of view and in comparison to how the world sees him. In this student film, Liam is embodied by two different actors, a trans man and a cis man.

His feature film drama Mutt, for which he developed the screenplay as part of the Sundance Institute Labs, premiered in January 2023 at the 2023 Sundance Film Festival. In February 2023, the film was shown at the Berlin International Film Festival. In Mutt, he tells the story of Feña, a young trans man, over the course of a single hectic day in New York City, when three people from his past come back into his life.

Lungulov-Klotz was selected to be one of 2023's twelve BAFTA Breakthrough USA participants.

== Personal life ==
Lungulov-Klotz lives in Brooklyn. He worked in grip and electrical roles for eight years before becoming a director on his first feature film.

== Filmography ==
- 2016: Still Liam (short film)
- 2019: Welcome Back, Lenny (short film)
- 2021: River Fork (short film)
- 2023: Mutt

== Awards ==
Berlin International Film Festival

- 2023: Honorable Mention in the section Generation 14plus (Mutt)

Sundance Film Festival

- 2023: Nominated for the Grand Jury Prize – Dramatic (Mutt)

Seattle International Film Festival

- 2023: Grand Jury Prize – New American Cinema (Mutt)

Pink Apple Queer Film Festival

- 2023: Winner – International Competition (Mutt)

Mix México Film Festival

- 2023: Grand Jury Prize – Mariposa Award(Mutt)

Connecticut LGBTQ Film Festival

- 2023: Jury Award – Best Feature (Mutt)

Mix Milano Film Festival

- 2023: Best Feature Film
