= Abortion in Switzerland =

Abortion in Switzerland is legal during the first 12 weeks of pregnancy, upon condition of counseling, for women who state that they are in distress. It is also legal with medical indications – threat of severe physical or psychological damage to the woman – at any later time. Switzerland is among the developed nations with the lowest rates of abortions and unwanted pregnancies.

Abortion was legalized by popular vote in 2002, after its criminal prohibition had ceased to be observed in practice for some time. In 2014, Swiss voters rejected an initiative to remove the coverage of abortions by the public health insurance system.

Persons performing illegal abortions are subject to a monetary penalty or imprisonment of up to five years. A pregnant woman who procures an illegal abortion is also subject to a monetary penalty or imprisonment of up to three years.

== Legal history ==
Up until 2002, legal abortion was technically available in Switzerland only with restrictive medical indications. A constitutional amendment to legalise abortion in the first trimester had been narrowly defeated in a popular referendum in 1977. However, in 1978 and 1985, initiatives for constitutional amendments aimed at making abortion harder to obtain were defeated by a wide margin at the ballot box.

The criminal ban of elective abortions essentially stopped being enforced towards the end of the 20th century. Abortions could be easily obtained through the cooperation of physicians, especially in the more urban cantons. In March 2001, the Swiss Federal Assembly approved a change to the penal code providing for the first trimester rule outlined above.

Since October 2002, abortions are legal until the 12th week of pregnancy. The woman has to sign a declaration that she is in any kind of distress, and that she wishes to end the pregnancy. The doctor must confirm that he or she has handed out an information leaflet containing a register of help desks, associations that provide moral and material support to the woman, and he must inform her of the possibility to give the child up for adoption. After the 12th week, a doctor must confirm that the bodily or psychological health of the pregnant woman would impacted by carrying out the pregnancy.

Girls under 16 years need counselling at a specialized help center before an abortion is carried out. In no case does an underage woman need to inform family members or receive their approval for an abortion.

Conservative parties and interest groups collected the 50,000 voters' signatures required to force a popular referendum on the amendment. The vote was held on 2 June 2002, with 72.2% of Swiss voters supporting the change in law.

Legal abortions are now covered by Switzerland's universal healthcare system. Insured women can opt out from this coverage, but this does not reduce their insurance fees. A popular initiative started by conservative groups to suppress the coverage of abortion costs by the public health insurance system was rejected by about 70% of Swiss voters on 9 February 2014. Another initiative intended to prohibit abortions altogether failed to gather the required 100,000 signatures in 2014.

== Statistics ==
In 2005, the abortion rate was 7 out of 1,000 women aged 15–44 in the country, or 6 out of 1,000 women aged 15 to 19. 95% of abortions took place within the first trimester, and about half of the women who had an abortion also had Swiss citizenship. As of 2010, the abortion rate was 7.1 abortions per 1000 women aged 15–44, including abortions on women not residing in Switzerland.

The Swiss abortion rate dropped from around 12 per thousand in the 1970s, when data first became available, to around 8 in the 1990s. It has remained stable at around 7 during the 2000s. In 2013 the rate had dropped still further to 6.4 per 1000. This remarkably low rate compared to countries such as the UK (17.5), France (15) or the U.S. (16) has been attributed to a low rate of unwanted pregnancies due to widespread sex education, wide use of contraception (including morning-after pills available without prescription) and Switzerland's relatively high socioeconomic level.

Abortion in Liechtenstein, which borders Switzerland, remains mostly illegal. Some women who choose to terminate an unwanted pregnancy cross the border into Austria or Switzerland to undergo the procedure.

In 2020, 11,143 abortions were carried out, of which 97.9% were carried out on women who had legal residence in Switzerland. 95% occurred during the first 12 weeks of pregnancy. The chosen methods were pharmacological (often mifepristone and misoprostol, 79%), the rest being surgical.

Abortion rates per 1000 women residing in Switzerland
Category	2019	2020
age 15-44	6.5	6.8
age 15-49	5.5	5.7
age 15-19	3.5	3.5

Of the 11,049 abortions carried out in 2021, 56 were performed after the 23rd week. In most cases, it involved severely malformed fetuses.

== See also ==
- Abortion by country
