= Loire-Atlantique's 8th constituency =

Constituency of the National Assembly of France

8th constituency of Loire-Atlantique
- inline Constituency of the National Assembly of France

- Constituency in Department

- Location of Loire-Atlantique in France
- Deputy: Matthias Tavel; LFI
- Department: Loire-Atlantique
- Cantons: Montoir-de-Bretagne, Saint-Nazaire Centre, Saint-Nazaire Est, Saint-Nazaire Ouest, Savenay

The 8th constituency of Loire-Atlantique is a French legislative constituency in the Loire-Atlantique département. Like the other 576 French constituencies, it elects one MP using the two-round system, with a run-off if no candidate receives over 50% of the vote in the first round.

== Geography ==
The constituency is based around Saint-Nazaire.

== Historic representation ==
Election	Member	Party
1988	Claude Évin	PS
1993	Étienne Garnier	RPR
1997	Claude Évin	PS
2002	Claude Évin	PS
2007	Marie-Odile Bouillé	PS
2012	Marie-Odile Bouillé	PS
2017	Audrey Dufeu-Schubert	LREM
2022	Matthias Tavel	LFI
2024	Matthias Tavel	LFI

== Election results ==
=== 2024 ===
Candidate	Party	Alliance	First round			Second round		
Candidate	Party	Alliance	Votes	%	+/–	Votes	%	+/–
Matthias Tavel	LFI	NFP	18,317	30.99	-1.05	32,922	61.68	
Gauthier Bouchet	RN		17,065	28.87	+13.50	20,454	38.32	new
Audrey Dufeu	REN	Ensemble	11,991	20.28	-6.77	withdrew		
Xavier Perrin	PS	diss.	8,327	14.09	+1.75			
Florence Beuvelet	LR	UDC	2,525	4.27	-0.26			
Eddy Le Beller	LO		890	1.51	-0.04			
Votes			59,115	100.00		53,376	100.00	
Valid votes			59,115	97.79	-0.55	53,376	88.94	-4.87
Blank votes			945	1.56	+0.37	5,002	8.33	+4.05
Null votes			392	0.65	+0.18	1,634	2.72	+0.81
Turnout			60,452	66.32	+19.01	60,012	65.83	+18.94
Abstentions			30,695	33.68	-19.01	31,157	34.17	-18.94
Registered voters			91,147			91,169		
Result			LFI HOLD					

=== 2022 ===
Legislative Election 2022: Loire-Atlantique's 8th constituency
Party	Candidate	Votes	%	±%
LFI (NUPÉS)	Matthias Tavel	13,432	32.04	-4.50
LREM (Ensemble)	Audrey Dufeu	11,341	27.05	-11.39
RN	Gauthier Bouchet	6,443	15.37	+6.36
PS	Xavier Perrin*	5,174	12.34	N/A
LR (UDC)	Andréa Porcher	1,901	4.53	−3.48
REC	Frédérica Duvillier	1,059	2.53	N/A
Others	N/A	2,578	6.15	
Turnout		41,928	47.31	−2.98
2nd round result
LFI (NUPÉS)	Matthias Tavel	21,596	54.45	+11.15
LREM (Ensemble)	Audrey Dufeu	18,063	45.55	−11.15
Turnout		39,659	46.89	+4.05
LFI gain from LREM				

* PS dissident

=== 2017 ===
Candidate	Label	First round		Second round	
Candidate	Label	Votes	%	Votes	%
Audrey Dufeu-Schubert	REM	16,285	38.44	19,344	56.70
Lionel Debraye	FI	6,768	15.98	14,773	43.30
Laurianne Deniaud	PS	5,978	14.11		
Gauthier Bouchet	FN	3,816	9.01		
Florence Beuvelet	LR	3,394	8.01		
Fabrice Bazin	ECO	1,692	3.99		
Yvon Renévot	PCF	1,042	2.46		
Armelle Guénolé	DLF	581	1.37		
Hervé Carro	REG	520	1.23		
Stéphanie Chagnon	DIV	500	1.18		
Dennis Octor	PRG	486	1.15		
Eddy Le Beller	EXG	436	1.03		
Pierre-Christophe Rousseau	DIV	309	0.73		
Philippe Moreau	REG	305	0.72		
Tony Moulis	DIV	252	0.59		
Catherine Tarrius	DVD	0	0.00		
Votes		42,364	100.00	34,117	100.00
Valid votes		42,364	98.40	34,117	93.04
Blank votes		501	1.16	1,743	4.75
Null votes		186	0.43	809	2.21
Turnout		43,051	50.29	36,669	42.84
Abstentions		42,550	49.71	48,934	57.16
Registered voters		85,601		85,603	
Source: Ministry of the Interior

=== 2012 ===
Legislative Election 2012: Loire-Atlantique's 8th constituency
Party	Candidate	Votes	%	±%
PS	Marie-Odile Bouille	23,475	51.70	
UMP	Maryvonne Le Liboux	7,671	16.89	
FN	Jean-Claude Blanchard	4,593	10.12	
FG	Yvon Renevot	3,695	8.14	
EELV	Pascale Hameau	2,762	6.08	
MoDem	Xavier Bruckert	1,088	2.40	
Others	N/A	2,121		
Turnout		45,405	55.98	
PS hold				

=== 2007 ===
Legislative Election 2007: Loire-Atlantique's 8th constituency
Party	Candidate	Votes	%	±%
PS	Marie-Odile Bouille	17,896	39.07	
UMP	Jean-François Arthur	13,160	28.73	
MoDem	Kevin Izorce	3,760	8.21	
LV	Arlette Mousseau	2,483	5.42	
PCF	Christian Saulnier	2,140	4.67	
Far left	Philippe Creneguy	1,545	3.37	
FN	Bernard Morin	1,156	2.52	
Others	N/A	3,665		
Turnout		46,550	58.84	
2nd round result
PS	Marie-Odile Bouille	28,471	64.30	
UMP	Jean-François Arthur	15,806	35.70	
Turnout		45,496	57.51	
PS hold				

=== 2002 ===
Legislative Election 2002: Loire-Atlantique's 8th constituency
Party	Candidate	Votes	%	±%
PS	Claude Evin	18,391	41.49	
UMP	Joel Gicquiaud	8,964	20.22	
UDF	Danielle Richard	3,653	8.24	
FN	Bernard Morin	2,920	6.59	
PCF	Jean Rene Teillant	2,648	5.97	
LV	Bernard Garnier	2,308	5.21	
CPNT	Thierry Moyon	1,188	2.68	
LCR	Christophe Gilbert	1,058	2.39	
Others	N/A	3,199		
Turnout		45,223	62.59	
2nd round result
PS	Claude Evin	25,090	63.67	
UMP	Joel Gicquiaud	14,317	36.33	
Turnout		41,263	57.11	
PS hold				

=== 1997 ===
Legislative Election 1997: Loire-Atlantique's 8th constituency
Party	Candidate	Votes	%	±%
PS	Claude Evin	13,699	30.55	
MRC	Joël Batteux*	10,146	22.63	
RPR	Etienne Garnier	9,145	20.39	
FN	Eric de la Brosse	4,020	8.97	
LO	Marie-France Belin	2,002	4.46	
Far left	Bernard Garnier	1,293	2.88	
GE	Marie-Martine Lips	1,229	2.74	
MEI	Jean-Roland Lassalle	904	2.02	
DVD	Gilles Régnier	896	2.00	
Others	N/A	1,506		
Turnout		47,110	63.63	
2nd round result
PS	Claude Evin	21,077	100.00	
Turnout		30,359	41.01	
PS gain from RPR				

* Withdrew before the 2nd round

== Sources ==
- Official results of French elections from 1998: "Résultats électoraux officiels en France" (in French). Archived from the original on 20 December 2011.
