= Ernest Loumaye =

Belgian entrepreneur (born 1952)

- Born: 1952 (age 73–74); Belgium
- Occupations: Businessperson, entrepreneur
- Known for: Co-founder and CEO of ObsEva

Ernest Loumaye is a Belgian entrepreneur known for his works in the women's health care industry. He is the co-founder and CEO of ObsEva, a clinical-stage biopharmaceutical company focused on the clinical development and commercialization of novel therapeutics for severe medical conditions relating to women’s reproductive and pregnancy health.

== Early life and education ==
Loumaye was born in Belgium in 1952 and obtained an M.D. and Ph.D. from Louvain University, with a specialization in Obstetrics and Gynecology.

== Career ==
Loumaye began his career as the gynecologist in charge of the reproductive unit at Université catholique de Louvain (UCLouvain), university hospital in Brussels, Belgium.

In 2006, he co-founded Preglem SA, a Swiss specialty biopharmaceutical company, where he served as the CEO from 2006 to 2012. It worked to develop and commercialize women's reproductive medicine. PregLem’s leading drug helped women suffering from fibroids, a condition where noncancerous growths in the uterus develop during a woman’s childbearing years. In total, PregLem raised over 68 million Swiss francs (Fr.) (US$71 million) in funding and eventually sold in 2010 for Fr. 445 million ($465 million) to eastern European pharmaceutical company Richter Gedeon.

Loumaye is also the chairman of the board of directors of GenKyoTex S.A., a private Swiss pharmaceutical company.

After PregLem, Loumaye co-founded ObsEva in 2012. Like PregLem, ObsEva is a company focused on women’s reproductive health. It deals with health issues relating to women by producing drugs that address conditions from conception to birth. The company, ObsEva is headquartered in Geneva, Switzerland, and is a listed company on NASDAQ since January 2017.
