= Spouse =

Partner in a marriage or similar union

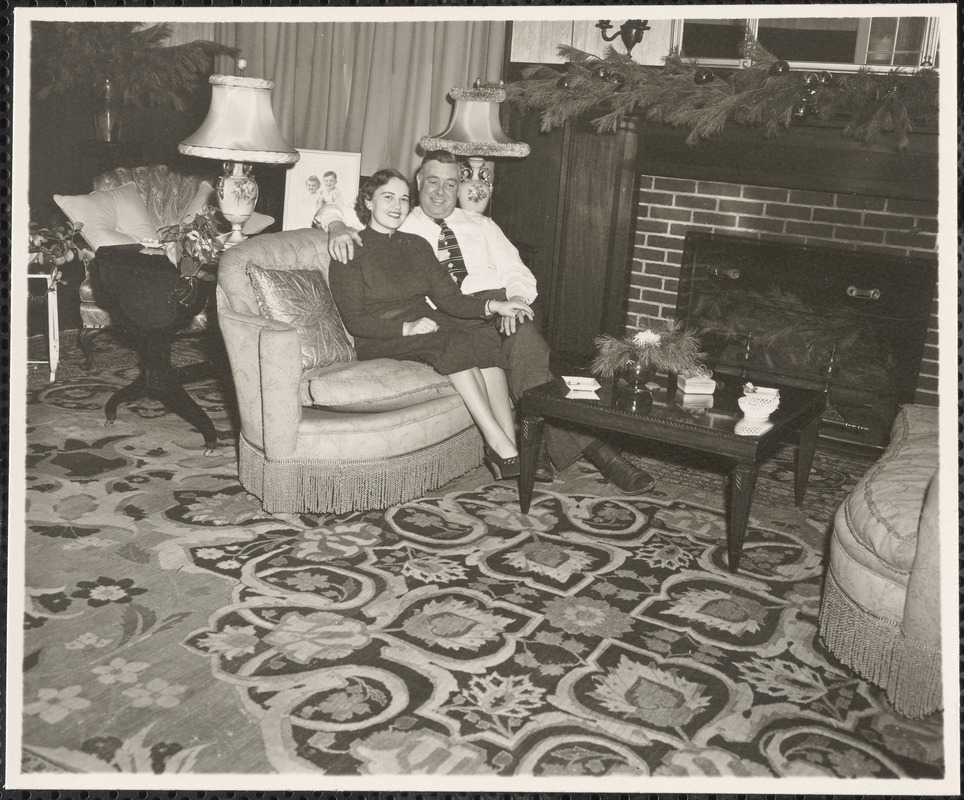
Husband and wife, 1951

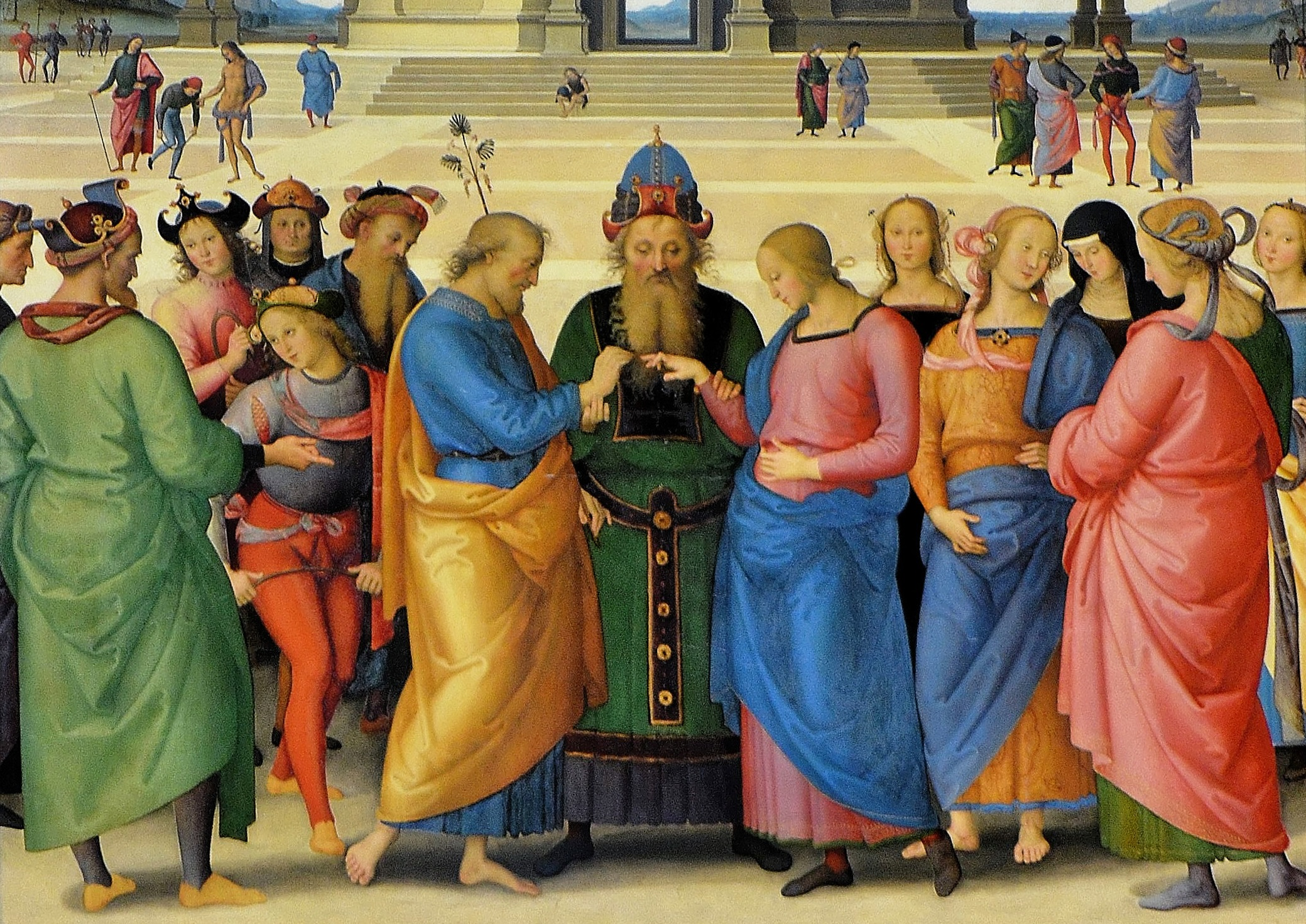
Marriage of the Virgin, a Renaissance period painting depicting a marriage

A spouse is a significant other in a marriage. A female spouse is called a wife while a male spouse is called a husband.

== Marriage ==
The legal status of a spouse, and the specific rights and obligations associated with that status, vary significantly among the jurisdictions of the world. These regulations are usually described in family law statutes. However, in many parts of the world, where civil marriage is not that prevalent, there is instead customary marriage, which is usually regulated informally by the community. In many parts of the world, spousal rights and obligations are related to the payment of bride price, dowry or dower. Historically, many societies have given sets of rights and obligations to male marital partners that have been very different from the sets of rights and obligations given to female marital partners. In particular, the control of marital property, inheritance rights, and the right to dictate the activities of children of the marriage have typically been given to male marital partners. However, this practice was curtailed to a great deal in many countries in the twentieth century, and more modern statutes tend to define the rights and duties of a spouse without reference to gender. Among the last European countries to establish full gender equality in marriage was Switzerland. In 1985, a referendum guaranteed women legal equality with men within marriage. The new reforms came into force in January 1988. Although married women in France obtained the right to work without their husbands' permission in 1965, and the paternal authority of a man over his family was ended in 1970 (before that, parental responsibilities belonged solely to the father, who made all legal decisions concerning the children), it was only in 1985 that a legal reform abolished the stipulation that the husband had the sole power to administer the children's property. in the 1980s. In various marriage laws around the world, however, the husband continues to have authority; for instance, the Civil Code of Iran states at Article 1105: "In relations between husband and wife; the position of the head of the family is the exclusive right of the husband".

Depending on jurisdiction, the refusal or inability of a spouse to perform the marital obligations may constitute a ground for divorce, legal separation or annulment. The latter two options are more prevalent in countries where the dominant religion is Roman Catholicism, some of which introduced divorce only recently (i.e., Italy in 1970, Portugal in 1975, Brazil in 1977, Spain in 1981, Argentina in 1987, Paraguay in 1991, Colombia in 1991, Ireland in 1996, Chile in 2004 and Malta in 2011). In recent years, many Western countries have adopted no-fault divorce. In some parts of the world, the formal dissolution of a marriage is complicated by the payments and goods which have been exchanged between families (this is common where marriages are arranged). This often makes it difficult to leave a marriage, especially for the woman: in some parts of Africa, once the bride price has been paid, the wife is seen as belonging to the husband and his family; if she wants to leave, the husband may demand back the bride price that he had paid to the girl's family. The girl's family often cannot or does not want to pay it back.

Regardless of legislation, personal relations between spouses may also be influenced by local culture and religion.

=== Minimum age ===
There is often a minimum legal marriageable age. The United Nations Population Fund stated the following:

"In 2010, 158 countries reported that 18 years was the minimum legal age for marriage for women without parental consent or approval by a pertinent authority. However, in 146 countries, state or customary law allows girls younger than 18 to marry with the consent of parents or other authorities; in 52 countries, girls under age 15 can marry with parental consent. In contrast, 18 is the legal age for marriage without consent among males in 180 countries. Additionally, in 105 countries, boys can marry with the consent of a parent or a pertinent authority, and in 23 countries, boys under age 15 can marry with parental consent."

== Children ==
In Western countries, spouses sometimes choose not to have children. In some parts of the world, there are greater expectations that heterosexual couples will procreate, as is the case in northern Ghana. For example, the payment of the bride signifies a woman's requirement to bear children, and women using birth control are at risk of threats and coercion.

== Selection of a spouse ==
There are many ways in which a spouse is chosen, which vary across the world and include love marriage, arranged marriage, and forced marriage. The latter is, in some jurisdictions, a void marriage or a voidable marriage. Forcing someone to marry is also a criminal offense in some countries.

== See also ==
- Bride
- Spousal privilege
- Work spouses, a pair of co-workers sharing emotional bonds similar to those in a marriage
