= Exelgyn =

Pharmaceutical manufacturer

- Industry: Pharmaceutical
- Headquarters: Paris, France
- Area served: Worldwide
- Products: mifepristone, misoprostol.
- Website: https://exelgyn.com/

Exelgyn is a French pharmaceutical company which makes and distributes the medical abortion drugs mifepristone (marketed as Mifegyne) and misoprostol.

== History ==
Mifepristone was discovered in France in 1980 by scientists at Roussel-Uclaf, in a pharmaceutical program aimed at the identifying agents acting as antagonists of glucocorticoids; with the observation that it also displayed anti-progestational properties, it was developed as an abortifacient, and was approved for sale in the French market in 1987.

In December 1996, pharma business news reported Hoechst AG's intent to buy the remaining share of Roussel-Uclaf stock that it did not yet own (43.5%).

Exelgyn is a firm founded in 1997, and as of May 2026, it was defined by a private partnership structure known in France as an Société par actions simplifiée (SAS). It was designed as a single-product company immune to antiabortion boycotts. Its CEO was former Roussel-Uclaf CEO Édouard Sakiz.

Hoechst announced cessation of its manufacture of the mifepristone in April 1997, and transferred all rights for its manufacture and sales outside of the United States to Exelgyn.

In 1999, Exelgyn won approval to market Mifegyne in 11 additional countries. As of 2024, Exelgyn was reporting that it was distributing mifepristone to 40 countries, although its manufacture and distribution in the U.S. market was by Danco Laboratories and GenBioPro.
