= Ecséd =

- Coat of arms

- Location of Ecséd in Hungary
- Coordinates: 47.731°N 19.769°E
- Country: Hungary
- Region: Northern Hungary
- County: Heves

Government
  - Mayor: Maksa "Pila" Mátyás

Population (Jan. 1, 2014)
  - Total: 3,171
- Time zone: UTC+1 (CET)
  - Summer (DST): UTC+2 (CEST)
- Postal code: 3013
- Area code: +36
- KSH code: 17181
- Website: www.ecsed.hu

Ecséd is a small village in Heves County, in Northern Hungary region of Hungary.

== Notable people ==
- Gyula Pikler (1864–1937), philosopher of law
- Gedeon Richter (1872–1944), business magnate, investor, philanthropist, founder of the Gedeon Richter plc
