= Metapristone =

Chemical compound

Clinical data
- Other names: RU-42633; Desmethylmifepristone; 17β-Hydroxy-11β-[4-(methylamino)phenyl]-17α-(prop-1-yn-1-yl)estra-4,9-dien-3-one

Identifiers
- IUPAC name: (8S,11R,13S,14S,17S)-17-hydroxy-13-methyl-11-[4-(methylamino)phenyl]-17-prop-1-ynyl-1,2,6,7,8,11,12,14,15,16-decahydrocyclopenta[a]phenanthren-3-one
- CAS Number: 104004-96-8
- PubChem CID: 10070462
- ChemSpider: 8246002
- UNII: K1P8OGJ86J
- ChEMBL: ChEMBL1608
- CompTox Dashboard (EPA): DTXSID60146216

Chemical and physical data
- Formula: C_{28}H_{33}NO_{2}
- Molar mass: 415.577 g·mol^{−1}
- 3D model (JSmol): Interactive image
- SMILES: CC#C[C@@]1(CC[C@@H]2[C@@]1(C[C@@H](C3=C4CCC(=O)C=C4CC[C@@H]23)C5=CC=C(C=C5)NC)C)O
- InChI: InChI=1S/C28H33NO2/c1-4-14-28(31)15-13-25-23-11-7-19-16-21(30)10-12-22(19)26(23)24(17-27(25,28)2)18-5-8-20(29-3)9-6-18/h5-6,8-9,16,23-25,29,31H,7,10-13,15,17H2,1-3H3/t23-,24+,25-,27-,28-/m0/s1; Key:IBLXOBHABOVXDY-WKWWZUSTSA-N

Metapristone (developmental code name RU-42633; also known as desmethylmifepristone) is the major metabolite of mifepristone (RU-486, RU-38486) and a selective progesterone receptor modulator (SPRM) which itself was never marketed. It is formed from mifepristone in the liver by the enzyme CYP3A4 via monodemethylation, and circulates at concentrations higher than those of mifepristone. The metabolite retains partial but considerable affinity for the progesterone receptor (PR) and the glucocorticoid receptor (GR) (RBA = 21% and 61% of that of mifepristone for the human forms of these receptors, respectively). On the basis of actions that are apparently independent of its hormonal activity, metapristone is being researched as a potential cancer metastatic chemopreventive agent.
