= Roussel Uclaf =

French pharmaceutical company

Roussel-Uclaf S.A.
- Logo, designed by Raymond Loewy in 1963

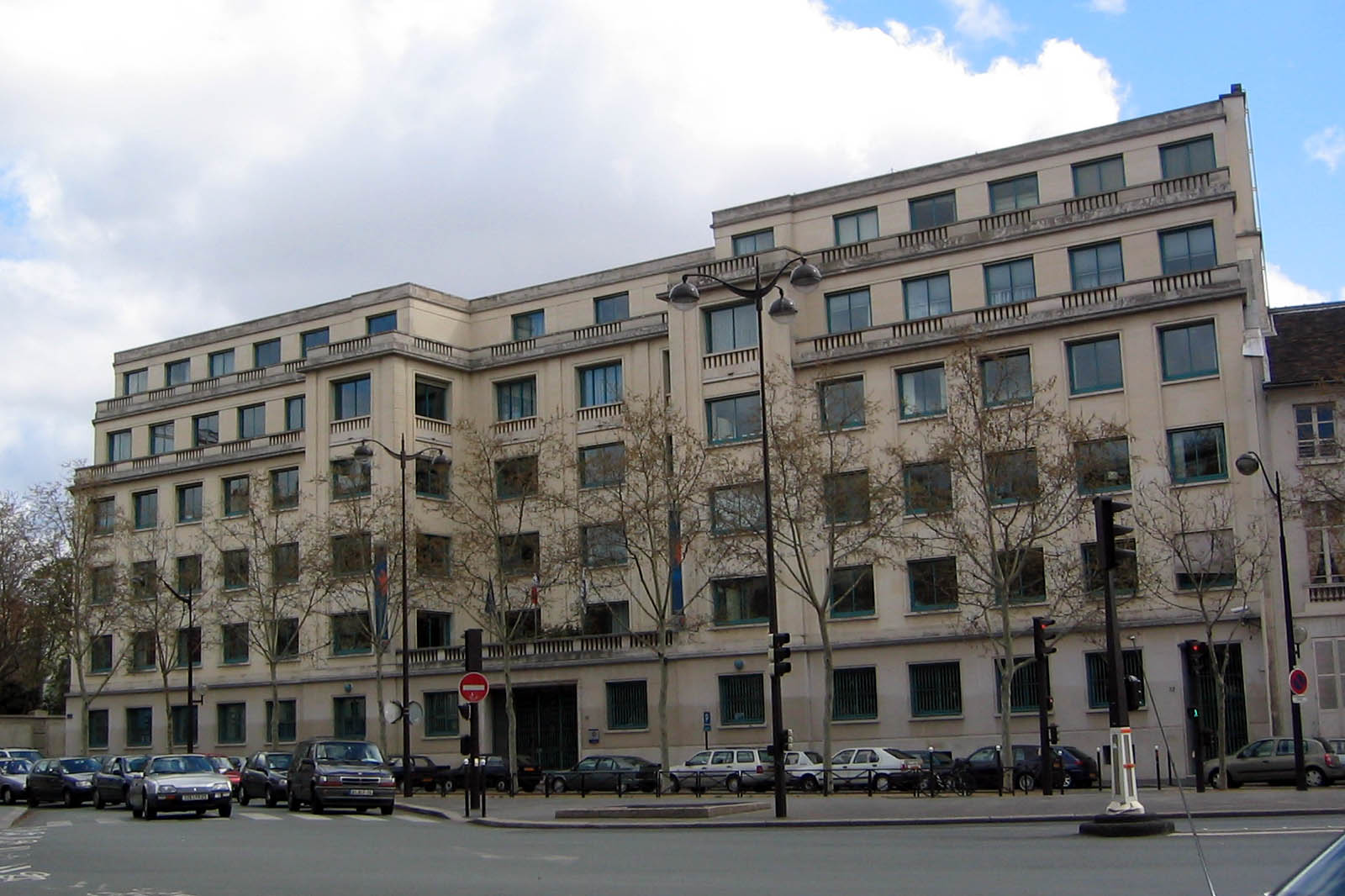
- Former headquarters of Roussel-Uclaf, 35 Boulevard des Invalides, 7th arrondissement of Paris
- Type: Public (Société anonyme)
- Industry: Pharmaceutical
- Founded: Paris, France (1911); Institut de Sérothérapie Hémopoïétique; ISH (1920); Usines Chimiques des Laboratoires Français; UCLAF (1928); Société Française de la Pénicilline; SOFRAPEN (1947) (Roussel-Uclaf, S.A. incorporated 1961)
- Founder: Gaston Roussel
- Defunct: September 30, 1997
- Fate: Acquired
- Successor: Hoechst AG (Hoechst Marion Roussel)
- Headquarters: Paris, France (1911–1995); Romainville, France (1995–1997)
- Area served: Worldwide
- Key people: Gaston Roussel (CEO, 1911–1947); Jean-Claude Roussel (CEO, 1961–1972); Jacques Machizaud (CEO, 1974–1981); Édouard Sakiz (CEO, 1981–1993); Ernst-Günter Afting (CEO, 1994–1995); Jean-Pierre Godard (CEO, 1995–1997)
- Products: Hemostyl (erythropoietin, horse serum); Rubiazol (carboxysulfamidochrysoidine); Rythmodan (disopyramide); Decis (deltamethrin); Surgam (tiaprofenic acid); Claforan (cefotaxime sodium); Mifegyne (mifepristone, RU-486); Anandron (nilutamide)
- Revenue: ▲US$ 3.01 billion (1996)
- Net income: ▲US$ 340 million(1996)
- Number of employees: 15,673 worldwide (1992); 8,409 in France (1992); 6,533 in France (1996)

Roussel Uclaf S.A. was a French pharmaceutical company and one of several predecessor companies of today's Sanofi.

It was the second largest French pharmaceutical company before it was acquired by Hoechst AG of Frankfurt, Germany in 1997, with pharmaceutical operations combined into the Hoechst Marion Roussel (HMR) division in the United States. Roussel Uclaf's agrochemical operations had been transferred to Hoechst Schering AgrEvo GmbH in 1994.

HMR subsequently merged in 1999 with Rhône-Poulenc to form Aventis, which then merged in 2004 with Sanofi-Synthélabo to form Sanofi-Aventis, which was since renamed Sanofi. Hoechst Schering AgrEvo merged in 1999 with Rhône-Poulenc's agrochemical division to form Aventis CropScience, which was acquired by Bayer AG in 2002 and combined with Bayer's agrochemical division to form Bayer CropScience.

== RU-486 ==
In April 1980, as part of a formal research project at Roussel-Uclaf for the development of glucocorticoid receptor antagonists, chemist Georges Teutsch synthesized mifepristone (RU-38486, the 38,486th compound synthesized by Roussel-Uclaf from 1949 to 1980; shortened to RU-486); which was discovered to also be a progesterone receptor antagonist. In October 1981, endocrinologist Étienne-Émile Baulieu, a consultant to Roussel-Uclaf, arranged tests of its use for medical abortion in eleven women in Switzerland by gynecologist Walter Herrmann at the University of Geneva's Cantonal Hospital, with successful results announced on April 19, 1982. On October 9, 1987, following worldwide clinical trials in 20,000 women of mifepristone with a prostaglandin analogue (initially sulprostone or gemeprost, later misoprostol) for medical abortion, Roussel-Uclaf sought approval in France for their use for medical abortion, with approval announced on September 23, 1988.

== Abortion products ==
On October 21, 1988, in response to antiabortion protests and concerns of majority (54.5%) owner Hoechst AG of Germany, Roussel-Uclaf's executives and board of directors voted 16 to 4 to stop distribution of mifepristone, which they announced on October 26, 1988. Two days later, the French government ordered Roussel-Uclaf to distribute mifepristone in the interests of public health. French Health Minister Claude Évin explained that: "I could not permit the abortion debate to deprive women of a product that represents medical progress. From the moment Government approval for the drug was granted, RU-486 became the moral property of women, not just the property of a drug company." Following use by 34,000 women in France from April 1988 to February 1990 of mifepristone distributed free of charge, Roussel-Uclaf began selling Mifegyne (mifepristone) to hospitals in France in February 1990 at a price (negotiated with the French government) of $48 per 600 mg dose.

Mifegyne was subsequently approved in Great Britain on July 1, 1991, and in Sweden in September 1992, but until his retirement in late April 1994, Hoechst AG chairman Wolfgang Hilger, a devout Roman Catholic, blocked any further expansion in availability. On May 16, 1994, Roussel-Uclaf announced that it was donating without remuneration all rights for medical uses of mifepristone in the U.S. to the Population Council, which subsequently licensed mifepristone to Danco Laboratories, a new single-product company immune to antiabortion boycotts, which won FDA approval as Mifeprex on September 28, 2000.

On April 8, 1997, after buying the remaining 43.5% of Roussel-Uclaf stock in early 1997, Hoechst AG ($30 billion annual revenue) announced the end of its manufacture and sale of Mifegyne ($3.44 million annual revenue) and the transfer of all rights for medical uses of mifepristone outside of the U.S. to Exelgyn S.A., a new single-product company immune to antiabortion boycotts, whose CEO was former Roussel-Uclaf CEO Édouard Sakiz. In 1999, Exelgyn won approval of Mifegyne in 11 additional countries, and in 28 more countries over the following decade.

== Sources ==
- "Roussel takes off". Chemical Week. April 10, 1965. pp. 60, 62.
- Cornwell, Rupert (1974). "France: the mask of modernity". In Rowley, Anthony (ed.). The barons of European industry. London: Croom Helm. pp. 5–22. ISBN 0-85664-105-7.
- Derdak, Thomas, ed. (1988). "Roussel Uclaf". International directory of company histories, Volume 1. Chicago: St. James Press. pp. 669–670. ISBN 0-912289-10-4.
- Taggart, James (1993). "The European pharmaceutical industry". The world pharmaceutical industry. London: Routledge. pp. 316–370. ISBN 0-415-02500-1.
- Dougal, April S. (1994). "Roussel Uclaf". In Kepos, Paula (ed.). International directory of company histories, Volume 8. Detroit: St. James Press. pp. 451–453. ISBN 1-55862-323-X.
- "Hoechst Marion Roussel". The pharmaceutical industry: a history & calendar. West Lafayette: Bioanalytical Systems, Inc. 1999.
- Furio, Antoine (2006). "Gaston Roussel to Sanofi-Aventis: nearly a century of Romainville pharmaceutical history and heritage" (PDF). Heritage in Seine-Saint-Denis, No. 15. Bobigny: General Council of Seine-Saint-Denis.
- "History of Roussel laboratories". Paris: Society for the History of Pharmacy. 2005.
- "Some dates". Romainville: Biocitech. 2008. Archived from the original on 2010-03-29.
- Kugener, André (2008). "Opotherapie". Museum of Medical History. Luxembourg: Kugener.com.
- Rossignol, Sylvain (2008). Notre usine est un roman. Paris: La Découverte. ISBN 978-2-7071-5462-0.
- "Photo gallery - Our factory is a novel". Paris: notreusineestunroman.com. 2008.
