= Gedeon Richter =

Hungarian pharmacist (1872–1944)

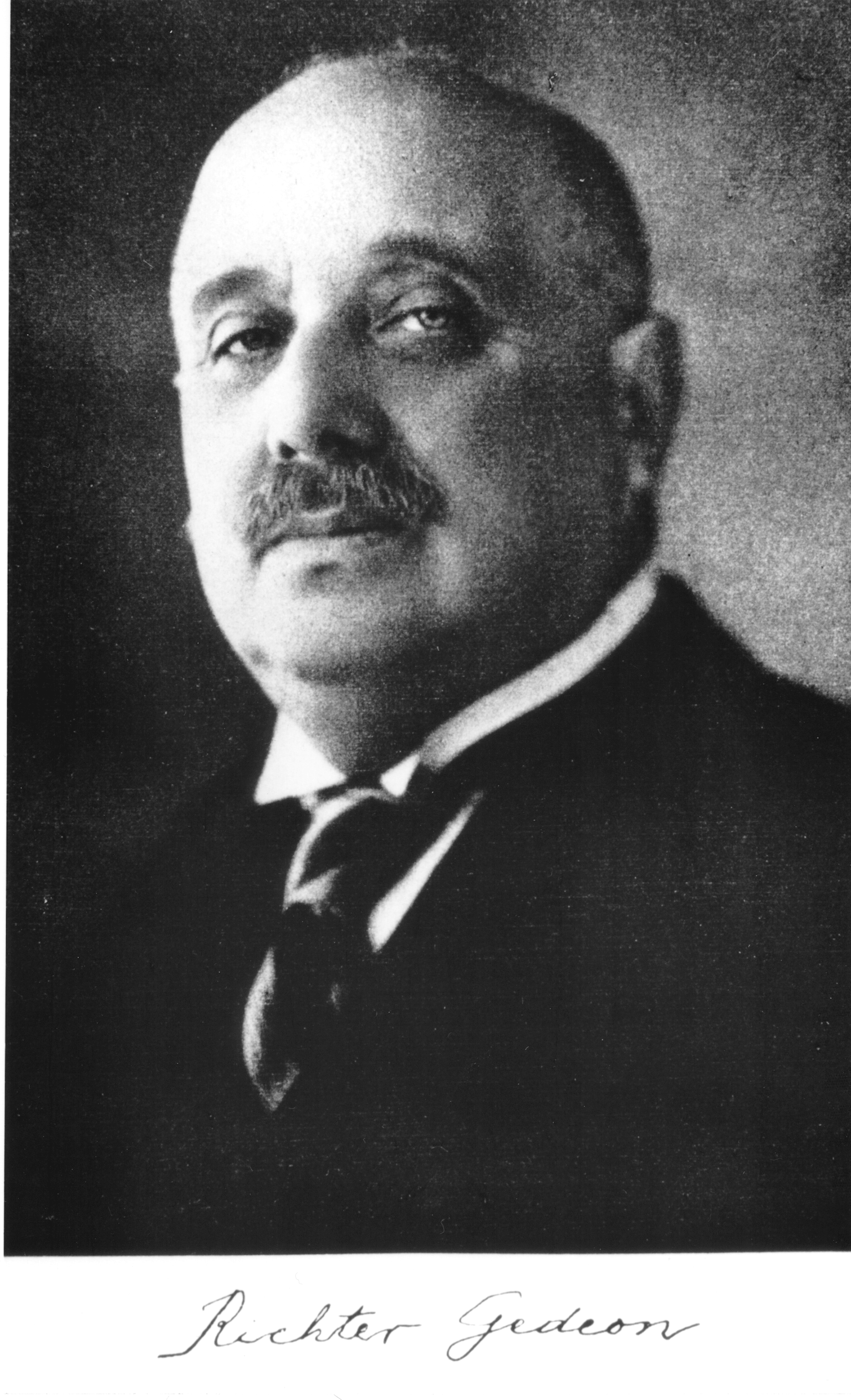
- Born: 23 September 1872; Ecséd, Hungary
- Died: 30 December 1944 (aged 72); Budapest, Hungary
- Occupations: pharmacist, businessman
- Spouse: Nina Winkler
- Children: László
- Parent(s): Adolf Richter; Róza Engel

Gedeon Richter (23 September 1872 – 30 December 1944) was a Hungarian pharmacist, founder of Gedeon Richter plc and a pioneer of the modern Hungarian pharmaceutical industry.

== Life ==
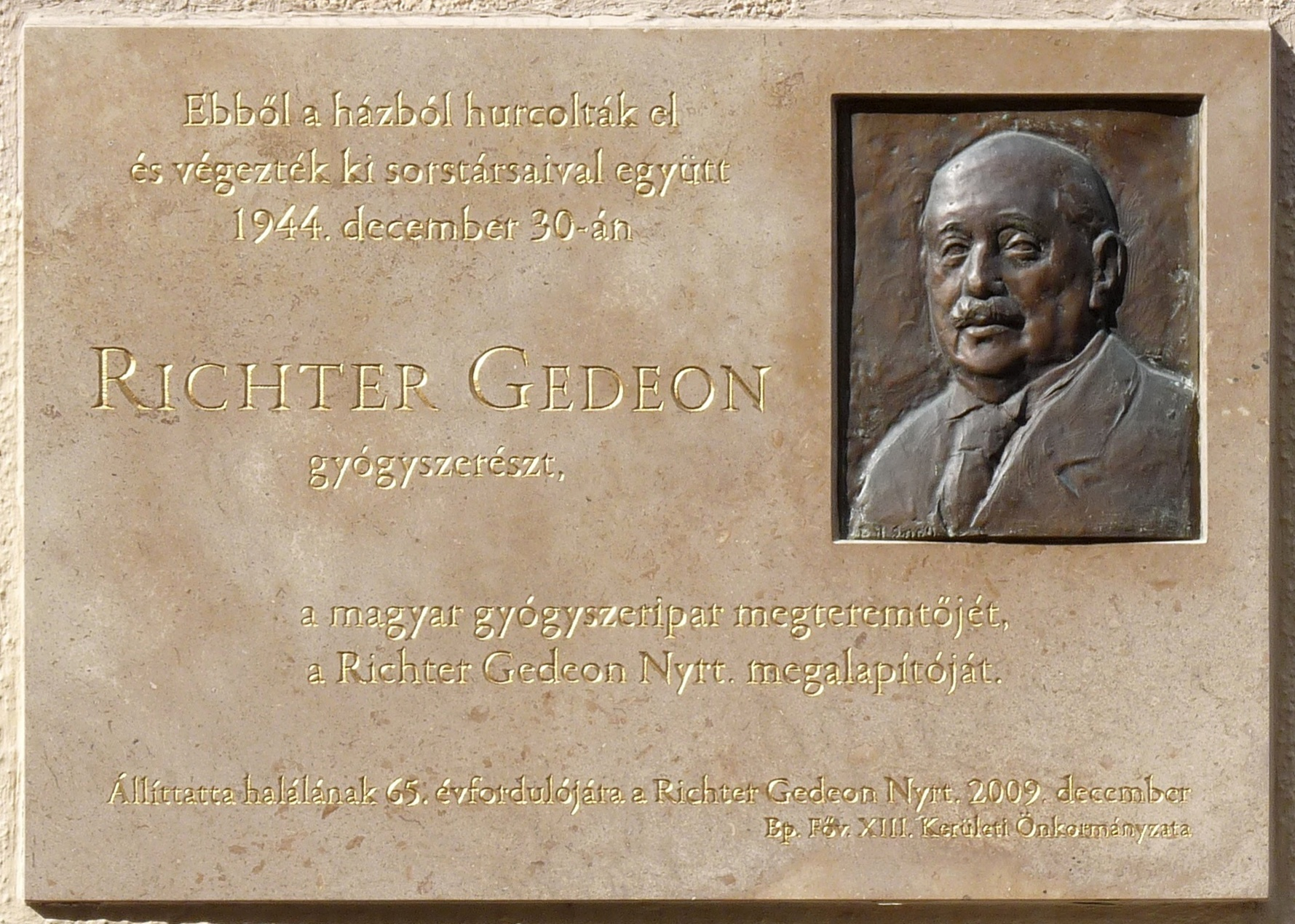
His memorial plaque on his home

Richter was born to a Jewish family in Ecséd, Hungary, but due to the death of his parents, from 1873 he grew up in Gyöngyös. From 1890 he worked there as a trainee pharmacist. In 1895 Richter completed his degree in pharmacy with a high mark at the Budapest University. Two years later, he travelled to several European pharmacies and pharmaceutical companies, studying their drug manufacturing methods. In 1901 he bought a pharmacy named as Arany Sas (the Golden Eagle) in Budapest, producing organo-therapeutic drugs. In 1907, in Kőbánya he built, and took charge of, the first pharmaceutical factory in Hungary. The factory had its first major success with a brand of Aspirin called Kalmopyrin, and a disinfectant Hydrogen peroxide–urea in tablets branded Hyperol, which were patented in 1912 and went on to play an important role in the World War I. Before the war, he already had 24 pharmaceutical patents.

== World War 2 ==
By the start of World War II, his pharmaceutical network had representatives on five continents, with 10 subsidiaries and in 34 states with commission repositories.

In 1942, he was stripped from his position as director (due to anti-Semitic laws), and banned from his factory. Then he managed the company from his home with the staff he trusted. In the autumn of 1944 the factory activity was almost completely paralyzed. Even though he had the opportunity to leave Budapest and move to Switzerland, he did not want to leave the company. His wife and himself were hidden by Raoul Wallenberg with more than a thousand other Jews. After being caught, Richter was murdered by the Hungarian "nyilas" national socialists (Arrow Cross Party) in December 1944, along with others shot, and thrown into the Danube.

== Impact ==
After the war, the factory was rebuilt under the name of Richter Pharmaceutical Factory in Kőbánya. In 1972, on the 100th anniversary of Richter's birth, a commemorative medal was struck, and a memorial plaque was added to the Eagle pharmacy.

Richter made the first organo-therapeutic composition for raising blood pressure, an adrenal hormone extract (adrenaline), and the Kalmopyrin and the Tonogen suprarenale which are all still used in medicine.

His family house now operates as a school, under the name Richter Gedeon Elementary School in Ecséd. The room in which he was born functions as a gym today.

== Personal life ==
In 1902 he married Anna Winkler, the daughter of a timber manufacturer of Szeged, Hungary. The couple's only son, László was born in 1903. He studied chemistry at the ETH Zurich and followed his father's footsteps in the pharmaceutical industry.

The parents were practicing Jews, but László converted to the Christian faith of his bride, Ilona Lobmayer, before their marriage in 1932.

== Sources ==
- Pillich, Lajos: Richter Gedeon. In: Magyar tudóslexikon A-tól Zs-ig. Editor in chief: Nagy Ferenc. Budapest: Better; MTESZ; OMIKK. 1997, pp. 679–680 ISBN 963-85433-5-3
- Reményi Gyenes, István: Ismerjük őket? Zsidó származású nevezetes magyarok, Ex Libris Kiadó, Budapest, 2000 ISBN 963-85530-3-0
