= Danco Laboratories =

American pharmaceutical distributor

- Industry: Pharmaceutical
- Headquarters: New York, United States
- Area served: United States
- Products: mifepristone
- Website: EarlyOptionPill.com

Danco Laboratories is a pharmaceutical distributor located in midtown Manhattan which distributes the abortifacient drug mifepristone under the brand name Mifeprex. Mifeprex is the only drug distributed by Danco, although the company plans to expand to other drugs in the future.

Danco is a private company that does not disclose the names of its investors, but stated that "[Investors] included wealthy individuals and foundations that supported abortion rights."

Outside the United States, mifepristone is distributed by the French pharmaceutical company Exelgyn, under the trade name Mifegyne.

== History ==
On 16 May 1994, Roussel-Uclaf announced it was donating without remuneration all rights for medical uses of mifepristone in the United States to the Population Council, which would then sponsor clinical trials for mifepristone between September 1994 and September 1995. In September 1995, The Population Council licensed mifepristone to Danco Laboratories and entered into a manufacturing agreement with Hungarian drug manufacturer Gedeon Richter. In 1996, the US Food and Drug Administration (FDA) conditionally licensed RU-486 for early trimester abortion, pending a resolution on some remaining technical and manufacturing issues.

In 1997, Gideon Richter withdrew from efforts to manufacture mifepristone in the United States following opposition from pro-life groups, which led to Danco filing a breach of contract lawsuit.

On September 28, 2000, Danco Laboratories received approval to distribute mifepristone (under the Mifeprex brand name) from the US Food and Drug Administration (FDA).

Danco had exclusive sales rights in the United States until 2019, when GenBioPro obtained approval to sell a generic version of mifepristone.

== See also ==
- Birth control movement in the United States
- Medical abortion
