= GenBioPro =

Pharmaceutical manufacturer

- Industry: Pharmaceutical
- Headquarters: United States
- Area served: United States
- Products: mifepristone
- Website: https://genbiopro.com/

GenBioPro is a United States pharmaceutical company which makes and distributes a generic version of the medication abortion drug mifepristone.

== History ==
In 2019 GenBioPro obtained Food and Drug Administration (FDA) authorization to sell a generic version of mifepristone (before that, Danco Laboratories was the only company that distributed it in the United States). Lauren Gardner, writing for Politico, reports that despite FDA's aim to approve generic drug applications in 10 months, the GenBioPro application (in 2009) was only approved after 10 years.

In 2023, GenBioPro sued the FDA to obtain a legal judgement confirming that mifepristone could continue to be sold, in spite of anti-abortion laws passed in some states.

== See also ==
- Birth control movement in the United States
- Exelgyn
- Medical abortion
