= Audrey Dufeu-Schubert =

French politician

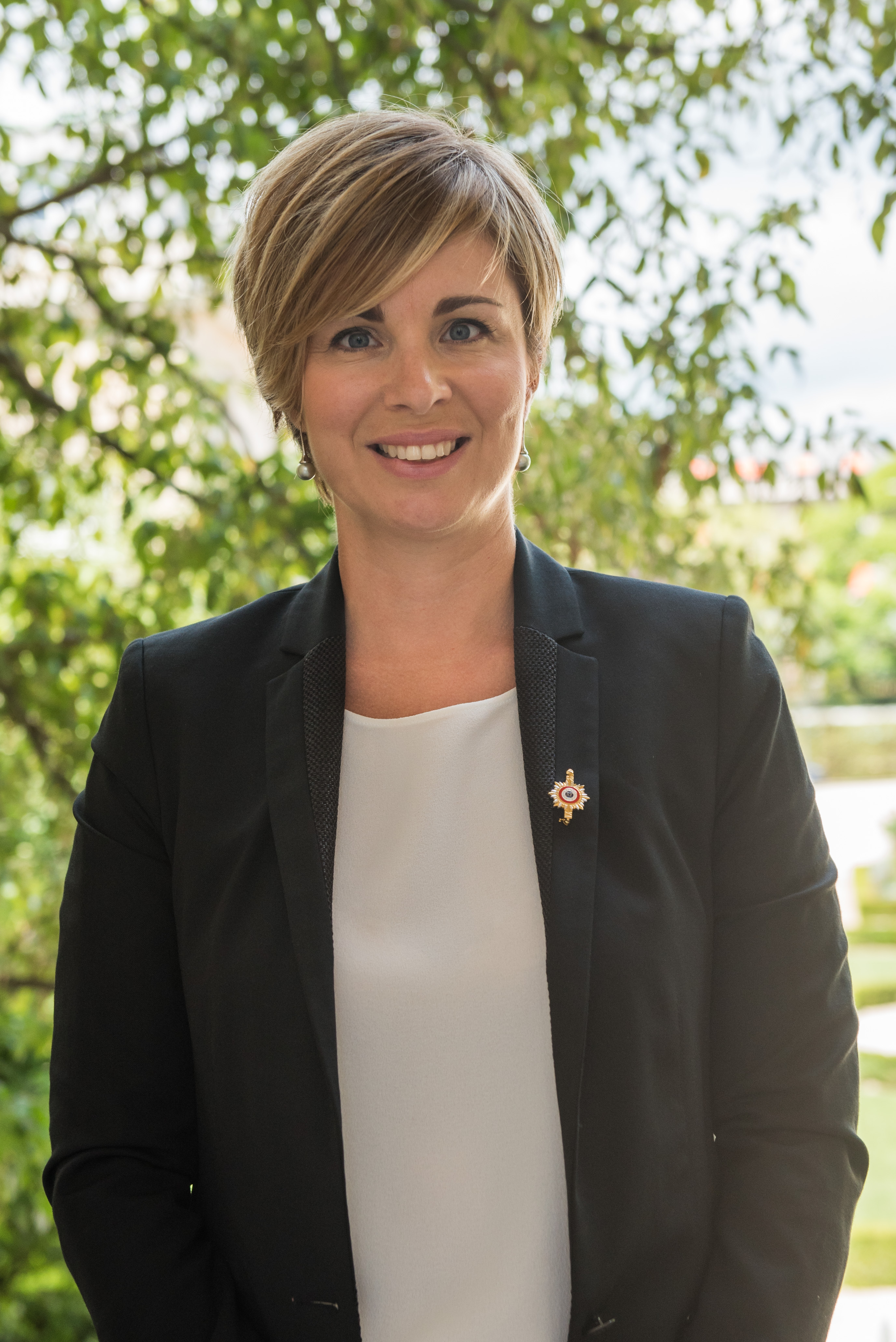

Member of the French National Assembly for Loire-Atlantique's 8th constituency
- Incumbent
- Assumed office 21 June 2017
- Preceded by: Marie-Odile Bouillé

Personal details
- Born: 3 June 1980 (age 44); Saint-Nazaire, France
- Political party: En Marche!
- Education: Jean Moulin University Lyon 3
- Profession: Director of healthcare

Audrey Dufeu-Schubert (born 3 June 1980) is a French politician of La République En Marche! (LREM) who has been serving as a member of the French National Assembly since 18 June 2017, representing the 8th constituency of the department of Loire-Atlantique.

== Political career ==
In parliament, Dufeu-Schubert serves as member of the Committee on Social Affairs. In addition to her committee assignments, she chairs the French-Danish Parliamentary Friendship Group.

== Political positions ==
In July 2019, Dufeu-Schubert voted in favor of the French ratification of the European Union’s Comprehensive Economic and Trade Agreement (CETA) with Canada.

== See also ==
- 2017 French legislative election
