= Marie-Odile Bouillé =

French politician (born 1950)

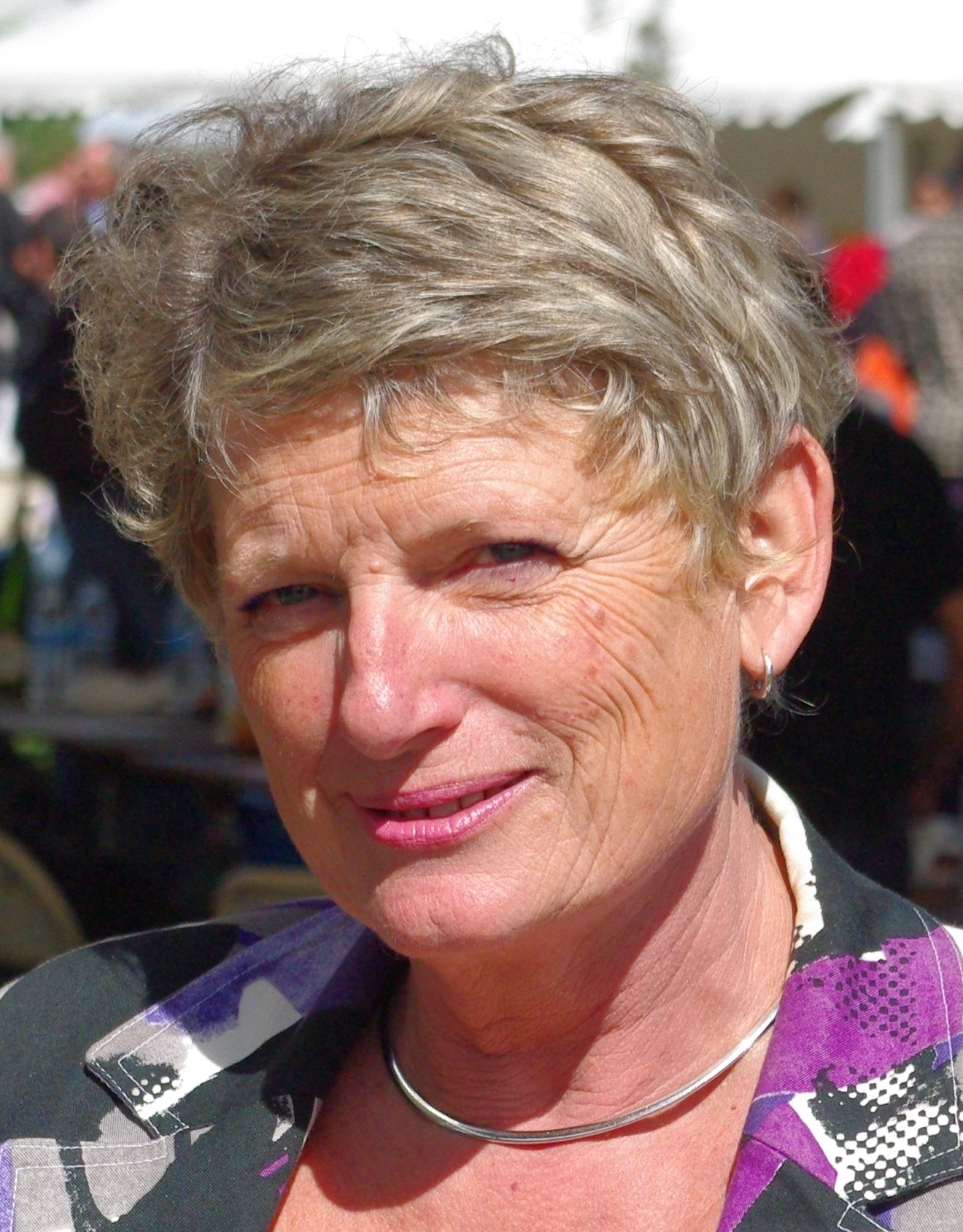

Member of the National Assembly for Loire-Atlantique's 8th constituency
- In office 20 June 2007 – 20 June 2017
- Preceded by: Claude Évin
- Succeeded by: Audrey Dufeu-Schubert

Personal details
- Born: 13 October 1950 (age 75) Nantes, France
- Party: Socialist Party
- Profession: Midwife

Marie-Odile Bouillé (born 13 October 1950 in Nantes) was a member of the National Assembly of France. She represented Loire-Atlantique's 8th constituency from 2007 to 2017 as a member of the Socialiste, radical, citoyen et divers gauche.

== Biography ==
A midwife by profession, she was elected as a deputy on 17 June 2007, for the 13th legislature (2007–2012), representing Loire-Atlantique's 8th constituency. A member of the Socialist, Radical, and Citizen group, she succeeded Claude Évin, who did not stand for re-election.

A municipal councillor and later deputy mayor of Saint-Nazaire since 1983, she was also a member of the Communauté d'agglomération de la région nazairienne et de l'estuaire (CARENE). From 2004 to 2008, she served as vice-president of the General Council of Loire-Atlantique, representing the Canton of Saint-Nazaire-Ouest.

Following her election to the National Assembly, she resigned from her position as deputy mayor of Saint-Nazaire and her mandate at CARENE. She also resigned from the General Council in early 2008 to run again in the municipal elections.

In the March 2008 municipal elections, she was elected (ranking 20th out of 49) on the list led by incumbent mayor Joël Batteux, and was subsequently elected vice-president of CARENE.

She was re-elected as the deputy for Loire-Atlantique's 8th constituency on 10 June 2012, obtaining 51.70% of the vote in the first round.

She did not stand for re-election in the June 2017 legislative elections. Laurianne Deniaud, the Socialist Party candidate nominated to succeed her, was eliminated in the first round of voting.
