= Abortion in Slovenia =

Abortion in Slovenia was legalized for the first time in January 1952 and in its current form in July 1977.

Abortion is available on-demand without further conditions for women whose pregnancies have not exceeded 10 weeks. After the 10th week, it must be approved by a medical committee of the first or second level. From the 22nd week, it is termed stillbirth. The final limit for abortion is 28 weeks. For most women, abortion is free.

Minors do not require parental consent before undergoing an abortion. Parents are usually notified unless the minor is already fully emancipated.

== Legal history ==
Abortion was originally legalised in the territory of current Slovenia with a decree (Uredba o postopku za dovoljeno odpravo plodu) in January 1952.

In April 1969, the Resolution on Family Planning (Resolucija o planiranju družine) defined the politics of voluntary family planning and included abortion as the least desired method of birth control.

In February 1974, the freedom of choice in the birth of children was defined in the federal constitution of Yugoslavia. This provision was the basis for the 1977 Health Measures in Exercising Freedom of Choice in Childbearing Act (Zakon o zdravstvenih ukrepih pri uresničevanju pravice do svobodnega odločanja o rojstvu otrok).

In December 1991, after Slovenia gained independence, a new constitution was adopted which kept the provision in Article 55. According to the Health Services Act (Zakon o zdravstveni dejavnosti) passed in 1992, doctors are allowed to exempt themselves from performing abortions if they disagree with the practice for ethical or religious reasons.

== Constitutional aspect ==
Article 55 of the Slovenian constitution reads:

"(Freedom of Choice in Childbearing)

Everyone shall be free to decide whether to bear children.

The state shall guarantee the opportunities for exercising this freedom and shall create such conditions as will enable parents to decide to bear children."

Whether this includes the right to abortion is an unresolved question that could only be definitely answered by the Constitutional Court of Slovenia.

== Statistics ==
The incidence of abortion in Slovenia has been declining. In 2009, 18% of pregnancies in Slovenia ended in abortion, down from a peak of 41.6% in 1982. As of 2009, the abortion rate was 11.5 abortions per 1000 women aged 15–44 years. In 2017, 3,529 abortions were performed, and in 2022, 2,996 abortions were performed.

== Methods ==
Abortion may be surgical or medical. The surgical method is preferred for women prior to the 10th week and those who have already given birth. Medical abortion may be performed in a hospital or under certain conditions at home. Mifepristone (medical abortion) was registered in 2013.
