= Claude Évin =

French politician and lawyer

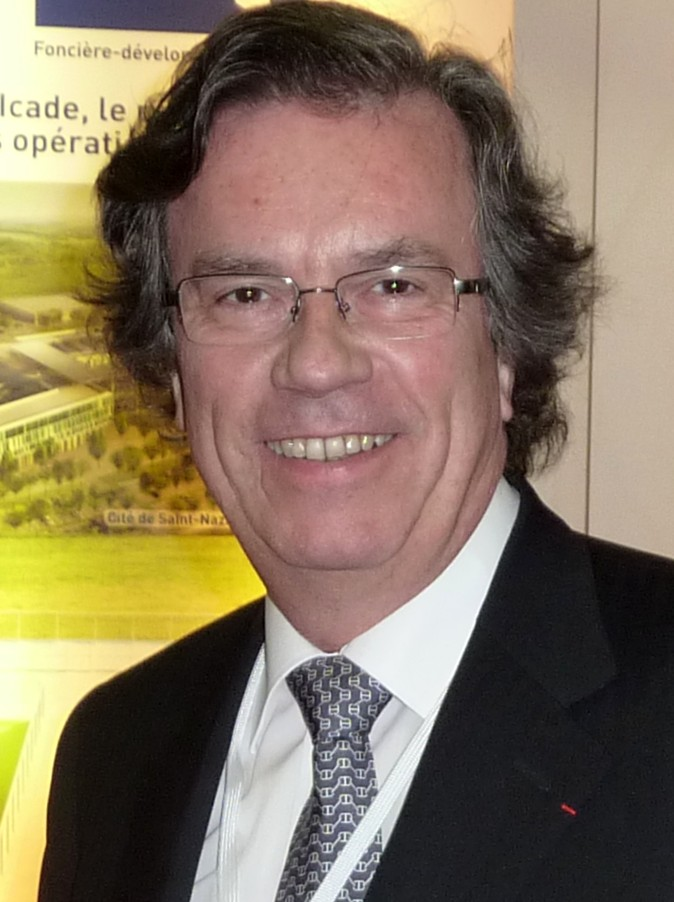
- Évin in 2009

Member of the National Assembly for Loire-Atlantique's 8th constituency
- In office 1 June 1997 – 17 June 2007
- Preceded by: Étienne Garnier
- Succeeded by: Marie-Odile Bouillé

Minister of Social Affairs and Solidarity
- In office 13 May 1988 – 15 May 1991
- President: François Mitterrand
- Prime Minister: Michel Rocard
- Preceded by: Michèle Barzach
- Succeeded by: Jean-Louis Bianco

Personal details
- Born: 29 June 1949 (age 77) Le Cellier, France
- Party: Socialist Party
- Profession: Lawyer

Claude Évin (born 29 June 1949) is a French politician and lawyer.

He was first elected in 1978. Prior to becoming a member of parliament, Claude Évin was the deputy mayor of Saint-Nazaire, a post he held until 1989. In his lengthy career, he held a variety of positions including Vice President of the National Assembly (1986–87); Minister for Health (1988–91) and Minister for Social Affairs (1988–91). As Minister for Health, he proposed the French alcohol and tobacco policy law, now known as Loi Évin, to the parliament (Law 91-32 of 10 January 1991).

Since being replaced as an MP for Loire-Atlantique by Marie-Odile Bouillé, he has moved to chairing the French Hospital Federation (FHF).

Évin is also notable for mandating the drug company Roussel Uclaf to resume the distribution of mifepristone, an abortifactant, two days after the company's board voted 16–4 to discontinue its distribution due to concerns of the image of the company's majority-owner. This was regarding a negative public image related to the popular anti-abortion sentiments of France in the late 1980s. He stated "I could not permit the abortion debate to deprive women of a product that represents medical progress. From the moment government approval for the drug was granted, RU-486 became the moral property of women, not just the property of a drug company."
