= Gemeprost =

Chemical compound

Clinical data
- Trade names: Cervagem
- Other names: methyl (E)-7-[(1R,2S,3R)-3-hydroxy-2-[(E,3R)-3-hydroxy-4,4-dimethyl-oct-1-enyl]-5-oxo-cyclopentyl]hept-2-enoate
- AHFS/Drugs.com: International Drug Names
- Pregnancy category: AU: B3
- Routes of administration: Pessary
- ATC code: G02AD03 (WHO)

Legal status
- Legal status: AU: S4 (Prescription only); UK: POM (Prescription only)

Identifiers
- IUPAC name: methyl (2E,11α,13E,15R)-11,15-dihydroxy-16,16-dimethyl-9-oxoprosta-2,13-dien-1-oate
- CAS Number: 64318-79-2
- PubChem CID: 5282237
- DrugBank: DB08964
- ChemSpider: 4445416
- UNII: 45KZB1FOLS
- KEGG: D02073
- CompTox Dashboard (EPA): DTXSID40895073
- ECHA InfoCard: 100.058.869

Chemical and physical data
- Formula: C_{23}H_{38}O_{5}
- Molar mass: 394.552 g·mol^{−1}
- 3D model (JSmol): Interactive image
- SMILES: O=C1C[C@@H](O)[C@H](/C=C/[C@@H](O)C(C)(C)CCCC)[C@H]1CCCC\C=C\C(=O)OC
- InChI: InChI=1S/C23H38O5/c1-5-6-15-23(2,3)21(26)14-13-18-17(19(24)16-20(18)25)11-9-7-8-10-12-22(27)28-4/h10,12-14,17-18,20-21,25-26H,5-9,11,15-16H2,1-4H3/b12-10+,14-13+/t17-,18-,20-,21-/m1/s1; Key:KYBOHGVERHWSSV-VNIVIJDLSA-N

Gemeprost (16, 16-dimethyl-trans-delta2 PGE_{1} methyl ester) is an analogue of prostaglandin E_{1}.

== Clinical use ==
It is used as a treatment for obstetric bleeding.

It is used with mifepristone to terminate pregnancy up to 24 weeks gestation.

== Side effects ==
Vaginal bleeding, cramps, nausea, vomiting, loose stools or diarrhea, headache, muscle weakness; dizziness; flushing; chills; backache; dyspnoea; chest pain; palpitations and mild pyrexia. Rare: Uterine rupture, severe hypotension, coronary spasms with subsequent myocardial infarctions.
