= Matthias Tavel =

French politician

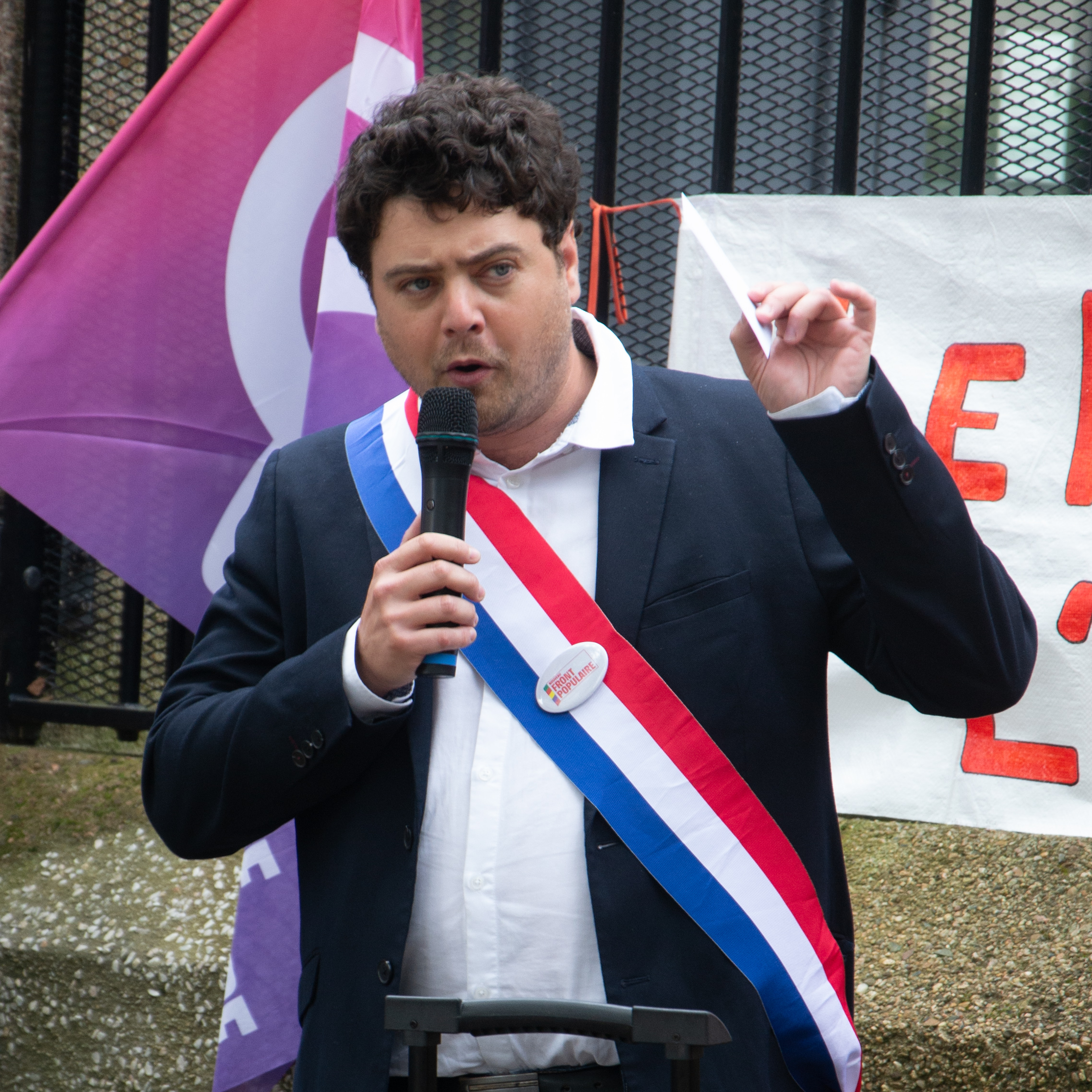
Image of Matthias Tavel

Matthias Tavel (born July 6, 1987, in Villeurbanne (Rhône)) is a French politician.

== Biography ==
=== Youth and education ===
Born in Villeurbanne, a suburb of Lyon, Matthias Tavel grew up in the Ain region. His childhood was marked by a Communist grandfather and a father sympathetic to the Socialist Party, who turned to Jean-Luc Mélenchon. He was admitted to the Institut d'études politiques de Paris after passing his baccalauréat with distinction. He graduated in 2010.

=== Political career ===
His first political involvement dates back to the 2002 presidential election, when he took part in a demonstration against Jean-Marie Le Pen's qualification for the second round. In 2005, he took part in the movement against the European Constitutional Treaty, writing two books on the subject. In his view, the European ideal has gone astray, bringing with it a litany of social ills: "posted work, break-up of public services, unfair competition, relocation". Hence "the idea of disobedience, of breaking with a certain number of European rules so that social progress once again becomes the compass".

In 2008, he joined the Left Party as soon as it was founded. In 2011, he became deputy chief of staff to party leader Jean-Luc Mélenchon. He left the cabinet in 2017. In 2019, during the investigation into MEPs' parliamentary assistants, he was accused of having worked for the Left Party rather than the European Parliament, an accusation he rejects.

In the 2019 European elections, he is candidate eighteenth on the France insoumise list led by Manon Aubry, which obtains 6.3% of the votes cast and six of the 74 French seats.

In the 2021 regional elections in Pays de la Loire, he is appointed leader of France insoumise. As part of a joint list with Europe Écologie Les Verts, he is a candidate on the list led by Matthieu Orphelin, who obtains 34.86% and 24 elected representatives, including Matthias Tavel in the Sarthe region.

A specialist in the maritime economy, he is co-editor of the programmatic booklet on the sea for La France insoumise's presidential campaign, and takes part in editing the magazine L'Insoumission hebdo, a publication founded by Jean-Luc Mélenchon in 1979 initially under the name Données et arguments.

Employed at the prefecture of the Sarthe département, he was the NUPES candidate in the eighth constituency of Loire-Atlantique in the 2022 legislative elections. In the second round he was elected deputy with 54.45% against the outgoing LREM candidate Audrey Dufeu-Schubert.
