= 1977 Swiss referendums =

Fourteen referendums were held in Switzerland in 1977. The first three were held on 13 March on popular initiatives on foreign infiltration, limiting naturalisation and changing the rules on referendums on treaties (which also had a counter-proposal). All three were rejected, whilst the counter-proposal was approved. The next two were held on 12 June on changes to sales tax and direct federal taxation (rejected) and on tax harmonisation (approved).

The next set of referendums was held on 25 September on popular initiatives on protecting tenants (rejected, with a counter-proposal also rejected), air pollution caused by motor vehicles (rejected), and a law allowing abortion in the first trimester of pregnancy (rejected), as well as on two government proposals to raise the number of signatures required for optional referendums (approved) and popular initiatives (approved).

The final four referendums were held on 4 December on a popular initiative on a wealth tax (rejected) and three federal law on political rights (approved), creating a civilian alternative to military service (rejected) and on balancing the federal budget (approved).

== Results ==
=== March: Foreign infiltration ===
Choice	Popular vote		Cantons		
Choice	Votes	%	Full	Half	Total
For	495,904	29.5	0	0	0
Against	1,182,820	70.5	19	6	22
Blank votes	29,949	–	–	–	–
Invalid votes	2,382	–	–	–	–
Total	1,711,055	100	19	6	22
Registered voters/turnout	3,785,693	45.2	–	–	–
Source: Nohlen & Stöver

=== March: Limiting naturalisation ===
Choice	Popular vote		Cantons		
Choice	Votes	%	Full	Half	Total
For	568,867	33.8	0	0	0
Against	1,116,188	66.2	19	6	22
Blank votes	24,673	–	–	–	–
Invalid votes	2,245	–	–	–	–
Total	1,711,973	100	19	6	22
Registered voters/turnout	3,785,693	45.2	–	–	–
Source: Nohlen & Stöver

=== March: Changes to treaty referendums ===
Choice	Popular initiative					Counterproposal				
Choice	Popular vote		Cantons			Popular vote		Cantons		
Choice	Votes	%	Full	Half	Total	Votes	%	Full	Half	Total
For	351,127	21.9	0	0	0	978,999	61.0	18	5	20.5
Against	1,158,376	72.2	19	6	22	502,825	31.3	1	1	1.5
No answer	94,944	5.9	–	–	–	122,623	7.6	–	–	–
Blank votes	69,935	–	–	–	–	69,935	–	–	–	–
Invalid votes	27,519	–	–	–	–	27,519	–	–	–	–
Total	1,701,901	100	19	6	22	1,701,901	100	19	6	22
Registered voters/turnout	3,785,693	45.0	–	–	–	3,785,693	45.0	–	–	–
Source: Direct Democracy

=== June: Changes to sales tax and direct federal tax ===
Choice	Popular vote		Cantons		
Choice	Votes	%	Full	Half	Total
For	760,830	40.5	1	0	1
Against	1,117,044	59.5	18	6	21
Blank votes	18,616	–	–	–	–
Invalid votes	1,778	–	–	–	–
Total	1,898,268	100	19	6	22
Registered voters/turnout	3,795,796	50.0	–	–	–
Source: Nohlen & Stöver

=== June: Tax harmonisation ===
Choice	Popular vote		Cantons		
Choice	Votes	%	Full	Half	Total
For	1,133,652	61.3	16	3	17.5
Against	715,072	38.7	3	3	4.5
Blank votes	43,906	–	–	–	–
Invalid votes	2,025	–	–	–	–
Total	1,894,655	100	19	6	22
Registered voters/turnout	3,795,796	49.9	–	–	–
Source: Nohlen & Stöver

=== September: Protection of tenants ===
Choice	Popular initiative					Counterproposal				
Choice	Popular vote		Cantons			Popular vote		Cantons		
Choice	Votes	%	Full	Half	Total	Votes	%	Full	Half	Total
For	796,825	42.2	3	1	3.5	777,604	41.2	1	2	2
Against	1,043,798	55.3	16	5	18.5	944,806	50.1	18	4	20
No answer	45,811	2.4	–	–	–	164,024	8.7	–	–	–
Blank votes	58,757	–	–	–	–	58,757	–	–	–	–
Invalid votes	20,990	–	–	–	–	20,990	–	–	–	–
Total	1,966,181	100	19	6	22	1,966,181	100	19	6	22
Registered voters/turnout	3,811,426	51.6	–	–	–	3,811,426	51.6	–	–	–
Source: Direct Democracy

=== September: Air pollution ===
Choice	Popular vote		Cantons		
Choice	Votes	%	Full	Half	Total
For	740,842	39.0	1	1	1.5
Against	1,157,368	61.0	18	5	20.5
Blank votes	68,519	–	–	–	–
Invalid votes	2,772	–	–	–	–
Total	1,969,501	100	19	6	22
Registered voters/turnout	3,811,426	51.7	–	–	–
Source: Nohlen & Stöver

=== September: Increasing the number of signatures required for optional referendums ===
Choice	Popular vote		Cantons		
Choice	Votes	%	Full	Half	Total
For	1,095,631	57.8	15	6	18
Against	798,416	42.2	4	0	4
Blank votes	69,730	–	–	–	–
Invalid votes	3,328	–	–	–	–
Total	1,967,555	100	19	6	22
Registered voters/turnout	3,811,426	51.6	–	–	–
Source: Nohlen & Stöver

=== September: Increasing the number of signatures required for popular initiatives ===
Choice	Popular vote		Cantons		
Choice	Votes	%	Full	Half	Total
For	1,068,157	56.7	16	6	19
Against	815,488	43.3	3	0	3
Blank votes	81,379	–	–	–	–
Invalid votes	2,999	–	–	–	–
Total	1,968,023	100	19	6	22
Registered voters/turnout	3,811,426	51.6	–	–	–
Source: Nohlen & Stöver

=== September: Abortion ===
Choice	Popular vote		Cantons		
Choice	Votes	%	Full	Half	Total
For	929,325	48.3	6	2	7
Against	994,930	51.7	13	4	15
Blank votes	51,680	–	–	–	–
Invalid votes	3,228	–	–	–	–
Total	1,979,163	100	19	6	22
Registered voters/turnout	3,811,426	51.9	–	–	–
Source: Nohlen & Stöver

=== December: Wealth tax ===
Choice	Popular vote		Cantons		
Choice	Votes	%	Full	Half	Total
For	637,994	44.4	2	1	2.5
Against	800,138	55.6	17	5	19.5
Blank votes	22,090	–	–	–	–
Invalid votes	1,264	–	–	–	–
Total	1,461,486	100	19	6	22
Registered voters/turnout	3,816,824	38.3	–	–	–
Source: Nohlen & Stöver

=== December: Political rights ===
Choice	Votes	%
For	809,862	59.4
Against	552,962	40.6
Blank votes	90,008	–
Invalid votes	1,688	–
Total	1,454,520	100
Registered voters/turnout	3,816,824	38.1
Source: Nohlen & Stöver

=== December: Civilian service ===
Choice	Popular vote		Cantons		
Choice	Votes	%	Full	Half	Total
For	533,733	37.6	0	0	0
Against	885,868	62.4	19	6	22
Blank votes	40,069	–	–	–	–
Invalid votes	1,503	–	–	–	–
Total	1,461,173	100	19	6	22
Registered voters/turnout	3,816,824	38.3	–	–	–
Source: Nohlen & Stöver

=== December: Balancing the federal budget ===
Choice	Votes	%
For	869,266	62.4
Against	523,125	37.6
Blank votes	62,749	–
Invalid votes	1,526	–
Total	1,456,666	100
Registered voters/turnout	3,816,824	38.2
Source: Nohlen & Stöver
