= 1985 Swiss referendums =

Twelve referendums were held in Switzerland in 1985. The first four were held on 10 March on abolishing primary school fees (approved), abolishing the government contribution to healthcare spending (approved), a federal resolution on education fees (rejected) and a popular initiative on extending paid leave (rejected). The next set of four was held on 9 June on the "right to life" popular initiative (rejected), abolishing the cantonal share of profits from banks' stamp duty (approved), a federal resolution on the taxation raised from the sale of spirits (approved), and the abolition of grants for the self-supply of breadstuffs (approved).

A further three referendums were held on 22 September on a popular initiative to co-ordinate the start of the school year (approved), a federal resolution on giving small and medium enterprises an advantage in cases on innovations (rejected), and amendments to the Swiss Civil Code (approved). The final referendum was held on 1 December on a popular initiative to ban vivisection, which was rejected.

== Results ==
=== March: Abolition of primary school fees ===
Choice	Popular vote		Cantons		
Choice	Votes	%	Full	Half	Total
For	802,882	58.5	15	6	18
Against	570,221	41.5	5	0	5
Blank votes	46,403	–	–	–	–
Invalid votes	1,932	–	–	–	–
Total	1,421,438	100	20	6	23
Registered voters/turnout	4,134,052	34.4	–	–	–
Source: Nohlen & Stöver

=== March: Healthcare ===
Choice	Popular vote		Cantons		
Choice	Votes	%	Full	Half	Total
For	726,781	53.0	10	6	13
Against	644,649	47.0	10	0	10
Blank votes	48,766	–	–	–	–
Invalid votes	1,951	–	–	–	–
Total	1,422,147	100	20	6	23
Registered voters/turnout	4,134,052	34.4	–	–	–
Source: Nohlen & Stöver

=== March: Education fees ===
Choice	Popular vote		Cantons		
Choice	Votes	%	Full	Half	Total
For	651,854	47.6	7	3	8.5
Against	716,717	52.4	13	3	14.5
Blank votes	51,614	–	–	–	–
Invalid votes	2,020	–	–	–	–
Total	1,422,205	100	20	6	23
Registered voters/turnout	4,134,052	34.4	–	–	–
Source: Nohlen & Stöver

=== March: Extending paid leave ===
Choice	Popular vote		Cantons		
Choice	Votes	%	Full	Half	Total
For	489,995	34.8	2	0	2
Against	918,685	65.2	18	6	21
Blank votes	19,961	–	–	–	–
Invalid votes	1,729	–	–	–	–
Total	1,430,370	100	20	6	23
Registered voters/turnout	4,134,052	34.6	–	–	–
Source: Nohlen & Stöver

=== June: Right to life ===
Choice	Popular vote		Cantons		
Choice	Votes	%	Full	Half	Total
For	448,016	31.0	4	3	5.5
Against	999,077	69.0	16	3	17.5
Blank votes	31,856	–	–	–	–
Invalid votes	1,523	–	–	–	–
Total	1,480,472	100	20	6	23
Registered voters/turnout	4,144,312	35.7	–	–	–
Source: Nohlen & Stöver

=== June: Stamp duty for banks ===
Choice	Popular vote		Cantons		
Choice	Votes	%	Full	Half	Total
For	903,345	66.5	19	6	22
Against	454,560	33.5	1	0	1
Blank votes	100,995	–	–	–	–
Invalid votes	1,794	–	–	–	–
Total	1,460,694	100	20	6	23
Registered voters/turnout	4,144,312	35.2	–	–	–
Source: Nohlen & Stöver

=== June: Tax on spirits ===
Choice	Popular vote		Cantons		
Choice	Votes	%	Full	Half	Total
For	982,318	72.3	19	6	22
Against	376,135	27.7	1	0	1
Blank votes	100,479	–	–	–	–
Invalid votes	1,839	–	–	–	–
Total	1,460,771	100	20	6	23
Registered voters/turnout	4,144,312	35.2	–	–	–
Source: Nohlen & Stöver

=== June: Breadstuffs ===
Choice	Popular vote		Cantons		
Choice	Votes	%	Full	Half	Total
For	787,156	57.0	16	5	18.5
Against	592,751	43.0	4	1	4.5
Blank votes	82,030	–	–	–	–
Invalid votes	1,697	–	–	–	–
Total	1,463,634	100	20	6	23
Registered voters/turnout	4,144,312	35.3	–	–	–
Source: Nohlen & Stöver

=== September: Co-ordinating the start of the School year ===
Choice	Popular vote		Cantons		
Choice	Votes	%	Full	Half	Total
For	984,463	58.8	14	4	16
Against	688,459	41.2	6	2	7
Blank votes	30,555	–	–	–	–
Invalid votes	2,223	–	–	–	–
Total	1,705,700	100	20	6	23
Registered voters/turnout	4,160,547	41.0	–	–	–
Source: Nohlen & Stöver

=== September: Innovations ===
Choice	Votes	%
For	695,288	43.1
Against	917,507	56.9
Blank votes	84,782	–
Invalid votes	2,639	–
Total	1,700,216	100
Registered voters/turnout	4,160,547	40.9
Source: Nohlen & Stöver

=== September: Changes to the Civil Code ===
Choice	Votes	%
For	921,743	54.7
Against	762,619	45.3
Blank votes	23,290	–
Invalid votes	2,223	–
Total	1,709,875	100
Registered voters/turnout	4,160,547	41.1
Source: Nohlen & Stöver

=== December: Banning vivisection ===
Choice	Popular vote		Cantons		
Choice	Votes	%	Full	Half	Total
For	459,358	29.5	0	0	0
Against	1,099,122	70.5	20	6	23
Blank votes	21,118	–	–	–	–
Invalid votes	2,680	–	–	–	–
Total	1,582,278	100	20	6	23
Registered voters/turnout	4,167,376	38.0	–	–	–
Source: Nohlen & Stöver
