= Gedeon Richter (company) =

Hungarian pharmaceutical company

Gedeon Richter Plc.
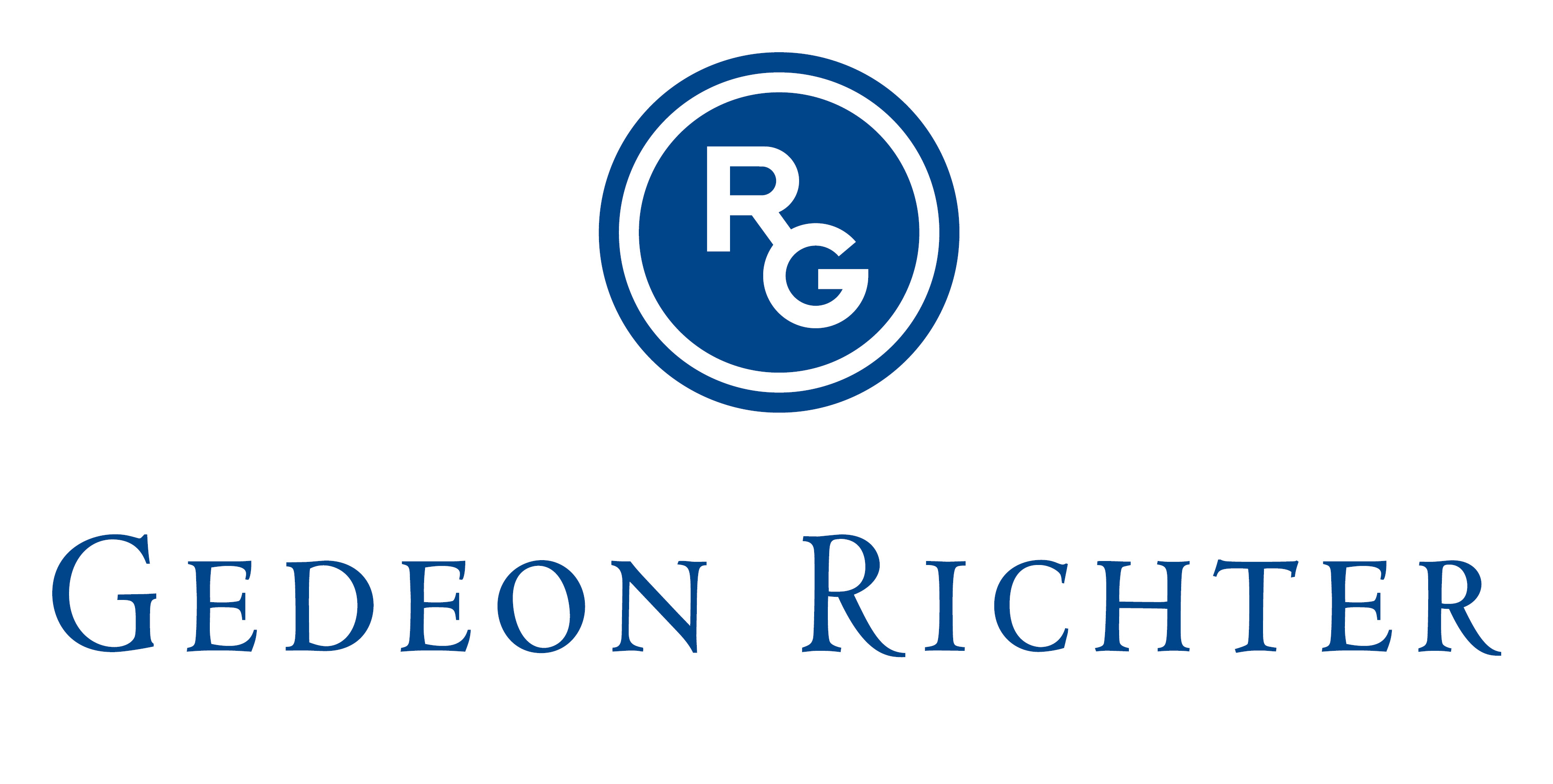

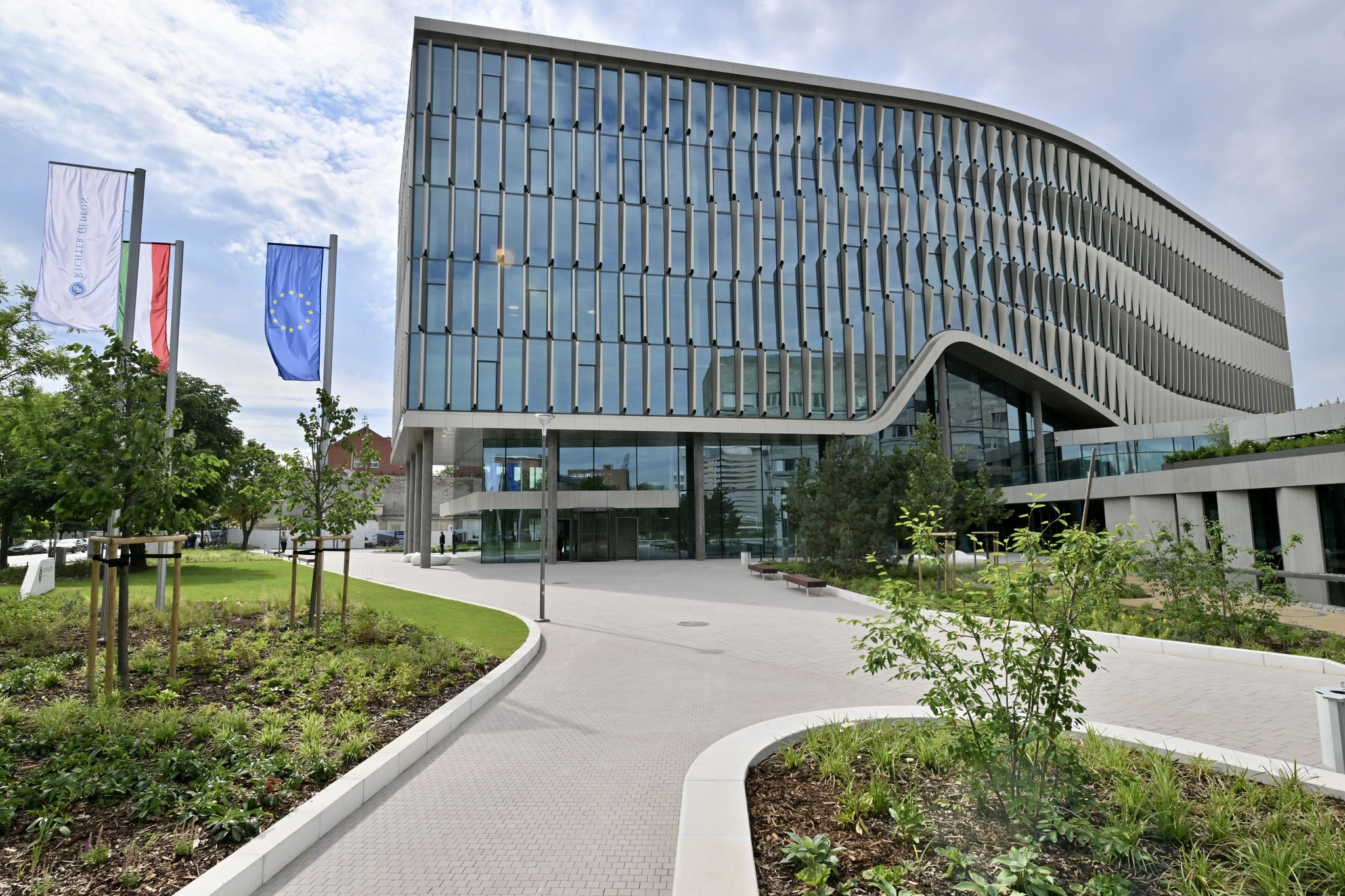
- Gedeon Richter Headquarters in Budapest
- Type: Public
- Traded as: BPSE: RICHTER; BUX Component
- Industry: Biotechnology; Pharmaceuticals
- Founded: 1901
- Founder: Gedeon Richter
- Headquarters: 47°28′6.90″N 19°8′55.17″E, Budapest
- Area served: Worldwide
- Key people: Prof. Dr. E. Szilveszter Vizi (Chairman); Gábor Orbán (CEO); Erik Bogsch (Lifetime Honorary Chairman)
- Products: Medicines; Pharmaceuticals
- Revenue: HUF 928.962 billion (2025)
- Operating income: HUF 292.851 billion (2025)
- Net income: HUF 232.335 billion (2025)
- Total assets: HUF 1.698 trillion (2025)
- Total equity: HUF 1.401 trillion (2025)
- Number of employees: 12,696 (2018)
- Subsidiaries: Helm BioTec; Medimpex; Preglem
- Website: www.gedeonrichter.com

Gedeon Richter Plc. is a Hungarian multinational pharmaceutical and biotechnology company headquartered in Budapest. Founded in 1901 by pharmacist Gedeon Richter, it is listed on the Budapest Stock Exchange under the ticker symbol RICHTER and is a constituent of the BUX Index.

== History ==
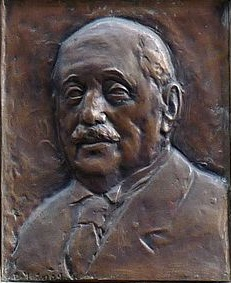
In 1901, pharmacist Gedeon Richter founded the company in Budapest.

=== Early history ===
In 1901, the pharmacist Gedeon Richter founded the company, when he first received a license to industrially produce medicines.

Initially, small-scale pharmaceutical production took place in the Arany Sas (Golden Eagle) Pharmacy, which still operates today. At the time pharmaceutical production on an industrial scale required heavy investments, and large-scale pharmaceutical manufacturing activities were considered to be extremely capital-intensive operations. Initially, the laboratory processed extracts from organs of animals and produced organotherapeutic drugs.

The plant was built in 1907 in the Kőbánya suburb of Budapest and was Hungary's first pharmaceutical manufacturing plant and regarded as an outstanding technological achievement in its day. In compliance with the established international trends of the pharmaceutical industry in those days, the company produced herbal drugs, processed extracts from plants and manufactured synthetic products at a later date. The company became a highly recognized manufacturer of lecithin products, antiseptics (Hyperol), as well as brands of Aspirin, and adrenalin, which continue to be in use. In 1934, Constant Janssen, of the future Janssen Pharmaceuticals, acquired the distribution rights for Gedeon Richter's products.

The company was nationalized in 1948 and remained fully state-owned until 1994.

In the 1970s, chemists at the Gedeon Richter Chemical Works in Budapest discovered the brain enhancing drug vinpocetine,. This drug was introduced to the market in 1977 and became its most successful new product, marketed as Cavinton for treament for cerebrovascular disorders such as stroke and dementia.

In 1995 Gedeon Richter signed a contract with Danco Laboratories to market an abortion pill mifepristone in the US. Danco resolved to contracting Gedeon, because its prior attempts to find a US distributor failed due to "the politically volatile climate surrounding abortion in this country [the USA]." Facing a strong opposition from the US pro-life groups, Gedeon decided in 1997 to end its efforts to place mifepristone on the U.S. market. On May 9, 1997 Danco filed a lawsuit against Gedeon, because they lost over $200 million due to the Gedeon's breach of contract.

=== Recent history ===
In May 2006 Gedeon Richter signed a development and supply agreement with the US-based company Repros Therapeutics to produce Proellex. In July 2007 Gedeon Richter signed a contract with Barr Pharma for the production of terbinafine, originally Novartis' Lamisil, where Barr paid Gedeon Richter a royalty for distributing the product in the U.S.

From July 2008 - April 2012, the company constructed a new manufacturing facility ($110 million) in Debrecen.

In October 2010, Gedeon Richter acquired 100% of a private Swiss biopharmaceutical company, PregLem, for CHF 445 million (€337 million). PregLem is focused on the treatment of gynecological conditions and infertility.

In 2015, Stada Arzneimittel AG and Gedeon Richter signed a license and distribution agreement to commercialize Richter's biosimilar Pegfilgrastim in Europe. According to the agreement Stada receives non-exclusive distribution rights for the area of geographical Europe (excluding Russia), while Richter retains its rights to distribute and market biosimilar Pegfilgrastim worldwide.

In January 2017, William de Gelsey resigned as chairman of Gedeon Richter. He was replaced by former CEO Erik Bogsch, who was chief executive officer of Gedeon Richter from 1992 to November 2017. As the new CEO he appointed Gabor Orban, a former fund manager, government official and Bogsch's deputy since 2016. De Gelsey remained a board member until his death.

In April 2017, Evestra signed a collaboration partnership agreement with Gedeon Richter. In February 2019, Gedeon Richter and Pantarhei Bioscience signed a license and supply agreement for the commercialization of a novel combined oral contraceptive.

In September 2018 the company started collaborating with the company Mithra Pharmaceuticals to distribute its contraceptive, Estelle, in Europe and Russia.

Richter's atypical antipsychotic, Reagila, containing the active ingredient cariprazine, was awarded the prize of Medicine of the Year 2019 by the Hungarian Society for Experimental and Clinical Pharmacology (MFT).

== Corporate affairs ==
=== Organization and operations ===
As of April 2019, Gedeon Richter had subsidiaries in various countries: Gedeon Richter Polska (Poland), Gedeon Richter Romania and Gedeon Richter RUS (Russia) are regional production subsidiaries. Richter-Themis Medicare (India) (51% Gedeon Richter, 49% Themis), Richter-Helm BioLogics and BioTec (Germany), Mediplus N.V. (Curaçao), Gedeon Richter Mexico, S.A.P.I. de C.V., Gedeon Richter Do Brasil Importadora, Exportadora E Distribuidora S.A. and Gedeon Richter Columbia S.A.S. are international subsidiaries in production and distribution.

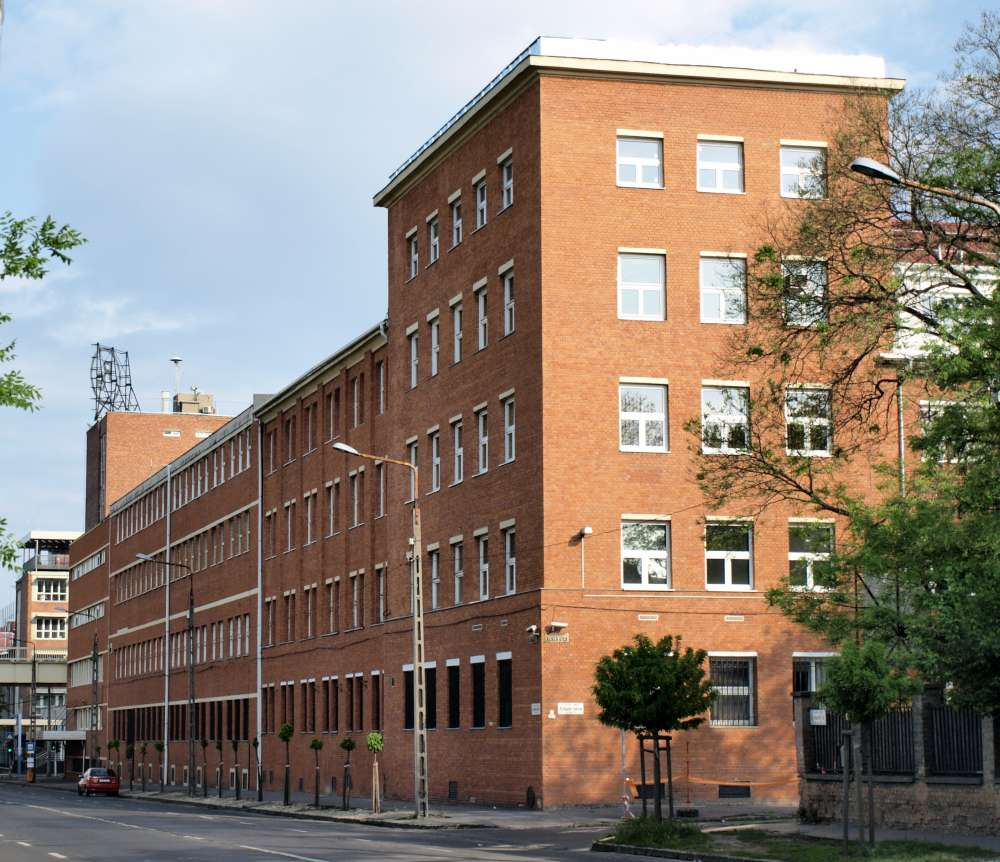
Production building of the company in Budapest

As of this date, the corporation has three plants: the headquarters in Budapest, a subsidiary in Dorog (operating since 1967), and a biotechnology plant in Debrecen (operating since 2012). The company has joint ventures in India with Themis Medicare, and in Germany, with Helm AG.

=== Leadership structure ===
The company's chief governing body is the board of directors. The board's chairman is Erik Bogsch, who had been chief executive officer since 1992 and was succeeded by Gábor Orbán as CEO in November 2017. The company's other governing bodies are the executive board and the supervisory board; as of January 2026, the executive board was led by Erik Bogsch and the supervisory board was led by Lívia Pavlik.

=== Shareholder structure ===
As of December 2018, Gedeon Richter's shareholder structure is:

- 66% - International investors
- 25% - Hungarian State (Hungarian State Holding Company, MNV Zrt.)
- 9% - Domestic investors

In 2018, the dividends approved by the shareholders of Gedeon Richter were EUR 41 million in total.

=== Company philanthropy ===
In 2006, Gedeon Richter gifted a large sum to the International Union of Pure and Applied Chemistry (IUPAC), thereby establishing the IUPAC–Richter Prize in Medicinal Chemistry. The $10,000 prize is awarded every second year to an internationally recognized scientist (normally a medicinal chemist), whose research or publications have made a significant contribution to the practice of medicinal chemistry. The prize was initiated to honor and highlight the central role of medicinal chemistry in improving human health.

== Awards and recognition ==
In 2017, Gedeon Richter was recognized by the Hungarian Innovation Foundation with the Innovation Grand Prize for the development of Cariprazine, an antipsychotic drug which is used in the treatment of schizophrenia and bipolar disorders.

== See also ==
- Economy of Budapest
- Economy of Hungary
- Science and technology in Hungary
