= Foster the People discography =

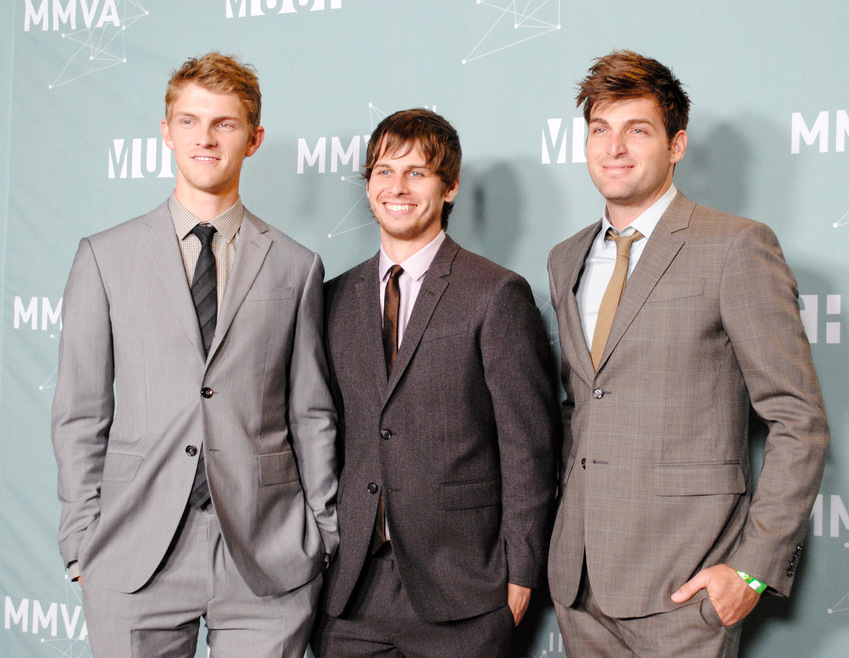
- Foster the People at the 2011 MuchMusic Video Awards, from left to right: original members Mark Pontius, founder Mark Foster, and Cubbie Fink
- Studio albums: 4
- Extended plays: 8
- Singles: 29
- Music videos: 19
- Promotional singles: 4

The discography of American indie pop band Foster the People consists of four studio albums, eight extended plays (including three mixtapes), 29 singles, and 19 music videos.

Mark Foster founded the band in 2009 after spending several years in Los Angeles as a struggling musician and working as a commercial jingle writer. After Foster's song "Pumped Up Kicks" became a viral success in 2010, the group was signed to Columbia Records imprint Startime International and gained a fanbase through small club shows and appearances at the music festivals Coachella and South by Southwest. After releasing their debut album Torches in May 2011, "Pumped Up Kicks" became a crossover hit on commercial radio, reaching number one on the Billboard Alternative Songs chart and number 3 on the Billboard Hot 100, while also becoming successful in international markets. The success of "Pumped Up Kicks" also propelled Torches to number 8 on the Billboard 200 chart. Four other singles were released from the album, including "Helena Beat", "Don't Stop (Color on the Walls)", and "Houdini", all of which entered the Alternative Songs chart.

== Albums ==
=== Studio albums ===
List of studio albums, with selected chart positions and certifications
Title	Album details	Peak chart positions										Certifications
Title	Album details	US	AUS	BEL (FL)	CAN	FRA	IRL	NLD	NZ	SWI	UK	Certifications
Torches	Released: May 23, 2011 (US); Label: Startime, Columbia; Formats: CD, LP, digital download	8	1	69	7	29	13	53	18	49	12	RIAA: 3× Platinum; ARIA: Platinum; BPI: Gold; MC: Platinum; SNEP: Gold
Supermodel	Released: March 18, 2014 (US); Label: Columbia; Formats: CD, LP, digital download	3	8	93	4	51	24	57	17	17	26	
Sacred Hearts Club	Released: July 21, 2017; Label: Columbia; Formats: CD, LP, digital download	47	71	—	54	180	—	85	— (Note: Sacred Hearts Club did not enter the NZ Top 40 Albums Chart, but peaked at number 10 on the NZ Heatseeker Albums Chart.)	—	— (Note: Sacred Hearts Club did not enter the UK Albums Chart, but peaked at number 95 on the UK Album Downloads Chart.)	RIAA: Gold
Paradise State of Mind	Released: August 16, 2024; Label: Atlantic; Format: CD, LP, digital download, streaming	170	—	—	—	— (Note: Paradise State of Mind did not enter the France Albums Chart but peaked at number 163 on the French Physical Albums Chart.)	—	—	—	—	— (Note: Paradise State of Mind did not enter the UK Albums Chart, but peaked at number 17 on the UK Album Sales Chart.)	
"—" denotes a recording that did not chart or was not released in that territory.

=== Re-issued albums ===
Title	Details
Torches X (Deluxe Edition)	Released: November 12, 2021 (US); Label: Columbia, Legacy; Formats: Digital download

== Extended plays ==
List of extended plays
Title	Details
Foster the People	Released: January 18, 2011 (US); Label: Startime, Columbia; Formats: Digital download
Spotify Sessions – Live from The Village	Released: April 15, 2014 (US); Label: Columbia; Formats: Streamed audio
III	Released: April 27, 2017 (US); Label: Columbia; Formats: Digital download, streamed audio
Pick U Up	Released: September 6, 2019 (US); Label: Spotify; Formats: Streamed audio
In the Darkest of Nights, Let the Birds Sing	Released: December 11, 2020 (US); Label: Self-released; Formats: Digital download

=== Mixtapes ===
Title	Details
Melody & Silence (with The Knocks)	Released: March 19, 2021 (US); Label: Big Beat Records; Formats: Digital download
FTP Winter 2026 (DJ Mix)	Released: January 29, 2026 (US); Label: Apple Music; Formats: Streamed audio
FTP Spring 2026 (DJ Mix)	Released: May 18, 2026 (US); Label: Apple Music / SoundCloud; Formats: Streamed audio

== Singles ==
=== As lead artist ===
List of singles, with selected chart positions and certifications, showing year released and album name
Title	Year	Peak chart positions										Certifications	Album
Title	Year	US	US Rock	AUS	CAN	CZR	FRA	JPN	NLD	SWI	UK	Certifications	Album
"Pumped Up Kicks"	2010	3	3	1	3	5	10	9	35	17	18	RIAA: 14× Platinum; ARIA: 18× Platinum; BPI: 5× Platinum; MC: 5× Platinum; RMNZ: 9× Platinum	Torches
"Helena Beat"	2011	— (Note: "Helena Beat" did not enter the Billboard Hot 100, but peaked at number 21 on the Bubbling Under Hot 100 Singles chart, which acts as an extension to the Hot 100.)	15	74	70	—	—	—	—	—	—	RIAA: 2× Platinum; MC: Gold; RMNZ: Gold	Torches
"Call It What You Want"	2011	—	—	39	—	—	—	75	— (Note: "Call It What You Want" did not enter the Netherlands Singles Chart but peaked on the Dutch Tipparade Chart at number three.)	— (Note: "Call It What You Want" did not enter the Swiss Singles chart, but charted at number 82 on the Swiss Airplay chart.)	139	RIAA: Gold; ARIA: Gold; BPI: Silver; RMNZ: Gold	Torches
"Don't Stop (Color on the Walls)"	2012	86	8	—	56	—	121	—	—	—	—	RIAA: Platinum; MC: Gold	Torches
"Houdini"	2012	—	— (Note: "Houdini" did not enter the Hot Rock & Alternative Songs chart, but peaked at number 41 on the Rock Digital Songs chart.)	—	—	—	—	70	98	—	—	RIAA: Platinum; RMNZ: Gold	Torches
"Ruby"	2012	—	—	—	—	—	—	—	—	—	—		Non-album single
"Coming of Age"	2014	— (Note: "Coming of Age" did not enter the Billboard Hot 100, but peaked at number three on the Bubbling Under Hot 100 Singles chart, which acts as an extension to the Hot 100.)	14	64	69	38	—	44	—	— (Note: "Coming of Age" did not enter the Swiss Singles chart, but charted at number 54 on the Swiss Airplay chart.)	158	RIAA: Gold	Supermodel
"Pseudologia Fantastica"	2014	—	31	—	—	—	118	—	—	—	—		Supermodel
"Best Friend"	2014	— (Note: "Best Friend" did not enter the Billboard Hot 100, but peaked at number 19 on the Bubbling Under Hot 100 Singles chart, which acts as an extension to the Hot 100.)	21	—	86	—	150	—	—	— (Note: "Best Friend" did not enter the Swiss Singles chart, but charted at number 99 on the Swiss Airplay chart.)	—		Supermodel
"Are You What You Want to Be?"	2014	—	42	—	—	—	—	—	—	—	—		Supermodel
"The Unforeseeable Fate of Mr. Jones"	2015	—	—	—	—	—	—	—	—	—	—		Non-album single
"Doing It for the Money"	2017	—	37	—	—	—	—	—	—	—	—		Sacred Hearts Club
"Loyal Like Sid & Nancy"	2017	—	—	—	—	—	—	—	—	—	—		Sacred Hearts Club
"Sit Next to Me"	2017	42	5	—	68	16	—	—	— (Note: "Sit Next to Me" did not enter the Netherlands' Single Top 100 but peaked on the Netherlands' Single Tip Chart at number 11.)	—	—	RIAA: 4× Platinum; MC: Platinum; RMNZ: Platinum	Sacred Hearts Club
"Pay the Man (Remix)" (featuring JID & Saba)	2017	—	—	—	—	—	—	—	—	—	—		Non-album singles
"Worst Nites"	2018	—	18	—	—	—	—	—	—	—	—		Non-album singles
"Style"	2019	—	35	—	—	—	—	—	—	—	—		Non-album singles
"Imagination"	2019	—	20	—	—	—	—	—	—	—	—		Non-album singles
"Pick U Up"	2019	—	24	—	—	—	—	—	—	—	—		Non-album singles
"Every Color" (with Louis the Child) (Note: "Every Color" peaked at number 12 on the Dance/Electronic Songs chart.)	2020	—	—	—	—	—	—	—	—	—	—		Here for Now
"It's OK to Be Human"	2020	—	—	—	—	—	—	—	—	—	—		Non-album single
"Lamb's Wool" (solo or with Poolside)	2020	—	36	—	—	—	—	—	—	—	—		In the Darkest of Nights, Let the Birds Sing EP
"The Things We Do"	2020	—	— (Note: "The Things We Do" did not enter the Hot Rock & Alternative Songs chart, but peaked at number 25 on the Alternative Digital Songs chart.)	—	—	—	—	—	—	—	—		In the Darkest of Nights, Let the Birds Sing EP
"Broken Jaw"	2021	—	—	—	—	—	—	—	—	—	— (Note: "Broken Jaw" did not enter the UK Singles Chart, but peaked at number 32 on the UK Physical Singles Chart.)		Torches X
"Chin Music for the Unsuspecting Hero"	2021	—	—	—	—	—	—	—	—	—	—		Torches X
"Lost in Space"	2024	—	— (Note: "Lost in Space" did not enter the Hot Rock & Alternative Songs chart, but peaked at number 36 on the Rock & Alternative Airplay chart.)	—	—	—	—	— (Note: "Lost in Space" did not enter the Japan Hot 100, but peaked at number 20 on the Japan Hot Overseas chart.)	—	—	—		Paradise State of Mind
"Take Me Back"	2024	—	—	—	—	—	—	—	—	—	—		Paradise State of Mind
"Chasing Low Vibrations"	2024	—	—	—	—	—	—	—	—	—	—		Paradise State of Mind
"JET LAGGED" (with Lava La Rue)	2025	—	—	—	—	—	—	—	—	—	—		Non-album single
"—" denotes a recording that did not chart or was not released in that territory.

=== As featured artist ===
Title	Year	Peak chart positions									Certifications	Album
Title	Year	US Alt.	US Dance	US Rock Air.	AUS Hit.	BEL (FL) Tip	BEL (WA) Tip	CAN Rock	RUS	NZ	Certifications	Album
"Warrior" (Kimbra featuring Mark Foster and A-Trak)	2012	—	—	—	16	57	—	—	—	22		Vows
"Nonsense" (Madeon featuring Mark Foster)	2015	—	35	—	—	—	—	—	—	—		Adventure
"Ride or Die" (The Knocks featuring Foster the People)	2018	16	20	28	—	—	—	—	86	—	RIAA: Gold	New York Narcotic
"Blur" (MØ featuring Foster the People)	2018	35	—	—	—	—	21	36	—	—		Forever Neverland
"All About You" (The Knocks featuring Foster the People)	2020	17	20	33	—	—	—	38	—	—		HISTORY
"Hyperlandia" (deadmau5 featuring Foster the People)	2021	—	24	—	—	—	—	—	—	—		Non-album single
"—" denotes a recording that did not chart or was not released in that territory.

=== Promotional singles ===
Title	Year	Album
"Nevermind" (alternate version)	2014	Supermodel
"I Love My Friends"	2017	Sacred Hearts Club
"Under the Moon"	2020	In the Darkest of Nights, Let the Birds Sing EP
"Pumped Up Kicks" (Gus Dapperton version)	2021	Torches X

=== Other charted and certified songs ===
List of songs, with selected chart positions and certifications, showing year released and album name
Title	Year	Peak chart positions			Certifications	Album
Title	Year	US Rock	JPN Over.	LVA	Certifications	Album
"I Would Do Anything for You"	2011	—	—	—	RIAA: Gold	Torches
"SHC"	2017	50	—	—		III EP
"See You in the Afterlife"	2024	—	17	—		Paradise State of Mind
"See You in the Afterlife"(MPH Remix)	2024	—	—	9		Non-album single
"—" denotes a recording that did not chart or was not released in that territory.

== Remixes ==
Title	Year	Artist(s)	Album
"The Edge of Glory" (Foster the People Remix)	2011	Lady Gaga	Born This Way: The Remix
"Colours" (Foster the People Remix)	2011	Grouplove	none
"Blue Jeans" (Smims & Belle Remix featuring Azealia Banks)	2012	Lana Del Rey	Blue Jeans (Remixes) EP
"Hide and Seek" (Foster the People Remix)	2016	Nanakato!	Non-album singles
"Nobody's Favourite" (Foster the People Rework)	2020	Mobley	Non-album singles
"Last Christmas / Talk of the Town (Mixed)" (Foster the People Edit)	2026	Wham!, Fred Again, Sammy Virji, Reggie	FTP Winter 2026 (DJ Mix) EP

== Other appearances ==
=== Guest appearances ===
Title	Year	Original artist	Album
"Machu Picchu" (Foster the People Cover)	2012	The Strokes	BBC Radio 1's Live Lounge 2012

=== Production credits ===
Title	Year	Artist	Album
"Hide and Seek" (original version)	2016	Nanakato!	Non-album single

=== Interpolations ===
Selected interpolations by other artists
Title	Year	Peak chart positions			Certifications	Album
Title	Year	BEL	NOR	SWE	Certifications	Album
"Pumped Up" (Klingande)	2017	82	22	71	FIMI: Gold	The Album

- Sampled in "XOXO" by Feng (2026)

== Songs ==
=== Bonus tracks ===
List of limited release bonus tracks
Title	Year	Album
"Ruby" (alternate version)	2011	none
"Tabloid Super Junkie"	2014	Supermodel (pre-order edition)
"Cassius Clay's Pearly Whites"	2014	Supermodel (Japanese release)
"The Unforeseeable Fate of Mr. Jones"	2015	Exclusive to BitTorrent
"Rabies Shmabies"	2024	Paradise State of Mind (Japanese release)
"Call Me Back"	2025	Exclusive to LatAm mailing list
"ID1 (Mixed)" (as Foster the People / "ID") (Note: "ID" is used as a placeholder in both the song title and artist name. Per industry practice, "ID" denotes the track's as yet untitled (and uncredited) status; despite its semi-official release. (The SoundCloud release of each track indicates Foster the People are the lead artist.))	2026	FTP Winter 2026 (DJ Mix) EP (exclusive to Apple Music)
"ID (from FTP Spring 2026)" / "Needle Guy (Mixed)" (as Foster the People / "ID" with Dylan Brady)	2026	FTP Spring 2026 (DJ Mix) EP (streaming only)

=== Side projects ===
Title	Year	Album
"Untitled" / "Breathe In" / "The Otherside" / "Annabelle" / "Cost of Love" / "Landslide" (Sean Cimino as Fairchild)	2006	Terminal EP
"Echo" / "Black and White" / "Love Brings Me Down" / "In the Middle" / "Newspaper" (Note: Matt and Isom also released the album August Jesus Depression (2008), along with remixes of "The City Is at War" (2009) and "London Bridges". Their catalogue includes a number of other songs that have been performed live but not officially released.) (Matt Wilcox and Isom Innis as Matt and Isom)	2007	The Black and White EP
"F'n Head (Psychedelia Version — Isom Innis Mix)" / "We At the Disco (Southern Belle Remix)" (The Chain Gang of 1974)	2009	Guerilla
"Conditional Love" / "Walk Out" / "Psycho Killa" / "Loup-garou" / "Noise" / "Just Friends" / "Please Leave" / "Everytime (Remix)" / "Older Brother (Remix)" (Note: Innis' early solo work also includes a remix of "Good Girls Go Bad", "Bottles from the Shelf" featuring Xander Singh (both 2009), and the single "Freak Show" (2014).) (Isom Innis as Southern Belle)	2010	none
"Halo" (Shuttle featuring Isom Innis)	2012	Halo EP
"Nostroke" (Isom Innis as Saol Álainn)	2013	Non-album singles
"Cis.Cism" (Saol Álainn)	2014	Non-album singles
"When You Find Love" (Stephan Altman and Mark Foster with Peter Barbee and Mark Pontius)	2015	Little Boy (Original Motion Picture Soundtrack)
"Holy Water" (Gabe Simon and Mark Pontius as Mr Gabriel)	2017	Non-album singles
"Glad I Tried (Isom Innis Remix)" (Matt and Kim featuring Kevin Ray, Travis Hawley, and Santigold)	2018	Non-album singles
"Setting" (Tyler Chester with Sean Cimino)	2019	Firstborn
"Complainer (Dr. Iceman Remix)" (Cold War Kids; Isom Innis as Dr. Iceman)	2019	Complainer (Remixes) EP
"Pick U Up (Dr. Iceman Remix)" (Foster the People)	2019	Non-album singles
"Jump Into the Sirens" (Isom Innis / Peel)	2020	Non-album singles
"Catch & Release" / "Rom-Com" / "Persona" / "Peel" / "Citizen X" (Isom Innis and Sean Cimino as Peel)	2020	Peel EP
Various (Peel)	2024	Acid Star
Various (Isom Innis)	2024	Upgraded (Original Motion Picture Soundtrack)

== Covers ==
List of unreleased cover songs
Title	Year	Original artist(s)	Details	Ref.
"Hold On" (featuring Luke Pritchard)	2012	Alabama Shakes	Live at Brixton Academy	
"Under Control"	2014	Calvin Harris and Alesso featuring Hurts	For BBC Radio 1 with Zane Lowe	
"Hold On, We're Going Home"	2014	Drake featuring Majid Jordan	For BBC Radio 1's Live Lounge with Fearne Cotton	
"Feels Like We Only Go Backwards"	2014	Tame Impala	For RTL2 (France)	

== Music videos ==
=== As lead artist ===
List of music videos as lead artist, showing year released and director(s)
Title	Year	Director(s)
"Pumped Up Kicks"	2011	Josef Geiger
"Helena Beat"	2011	Ace Norton
"Call It What You Want"	2011	Ace Norton
"Don't Stop (Color on the Walls)"	2011	Daniels
"Houdini"	2012	Daniels
Medley: "Surfer Girl" / "Wouldn't It Be Nice" / "Good Vibrations" (live at the 54th Annual Grammy Awards) (with The Beach Boys and Maroon 5)	2012	—N/a
"Coming of Age"	2014	BRTHR
"Best Friend"	2014	Ben Brewer
"Pseudologia Fantastica"	2014	Mark Foster
"Ghetto Blastah" (as Smims & Belle)	2015	Michele Civetta
"Doing It for the Money"	2017	Daniel Henry
"Sit Next to Me"	2017	Fourclops & Brinton Bryan
"Worst Nites"	2018	Mark Foster & Josh Hutcherson
"Style"	2019	Mark Foster
"Imagination"	2019	Mark Foster
"Pick U Up"	2019	Mark Foster
"Lamb's Wool"	2021	Thomas Jarrett
"Lost in Space"	2024	Rupert Höller
"See You in the Afterlife" / "Feed Me"	2025	Laura Gordon, Jackson James & Ryan Ohm

=== As featured artist ===
List of music videos as featured artist, showing year released and director(s)
Title	Year	Director(s)
"Warrior" (Kimbra featuring Mark Foster and A-Trak)	2012	Daniels
"Ride or Die" (The Knocks featuring Foster the People)	2018	Kenny Laubbacher & Joel Knoernschild
"Blur" (MØ featuring Foster the People)	2018	Lauren Sick
"All About You" (The Knocks featuring Foster the People)	2021	Nathan R. Smith
"South Side" (visualizer) (The Knocks with Foster the People)	2021	—N/a
"All About You (Sunrise Version)" (visualizer) (The Knocks featuring Foster the People)	2021	—N/a
"Bittersweet Symphony" (visualizer) (The Knocks with Foster the People)	2021	—N/a
"JET LAGGED" (Lava La Rue with Foster the People)	2025	Nine Screens (Dylan Coates & Travis Barton)
