= Pseudologia Fantastica (song) =

Single by Foster the People

from the album Supermodel
- Released: February 25, 2014
- Recorded: 2013
- Genre: Indie rock; neo-psychedelia
- Length: 5:31
- Label: Columbia
- Songwriters: Paul Epworth; Mark Foster
- Producers: Paul Epworth; Mark Foster

Foster the People singles chronology
"Coming of Age" (2014)	"Pseudologia Fantastica" (2014)	"Best Friend" (2014)

"Pseudologia Fantastica" is a song by American indie pop band Foster the People. It is the fifth track on their second studio album Supermodel and was released digitally as the record's second single on February 25, 2014.

== Music video ==
The music video for "Pseudologia Fantastica" was conceptualized and directed by the band's frontman Mark Foster, with additional direction and animation being carried out by Hannes/Johannes; it was uploaded to the band's official Vevo account to YouTube on June 24, 2014.

=== Synopsis ===
A group of blind miners, are shown trying to mine for diamonds in a cleared area of a forest. They eventually strike diamonds, and an enchanted diamond emerges. It attracts every other diamond, and forms to create a wolf-like beast. The beast is shown with a greedy passion for diamonds. It creates birds that collect fish from the water, in the form of an assault rifle. Meanwhile, the miners are gathering in a city on an island, while a spiritual figure follows. The beast finally reaches the island, and is stationed on a building, and begins to act like a dictator, and orders the birds to collect the diamonds. The spirit reaches the city with flying creatures following it. The beast tries to fight it, casting a beam, but the creatures cast beams at it, creating a mass that outnumbers the beast, killing it. The enchanted diamond explodes, giving the miners vision, and they rejoice. The last shot shows the areas viewed empty, through a hand holding an enchanted diamond. The hand closes, and the film ends.

== Track listing ==
Digital download
No.	Title	Writer(s)	Producer(s)	Length
1.	"Pseudologia Fantastica"	Paul Epworth; Mark Foster	Epworth; Foster	5:31

== Personnel ==
Foster the People

- Cubbie Fink – bass, backing vocals
- Mark Foster – lead vocals, synthesizer, piano, electric guitar
- Mark Pontius – drums, backing vocals

Additional personnel

- Isom Innis – backing vocals
- Sean Cimino – guitar, backing vocals

== Charts ==
Chart (2014)	Peak position
France (SNEP)	118
US Hot Rock & Alternative Songs (Billboard)	31

== Release history ==
Country	Date	Format	Label
Australia	February 25, 2014	Digital download	Columbia
United States	February 25, 2014	Digital download	Columbia
Italy	July 25, 2014	Contemporary hit radio	Sony
