= Paradise State of Mind =

Studio album by Foster the People
- Released: August 16, 2024
- Recorded: 2022–2024
- Studio: EastWest, Hollywood, Los Angeles; The Church, London, England
- Genre: Indie pop; disco; synth-pop; psychedelic pop
- Length: 43:37
- Label: Atlantic
- Producer: Chrome Sparks; Paul Epworth; Mark Foster; Isom Innis

Foster the People chronology
In the Darkest of Nights, Let the Birds Sing (2020)	Paradise State of Mind (2024)

Singles from Paradise State of Mind
- 1. "Lost in Space" Released: May 31, 2024; 2. "Take Me Back" Released: June 28, 2024; 3. "Chasing Low Vibrations" Released: July 26, 2024

Paradise State of Mind is the fourth studio album by American indie pop band Foster the People, released on August 16, 2024, by Atlantic Records, their first under the label. It is the band's first studio album in seven years since the release of Sacred Hearts Club (2017), although they released an EP and a number of non-album singles between 2018 and 2021. The band initially planned on touring in 2021 in support of their EP In the Darkest of Nights, Let the Birds Sing (2020) however the COVID-19 pandemic prevented them, leading to a hiatus where band members worked on other material and eventually started the process of songwriting and recording this album. The album artwork is an oil painting by Matt Hansel.

The first single, disco-toned "Lost in Space", was released on May 31, 2024. The second single "Take Me Back" was released on June 28, 2024. The third single "Chasing Low Vibrations" was released on July 26, 2024. It is the band's first album not to feature their drummer Mark Pontius after his departure from the band in October 2021. It is also the band's final album to feature guitarist Sean Cimino as he departed from the band months before the album's release.

The album has received primarily positive reviews, with a Metacritic score of 75. Critics and fans praised the experimentation with popular music genres of the past and the quality of the production. It debuted at #8 on the Billboard Top Album sales, selling 7,000 copies during its first week, yet commercially underperforming, as it failed to chart high in other countries, something which has been attributed to the band's unofficial hiatus prior to its long-awaited release.

== Sound and influence ==
Paradise State of Mind is primarily influenced by the music of the late 1970s-1980's with elements of disco, funk, gospel, and jazz, with songwriting inspired by such cultural events as the COVID-19 pandemic, global conflicts like the Russian invasion of Ukraine and lead singer Mark Foster's struggles with alcoholism such as the song "Let Go". Some themes explored through the album's lyrics include technology, mortality, time, self-reflection and optimism. Foster has stated his fascination with the music of the 1970s decade contrasted with the political, social and cultural changes of that time, drawing a parallel between the 1970s and the 2020s. It is also more of an analog record with less use of digital sounds and instrumentation compared to their previous albums.

== Promotion ==
Following the 10th anniversary reissue of their debut album, the band's social media channels remained primarily inactive until May 2024 when the band started teasing new music. Various Instagram animated reels featuring clips of "Lost in Space" were released along with clips from the accompanying music video. When the single and video were released on May 31, 2024, more reels of the band producing the album began to be posted on Instagram, Facebook, YouTube and TikTok with the album title officially being announced. Additionally, in the weeks leading up to the full album release, Mark Foster and Isom Innis invited a select group of fans to listen to the album early in its entirety at venues in Los Angeles and New York City. A double music video for the songs "See You in the Afterlife" and "Feed Me" was released on May 1, 2025, despite the songs not being officially released as singles, though there is speculation that "See You in the Afterlife" was originally meant to be a single due to the track being promoted on a vinyl sticker.

== Critical reception ==
The album received primarily positive reviews from fans and critics, achieving a Metacritic score of 75. In comparison to the mixed reception of Supermodel (2014) and Sacred Hearts Club (2017), the album has been noted as being both refreshing and reminiscent of their previous music. Lana Williams from The Line of Best Fit gave it an 8/10 and stated "Paradise State of Mind is a refreshing modern offering from the LA-duo, their numbers may have dwindled by half, but their sound is bigger than ever." Matt Collar of All Music.com stated "Foster the People have made an end-of-summer album full of cathartic grooves" with him praising the mix of classic disco, funk and psychedelia on the album. Chad Liffmann of Spinning Platters noted "The album is not without its lyrical meditations on sadness and emotionally dark places, but overall, it’s a joyful blend of varied instrumentation, dance-floor beats, and catchy hooks. It’s all about balance – in life as in music." Some reviews were more mixed with The Cut stating "Undeniably well-crafted as the hooks are, over a whole album they sound hollow and forced." Almanac Music described the LP as "a record as superficial and soulless as a red carpet photoshoot"; further suggesting Mark Foster "has confused abrasive self-confidence with artistry".

== Track listing ==
Paradise State of Mind track listing
No.	Title	Writer(s)	Producer(s)	Length
1.	"See You in the Afterlife"	Mark Foster; Isom Innis; Riley McIntyre	Foster	3:09
2.	"Lost in Space"	Foster; Innis	Foster; Innis^{[c]}	4:19
3.	"Take Me Back"	Foster; Innis	Foster; Innis	2:32
4.	"Let Go"	Foster; Sarah Aarons; Paul Epworth	Foster	4:34
5.	"Feed Me"	Foster; Innis	Foster; Innis; Sean Cimino^{[a]}	3:40
6.	"Paradise State of Mind"	Foster; Epworth; Jack Peñate	Epworth; Foster^{[c]}	4:48
7.	"Glitchzig"	Foster	Foster	5:28
8.	"The Holy Shangri-La"	Foster; Epworth; McIntyre; Asa Taccone	Epworth; Foster^{[c]}	4:13
9.	"Sometimes I Wanna Be Bad"	Foster	Foster	3:03
10.	"Chasing Low Vibrations"	Foster; Innis; Jeremy Malvin	Foster; Chrome Sparks	3:24
11.	"A Diamond to Be Born"	Foster; Innis	Innis; Foster^{[c]}	4:25
Total length:				43:37

Paradise State of Mind Japanese edition
No.	Title	Length
12.	"Rabies Shmabies"	4:20
Total length:		47:57

Note

- ^{^[c]} signifies a co-producer
- ^{^[a]} signifies an additional producer

== Personnel ==
Foster the People

- Mark Foster – lead vocals (all tracks), synthesizer (tracks 1–10); guitar, piano (1–9); bass (1–3, 6–10), drums (2, 4), engineering (2), percussion (3, 7)
- Isom Innis – synthesizer (tracks 1, 3, 5, 11), engineering (2, 11), drums (3, 7, 10, 11), programming (5, 10), piano (11)
- Sean Cimino – guitar (tracks 1, 5, 7, 9, 10), synthesizer (5, 7, 10, 11), programming (5), slide guitar (9)

Additional musicians

- Paul Jacob Cartwright – concert master (tracks 1–5, 8, 11)
- Vanessa Freebairn-Smith – cello (tracks 1–5, 8, 11)
- Alyssa Park – violin (tracks 1–5, 8, 11)
- Andrew Duckles – violin (tracks 1–5, 8, 11)
- Ina Veli – violin (tracks 1–5, 8, 11)
- Kerenza Peacock – violin (tracks 1–5, 8, 11)
- Luanne Homzy – violin (tracks 1–5, 8, 11)
- Paul Jacob Cartwright – violin (tracks 1–5, 8, 11)
- Zach Dellinger – violin (tracks 1–5, 8, 11)
- Riley MacIntyre – programming (tracks 1, 8)
- Lily Kershaw – backing vocals (tracks 2, 4, 9)
- Jherek Bischoff – double bass (tracks 4, 5, 11)
- Jacob Scesney – Western concert flute (tracks 5, 9); baritone vocals, bass saxophone, tenor vocals (9)
- Paul Epworth – synthesizer (tracks 6, 8); backing vocals, drums (6)
- Jack Peñate – backing vocals, guitar, programming (track 6)
- Nikolaj Torp Larsen – organ, piano, synthesizer (track 6)
- Stewart Cole – trumpet (tracks 7, 9); chant vocals, synthesizer (7); baritone horn, flugelhorn (9)
- Aaron Redfield – drums (track 9)
- Jeremy Malvin – bass, programming, synthesizer (track 10)

Technical

- Mike Bozzi – mastering
- Rich Costey – mixing
- Chaz Sexton – engineering (tracks 1–5, 7–11)
- Patrick Ford – engineering (tracks 1–5, 7–11)
- Riley MacIntyre – engineering (tracks 1, 4, 6, 8)
- Luke Pickering – engineering (tracks 6, 8)
- Jherek Bischoff – string arrangement (tracks 1–5, 8, 11)
- Mayumi Heider – engineering assistance (tracks 1–5, 8, 11)

== Charts ==
Chart performance for Paradise State of Mind
Chart (2024)	Peak position
Croatian International Albums (HDU)	40
French Physical Albums (SNEP)	163
Hungarian Albums (MAHASZ)	25
Scottish Albums (OCC)	52
UK Album Downloads (OCC)	34
US Billboard 200	170
US Top Rock & Alternative Albums (Billboard)	43
