= In the Darkest of Nights, Let the Birds Sing =

2020 EP by Foster the People

EP by Foster the People
- Released: December 11, 2020
- Recorded: 2020
- Genre: Indie rock; psychedelic pop
- Length: 24:44
- Producer: Mark Foster; Isom Innis

Foster the People chronology
Sacred Hearts Club (2017)	In the Darkest of Nights, Let the Birds Sing (2020)	Paradise State of Mind (2024)

Singles from In the Darkest of Nights, Let the Birds Sing
- 1. "Lamb's Wool" Released: May 22, 2020; 2. "The Things We Do" Released: July 10, 2020; 3. "Under the Moon" Released: November 12, 2020

In the Darkest of Nights, Let the Birds Sing is the fourth extended play (EP) by American indie rock band Foster the People, and their first to consist entirely of non-album material. The band released it independently on December 11, 2020. It was recorded remotely during the COVID-19 lockdowns of 2020, and was their first release following their departure from Columbia Records.

In the Darkest of Nights, Let the Birds Sing received mixed reviews from critics. Musically, it is an indie rock EP, with psychedelic influences and synthesized instrumentation. Its lyrics revolve around the concept of love, and many of its songs were written about the relationship between lead singer Mark Foster and his wife, Julia Garner. It was promoted with three singles; "Lamb's Wool", "The Things We Do" and "Under the Moon". It is the band's last release to feature drummer Mark Pontius, who left the band in 2021.

== Background and development ==
Following the release of their third studio album, Sacred Hearts Club (2017), and several singles, Foster the People split from their record label, Columbia Records. Of the split, frontman Mark Foster said that he had become complacent knowing he had "other people with experience that would come up with ideas for us", but noticed that the "identity of the band was starting to get diluted because we were letting other things [...] influence it". He said that the band's ideas would no longer be affected by outside influences.

In the Darkest of Nights, Let the Birds Sing was recorded throughout 2020, during the COVID-19 pandemic. The band recorded remotely, setting up a Dropbox server where they shared files and revised songs until they were ready for mixing. Foster's experience of the pandemic was mixed, as he spent time with his wife but felt "a gambit [of emotions]; fear, uncertainty, depression, anxiety, anger", and the songs on the EP were made as a response to that time. In March of that year, the band released an essay about unity during the pandemic on their website. The essay, penned by Foster, accompanied the release of a non-album single, "It's Ok to Be Human".

== Music and lyrics ==
=== Music ===
In the Darkest of Nights, Let the Birds Sing consists of six indie rock tracks. According to Palatinate's Kat Pittalis, the songs on the EP are more experimental and more influenced by psychedelic pop than those on the band's previous releases. Vincent Tran of The Daily Californian noted that on the EP, "the group attempts to weld together an even wider range of influences" than their other works, and Foster called its sound "a reflection of everything Foster the People has touched on sonically from the beginning".

The opening track, "Walk with a Big Stick", is an upbeat track with a walking bassline, interspersed with vocal interludes that several critics compared to the works of the Beach Boys. "Cadillac" is led by a prominent bassline and includes sparse guitar chords, handclaps and a guitar solo. "Lamb's Wool" is an alternative dance-pop song influenced by psychedelic music. A piano-led ballad, keyboardist Isom Innis wrote the music of "Lamb's Wool" to honor his grandmother, a pianist who taught him how to play, following her death. "The Things We Do" is an electronic pop song, driven by synthesized instrumentation and Auto-Tuned vocals. "Under the Moon", which is influenced by trip hop, features an uncharacteristically low vocal performance from Foster. The song builds from a minimalistic opening to incorporate strings and synthesizers. The final track, "Your Heart is My Home", features wind and string instrumentation.

=== Lyrics ===
"Lamb's Wool"
A sample of "Lamb's Wool", the EP's lead single. The lyrics were inspired by Foster's uncle's cancer diagnosis.

The lyrics of In the Darkest of Nights, Let the Birds Sing are themed around the concept of love and relationships. Foster stated that the songs on the EP "are [all] about a different facet of love", and several of its songs were written about the relationship between him and his wife, the actress Julia Garner. He aimed for authenticity during the writing process, which began two years prior to the EP's release.

"Walk with a Big Stick" is written about devotion and love. Its lyrics are written from the perspective of a confident protagonist, before switching to a more vulnerable and affectionate tone in the chorus. The inspiration for "Cadillac" appeared early in the writing process, when Foster envisioned himself driving the titular car "into the great unknown" with Garner. The lyrics for "Lamb's Wool" were written after his uncle was diagnosed with terminal liver cancer. He described the song's lyrics as "a conversation between me, my uncle, and God", and was able to play the finished song for his uncle before he died. In contrast, "The Things We Do" was written "about how everybody's a weirdo when nobody's looking", and was approached with less grace than "Lamb's Wool". It is followed by "Under the Moon", which Foster said was about being separated from a loved one and being able to "look up at the moon at night and know that you guys are both sharing that moment". The lyrics of the final track, "Your Heart is My Home", are simple and romantic.

== Title and packaging ==
It's important that birds sing right now, it's important that comedians get on stage and make people laugh. It's important that people make movies. It's important that people share their art on Instagram, things that are there that remind us that the world is beautiful.

— Mark Foster (2020)

The title of In the Darkest of Nights, Let the Birds Sing was chosen in reference to the importance of "things that are there that remind us that the world is beautiful" during 2020, according to Foster. The cover artwork is a photograph taken by Nikoli Partiyeli and illustrated by Young & Sick, who also made the artwork for Torches (2011) and Supermodel (2014).

The vinyl release of In the Darkest of Nights, Let the Birds Sing features a slightly shuffled track listing. The positions of "Cadillac" and "Walk with a Big Stick" are switched, and "Imagination", a previously released single, appears as a bonus track. When asked about the inclusion of "Imagination", Foster said that he felt the song "deserved to be pressed to vinyl".

== Release ==
The band first teased new music on their Instagram account in April 2020, prior to the release of lead single "Lamb's Wool" on May 22. It peaked at number 36 on the Hot Rock & Alternative Songs charts. "The Things We Do" was released as the second single on July 10 and peaked at number 25 on the Alternative Digital Song Sales charts. Its proceeds were split evenly between four charities; Black Lives Matter International, The Bail Project, Rebuild Foundation and the Underground Museum. On August 4, the band appeared on Late Night with Seth Meyers, performing "Lamb's Wool" from their homes.

On November 12, the band officially announced In the Darkest of Nights, Let the Birds Sing, accompanied by the release of the third single, "Under the Moon". The EP was released the following month, on December 11, 2020. It was given a limited-edition release on vinyl, pressed by Third Man Pressing. Visualizers were released for the EP's tracks, directed by the band members and Nikoli Partiyeli. An animated music video for "Lamb's Wool", directed by Thomas Jarrett, came out on April 1, 2021. The band did not tour for the release, but performed songs from it at their three-night run of shows at the Wiltern Theatre in December 2021. In the Darkest of Nights, Let the Birds Sing was the band's final release to feature drummer Mark Pontius, who left the band in 2021.

== Track listings ==
In the Darkest of Nights, Let the Birds Sing digital track listing
No.	Title	Writer(s)	Length
1.	"Walk with a Big Stick"	Mark Foster; Isom Innis; Sean Cimino	3:04
2.	"Cadillac"	Foster	3:50
3.	"Lamb's Wool"	Foster; Innis	4:36
4.	"The Things We Do"	Foster	4:12
5.	"Under the Moon"	Foster; Innis; Mark Pontius	4:39
6.	"Your Heart is My Home"	Foster; Innis	4:21
Total length:			24:44

Vinyl track listing

Side 1
No.	Title	Writer(s)	Length
1.	"Cadillac"	Foster	3:50
2.	"Walk with a Big Stick"	Foster; Innis; Cimino	3:04
3.	"Lamb's Wool"	Foster; Innis	4:36
4.	"The Things We Do"	Foster	4:12
Total length:			15:42

Side 2
No.	Title	Writer(s)	Length
1.	"Under the Moon"	Foster; Innis; Pontius	4:39
2.	"Your Heart is My Home"	Foster; Innis	4:21
3.	"Imagination" (bonus track)	Foster; Sarah Aarons; Oliver Goldstein; Josh Abraham; Austin Tirado	4:16
Total length:			13:16

== Personnel ==
Credits are adapted from the EP's liner notes.

Tracks 1–6

- Mark Foster – production, engineering
- Isom Innis – production and engineering
- Rich Costey – mixing
- Howie Weinberg – mastering

"Imagination"

- Mark Foster – production
- Josh Abraham – production
- Oligee – production
- Lars Stalfors – mixing
- Howie Weinberg – mastering

Art design

- Nikoli Partiyeli – photography, vinyl packaging design
- Young & Sick – additional design
