= Are You What You Want to Be? =

Single by Foster the People

from the album Supermodel
- Released: September 8, 2014
- Recorded: 2013
- Genre: Alternative rock; alternative dance
- Length: 4:30
- Label: Columbia
- Songwriters: Greg Kurstin; Mark Foster
- Producers: Greg Kurstin; Mark Foster; Paul Epworth

Foster the People singles chronology
"Best Friend" (2014)	"Are You What You Want to Be?" (2014)	"Doing It for the Money" (2017)

"Are You What You Want to Be?" is a song by American indie pop band Foster the People. It serves as the opening track on their second studio album, Supermodel, and was released as the album's fourth single on September 8, 2014.

== Release ==
An audio stream of "Are You What You Want to Be?" was uploaded by the band's Vevo account to YouTube on August 5, 2014 accompanied by its single cover. The song impacted contemporary hit radio in the United Kingdom on September 8, 2014 and modern rock radio in the United States on September 9, 2014 as the album's fourth single. The song is also used on EA Sports game, FIFA 15.

== Personnel ==
Foster the People

- Cubbie Fink – bass
- Mark Foster – lead vocals, keyboards
- Mark Pontius – drums
- Sean Cimino – guitar
- Isom Innis – synthesizer

== Charts ==
Chart (2014)	Peak position
US Hot Rock & Alternative Songs (Billboard)	42

== Release history ==
Country	Date	Format	Label
United Kingdom	September 8, 2014	Contemporary hit radio	Columbia
United States	September 9, 2014	Modern rock radio	Columbia
