= Coming of Age (song) =

Single by Foster the People

from the album Supermodel
- Released: January 14, 2014
- Recorded: 2013
- Genre: Indie pop; alternative rock; psychedelic rock
- Length: 4:40
- Label: Columbia
- Songwriters: Mark Foster; Mark Pontius; Isom Innis; Jacob Fink; Sean Cimino; Paul Epworth
- Producers: Paul Epworth; Mark Foster

Foster the People singles chronology
"Houdini" (2012)	"Coming of Age" (2014)	"Pseudologia Fantastica" (2014)

"Coming of Age" is a song by American indie pop band Foster the People from their second studio album, Supermodel. It was written by Mark Foster, Mark Pontius and Cubbie Fink of the band, along with British music producer Paul Epworth and close collaborators Sean Cimino and Isom Innis. The song was released as the lead single from Supermodel in the United States on January 14, 2014, and in the United Kingdom on March 16, 2014.

== Composition ==
"Coming of Age" was written with Foster the People frontman Mark Foster's social life as a background to the song. Foster stated to XFM London:

"Lyrically it is almost a confession. It is about a moment of clarity, having a moment of clarity and I think for me this year, being home, was that quiet after the storm of touring for two years and my life drastically changing. It was kind of the first breath I had to really look around and see that there were some things that happened during that period with my friends and with my loved ones, with the people that are close to me and with myself as well. It is the first time that I got a clear look on those things and that's kind of what the song is about. It's about growing up."

== Recording ==
The song was the last to be written and recorded during the recording sessions for Supermodel. The song was conceived during the recording of the album, and had not been written beforehand. Mark Foster described it as a song that "came out of nowhere", saying, "It's kind of funny, it's the last song we wrote and recorded and it is the first song everybody is going to hear".

== Music video ==
"Coming of Age" premiered on YouTube on January 13, 2014, with the song being accompanied by time-lapse footage depicting the creation of a mural of the Supermodel cover. Directed by Vern Moen and Zachary Rockwood, the video was filmed in South Los Angeles Street and showcases the LA Freewalls project.

The official music video, directed by BRTHR, followed on February 6, 2014. The video inspired by 1980s teen films, depicts the stories of various struggling Californian children, intercut with footage of the band playing on a stage. Scenes include a dejected high school student wearing a mascot suit and being bullied by jocks, a teenager running away from cops, a young boxer struggling in the ring, and angst-ridden teenagers confronting a group of popular students. Describing the video, Foster stated: "The emotional arcs of the characters were pretty empowering." He singled out the boxer subplot as his favorite, as it reminded him of the 1976 film Rocky.

== Reception ==
The song was well received by critics. Garrett Kamps of Spin described it as "a breezy pop song with innocuous lyrics [...] that's not so ostentatious as to call attention to itself, a sweet spot these guys used to find more often".

== Track listing ==
Digital download
No.	Title	Writer(s)	Producer(s)	Length
1.	"Coming of Age"	Mark Foster; Isom Innis; Jacob Fink; Sean Cimino; Paul Epworth	Epworth; Foster	4:40

== Personnel ==
Foster the People

- Cubbie Fink – bass
- Mark Foster – lead vocals, guitar, synthesizer, harpsichord, piano
- Mark Pontius – drums

Additional personnel

- Isom Innis – synthesizer, programming
- Sean Cimino – rhythm acoustic guitar, additional effects
- Paul Epworth – programming, modular synth

== Charts ==
=== Weekly charts ===
Chart (2014)	Peak position
Canada Hot 100 (Billboard)	69
Canada Rock (Billboard)	10
Czech Republic Airplay (ČNS IFPI)	38
Finland Airplay (Radiosoittolista)	75
Japan Hot 100 (Billboard)	44
Slovakia Airplay (ČNS IFPI)	58
Switzerland Airplay (Schweizer Hitparade)	54
UK Singles (Official Charts Company)	158
US Bubbling Under Hot 100 (Billboard)	3
US Hot Rock & Alternative Songs (Billboard)	14
US Adult Alternative Airplay (Billboard)	2
US Alternative Airplay (Billboard)	4
US Rock & Alternative Airplay (Billboard)	7

=== Year-end charts ===
Chart (2014)	Peak position
US Hot Rock Songs (Billboard)	41
US Adult Alternative Songs (Billboard)	21
US Alternative Songs (Billboard)	24
US Rock Airplay (Billboard)	26

== Certifications ==
Region	Certification	Certified units/sales
United States (RIAA)	Gold	500,000^{‡}
^{‡} Sales+streaming figures based on certification alone.

== Release history ==
Country	Date	Format	Label
Australia	January 14, 2014	Digital download	Columbia
Canada	January 14, 2014	Digital download	Columbia
France	January 14, 2014	Digital download	Columbia
New Zealand	January 14, 2014	Digital download	Columbia
United States	January 14, 2014	Digital download	Columbia
United States	January 14, 2014	Modern rock radio	Columbia
Italy	January 17, 2014	Contemporary hit radio	Columbia
United States	January 20, 2014	Adult album alternative radio	Columbia
United Kingdom	March 16, 2014	Digital download	Columbia
