= Ride or Die (The Knocks song) =

2018 single by The Knocks featuring Foster The People

Single by The Knocks featuring Foster the People

from the album New York Narcotic
- Released: March 9, 2018
- Genre: Electronic; indie rock
- Length: 4:02
- Label: Big Beat; Neon Gold
- Songwriters: Styalz Fuego; Benjamin Ruttner; Mark Foster
- Producer: The Knocks

The Knocks singles chronology
"House Party" (2017)	"Ride or Die" (2018)	"Shades" (2018)

Foster the People singles chronology
"Pay the Man (Remix)" (2017)	"Ride or Die" (2018)	"Worst Nites" (2018)

Music video
- "Ride or Die" on YouTube

"Ride or Die" is a song by American EDM duo The Knocks featuring American indie pop band Foster the People, it was released on March 9, 2018 from The Knocks' second studio album New York Narcotic. The song was written by Styalz Fuego, Benjamin Ruttner and Mark Foster, the lead singer of Foster the People, and produced by The Knocks.

== Music video ==
The music video was released on June 18, 2018, and directed by Kenny Laubbacher. It showcases the duo "chasing their Hollywood dreams". The Knocks explained to Billboard: "Writing the song, we wanted to create a warm nostalgic sound that centered around the idea of friendship and celebration. When our friend Kenny Laubbacher approached us with the idea of shooting a music video based on classic movie duos...our love for nostalgic movies and referencing classic imagery made it a no brainer."

== Track listing ==
Digital download
No.	Title	Length
1.	"Ride or Die"	4:02

Digital download – remixes
No.	Title	Length
1.	"Ride or Die" (Purple Disco Machine remix)	6:24
2.	"Ride or Die" (The Knocks VIP mix)	5:09

Digital download – Sir Sly remix
No.	Title	Length
1.	"Ride or Die" (Sir Sly remix)	3:31

Digital download – Vicetone remix
No.	Title	Length
1.	"Ride or Die" (Vicetone remix)	3:15

Digital download – Modern Machines remix
No.	Title	Length
1.	"Ride or Die" (Modern Machines remix)	3:37

== Charts ==
=== Weekly charts ===
Weekly chart performance for "Ride or Die"
Chart (2018)	Peak position
US Hot Dance/Electronic Songs (Billboard)	20
US Rock & Alternative Airplay (Billboard)	27

=== Year-end charts ===
Year-end chart performance for "Ride or Die"
Chart (2018)	Position
US Hot Dance/Electronic Songs (Billboard)	61

== Certifications ==
Certifications for "Ride or Die"
Region	Certification	Certified units/sales
United States (RIAA)	Gold	500,000^{‡}
^{‡} Sales+streaming figures based on certification alone.
