= Foster the People =

American indie pop band

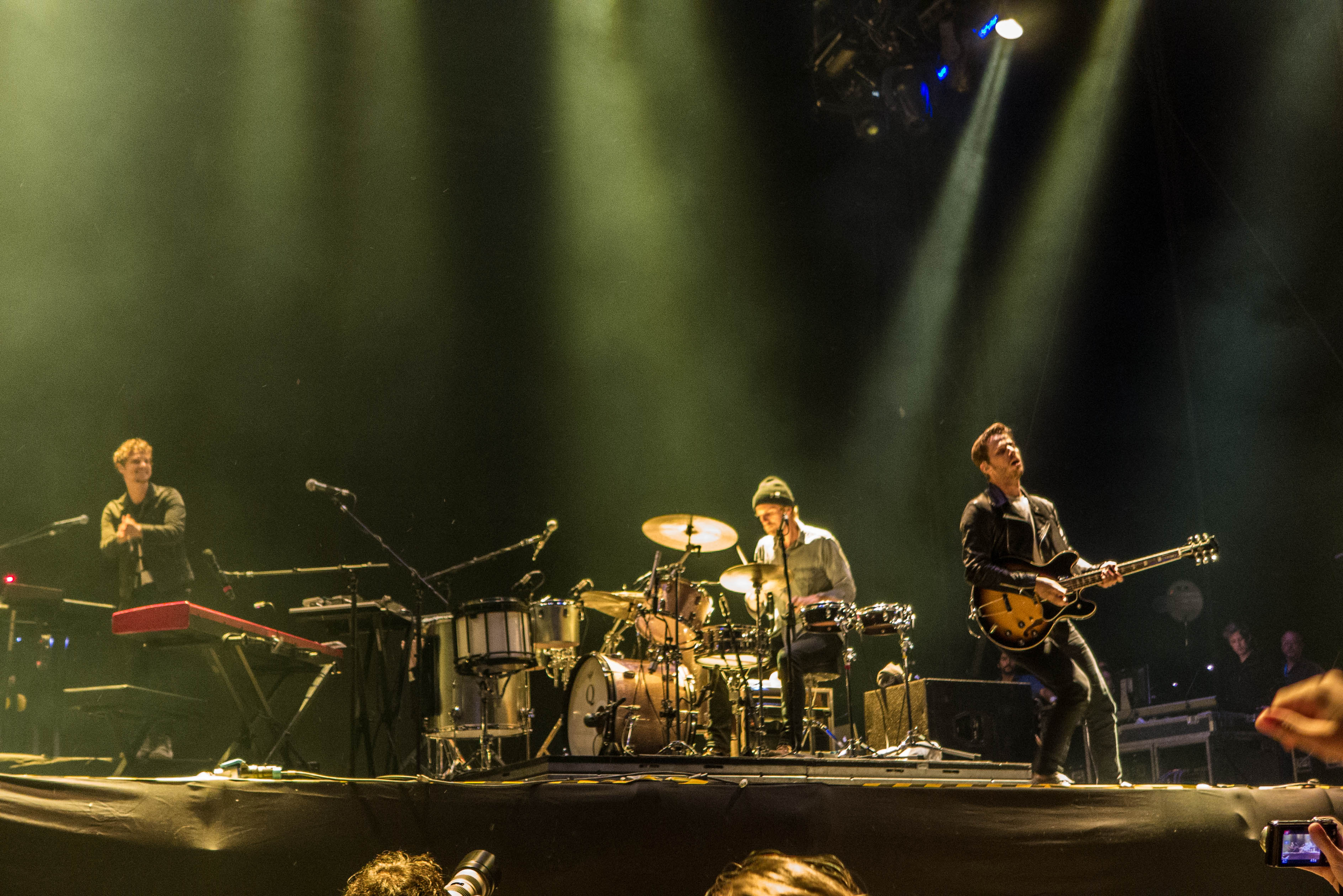
- Foster the People performing at Bilbao BBK Live in 2014

Background information
- Also known as: Foster & the People (2009)
- Origin: Los Angeles, California, U.S.
- Genres: Indie pop; synth-pop; dance-pop; alternative rock; indie rock; neo-psychedelia
- Years active: 2009–present
- Labels: Startime; Columbia; Foster the People; Atlantic
- Spinoffs: Delivery; Smims & Belle; Mr. Gabriel; Suitnop
- Spinoff of: Malbec
- Members: Mark Foster; Isom Innis
- Past members: Mark Pontius; Sean Cimino; Jacob "Cubbie" Fink
- Website: fosterthepeople.com

Foster the People is an American indie pop band formed in Los Angeles, California, in 2009. Its members include founder and frontman Mark Foster and keyboardist Isom Innis.

Foster founded the band in 2009 after spending several years in Los Angeles as a struggling musician and working as a commercial jingle writer. After Foster's song "Pumped Up Kicks" became a viral success in 2010, the group received a record deal from Startime International and gained a fanbase through small club shows and appearances at music festivals. After releasing their debut album, Torches, in May 2011, "Pumped Up Kicks" became a crossover hit on commercial radio in mid-2011 and eventually reached number three on the Billboard Hot 100. The record also featured the singles "Helena Beat" and "Houdini". The group received three Grammy Award nominations for Torches and "Pumped Up Kicks".

After touring for two years in support of Torches, Foster the People released their second album, Supermodel, in March 2014. It was preceded by the lead single "Coming of Age". In July 2017, the band released their third studio album, Sacred Hearts Club, with the addition of Isom Innis and Sean Cimino, both former touring members, to the official lineup. From this album, their song "Sit Next to Me" peaked at number 42 on the Billboard Hot 100 and was certified quadruple platinum by the RIAA. Between 2018 and 2021, the band released a number of singles, one EP and one album reissue. A new single titled "Lost in Space" was released on May 31, 2024. Their fourth album, Paradise State of Mind, was released on August 16, 2024, to mostly positive reviews.

== History ==
=== 2008–2009: Background and formation ===
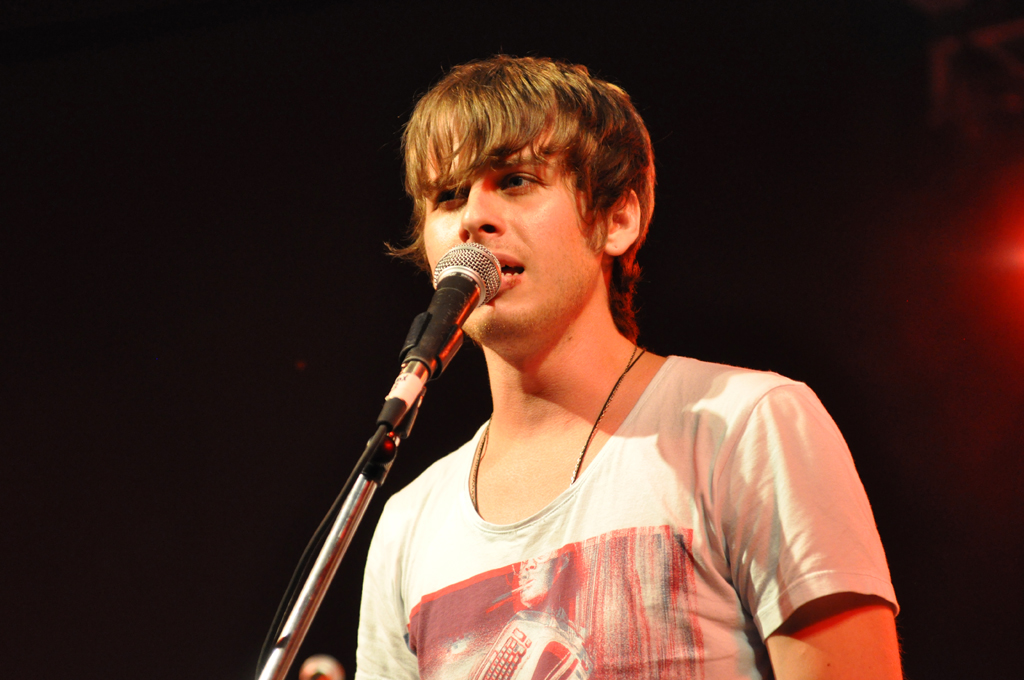
Mark Foster in 2011

Mark Foster graduated from Nordonia High School in the Cleveland-Akron suburb of Macedonia, Ohio, in 2002. With his father's encouragement, Foster moved in with his uncle in Sylmar, Los Angeles, California to pursue a career in music. Foster worked various jobs and at night, he attended parties in Hollywood to expand his social network. He said, "I felt like an 18-year-old Hunter S. Thompson. I was just diving into this Hollywood Hills subculture and taking it all in. I wasn't shy about taking my guitar out at a party. I wanted to be the center of attention." Foster struggled with drug addiction during his initial years in Los Angeles, saying, "It got pretty dark. My friends thought I was going to die. I was blind to it. When I was 19 years old, it got to a point where I said, 'Enough is enough' ... I saw time was just passing me by. I wasn't being productive."

Foster played in several bands, including one with which he auditioned for a record deal in New York. After turning 22, he says he was contacted by Aftermath Entertainment about showcasing his musical talents, but the opportunity ultimately fell through. Foster's first professional experience as a music artist was as lead vocalist on the 2006 song "Breakdown" by the Toques. For the next few years, Foster waited tables at a cafe while dealing with writer's block, but he remained in Los Angeles after landing a job as a commercial jingle writer for Mophonics in 2008. He said of the profession, "I definitely learned from the commercial standpoint what works," and he credited it with reviving his confidence in performing. The music Foster wrote spanned a wide range of genres, but he had difficulty reconciling his eclectic compositions. He explained: "I'd write one song and it'd be a hip-hop song. I'd write another and it'd be heavily electronic. Another would be like a spiritual, and another would be classic piano song. I was constantly trying to pull those elements together. It took me six years to do it." He still wished to be part of a group; reflecting on a residency he did at a venue performing electronic music, he said, "It was just me and a laptop. Really, it was terrible. I knew I needed a band."

==== Band formation and first shows ====
Foster the People was born out of a nascent relationship with drummer Mark Pontius, a film school student who left his group Malbec to found a band with Foster in fall 2009. At that time, Foster had released and was playing shows supporting a solo album; Pontius was impressed by the number and diversity of songs that Foster had written to that point, saying, "Some were on the guitar, and some were on the computer. But it was this really awesome singer-songwriter thing with a tricked-out beat, and I felt we could go wherever we wanted with this."

Foster the People (as "Foster & The People") played their first show on October 7, 2009, at the Dakota Live Music Lounge; they played many of the songs that Foster had written for his solo record. The first iteration of the band was Foster, Pontius, and producer Zach "Reazon" Heiligman. The group soon added a bassist, Foster's long-time friend Cubbie Fink, who had lost his job at a television production company during the recession. Early on, the band performed as a quartet with producer Reazon. Reazon performed live music programming and appeared in some of their early press photos. He broke off from the group in mid-2010 and is credited as a co-writer of the song "Miss You".

External image
- Poster for the band's first show together (October 7, 2009)

Mark Foster originally named the band Foster & the People, but people misheard it as "Foster the People". Eventually, he took to the nurturing image it evoked of "taking care" of people, so the name stuck.

=== 2010: Initial attention for "Pumped Up Kicks" and record deal ===
Not long after the group formed, Foster wrote and recorded a song at Mophonics called "Pumped Up Kicks", which eventually proved to be the band's breakthrough. After Foster posted the song on his website as a free download in early 2010, it drew considerable attention; Nylon magazine used the track in an online advertising campaign, and through various blogs, it went viral. The group, yet to be signed, garnered buzz with performances at the South by Southwest music festival in March 2010.

Foster was emailed by many people about "Pumped Up Kicks", and needing professional guidance, he contacted artist manager Brent Kredel at Monotone, Inc. in March, saying, "Everyone is calling me and emailing me—what do I do? Who are the good guys, who are the bad guys? Kredel recalled that "He went from the guy who couldn't get a hold of anyone to being the guy who had hundreds of emails in his inbox." Kredel and Brett Williams were subsequently hired to co-manage Foster the People, and they arranged meetings for the band with several record labels, including Warner Bros., Atlantic, Columbia, and Universal Republic. In May 2010, the band was signed to the Columbia imprint Startime International in a multi-album deal. The deal did not involve ancillary rights. Foster controls publishing of the songs in North America, while a separate 2010 deal with Sony/ATV Music Publishing controls publishing outside of North America.

After Foster the People signed their record deal and to avoid burnout, Startime allowed the group to pace themselves and not rush an album that would cash in on the popularity of the song. From July to September 2010, the group wrote new material that would appear on their debut album, and they chose Paul Epworth, Rich Costey, and Greg Kurstin to co-produce the record with Mark Foster.

=== 2010–2011: Initial tour and music licensing ===
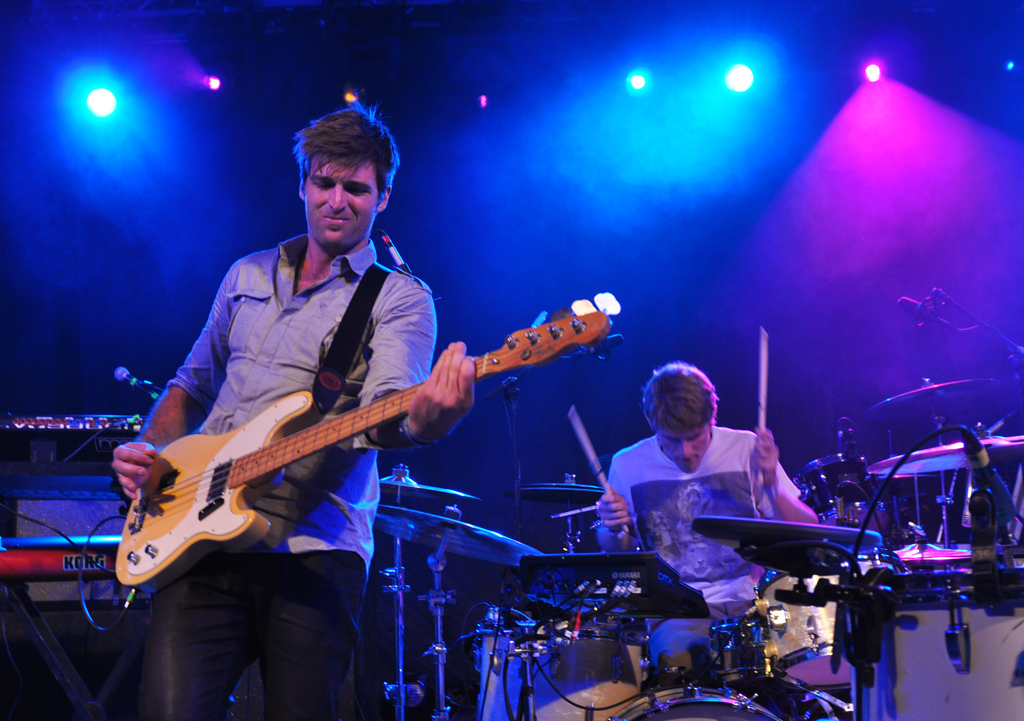
Cubbie Fink (front) and Mark Pontius at the 2011 South by Southwest festival

Without much experience as a live act, Foster the People were booked in October 2010 to play several club shows. At this point a trio, the band recruited musicians Sean Cimino and Isom Innis to tour with them. Booking the group proved difficult, as concert promoters were hesitant about an artist without previous touring experiences. Foster the People promoted these concerts by emailing fans who had downloaded "Pumped Up Kicks" from their website about the shows. In early 2011, the band was booked to perform at April's Coachella Valley Music and Arts Festival. Meanwhile, the group continued to grow its fanbase with a month-long residency of concerts in January at The Echo nightclub in Los Angeles. According to booking agent Tom Windish, by the group's third show at the venue, "there were hundreds of people trying to get in outside.... It was an obvious turning point that could be measured in numbers." The residency also drew the attention of music supervisors in attendance who would later help the group license their music.

Foster the People issued its first commercial non-single release in January 2011, a self-titled EP featuring "Pumped Up Kicks", "Houdini", and "Helena Beat" that was intended to hold fans over until their first studio album, Torches, was completed. Fans who purchased the EP through the iTunes Store were able to apply it toward the purchase of their full-length debut album. The EP drew the attention of organizers of March's South by Southwest festival, as well as executives looking to license music for upcoming season finales of television series. Columbia senior director of creative licensing Jonathan Palmer said, "The plan helped us a great deal to set up more opportunities rather than chasing the release date. So by the time we put the record out in May, we had already placed several songs." Half of Torches' songs were licensed—among them are: "Pumped Up Kicks" (Gossip Girl, The Vampire Diaries, Friends with Benefits, Entourage), "Houdini" (Gossip Girl); "Helena Beat" (The Vampire Diaries); "Don't Stop (Color on the Walls)" (Suits, Nissan Motors commercial); and "Call It What You Want" (FIFA 12). Palmer commented, "I haven't seen this kind of a range of song licenses from one album since we worked the first Ting Tings record three-and-a-half years ago. That was an album where we licensed nine or [all] 10 songs on the album. We're kind of in a similar situation [with Torches]."

=== 2011–2012: Breakthrough of "Pumped Up Kicks" and release of Torches ===
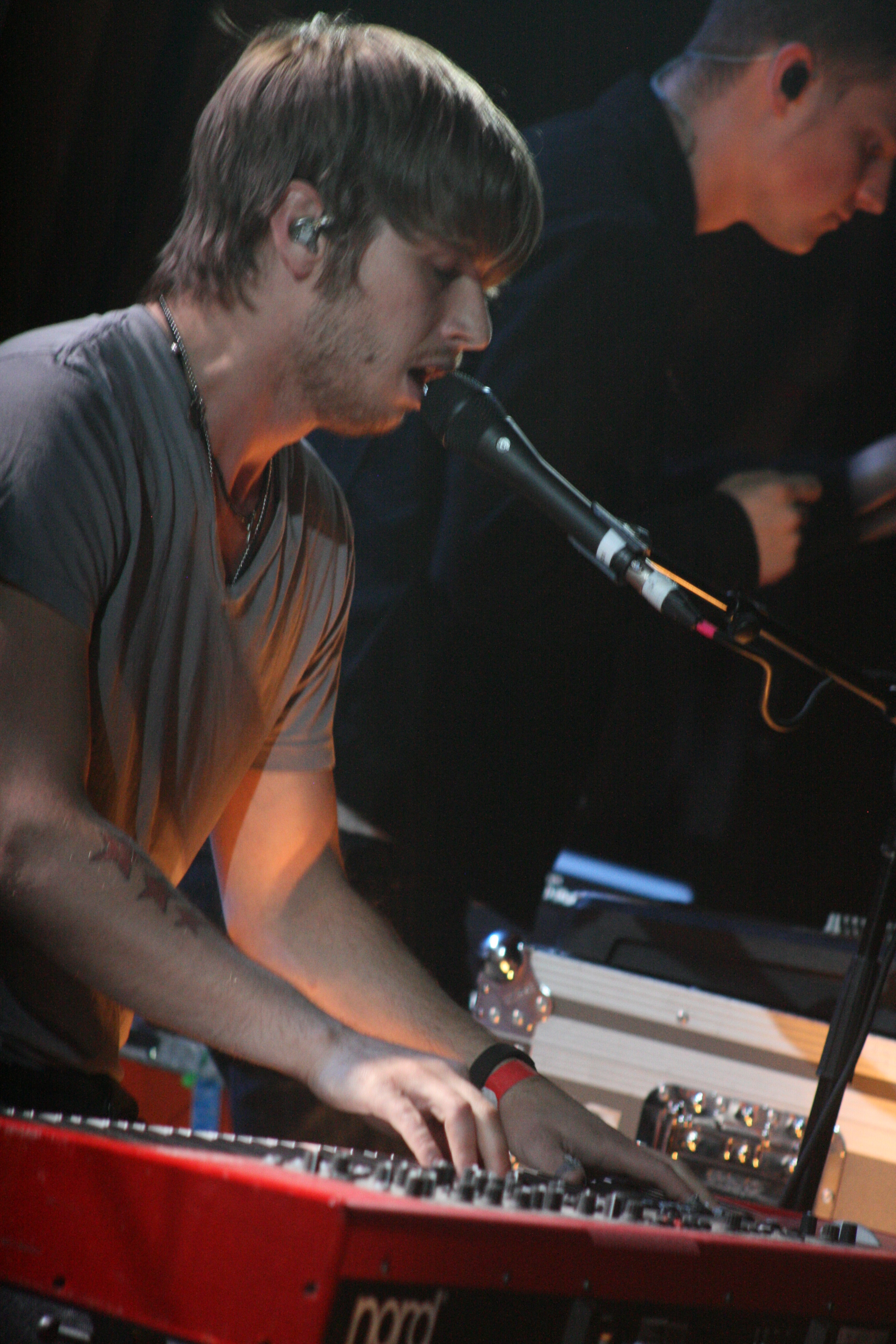
Foster the People performing in Colorado in June 2011

Beginning in July 2010, Sirius XM satellite radio's Alt Nation channel began playing "Pumped Up Kicks", followed by many alternative radio stations including Los Angeles terrestrial stations KROQ-FM and KYSR in January 2011. Mark Foster credits Sirius XM's airplay with the song's success, saying, "Alt Nation played our music before any other radio outlet in the country." On January 29, the song debuted on Billboard's Rock Songs chart and a week later, it debuted on the Alternative Songs chart. In May, the track debuted at number 96 on the Billboard Hot 100, and later that month, the group released their first full-length studio album, Torches. The success of "Pumped Up Kicks" and appearances on many late-night talk shows, including Last Call with Carson Daly, The Tonight Show with Jay Leno, Jimmy Kimmel Live!, and The Late Late Show with Craig Ferguson, helped the record debut at number eight on the Billboard 200. To promote the album, the group undertook a concert tour in the US and Europe for much of the second half of 2011, with most dates sold-out. By the time the group took a break in December, they had toured for 10 consecutive months.

"Pumped Up Kicks" proved to be a crossover hit, charting across several different radio formats; in addition to peaking at number one on the Alternative Songs chart in June and number three on the Rock Songs chart in July, the song broke into the top 40 of the Hot 100 in late July and appeared on the Adult Top 40 and Mainstream Top 40 charts. Columbia senior VP of promotion Lee Leipsner said, "It was one of the only alternative bands I remember in a while that you could actually dance to. And the fact that the record has a groove and rhythmic feel to it—not heavy guitar-based at all—gave us a wide opportunity to cross the record." He credits the song's crossover success and push into the top 40 to a June presentation of new music by Tom Poleman of Clear Channel. According to Leipsner, "After we showed our presentation, we had so many Clear Channel major-market programmers come up to us and say, 'The record I want to play besides Adele is Foster the People.'" "Pumped Up Kicks" peaked at number three on the Hot 100, spending eight consecutive weeks at the position. According to Nielsen Soundscan, over 321,000 copies of Torches have been sold in the US. "Pumped Up Kicks" finished 2011 as the sixth-best-selling digital song of the year, with 3.84 million copies sold.

The band was named in a lawsuit filed by Brandon Dorsky on May 24, 2011, alleging a breach of an oral contract between him and Foster, and that Dorsky had named the band. The case was settled for an undisclosed amount in July 2011.

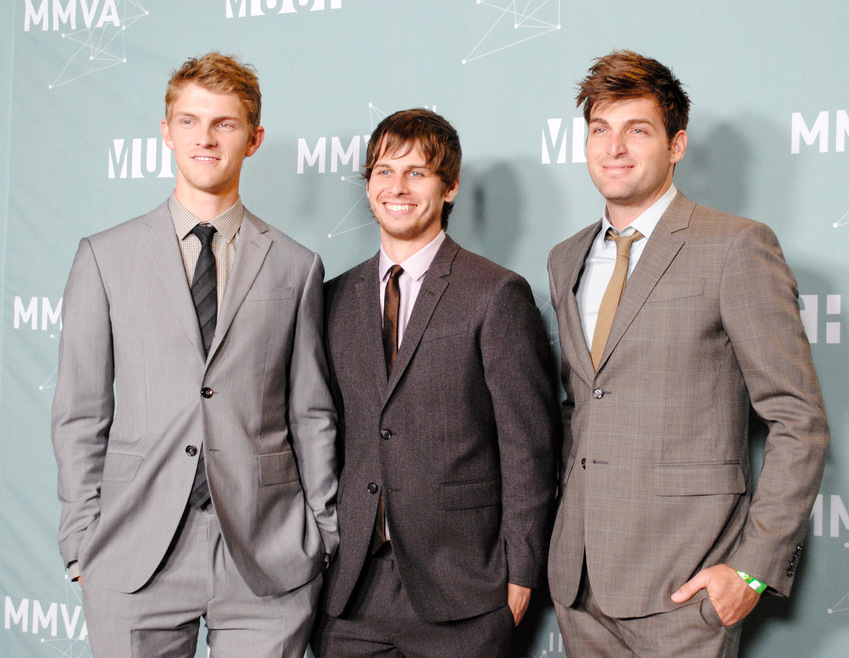
The original band lineup at the 2011 MuchMusic Video Awards, from left to right: Pontius, Foster, Fink

Foster the People appeared as the musical guest on the October 8, 2011, episode of Saturday Night Live, playing "Pumped Up Kicks" and "Houdini". Kenny G appeared as a guest performer on the latter song. At the end of the year, the group received two Grammy Award nominations: Best Pop Duo/Group Performance for "Pumped Up Kicks" and Best Alternative Music Album for Torches. At the awards ceremony, the band and Maroon 5 performed with The Beach Boys, one of Foster's childhood idols, in a medley of songs to celebrate the Beach Boys' 50th anniversary. Reflecting on Foster the People's sudden rise to success, Foster said, "For so many years, it was slow, playing in front of rooms full of 10 people and trying to get your friends to come... And then all of a sudden, it kind of took off. It's been a fast incline, so we've had to just work really hard, keep our heads down and just stay grounded. At the same time, we've had a lot of fun during the process." The group continued to tour throughout 2012. By the time the group's final US tour for Torches concluded in Los Angeles in July 2012, the group had played 295 shows in the previous 16 months.

=== 2012–2015: Supermodel and side project ===
Mark Foster and unofficial bandmate Isom Innis debuted their electronic music side project, Smims & Belle, at Hard Summer in August 2012. (Mister) Smims is Foster's DJ name, while (Southern) Belle is a moniker used by Innis. The duo's songs include "Ghetto Blastah" (with a music video directed by Michele Civetta), and "Beat Illuminati". Smims & Belle released an official remix of Lana Del Rey's "Blue Jeans", featuring a bespoke rap verse from Azealia Banks. The project's unreleased material includes remixes of tracks by Little Dragon, Florence + the Machine, and The Internet. Smims & Belle have been inactive since around 2015, coinciding with increased production responsibilities for Foster and Innis within Foster the People.

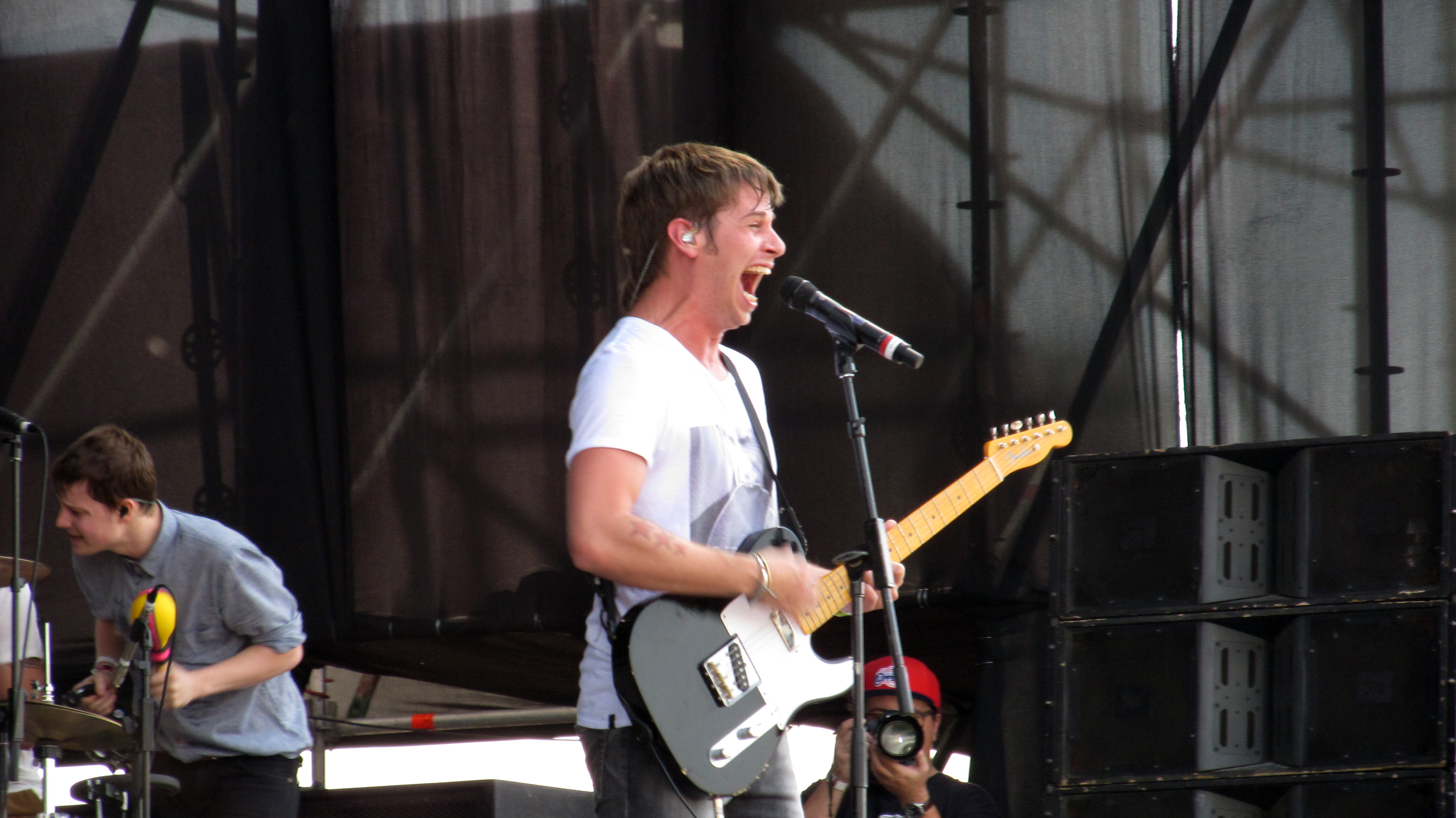
Foster the People performing at Lollapalooza Chile 2012

At the 2012 Brit Awards, Mark Foster said that Foster the People's second album would be released in 2013. In this year, during June, the band played at the Firefly Music Festival—as well as at a secret show at The Troubadour in Los Angeles, performing four new songs: "A Beginner's Guide To Destroying The Moon", "Pseudologia Fantastica", "Fire Escape", and "Coming of Age". Their second album was supposed to be released in November 2013, but Columbia decided to delay the release until January 2014 because they "didn't want them to be stumbling a hurtle too intense like that fourth-quarter competition. The record's so beautiful, we didn't want to take a gamble of potentially losing it in the rush." Foster told Rolling Stone, "This record still has the joy that our first album did, but it's been thrown into a pit and forced to dance among wolves." Foster said that the new album, which is "more organic and more human", would be released in early 2014. He hinted at a few new tracks, including "A Beginner's Guide to Destroying the Moon" and "Are You What You Wanna Be?", and stated that the first single should be on radio by January. Foster also told Rolling Stone that, "In the first record, I was looking at my vision for the project through a piece of opaque glass," and that the next album will be "a clearer picture of what I've had in my head when it comes to that vision."

The first single, "Coming of Age", was digitally released on January 14, 2014. The group's second studio album, Supermodel, was released via digital retailers on March 18, 2014. The album was followed by three more singles ("Best Friend", "Pseudologia Fantastica", and "Are You What You Want to Be?") and an extended play titled Spotify Sessions, which featured recorded versions of five songs off of their album.

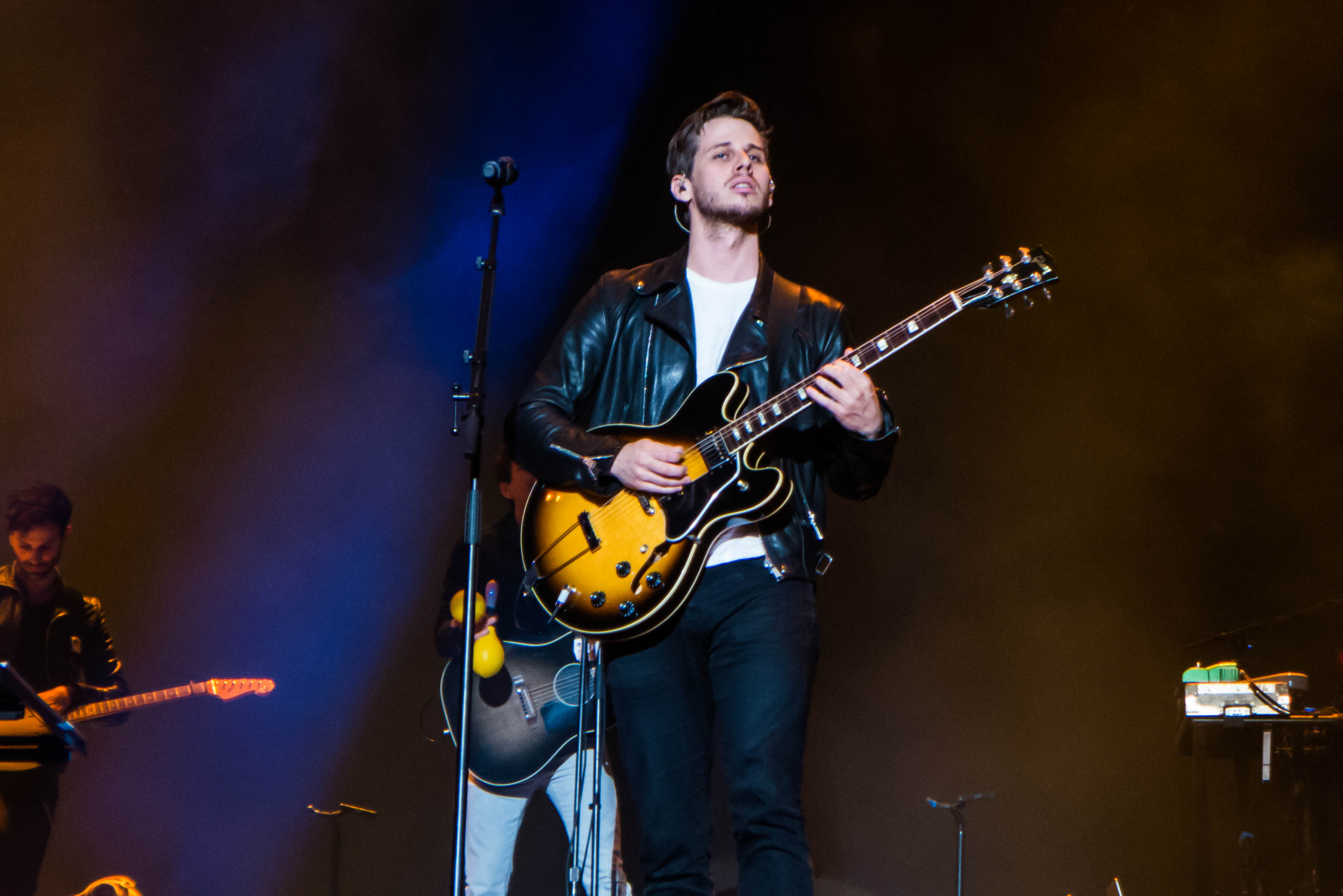
Foster the People performing at Bilbao BBK Live 2014

The band promoted "Coming of Age" by releasing a time-lapse music video of a seven-story mural of the Supermodel album cover being painted in downtown Los Angeles. Young & Sick, who also designed artwork for Torches, designed the mural. The painting took over ten days to complete. Although Young & Sick designed the mural, the actual painting was done by artists LeBA and Vyal under the guidance of Danial Lahoda, the owner and director of LALAarts. Foster explained that the mural wasn't intended to be a promotion for the album cover: "it's meant to be a piece of art for the city that happens to be an album cover." On January 23, 2014, the band played a free show in front of the mural. Following some legal controversy, the Supermodel mural was later painted over.

On March 24, 2015, during an interview in Paraguay, Foster the People announced that they were working on a third album. When describing their upcoming record, they said that "the first record was more, kind of, electro-pop, the second record was more of a rock record, and I think this one is going to be a little more hip hop."

On September 23, 2015, Foster the People announced that Fink would be leaving the band to pursue other opportunities. He stated, "I would like to express my extreme gratitude to our fans for your incredible love and support over the last four years. It was a true gift getting to perform for such loyal, passionate, and heartfelt people. I will miss playing and seeing all of you on the road. God bless you all." During an interview in 2018, Mark Foster admitted that Fink's departure had been less than amicable and that they have not since kept in touch. He said, "That was really hard. He's like family. We were friends before I started the band. I dated his sister for over a year and thought I was going to marry her. His parents were like my parents. It was really rough, and it wasn't until the past nine or so months where we felt able to move forward. [...] We have mutual friends, and I've heard he's doing well. But it was a bad breakup. It was a very high pressure situation for a number of years, but we did so much together. The first Coachella and the first time playing SNL was together. It's like we were in a foxhole together. We experienced things that nobody else will ever understand, and so it was really hard."

On April 24, 2015, the film Little Boy was released where Mark Foster co-produced the soundtrack for the film, with one track featuring Mark Pontius. On November 27, 2015, Foster the People released a stand-alone single: "Ruby." On December 8, 2015, they released another song called "The Unforeseeable Fate of Mr. Jones" through BitTorrent.

=== 2016–2018: Sacred Hearts Club ===
On October 9, 2016, Foster the People played at the Rocking the Daisies Music Festival, performing three new songs from their upcoming third studio album: "Lotus Eater", "Doing It For The Money", and "Pay the Man". On April 5, 2017, the band announced a world tour set to start in the summer. On April 27, 2017, the band released an EP, III, composed of three songs from their upcoming third studio album ("Pay the Man", "Doing It for the Money", and "SHC"). With this release, it was announced that their next full album would be released in June or July. This was also the group's first recording for which longtime touring/studio musicians Isom Innis (son of Restless Heart's Dave Innis) and Sean Cimino were attributed as official members. On June 13, the band announced the title and tracklisting of their third album, Sacred Hearts Club, that was released on July 21. The band ended the first month of 2018 by performing live in the Asian Pacific region. In March 2018, the band provided vocals on "Ride or Die" by The Knocks. Recently, the band has witnessed the resounding success of "Sit Next to Me", reaching over 200 million streams on Spotify and over 100 million plays on YouTube. Commenting on the song's slow-burning success, Mark Foster said, "It's kind of crazy to me that it's been on the radio for so long and it keeps continuing to grow. I guess it's a sleeper. [...] It's such a good feeling to write something that resonates and breaks the mold of the status quo. That's what happened with 'Pumped Up Kicks' and it's happening again with 'Sit Next to Me.' I love timeless pop."

They have also expressed their feelings on the recent spike in gun violence in the United States by showing their support for leaders of the March on Washington for Gun Control and other protests.

=== 2018–2021: In the Darkest of Nights, Let the Birds Sing EP, departure from Columbia Records, and departure of Mark Pontius ===
From November 6, 2018, the band would periodically release a new single every few months. These consisted of the four songs “Worst Nites”, “Style”, “Imagination”, and “Pick U Up”, all released between November 6, 2018, to September 6, 2019, though they were never included on an album. Each single would eventually be accompanied by a music video that was directed by Mark Foster, who had previously only directed one music video, "Pseudologia Fantastica" back in 2014. Young & Sick, who designed the cover art for Torches and Supermodel, designed all the cover art for each single as well. Imagination gained notable popularity compared to the rest of the singles, boasting over 110 million streams on Spotify and over 82 million views on YouTube.

Around this time, Foster the People departed from their longtime label, Columbia Records. Band member and drummer Mark Pontius revealed on the first episode of his podcast that the group had split from Columbia Records and were operating independently. In one article, frontman Mark Foster revealed that when it comes to contractual agreements, Columbia Records had agreed to let the band operate independently; Foster also stated that he feels lucky that he and the band never went through "horror stories of labels trying to force us to do a collaboration with somebody that was just a bad idea", and that Columbia Records as a whole was “really supportive.” Foster went on to say that when it comes to the modern-day music industry, "...the way that music's consumed has changed. There's a fluidity with streaming that's really powerful: to be able to go direct to a fan, to cut out the middle man, to not worry about having hard sales, making CDs, and getting them on the shelves in stores. None of that stuff really matters anymore." Foster finished on the note that the most important part of splitting from their label was the fact that they would be able to "retain all of our rights" to all music released going forward.

On March 24, 2020, the group released another single, "It's OK to Be Human". The song's single cover references the COVID-19 pandemic with its lyrics calling for encouragement. On May 18, 2020, the group announced that the sixth single "Lamb's Wool" would be released on May 22, 2020. A visualizer for the song was released the same day. On July 9, 2020, the group released a seventh single called "The Things We Do," which focused on police violence and racial inequality in the United States. All proceeds of the song were donated to four charities: 25% to Black Lives Matter International, 25% to The Bail Project, 25% to Rebuild Foundation, and 25% to The Underground Museum.

In October 2020, Isom Innis and Sean Cimino released an eponymous EP for their side project, Peel.

The group released an eighth single titled "Under the Moon" on November 13, 2020. This single was followed by the EP titled In the Darkest of Nights, Let the Birds Sing, released on December 11, 2020. The tracklist included the three pre-released singles: "Lamb's Wool", "The Things We Do", and "Under the Moon", along with the recently debuted "Cadillac", and two new songs: "Walk With a Big Stick" and "Your Heart Is My Home". Mark Foster said in a Live at My Den interview that most of the EP was written throughout quarantine, where the band passed around different projects until "the EP felt complete."

On May 23, 2021, Foster the People released a teaser to celebrate the tenth anniversary of their debut album, Torches, titled Torches X. The anniversary album, which features new and remixed tracks from the exclusive editions, released on November 12 the same year. To celebrate, they released the track "Broken Jaw" which was originally exclusive to the iTunes edition.

On October 13, 2021, Mark Pontius left the band to focus on raising his daughter, leaving Foster as the only founding member still in the band.

On October 29, 2021, the group teamed up with Canadian DJ Deadmau5 to release a new single titled "Hyperlandia", which had been in the works since 2016.

In November 2021, the band performed Torches X concerts at the Wiltern, which were live-streamed worldwide via the Moment House platform.

From late 2021 until early 2024, the band was on unofficial hiatus, and no social media posts were made from the band's accounts.

=== 2024–present: Paradise State of Mind, and departure of Sean Cimino ===
In May 2024, the band was confirmed to be working on a new song titled "Lost in Space". This single release was followed by the announcement of a fourth studio album, Paradise State of Mind, released on August 16, 2024, to mostly positive reviews yet commercially underperforming. This has in part been attributed to the band's unofficial hiatus between 2021 and 2024 with no announcement of new music during this period, causing many fans to speculate the band was no longer together. Despite the commercial underperformance, the album is the highest rated album by Foster the People on Metacritic compared to their previous two albums.

Mark Foster confirmed the departure of Sean Cimino from the band, but stated he had contributed guitar and electronics to several tracks on the new record.

Foster also announced a collaboration with Electric Guest that would be released separately to the album.

Between 2024 and 2025, they focused on the album's promotional tour in the United States, Latin America, and Europe.. The band's tours in 2025 featured some DJ sets by Foster and Innis, culminating in the release of two EPs focused on remixes (including some original FTP material).

== Musical style ==
Foster the People's musical style has been described indie pop, synth-pop, dance-pop, alternative rock, indie rock, neo-psychedelia, indietronica, and psychedelic pop.

== Members ==
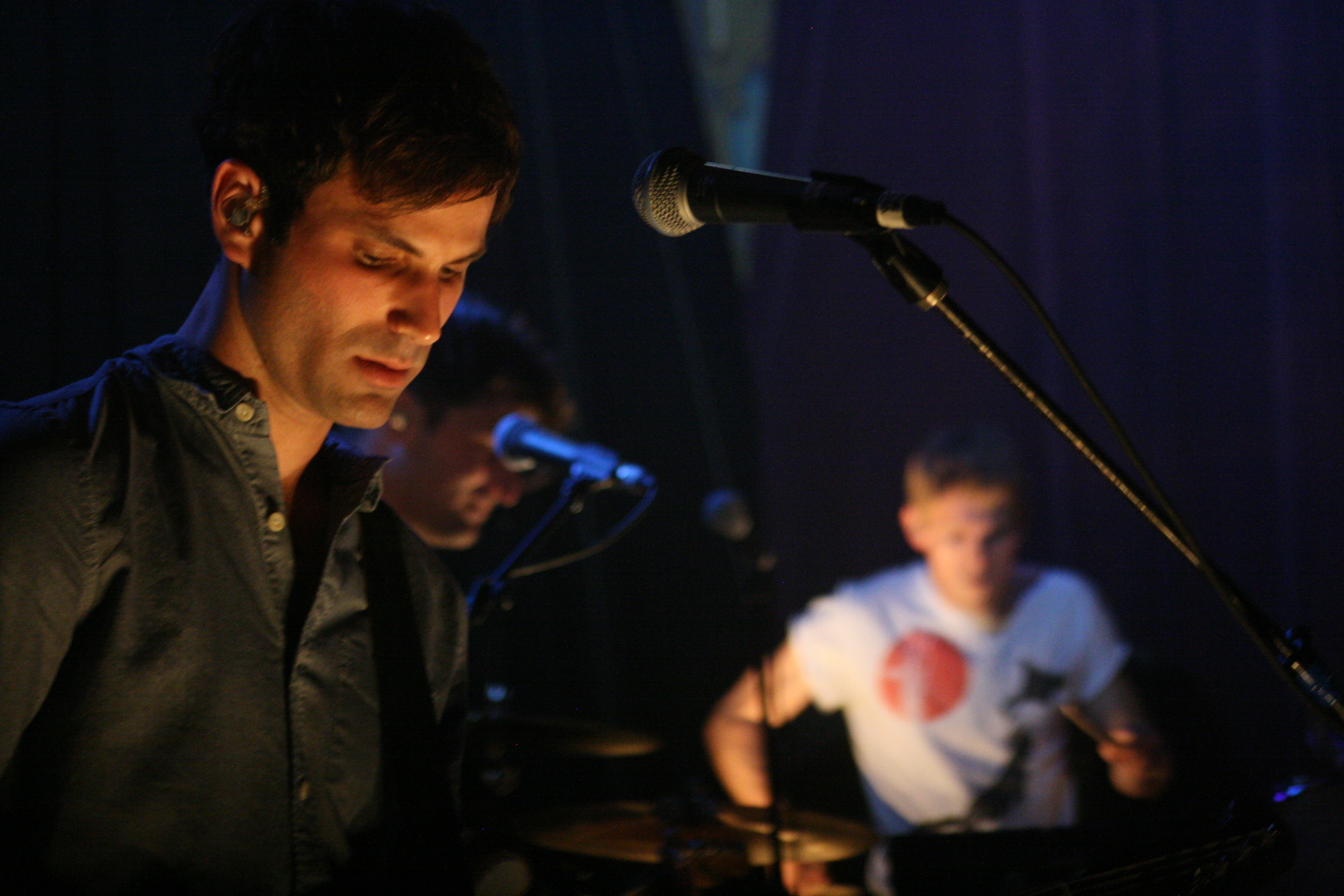
Sean Cimino (front) with the group at the Bluebird Theater in June 2011

Current

- Mark Foster – lead vocals, guitar, piano, keyboards, synthesizers, bass (2009–present)
- Isom Innis – piano, keyboards, synthesizers, drums, percussion, backing vocals, bass (2017–present; touring member 2010–2017) (Note: Also reported as having joined in 2011.)

Former

- Mark Pontius – drums, percussion, occasional backing vocals (2009–2021)
- Jacob "Cubbie" Fink – bass, guitar, backing vocals, synthesizers (2009–2015)
- Sean Cimino – guitar, piano, keyboards, synthesizers, backing vocals (2017–2024; touring member 2010–2017)

Touring musicians

- Alex Foote – guitar (2025–present)
- Micah Moffett – bass, keyboards (2024–present)
- Aaron Steele – drums (2024–present)

Former touring musicians

- Zach "Reazon" Heiligman – MPC (2009–2010)
- Phil Danyew – guitar, piano, keyboards, synthesizers, percussion, backing vocals (2014–2020)
- Haley Louise Dekle – backing vocals (2014)
- Arlene Deradoorian – backing vocals (2014)
- Tyler Halford – bass, keyboards, synthesizers (2015–c. 2020)
- Gabe Noel – bass, keyboards (2015, 2021)
- Aaron Redfield – drums, percussion (2021)
- Brad Ripley – guitar, keyboards, backing vocals (2024)
- Zane Carney – guitar (2024–?)

== Discography ==
- Torches (2011)
- Supermodel (2014)
- Sacred Hearts Club (2017)
- Paradise State of Mind (2024)

== Awards and nominations ==
Billboard Music Awards

Year	Nominee / work	Award	Result
2012	Foster the People	Top New Artist	Nominated
2012	Foster the People	Rock Artist of the Year	Nominated
2012	Foster the People	Alternative Artist of the Year	Nominated
2012	Torches	Rock Album of the Year	Nominated
2012	"Pumped Up Kicks"	Top Rock Song	Won
2019	"Sit Next to Me"	Top Rock Song	Nominated

Berlin Music Video Awards

The Berlin Music Video Awards is an international festival that promotes the art of music videos.

Year	Nominee/ work	Award	Result	Ref.
2025	"Lost in Space"	Best Art Director	Nominated	

BRIT Awards

Year	Nominee / work	Award	Result
2012	Foster the People	International Breakthrough Act	Nominated

Grammy Awards

Year	Nominee / work	Award	Result
2012	"Pumped Up Kicks"	Best Pop Duo/Group Performance	Nominated
2012	Torches	Best Alternative Album	Nominated
2013	"Houdini"	Best Short Form Music Video	Nominated

Hungarian Music Awards

Year	Nominee / work	Award	Result	Ref.
2012	Torches	Best Foreign Alternative Album	Nominated	

iHeartRadio Music Awards

Year	Nominee / work	Award	Result	Ref.
2019	"Sit Next to Me"	Song of the Year	Nominated	

MTV Europe Music Awards

Year	Nominee / work	Award	Result
2012	Foster the People	Best Push Act	Nominated

MtvU Woodie Awards

Year	Nominee / work	Award	Result
2012	Foster the People	Woodie of the Year	Nominated

MTV Video Music Awards

Year	Nominee / work	Award	Result
2011	Foster the People	Best New Artist	Nominated
2011	"Pumped Up Kicks"	Best Rock Video	Nominated

MuchMusic Video Awards

Year	Nominee / work	Award	Result
2012	"Houdini"	International Video of the Year – Group	Nominated
2012	"Helena Beat"	Most Streamed Video of the Year	Nominated
2014	"Coming of Age"	International Video of the Year – Group	Nominated

MVPA Awards

Year	Nominee / work	Award	Result
2013	"Houdini"	Best Director of a Band	Won
2013	"Houdini"	Best Computer Effects	Won
2013	"Houdini"	Director of the Year	Nominated
2013	"Houdini"	Best Pop Video	Nominated
2013	"Houdini"	Best Cinematography	Nominated
2013	"Houdini"	Best Special Effects	Nominated

New Music Awards

Year	Nominee / work	Award	Result
2019	Foster the People	Top40 Group of the Year	Nominated

NME Awards

Year	Nominee / work	Award	Result
2012	Foster the People	Best New Band	Nominated
2012	"Pumped Up Kicks"	Dancefloor Anthem	Nominated

Q Awards

Year	Nominee / work	Award	Result
2011	Foster the People	Best New Act	Nominated
2011	"Pumped Up Kicks"	Best Track	Nominated

SharkOne Awards

Year	Nominee / work	Award	Result
2011	Foster the People	New Artist of the Year	Won

Teen Choice Awards

Year	Nominee / work	Award	Result
2012	Foster the People	Choice Rock Group	Nominated
2012	"Pumped Up Kicks"	Choice Music: Rock Song	Nominated
2018	"Sit Next to Me"	Choice Music: Rock Song	Nominated

UK Music Video Awards

Year	Nominee / work	Award	Result
2012	"Houdini"	Best Rock/Indie Video	Nominated
2012	"Houdini"	Best VFX	Nominated

WEQX Award

Year	Nominee / work	Award	Result
2011	"Pumped Up Kicks"	Song of the Year	Won
