= Best Friend (Foster the People song) =

Single by Foster the People

from the album Supermodel
- Released: March 10, 2014
- Recorded: 2013
- Genre: Post-disco; indie pop
- Length: 4:30
- Label: Columbia
- Songwriters: Mark Foster; Isom Innis
- Producers: Paul Epworth; Mark Foster

Foster the People singles chronology
"Pseudologia Fantastica" (2014)	"Best Friend" (2014)	"Are You What You Want to Be?" (2014)

"Best Friend" is a song by American indie pop band Foster the People. The song is featured as the seventh track on the band's second studio album Supermodel and was released as the record's third single by Columbia Records on March 10, 2014. "Best Friend" was remixed by Australian future bass producer Wave Racer; A-Trak and gLAdiator; and also by band members Foster and Innis as Smims & Belle.

== Music video ==
A lyric video for "Best Friend", animated by Young & Sick, was uploaded to YouTube on March 11, 2014. The song's official video was directed by Ben Brewer, and offered what Mark Foster described as "a playful take, not too heavy handed” on the fashion industry and the pressure put on female models regarding their image.

=== Synopsis ===
The film opens with a supermodel waking up from the floor with a cigarette in her hand, with Mark Foster watching from a chair. She prepares and heads to a photo shoot for a cover of a fashion magazine. The band is seen playing in the animated background. The supermodel is then shown in a restroom, in regret. Another supermodel is shown alongside her, and when Foster screams; "It dries up", the supermodel turns to cannibalism, eating the other supermodel alive and whole, except her dress, and coughs up her rings and necklace. She then gains physical features, and is shown on a magazine article differently in style.

While the model is at the gym, she notices a woman with slim legs (preferably when a magazine shows her quote: "I'd KILL For LEGS Like Yours!"). In animated scene, the woman leaves and the model mutates into a hideous beast, devouring the woman and gaining her features. She is shown with Mark Pontius at a bar, whom she shows her legs to, which grow in size. Various advertisements show her with her enlarged legs. Through an advertisement, we learn that she has eaten another model.

The film then cuts to the supermodel altering her physical features; smooth skin, enlarged neck, and broader eyes. The camera zooms into the model's mouth and down her throat and we then see the three models she has eaten trapped in her stomach: the one without the dress, the gymnast, and the other supermodel. One throws up a shoe, and the model coughs it up. She then alters her features more, with a bigger and slimmer abdomen. Another advertisement shows her all altered features.

Through a sign, we can see that the model has signed up for a fashion show, with Foster watching from the crowd. While the other models are being showcased, the supermodel is shown taking drugs, in her original form, due to a limited amount of time to showcase her altered features. A model walks downstairs and enters her room. The supermodel is then shown swallowing her, with her jaw enlarged and a slimy snake-like tongue being used. The legs of the woman who is being eaten alive start kicking more and more frantically the more she is swallowed.

Finally, the supermodel walks down the stage as a grotesque, freakish looking humanoid, horrifying the audience. While there, she vomits up a dress, and stretched, wavy arms and hands are photographing the supermodel (resembling the cover of Supermodel). The model withers back to her original form, and while Foster is singing the last lines, she is shown gasping for air, and dies.

== Track listing ==
Digital download
No.	Title	Writer(s)	Length
1.	"Best Friend"	Mark Foster; Isom Innis	4:27

== Personnel ==
Foster the People

- Cubbie Fink – bass
- Mark Foster – lead vocals, piano, percussion, synthesizer
- Mark Pontius – drums

Additional personnel

- Isom Imnis – synthesizer, drums, programming, guitar
- Sean Cimino – electric guitar, additional effects
- Stewart Pico Cole – horns

== Charts ==
=== Weekly charts ===
Chart (2014)	Peak position
Canada Hot 100 (Billboard)	86
Canada Rock (Billboard)	34
France (SNEP)	150
Switzerland Airplay (Schweizer Hitparade)	99
US Bubbling Under Hot 100 (Billboard)	19
US Hot Rock & Alternative Songs (Billboard)	21
US Alternative Airplay (Billboard)	15
US Rock & Alternative Airplay (Billboard)	22

=== Year-end charts ===
Chart (2014)	Position
US Alternative Songs (Billboard)	48

== Release history ==
Country	Date	Format	Label
Australia	March 10, 2014	Digital download	Columbia
Canada	March 10, 2014	Digital download	Columbia
United States	March 10, 2014	Digital download	Columbia
United States	April 8, 2014	Modern rock radio	Columbia
United States	May 19, 2014	Adult album alternative radio	Columbia
Italy	June 6, 2014	Contemporary hit radio	Sony
United Kingdom	June 23, 2014	Contemporary hit radio	Columbia
