= Supermodel (album) =

Studio album by Foster the People
- Released: March 14, 2014
- Recorded: October 2011 – January 2014
- Genres: Indie pop; alternative rock; neo-psychedelia; alternative dance
- Length: 47:57
- Label: Columbia
- Producers: Paul Epworth; Mark Foster

Foster the People chronology
Torches (2011)	Supermodel (2014)	III (2017)

Singles from Supermodel
- 1. "Coming of Age" Released: January 14, 2014; 2. "Pseudologia Fantastica" Released: February 25, 2014; 3. "Best Friend" Released: March 10, 2014; 4. "Are You What You Want to Be?" Released: September 8, 2014

Supermodel is the second studio album by American indie pop band Foster the People. The album was co-produced by their frontman Mark Foster and British musician Paul Epworth, and was released by Columbia Records on March 14, 2014, in Friday-release countries and March 18, 2014, in the United States. It is the follow-up to the band's 2011 debut album, Torches.

A concept album, Supermodel features themes of negativity towards modern popular culture and consumer ideology throughout the record and its related artworks. Conceived mostly by Foster, the album deals primarily with social issues and "the ugly side of capitalism", and is described by Foster as "a conversation with God. Trying to explore who God is." Recorded and produced throughout 2012 and 2013, the album also features a departure from the sound of Torches, utilizing more acoustic instruments and various sounds of different cultures of the world while retaining the "perfect pop record" sound. The band wrote and recorded many of the songs while finishing up touring their first album, completing it over a nearly three-year period.

The album was heavily promoted by the band and Columbia Records in the lead-up to its release, with an accompanying documentary series of the same name and a 130-foot mural painted in Los Angeles, the largest on the West Coast of the United States. The album was preceded by three singles released by Columbia in 2014: "Coming of Age" released in January 2014, "Pseudologia Fantastica" in February, and "Best Friend" in March. Upon release, Supermodel received mixed reviews from critics yet remains a fan favorite.

== Background ==
Forming in 2009, Foster the People released their debut album Torches in 2011. The album, produced by Paul Epworth, Greg Kurstin, Rich Costey, Tony Hoffer and Mark Foster, was released to positive reception, and peaked at number eight on the Billboard 200 in the US and number one on the ARIA Albums Chart in Australia. It has been certified platinum in Australia and the US. In the Philippines and Canada, Torches was certified gold. The album was also nominated for the 2011 Grammy Award for Best Alternative Music Album, losing to Bon Iver's Bon Iver, Bon Iver. Capitalizing on their success following the release of Torches, six singles were released by the band across 2011 and 2012: "Pumped Up Kicks", which became a major hit worldwide, peaking at number three on the Billboard Hot 100 and topping the Australian, Canadian, Polish and Slovak singles charts; "Helena Beat", which topped the Canadian singles chart and became the most played track on Australian radio station Triple J in 2011; "Call It What You Want", which has been certified Gold in Australia; "Don't Stop (Color on the Walls)", which has been certified gold in the United States and Canada; "Broken Jaw / Ruby", which was released exclusively on Record Store Day; and "Houdini", whose companion music video was nominated for Best Short Form Music Video at the 55th Annual Grammy Awards.

To follow up Torches, frontman Mark Foster wanted an album with "more grit" than Torches, and looked to British rock bands such as The Clash and The Kinks for inspiration. He also cited influences from West African music and David Bowie, complementary to a need for the band's music to be more instrumentally based rather than electronic as additional driving factors in the creative process. Foster spoke to music magazine Rolling Stone in August 2012, stating:

"One thing about Foster The People is that it's taking pieces of a lot of different genres of music and kind of melding them together. In the first record, I was looking at my vision for the project through a piece of opaque glass. This next record's going to be more evolved; it's going to be a clearer picture of what I've had in my head when it comes to that vision. Working on this project and getting deeper into electronic music is gonna help bring a deeper colour in the next Foster record."

Deciding on the final name for the album, Foster "wanted it called ‘A Beginner's Guide To Destroying The Moon’" or "‘Pseudologia Fantastica’", but came to the conclusion that "these names were too hard to remember" and "too hard to say", so the band opted to go for the name "Supermodel" instead. "A Beginner's Guide To Destroying The Moon" and "Pseudologia Fantastica" would later become songs on the album, with the latter being released as a single.

== Concept and composition ==
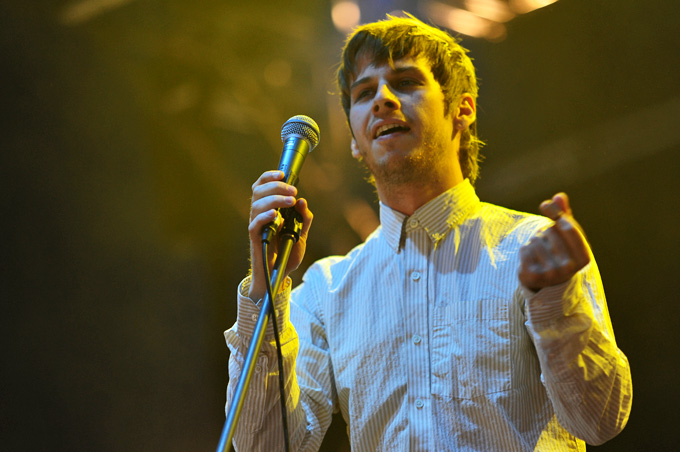
Most of the album's themes were derived from Mark Foster's personal feelings about social issues at the time of writing.

The themes and lyrics of Supermodel have been described by frontman Mark Foster as "angry", with most of the content dealing with personal issues and ideas he had during the recording of the album, most of which revolves around a negative outlook on consumerism ideology and "the ugly side of capitalism". Foster added in the Supermodel documentary series that the record's title, the record itself and its artwork were created out of the idea of how our self-worth, in a modern perspective, is judged on how many "retweets" or "likes" we get, and our need to present ourselves like supermodels, showing others who we want them to perceive us as while hiding our real selves. Supermodel features a more natural sound in contrast to its electronically influenced predecessor, Torches, with a bigger focus on guitar and instruments of world culture.

== Recording ==
During the latter stages of writing and recording for Supermodel, the band used a portable studio to record song demos and early takes while they were on their 2012 world tour, which lasted from January to October 2012 the Band Had Demoed the album on the 2011 - 2012 Tour the group has had schedules of demos from October 2011 to October 2012 for less than a year recorded it more Shotgun November 2012 to early 2012 and for a little bit over a year till March 2014 release . The band recorded the album with the ideology that "uncomfortability sometimes produces the best art", where the band would record with different instruments in a different environment to what they were used to, potentially creating a multiculturally influenced sound. The album was recorded in a two-step process, where the instrumentals for the songs were composed and recorded first before lyrics were written and sung.

== Packaging ==
The artwork for the album was designed by Young & Sick, the same artist who did the artwork for the band's debut studio album, 2011's Torches. Supermodel's cover features an abstract surreal depiction of a model surrounded by a crowd of people and paparazzi holding up cameras and taking photographs as she poses on a stand. It also depicts the model reciting poetry, written as it streams downwards, enlarging as it reaches towards the bottom of the artwork; it reads:

I ate it all; plastic, diamonds and sugar-coated arsenic as we danced in honey and sea-salt sprinkled laxative. Coral blossomed portraits in Rembrandt light; cheekbones high and fashionable. Snap! goes the moment; a photograph is time travel, like the light of dead stars painting us with their warm, titanic blood. Parasitic kaleidoscopes and psychotropic glow worms stop me dead in my tracks. Aphids sucking the red off a rose, but for beauty I will gladly feed my life into the mouths of rainbows; their technicolor teeth cutting prisms and smiling benevolently on the pallid hue of the working class hero.

Foster later stated in the Supermodel documentary series that the artwork was created with the idea of redefining what the word "supermodel" meant. Described by Foster as "a woman vomiting in a back alleyway surrounded by photographers capturing her moment of weakness, where she doesn't want to be near anybody; vomiting a poem about consumption that she had consumed", the artwork reflects Foster's idea of the record and the title of the album.

== Promotion ==
The Supermodel mural, painted in promotion of the album, located in Los Angeles, California.

After posting a teaser trailer on the band's official YouTube channel on New Year's Day, Supermodel was officially unveiled on January 13, 2014.

The artwork for the album, designed by Young & Sick, was painted over the facade of a building located on 539 S Los Angeles Street in Los Angeles, California with assistance from American artist Daniel Lahoda, American street artists Leba and American graffiti art groups LA Freewalls and Vyal. The mural, painted on the entire face of the 100 ft building, was executed through the night of December 29, 2013 to the morning of January 9, 2014, and took over 12 days to finish, with 16 hours being given each day by the painters. The mural was officially measured at 148 ft by 126 ft, making the artwork the largest mural ever constructed on the West Coast of the United States. The Supermodel mural, however, was later painted over following some legal controversy with the Los Angeles government and building owners.

Three singles have been released by the band in promotion of Supermodel. "Coming of Age" was released in the United States on January 14, 2014, as the lead single promoting the album. Two music videos were also produced to accompany the single. "Pseudologia Fantastica" was released as album's second single on February 25, 2014. After an interview on Edmonton radio station SONiC 102.9 on February 16, 2014, where Mark Foster stated that he intended to release a third single before the album's release; "Best Friend" was released as the record's third single on March 10, 2014.

A serialized documentary series eponymously titled Supermodel was produced by the band in further promotion of Supermodel. The series, which has produced five episodes, documents the creation of Supermodel and the ideas and events surrounding the creative process of the album and insight into the album's different tracks. Narrated by Mark Foster, the series premiered on March 6, 2014, on Foster the People's official YouTube channel.

== Critical reception ==
Professional ratings
Aggregate scores
Source	Rating
AnyDecentMusic?	5.8/10
Metacritic	58/100
Review scores
Source	Rating
AllMusic	3.5/5 stars
The A.V. Club	B
Billboard	4/5 stars
The Guardian	2/5 stars
NME	7/10
Q	3/5 stars
Rolling Stone	2/5 stars
Spin	5/10
Uncut	8/10
USA Today	3/4 stars

Upon its release, Supermodel was met with mixed reviews from music critics. Although the majority of the reviews compare and contrast the album with the band's debut studio album Torches, critics have both praised and criticized the sound of the album, the themes of the album, and the contrast between the lighter instrumentals and the darker lyrics. At Metacritic, which assigns a normalized rating out of 100 to reviews from mainstream critics, the album received an average score of 58, which indicates "mixed or average reviews", based on 25 reviews as of April 11, 2014.

Brian Mansfield, writing for USA Today, described the album as "global-minded pop unspooled to ambition’s farthest edges." Uncut also gave a positive review of the album, stating in their April 2014 issue that "the sound they've fashioned is glossy and supersaturated while still exhibiting the subversive impulse that yielded the supremely catchy but subtly sinister smash 'Pumped Up Kicks'". Melanie Haupt of The Austin Chronicle stated that the band, "working on an epic, operatic canvas, hide the spinach of existential angst into sweetly binge-worthy dance pop". John Aizlewood, writing for Q, opined that the "occasionally super Supermodel is an album of transition rather than a definitive statement". PopMatters writer Jeff Koch opined that the record was "startlingly different from Torches" and a "massive surprise", but nonetheless "achingly, devastatingly beautiful." Matt Collar of AllMusic wrote that Supermodel "finds Foster and company sticking to their winning pop formula, while evincing a more organic, less claustrophobic studio sound." Collar stated that the record expanded on the "twenty-something angst" explored in Torches, revealing a "more introspective, enigmatic, world-weary tone."

Garrett Kamps of Spin stated that Supermodel's songs "suck, which is odd, because the formula has not dramatically changed" and that the "devilishly catchy" and "very, very enjoyable" nature of Torches was "virtually impossible [to replicate]." Kamps felt that the band were "behind the times", and that "Supermodel's failing is that it's copying one of the foundational records of this trend, which is, you guessed it, Torches. It's hard to think outside a box you built yourself". Reed Fischer of the Alternative Press panned the album as "all flash and no substance" and wrote that the "umpteen attempts at serious lyrics topple this album right off the runway." Christopher R. Weingarten, writing for Rolling Stone, wrote that Supermodel was nearly devoid of any original thoughts. Benji Taylor of Clash wrote a mixed review of the record, describing it as "an unashamedly vibrant collection of variegated pop songs" but commenting that "the uplifting instrumentation is often at odds with the dark themes explored".

== Commercial performance ==
In the United States, the album debuted at number three on the US Billboard 200 with first-week sales of 54,000 copies. The album also debuted at numbers 106 and 104 respectively on the Belgian Flanders and Wallonia charts, while it peaked at number 57 in the Netherlands.

== Track listing ==
Supermodel
No.	Title	Writer(s)	Producer(s)	Length
1.	"Are You What You Want to Be?"	Mark Foster; Greg Kurstin		4:30
2.	"Ask Yourself"	Foster; Kurstin		4:23
3.	"Coming of Age"	Foster; Mark Pontius; Isom Innis; Jacob Fink; Sean Cimino; Paul Epworth	Foster; Epworth	4:40
4.	"Nevermind"	Foster; Epworth		5:17
5.	"Pseudologia Fantastica"	Foster; Epworth	Foster; Epworth	5:31
6.	"The Angelic Welcome of Mr. Jones"	Foster		0:33
7.	"Best Friend"	Foster; Innis		4:28
8.	"A Beginner's Guide to Destroying the Moon"	Foster; Epworth; Mike Volpe; Rakim Mayers		4:39
9.	"Goats in Trees"	Foster; Epworth		5:09
10.	"The Truth"	Foster; Innis; Matthew Wilcox; Luca Venter		4:29
11.	"Fire Escape"	Foster		4:22
Total length:				47:57

Supermodel Pre-order edition
No.	Title	Length
12.	"Tabloid Super Junkie"	6:00
Total length:		53:57

Supermodel Japanese edition
No.	Title	Writer(s)	Length
12.	"Cassius Clay's Pearly Whites"	Foster; Epworth	2:37
Total length:			50:34

Notes

- "A Beginner's Guide to Destroying the Moon" contains a sample of "LVL", as performed by A$AP Rocky.

== Personnel ==
Foster the People

- Mark Foster – vocals (all tracks), synthesizer (tracks 1–3, 5, 7, 8, 10), percussion (tracks 1, 2, 7), electric guitar (tracks 1–6, 8, 9), acoustic guitar (tracks 2, 4, 9, 11), synth bass (tracks 2, 9, 10), harpsichord (tracks 2, 3), piano (tracks 3–5, 7, 8, 10, 11), vibraphone (tracks 6, 9, 11), celeste (tracks 6, 11), drums, programming (track 9)
- Jacob Fink – bass (tracks 1, 3–8), backing vocals (track 5)
- Mark Pontius – drums (tracks 1–8, 10), backing vocals (track 5)

Additional musicians

- Isom Innis – synthesizer (tracks 1, 3, 7, 9, 10), programming (tracks 3, 7–10), backing vocals (track 5), drums (tracks 7, 10), guitar (track 7), piano (track 8)
- Sean Cimino – electric guitar (tracks 1, 4, 5, 7–10), acoustic guitar (track 3), additional effects (tracks 3, 7), pedal steel (tracks 4, 9), backing vocals (track 5)
- Greg Kurstin – programming (tracks 1, 2)
- Paul Epworth – synthesizer (track 1), programming (1–4, 9, 10), modular synthesizer (tracks 2–4, 10), drums, horn (track 4)
- Amy Langley – cello (track 4)
- Stewart Pico Cole – horns (tracks 7, 10)
- Matthew Wilcox – drums, drum programming (track 10)
- Luca Venter – drums (track 10)

Technical

- Paul Epworth – producer
- Matt Wiggins – engineer; mixing (track 6)
- Joseph Hartwell Jones – assistant engineer
- Rich Costey – mixing (tracks 1–5, 7–10)
- Martin Cooke – mixing assistant (tracks 1–5, 7–10)
- Nicolas Fournier – mixing assistant (tracks 1–5, 7–10)
- Bo Hill – mixing assistant (tracks 1–5, 7–10)
- Darrell Thorp – additional engineering (tracks 7, 10)
- Greg Calbi – mastering
- Carson Donnelly – A&R
- Isaac Green – A&R
- Brent Kredel – management
- Ian Montone – management
- Nicky Stein – legal counsel
- David Weise – management
- Brett Williams – management
- Young & Sick – design, illustrations
- Dave Bett – creative director
- Anita Marisa Boriboon – art direction, design

== Charts ==
=== Weekly charts ===
Chart (2014)	Peak position
Australian Albums (ARIA)	8
Belgian Albums (Ultratop Flanders)	93
Belgian Albums (Ultratop Wallonia)	104
Canadian Albums (Billboard)	4
Finnish Albums (Suomen virallinen lista)	50
French Albums (SNEP)	51
Dutch Albums (Album Top 100)	57
New Zealand Albums (RMNZ)	17
Polish Albums (ZPAV)	16
Scottish Albums (Official Charts)	31
Spanish Albums (Promusicae)	70
Swiss Albums (Schweizer Hitparade)	17
UK Albums (Official Charts)	26
UK Album Downloads (Official Charts)	11
US Billboard 200	3
US Top Alternative Albums (Billboard)	1
US Top Rock Albums (Billboard)	1

=== Year-end charts ===
Chart (2014)	Position
US Billboard 200	189
US Top Rock Albums (Billboard)	42
US Alternative Albums (Billboard)	26

== Release history ==
Region	Date	Format	Label	Catalog no.
Australia	March 14, 2014	Digital download	Columbia Records	none
New Zealand	March 14, 2014	Digital download	Columbia Records	none
France	March 17, 2014	Digital download	Columbia Records	none
United States	March 18, 2014	CD	Columbia Records	88883 77758 2
United States	March 18, 2014	Digital download	Columbia Records	none
United States	March 18, 2014	Vinyl	Columbia Records	C-377758
United Kingdom	March 24, 2014	Digital download	Columbia Records	none
