= Mark Foster (musician) =

American musician (born 1984)

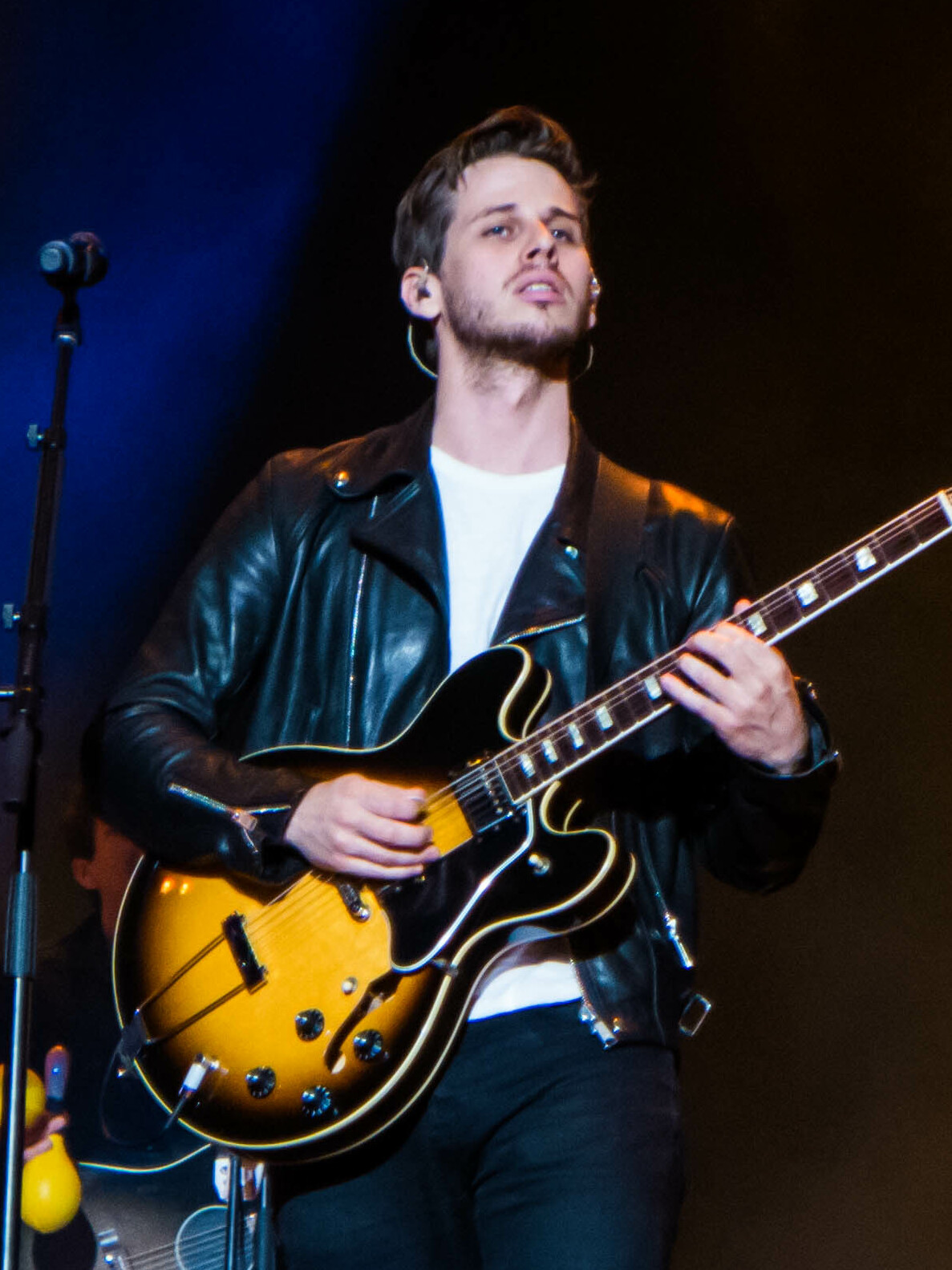
- Foster in 2014

Background information
- Also known as: Mister Smims
- Born: Mark Derek Foster; February 29, 1984 (age 42); Milpitas, California, U.S.
- Origin: Macedonia, Ohio, U.S.
- Genres: Indie pop; alternative rock; indie rock; dance-pop; indie electronic
- Occupations: Musician; singer; songwriter
- Instruments: Vocals; guitar; keyboards
- Years active: 2004–present
- Labels: Startime; Columbia
- Member of: Foster the People
- Spouse: Julia Garner (m. 2019; sep. 2026)
- Website: fosterthepeople.com

Mark Derek Foster (born February 29, 1984) is an American musician, singer, and songwriter, best known as the lead singer of the band Foster the People. After struggling to create a successful band in his early twenties, Foster finally had his big break as the founder and frontman of Foster the People in 2009, which he formed alongside his two friends Mark Pontius and Cubbie Fink. The band has since released four studio albums: Torches in 2011, Supermodel in 2014, Sacred Hearts Club in 2017 and Paradise State of Mind in 2024.

== Early life ==
Mark Foster was born on February 29, 1984, in Milpitas, California, and grew up outside Cleveland, Ohio. As a boy, he sang in the Cleveland Orchestra Children's Chorus and played the drums, guitar, and piano. As a teenager he played in garage bands. His first gig came in 2001, when his high-school band competed in a local Battle of the Bands. In 2002, he graduated from Nordonia High School in Macedonia, Ohio.

== Career ==
=== Early career (2002–2008) ===
After graduating from high school in 2002, Foster followed on his father's advice and moved out to live with an uncle in the San Fernando Valley neighborhood of Sylmar, Los Angeles. As a result, he would be closer to pursuing his musical dreams. In an interview with NPR's David Greene, Foster detailed his reaction to the intimidating city into which he had thrown himself, reflecting: "You really got to have a strong sixth sense to be able to kind of navigate the waters because the weird thing about LA is just—especially in Hollywood—is just like, the entertainment industry is kind of bizarre. It was the first time that I realized that people that were mentally ill also happened to be in like, powerful positions."

Foster's early years in Los Angeles were very difficult for him; of that time, he said "For eight years, I just scraped by as a starving artist delivering pizzas, sleeping on couches, sleeping in my car and all of those things." Foster worked various odd jobs during his first several years on his own while trying to grow his own social network. These included waiting tables, painting houses, telemarketing, and bartending. In a 2012 interview with The Baltimore Sun, he talked about how he particularly valued bartending and encouraged aspiring musicians to follow in his footsteps: "Kids hit me up on Twitter and I tell them to learn how to bar-tend. There are career waiters in Los Angeles and they're making over $100,000 a year."

In his first six years in Los Angeles, Foster did not have much success with breaking into the music business as a solo artist. At age 21 his band almost secured a record deal in New York. About two years later, he was given the opportunity to work with Dr. Dre's record label, Aftermath Entertainment. However, the deal fell through and he was left without solid footing for a solo musical career. Foster co-composed and performed lead vocals on the Toques' song "Breakdown", featured in the 2006 film Stick It. He found early work as a musician working for comedian Andy Dick, for whom he wrote songs and scores for film, television, and short film projects, as well as toured with, over a period of around seven years. As a solo artist, Foster wrote the song "The Ballad of Andy", detailing the life and tribulations of Dick. Foster also worked as a music producer, producing songs for bands like Frodad and The Rondo Brothers, among others.

At the same time, Foster was a drug addict, but after seeing its impact on his health and his friends, he decided that he would rehabilitate himself. He talked about his previous addiction in 2014, saying, "I work really hard to stay grounded and not let any of that stuff influence how I live my life. A lot of it is a mirage, and an unhealthy one to buy into." His roommate, actor and singer Brad Renfro, who was also a drug addict, died from a heroin overdose on January 15, 2008. Foster was the producer of the last song that Renfro ever recorded. Fifteen months after his former roommate's death, Foster released a song called "Downtown", on which he reflects on the life and death of Renfro.

=== Foster the People (2008–present) ===
Foster finally landed a job as a commercial jingle writer for the record label Mophonics in 2008. In this position, he was able to write jingles for brands such as Honey Bunches of Oats and Verizon. (Foster has discussed his use of medical cannabis, prescribed for work-related stress, in the composition process.) However, he was still struggling with finding the right tunes to further break into the music industry. Due to issues of writer's block and being unable to focus various elements of his music together, he came to the realization that he needed help in the form of members of a band.

The following year, Foster recorded and released his first and so far, only solo album, Solo Songs. The nine-track album included demo versions of two songs from the Torches album, "Don't Stop (Color on the Walls)" and "I Would Do Anything for You". Another song called "Polartropic (You Don't Understand Me)" was featured in the soundtrack of the 2012 animated film Frankenweenie. He played solo shows around Los Angeles to support his record.

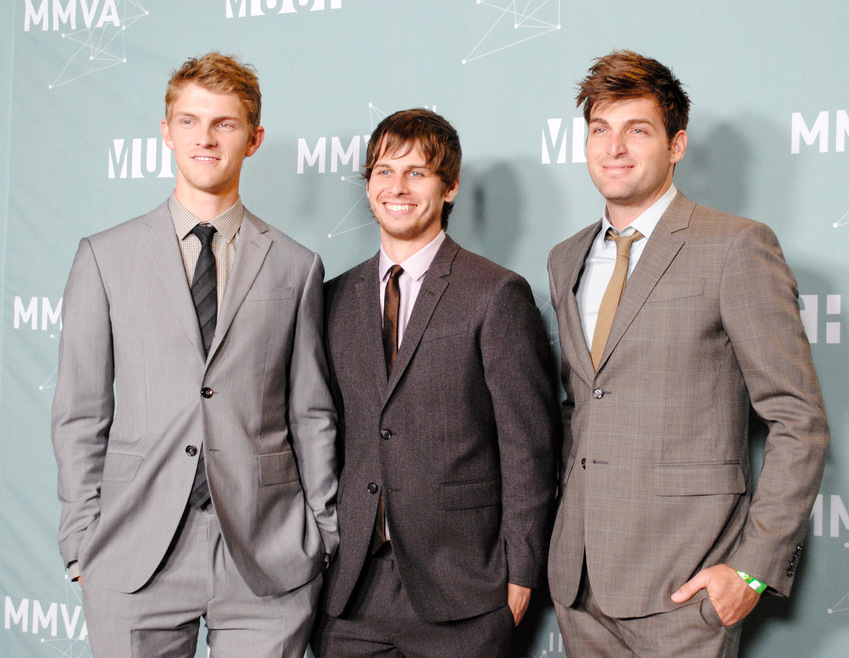
Foster with his original Foster the People bandmates Mark Pontius and Cubbie Fink at the 2011 MuchMusic Video Awards

In October 2009, Foster organized a three-person band made up of himself, colleague Mark Pontius, and longtime friend Jacob "Cubbie" Fink (whom Foster had initially met through a mutual friend whilst attending acting school). Pontius was so appreciative of Foster's musical style that he left his band Malbec to join him as the drummer of the new band. Fink had recently lost his position at a television production company as a result of the recession, so he joined as the bassist. The band was initially going to be called "Foster and the People", but after the majority of his friends mistook the name as "Foster the People", Foster decided to name it the latter instead. He preferred the title "Foster the People" as it conjured an image of care and development.

The first song Foster released with the band was "Pumped Up Kicks", a song about gun violence recorded at Mophonics in 2009. He wrote and recorded the song in five hours using Logic Pro software, originally intending the first version to be only the demo. The demo ended up becoming the full version of the song and "Pumped Up Kicks" was released by Foster online in early 2010. Through internet outlets, the song gradually gained traction with the public, eventually making its way to television shows like Entourage and advertising campaigns for companies like Nylon. In May 2010, the band was signed to Columbia Records imprint Startime International for a multi-album deal due to the song's increasing success. It was officially released as the band's first single on September 14, 2010, and would go on to produce an immense popular following for the band.

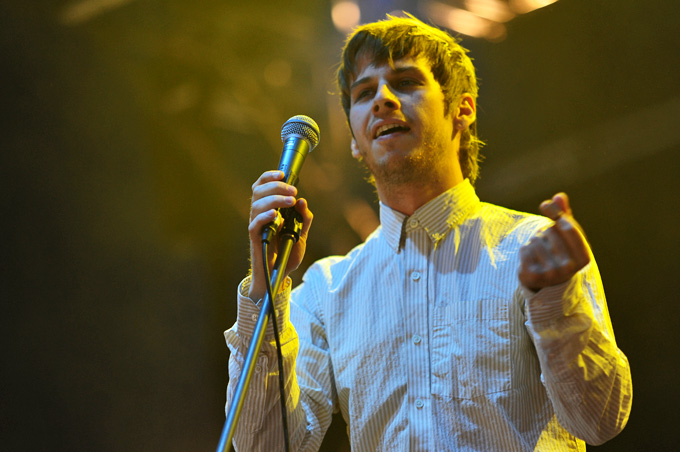
Foster performing at the On the Bright Side Festival in 2011

In January 2011, "Pumped Up Kicks" was released on the band's first non-commercial single release, Foster the People, and started to climb the American charts a few months later. It was labeled as a "sleeper hit" due to its slow rise in popularity. It eventually peaked at number 3 on the Billboard Hot 100 starting with the week of September 10, 2011, and ending on the week of October 29, 2011. It was nominated for the Grammy Award for Best Pop Duo/Group Performance in February 2012. "Pumped Up Kicks" was certified Diamond by the RIAA, one of only 129 songs to achieve that certification.

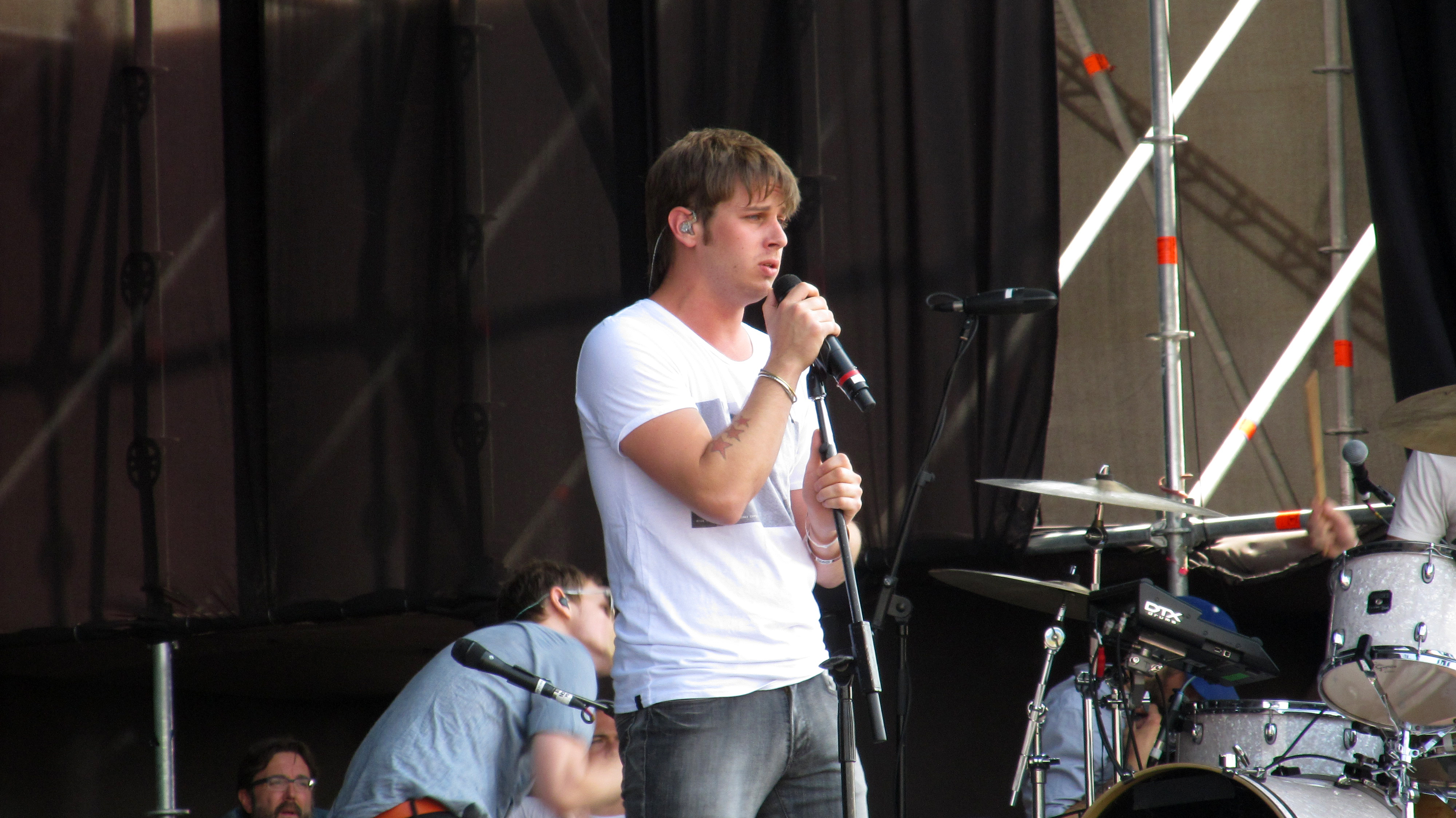
Foster performing at Lollapalooza Chile in 2012

On May 23, 2011, the band's first studio album, Torches, was released and earned Foster his second Grammy Award nomination, one for Best Alternative Music Album. He has stated that the album was one produced from "perspiration over inspiration." It also peaked at number 8 on the Billboard 200.

Alongside Isom Innis, then a touring member of the band, Mark Foster produced electronic music as Mister Smims of the duo Smims & Belle. Under this moniker, Foster and Innis released a notable remix of "Blue Jeans" by Lana Del Rey in 2012, featuring Azealia Banks. Smims & Belle's final (confirmed) release to date was their 2014 remix of a single from Foster the People's second album.

Three years after Torches, the band released their second album, Supermodel, on March 14, 2014. It is currently their highest-peaking studio album on the Billboard 200, at number 3. Foster has said that the theme of the album was influenced by his fascination with the "ugly side" of capitalism as well as the popularity of social media and the social pressures humans feel. In response, he has marked it as a piece which reminds him of the fortune of having a supportive community to maintain an optimistic attitude. He discussed with the Los Angeles Times the revelations he had while touring for the previous album that helped him formulate the theme behind Supermodel: "I went to India, I spent some time in the Middle East and I went to Northern Africa — places where the priorities are completely different. Those cultures aren't focused on individuals. They're focused on communities. That changed how I will look at life. I saw people who had joy and human connections and they don't have one one-thousandth of the things we have here. But they have something we don't have, 'a sense of community.'"

In June 2014, Luke Pritchard – with whom Foster had collaborated previously – revealed that the pair had between three and four unfinished tracks yet to be released.

In 2015, Foster was a producer of the soundtrack for the World War II drama Little Boy (of which one track featured Mark Pontius). It was his first experience scoring a film, and was especially exciting to him due to the "guitar-driven" soundtrack he created.

On July 21, 2017, Foster the People released its third album, Sacred Hearts Club, an album influenced by the global issues of the current times and the sentiment that Foster felt for those affected by events associated with terrorism, racism, homophobia, and elections. Foster said upon the album's release: "I wanted to slap people a little bit, throw some cold water on them. This record, it would have felt wrong to do that. I felt like people needed a hug." The album features hit single "Sit Next to Me", which has been RIAA certified Double Platinum.

In September 2019, Foster the People released the EP Pick U Up. The band has also released two (non-EP) singles, a reworking of a Mobley song, and several collaborations with The Knocks, MØ and Louis the Child. Mark Foster is currently co-writing a horror film.

In December 2020, Foster debuted his radio show Escapology on SiriusXM's Alt Nation. On December 11, the band released their EP In the Darkest of Nights, Let the Birds Sing, a record based on the concept of love.

In August 2021, it was announced that Foster would feature on Taylor Swift's forthcoming album Red (Taylor's Version), which was released on the same day as Foster the People's Torches X in November 2021. Foster had originally co-written the song "Forever Winter" with Swift in May 2012.

== Artistry ==
One of Foster's major musical influences has been The Beach Boys. He and his band performed with them at the 2012 Grammy Awards, and the two bands were able to become well-acquainted during the week of practices leading up to the performance.

== Personal life ==
In 2013, Foster purchased actor Maurice Benard's $2.1 million home in the Hollywood Hills.

Foster has said that he likes traveling frequently because of the break from the special treatment he receives in the U.S. for being famous.

Foster married actress Julia Garner in a December 2019 ceremony at New York City Hall. In July 2026, it was announced they had separated.

== Discography ==
=== As a solo artist ===
- "Sorry Little Lucy" (2007)
- Solo Songs (2009) (Note: Track listing)
- "Polartropic (You Don't Understand Me)" (2012) for Frankenweenie
- Little Boy (soundtrack) (2015) with Stephan Altman
- Let Me Go (The Right Way) [soundtrack] (2022)
- Unstable (Soundtrack from the Netflix Series) (2023–2024) with Sven Faulconer

==== Miscellaneous ====
- Scores for the short films Adcorp, Inc. (2005), Division III (2006), Just the Worst (2008), and The Andys (Note: All films starring, and three co-written by, Andy Dick)
- "Spring Break it Down" for Muscle Milk
- "Beautiful Day" / "Hello" / "Lightspeed" / "Dreamer" / "Love Is Here to Stay" (demos)
- "Sandy"
- "Everyday"
- "Untitled Demo 2010"
- "Untitled Demo 2012"
- "Untitled Demo 2016"
- "Spire Studio Demo" (2019) for iZotope
- "Graduation Speech in 60 Seconds" (2020) for Entertainment Weekly
- "On/Off"
- "Lovers in a Stream"

=== As Smims & Belle (with Isom Innis) ===
- "Blue Jeans (Remix)" (2012) with Lana Del Rey and Azealia Banks
- "Beat Illuminati" (2012)
- "Best Friend (Remix)" (2014) with Foster the People
- "Ghetto Blastah" (2015)

=== With Foster the People ===
- Torches (2011)
- Supermodel (2014)
- Sacred Hearts Club (2017)
- Paradise State of Mind (2024)

==== Guest vocals ====
- "Ride or Die" (2018) with The Knocks; vocals and other instruments on the track
- "Blur" (2018) with MØ; vocals on the track
- "Every Color" (2020) with Louis the Child; vocals and composition
- "All About You" (2020) with The Knocks
- Melody & Silence EP (2021) with The Knocks
- "Hyperlandia" (2021) with deadmau5

== Guest appearances ==
Title	Year	Other artist(s)	Album
"Breakdown"	2006	The Toques	Stick It (Original Soundtrack)
"Billy the Kid" (backing vocals)	2011	Dia Frampton	Red
"Warrior"	2012	Kimbra, A-Trak	Vows
"On the Other Side"	2012	K'Naan	Country, God or the Girl
"We Can Tell the Truth"	2013	Luke Pritchard	Non-album single
"Happy"	2013	Rae & Christian	Mercury Rising
"Nonsense"	2015	Madeon	Adventure
Note: in addition to vocal contributions, most tracks include production and/or songwriting by Foster.

== Songwriting and production credits ==
List of tracks produced or written (or both) by Mark Foster; excluding the above
Title	Year	Artist(s)	Album	Notes
"Believe Again" / "You Will Only Break My Heart"	2007	Delta Goodrem	Delta	Strings recording
"90s Music"	2014	Kimbra featuring Matt Bellamy	The Golden Echo	Songwriter, synths
"Miracle"	2014	Kimbra	The Golden Echo	Synths
"Push"	2015	A-Trak featuring Andrew Wyatt	Entourage (soundtrack)	Songwriter
Various	2015	Grace Mitchell	Raceday EP	Songwriter, production
"Joan of Arc"	2017	Ricky Reed	Non-album single	Songwriter, production
"Treat You Better"	2018	RÜFÜS DU SOL	Solace	Songwriter
"Simple Romance"	2018	COIN	Dreamland	Songwriter, production
"I Want It All"	2019	COIN	Dreamland	Songwriter, production
"Sex Drive"	2019	Machine Gun Kelly	Hotel Diablo	Songwriter, recording engineer
"Lose My Cool"	2020	ROMES	Non-album single	Songwriter, production
"Pitchfork"	2021	Zane Carney Quartet	Alter Ego	Songwriter
"Forever Winter"	2021	Taylor Swift	Red (Taylor's Version)	Songwriter, background vocals
