= Mark Pontius =

American musician (born 1985)

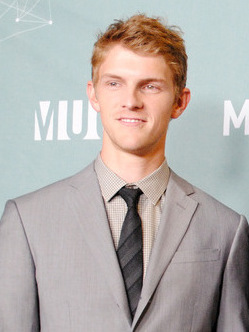
- Pontius in 2011

Background information
- Also known as: Ponsi
- Born: Mark Andrew Pontius; January 3, 1985 (age 41); Orlando, Florida, U.S.
- Genres: Indie pop; alternative rock; indie rock
- Occupation: Musician
- Instruments: Drums; percussion
- Years active: 2003–present
- Member of: Suitnop
- Formerly of: Malbec; Foster the People; Delivery; Mr. Gabriel

Mark Andrew Pontius (born January 3, 1985) is an American musician who is best known as a founding member and drummer of the American alt pop band Foster the People; he left the band in 2021. Prior to joining Foster the People in 2009, Pontius was part of the now-defunct indie pop band Malbec.

== Early life ==
Pontius was born on January 3, 1985, in Orlando, Florida to Harriet and Lawrence Lee "Larry" Pontius. Growing up, Pontius drummed in garage bands and community groups. Pontius graduated from Lyman High School in Longwood, Florida in 2003.

After graduating high school, Pontius moved to Los Angeles to study cinematography. He attended and graduated from film school but pursued a career in music after graduation. In 2004 and 2005, Pontius appeared on the GSN game show Extreme Dodgeball, competing for the Silent But Deadly Mimes in one season and the Reef Sharks in the second season.

== Career ==
=== 2003–2010: Malbec and early musical contributions ===
After moving to Los Angeles, Pontius joined the indie pop band Malbec which was fronted by Pablo Signori and included music producer Speakerbomb.

Besides being the band's drummer, Pontius also directed and edited all of their music videos. Pontius left the band in December 2009 and subsequently formed Foster the People. Malbec disbanded the following year.

=== 2010–2021: Foster the People ===
Around the fall of 2009, Mark Foster recorded the song "Pumped Up Kicks" at his workplace and it was released as an early single for the band. In May 2010, the band was signed to Columbia Records imprint Startime International for a multi-album deal due to the song's increasing success. "Pumped Up Kicks" was officially re-released as the band's first single on September 14, 2010; it was labeled as a "sleeper hit" and eventually peaked at number three on the Billboard Hot 100 starting with the week of September 10, 2011. It was nominated for the Grammy Award for Best Pop Duo/Group Performance in February 2012.

On May 23, 2011, the band's first studio album, Torches, was released and earned the band their second Grammy Award nomination, one for Best Alternative Music Album. It also peaked at number eight on the Billboard 200. Three years later, the band released their second album, Supermodel on March 14, 2014. It is currently their highest peaking studio album on the Billboard 200 at number three. On July 21, 2017, Foster the People released its third album, Sacred Hearts Club, an album influenced by the global issues of the current times, which featured the single "Sit Next to Me."

In 2017 and 2018, Pontius worked with Gabe Simon under the name Mr Gabriel. The two produced a series of tracks together, including "Holy Water," a song produced at Pontius' Tennessee studio, Fat Horse Ranch, which includes archival drums and bass performed by his late father.

He left the band in 2021 to focus on his family.

== Personal life ==
Pontius has one daughter. He lives in Nashville, Tennessee. In October 2025, Pontius married long-term partner Jessa Reed.

== Discography ==
=== Studio albums ===
With Malbec

- Malbec EP (2006)
- Keep It A Secret EP (2007)
- Dawn of Our Age (2008)
- Answering Machine EPs (2008–2009); 5 EP project

As Delivery (solo project)

- Takes My Time (2010)

With Foster the People

- Torches (2011)
- Supermodel (2014)
- Sacred Hearts Club (2017)

As Suitnop (solo project)

- Phage One EP (2022)
- Phage Two EP (2022)
- "Five Windows" (2024)
- Safe (2024)

=== Singles ===
With Mr. Gabriel

- "Holy Water" (2017)
- "Starlight" (2017) with Jai Wolf
- "Help Me Out" (2017)
- "Millennial Falcon" (2018)
- "Tambourine" (2018)
- "Civilized" (unreleased)

=== Other credits ===
- With Mark Foster, Stephan Altman, and Peter Barbee: "When You Find Love" (2015) for Little Boy; co-artist
- With Elephant Castle: "I’m a Loser" and "Life in Outer Space" (2020); drums credit
- Original music for the podcast Awakening OD by Jessa Reed (2020)
