= Houdini (Foster the People song) =

2012 single by Foster the People

Single by Foster the People

from the album Torches
- Released: May 15, 2012
- Recorded: 2010
- Genre: Indie pop; alternative dance; synth-pop
- Length: 3:20
- Label: Columbia; Startime
- Songwriter: Mark Foster
- Producers: Rich Costey; Mark Foster

Foster the People singles chronology
"Don't Stop (Color on the Walls)" (2012)	"Houdini" (2012)	"Coming of Age" (2014)

"Houdini" is a song by American indie pop band Foster the People from their debut studio album Torches. Written by the group's frontman Mark Foster, the song was first released as a promotional single exclusively in the United Kingdom on April 1, 2011. The song was released as the album's fifth single on May 15, 2012. It is featured on the soundtracks for video games SSX and Sackboy: A Big Adventure and in the episode "Yes, Then Zero" of Gossip Girl. The song appeared in the 2012 film LOL. It also appeared in the TV shows Awkward and Suits.

== Writing and recording ==
"Houdini" was written by the group's frontman Mark Foster while he was working as a commercial jingle writer at Mophonics. While showing his then-girlfriend the offices on a so-called "take-your-girlfriend-to-work-day", Foster demonstrated how he wrote songs, putting a simple drum beat and vocal sample together in 10 minutes. Four days later, he revisited the composition and began adding piano chords. Reflecting on the song, he described his then-girlfriend as a "good muse".

== Live performances ==
The band performed "Houdini", as well as "Pumped Up Kicks", on Saturday Night Live on October 8, 2011, which was hosted by Ben Stiller. American saxophonist Kenny G guested on the performance of "Houdini". Foster the People performed the song on Late Show with David Letterman on October 27, 2011, along with "Pumped Up Kicks", "Helena Beat", "Call It What You Want", "Don't Stop (Color on the Walls)", "I Would Do Anything for You", "Miss You" and "Life on the Nickel".

== In other media ==
The song appears in the soundtrack of the 2012 video game SSX.

== Music video ==
The music video for "Houdini" premiered on YouTube on April 26, 2012, directed by Daniel Kwan and Daniel Scheinert. James Mackey guest stars as the paramedic.

=== Synopsis ===
The band (Mark Foster, Mark Pontius, Jacob Fink) is filming a music video in the studio when a lighting rig falls on them. A paramedic arrives and declares them dead, devastating the crew as the band had a concert scheduled the following day. A crew member calls someone he knows, a fixer, to help. The fixer arrives and his assistants take over. The assistants, dressed completely in black, stand behind the band members and move their limbs. The video crew is doubtful, but after a change in lighting and background that effectively hides the assistants, they are convinced that the fixer's plan will work. Together, the assistants and crew prepare for the band's concert. Electronic controls are added to the faces of the band members, and now the illusion that they are alive is complete. The concert is a huge success, and the music video ends with the crew members partying backstage in front of the lifeless bodies of the band.

== Awards and nominations ==
This music video was nominated for the 55th Annual Grammy Awards award for Best Short Form Music Video.

== Track listing ==
- Digital download
1. "Houdini" – 3:20

== Personnel ==
- Mark Foster – vocals, piano, synthesizer, percussion, programming
- Gary Grant – trumpet
- Mark Pontius – drums
- Cubbie Fink – bass

== Charts ==
Chart (2011–2012)	Peak position
Canada Rock (Billboard)	21
Japan Hot 100 (Billboard)	70
Netherlands (Single Top 100)	98
US Alternative Airplay (Billboard)	37

== Certifications ==
Region	Certification	Certified units/sales
New Zealand (RMNZ)	Gold	15,000^{‡}
United States (RIAA)	Platinum	1,000,000^{‡}
^{‡} Sales+streaming figures based on certification alone.

== Release history ==
Country	Date	Format	Label
United Kingdom	April 1, 2011	Digital download	Columbia
United States	May 15, 2012	Alternative radio	Startime; Columbia
