= Digital Revolution Studios =

High-definition stereoscopic digital 3D

- Type: Private
- Industry: Entertainment
- Headquarters: Van Nuys, California, U.S.
- Key people: Craig Tanner, President; Gina Tanner, CEO; Wayan Palmieri, CTO
- Number of employees: 14
- Website: digitalrevolutionstudios.com

Digital Revolution Studios is a Van Nuys, California based company specializing in high-definition stereoscopic digital 3D. Digital Revolution Studios was started by Oscar nominated and Emmy winning producer Craig Tanner, who gained a reputation in the stereoscopic industry for his work as Visual Effects Editor of the landmark 3D film, Avatar.

== Notable Productions ==
Due partially to the company's early involvement in the new medium of 3D television programming, including a number of shows made for 3net the first 24-hour 3D channel, Digital Revolution Studios achieved a number of "firsts" with their productions.

- In September 2010, Digital Revolution Studios filmed Bullproof, the very first docu-reality TV series shot in native 3D. The show follows four American bullfighters both inside and outside of the bull riding arena. It was broadcast on 3net 3D channel in May 2011.
- In February 2011, 3ality Digital & Digital Revolution Studios produced the 2011 3D Creative Arts Awards: "Your World in 3D", which was the first televised award show filmed in native 3D. The production was filmed at the Grauman's Chinese Theatre in Hollywood and televised on 3net 3D channel.
- In December 2011, Digital Revolution Studios released the first Mixed Martial Arts 3D TV series, "BAMMA USA: MMA Fight Night," focusing its attention on the quickly growing sport.
- In December 2011, the indie-rock band Foster the People teamed up with Digital Revolution Studios to produce the 3D music video for their hit song, "Don't Stop (Color on the Walls)." The video, featuring Precious star Gabourey Sidibe as an accidental getaway driver, was the first such music video created specifically for the glasses-free Nintendo 3DS game system. The video also features a cameo of Digital Revolution Studios' CEO Gina Tanner playing a distressed driver. At the 2012 3D Creative Arts Awards in Hollywood, The International 3D Society presented Digital Revolution Studios with a Lumiere Award for Best Television Short for the music video.

== Network TV shows ==
- Jillian's Travels (3net)
- "Bullproof" (3net)
- 2011 3D Creative Arts Awards "Your World in 3D" (3net)
- 3D Safari: Africa (3net)
- BAMMA USA: 3D FIGHTS MMA (3net)
- WWII Winners (3net)
- Moments in Asia (3net)
- Cold Blooded (3net)
- Big Horn Sheep - Anza Borrego: The Last Refuge (3net)

== Documentaries ==
- Humor and Heartache of War (2012)

== Music Videos ==
- Foster the People "Don't Stop"(2012)

== Awards ==
- Telly Award for 'Use of 3D' in the TV series "Bullproof"
- Telly Award for 'Use of 3D' in the Commercial' - Army Strong
- Telly Award for 'Use of 3D' in the Music Video' - Foster The People "Don't Stop"
- International 3D Society's Lumiere Award for Best TV Short for the music video "Don't Stop (Color on the Walls)" by Foster the People
