= Craig Tanner =

Craig Tanner may refer to:

- Craig Tanner (producer) (born 1974), American film director, film producer and editor
- Craig Tanner (footballer) (born 1994), English footballer
