= Wayan Palmieri =

American music video director, film editor and photographer

- Born: Wayan Blue Palmieri; January 31, 1977 (age 48); Legian, Bali, Indonesia
- Other names: Wayan Blue
- Occupations: Music video director; Film editor; Photographer
- Years active: 1999–present

Wayan Palmieri (born January 31, 1977) is an American music video director, film editor and photographer.

== Career ==
=== Feature and short films ===
As the Stereoscopic Supervisor and CTO of Digital Revolution Studios, Wayan assisted in the creation of the 3D post production workflow with Craig Tanner.

== Work ==
=== Filmography ===
| Year | Title | Role |
|---|---|---|
| 2013 | Mysteries of the Unseen World | VFX Editor / Assistant Editor / Stereoscopic Editor |
| 2014 | Sweetheart | Editor |
| 2014 | Transformers: Age of Extinction | Asst. Stereoscopic Editor |
| 2015 | Terminator Genisys | Asst. Stereoscopic Editor |
| 2015 | Insurgent | Stereoscopic Editor |
| 2015 | Bambaata Marley 'Waiting for the War' | Director / Editor |
| 2016 | Captain America: Civil War | Stereoscopic Editor |
| 2016 | Dr. Strange | Stereoscopic Editor |
| 2017 | Bambaata Marley 'Unconditional' | Director / Editor |
| 2017 | Guardians of the Galaxy Vol. 2 | Stereoscopic Editor |
| 2017 | Spider-Man: Homecoming | Stereoscopic Editor |
| 2017 | Thor: Ragnarok | Stereoscopic Editor |
| 2018 | Black Panther | Stereoscopic Editor |
| 2018 | Avengers: Infinity War | Stereoscopic Editor |
| 2018 | Bambaata Marley 'Deadbeat' | Director / Editor |
| 2018 | Ant-Man and the Wasp | Stereoscopic Editor |
| 2019 | Captain Marvel | Stereoscopic Editor |
| 2020 | Bambaata Marley 'Endlessly' | Director / Editor |
| 2020 | Bambaata Marley 'Beyond' | Director |
| 2021 | Black Widow | Stereoscopic Editor |
| 2024 | The Private Eye | Editor |

=== Awards and nominations ===
- 2011, Telly Award for 'Best Use of 3D' in the TV series "Bullproof"
- 2012, Telly Award for 'Best Use of 3D' in the Commercial' – Army Strong
- 2012, Telly Award for 'Best Use of 3D' in the Music Video' – Foster The People "Don't Stop"
- 2017: Telly Award for 'Best Online Music Video' – Bambaata Marley "Waiting for the War"
- 2017: Telly Award for 'Directing' – Bambaata Marley "Waiting for the War"
- 2018: Telly Award for 'Best Online Music Video' – Bambaata Marley "Unconditional"
