= Jonathan Wang =

Taiwanese-American film producer

- Born: November 28, 1984 (age 41); Dallas, Texas, U.S.
- Occupations: film producer; music video producer
- Years active: 2011–present
- Works: Swiss Army Man; Everything Everywhere All At Once; The Legend of Ochi
- Spouse: Anni A Sternisko (m. 2022)

Chinese name
- Traditional Chinese: 王慶
- Hanyu Pinyin: wáng qìng

Jonathan Wang (Chinese: 王慶; pinyin: wáng qìng; born November 28, 1984) is a Taiwanese-American film producer best known for Swiss Army Man (2016) and Everything Everywhere All at Once (2022). He is the long-time producing collaborator of the director duo known as the Daniels (Daniel Scheinert and Daniel Kwan). Wang began his career in music video production and later pivoted to feature films with his debut feature Swiss Army Man, which won the Sundance 2016 U.S. Dramatic Directing Award. Since then, he has produced multiple feature films, including Everything Everywhere All at Once, which has become A24's highest-grossing film of all time, and for which Wang won the Academy Award for Best Picture.

== Filmography ==
Feature films

- Swiss Army Man (2016)
- The Death of Dick Long (2019)
- False Positive (2021)
- Everything Everywhere All at Once (2022)
- The Legend of Ochi (2025)
- Untitled Daniels film (2027)

Short films

- Engine Block (2011)
- Plastiki and the Material of the Future (2011)
- I Have No Hold on You (2012)
- Possibilia (2014)
- I Have No Hold on You (2014)
- Memory 2.0 (2014)

Music videos

- Joywave Feat. Kopps: "Tongues"
- DJ Snake and Lil Jon: "Turn Down for What"
- Passion Pit: "Cry Like a Ghost"
- David Guetta Feat. Ne-Yo & Akon: "Play Hard"
- Skrillex Feat. The Doors: "Breakn' a Sweat, Version 2"
- David Guetta feat. Sia: "She Wolf (Falling to Pieces)"
- Bob Dylan: "Duquesne Whistle"
- Foster the People: "Don't Stop (Color on the Walls)"
- Tenacious D: "Rize of the Fenix"
- Kimbra feat. Mark Foster & A-Trak: "Warrior"
- The Shins: "Simple Song"
- Battles Feat. Gary Numan: "My Machines"
- Lenny Kravitz: "Stand"

TV

- L.A. Rangers (2013)
- Mason (pre-production)

== Awards and nominations ==
- Academy Award for Best Picture (2023) – Everything Everywhere All at Once (won)
- BAFTA Award for Best Film (2023) – Everything Everywhere All at Once (nominated)
- Golden Globe Award for Best Motion Picture – Musical or Comedy (2023) – Everything Everywhere All at Once (nominated)
- Grammy Award for Best Music Video (2015) – "Turn Down for What" (nominated)
- Independent Spirit Award for Best Film (2023) – Everything Everywhere All at Once (won)
- Producers Guild of America Award for Best Theatrical Motion Picture (2023) – Everything Everywhere All at Once (won)
