= Oyster Yachts =

British brand of luxury cruising sailing yachts

- Type: Privately held
- Industry: Boat building
- Predecessor: Oyster Marine
- Founded: 1973
- Founder: Richard Matthews
- Headquarters: Southampton, United Kingdom
- Key people: Ashley Highfield (CEO), Richard Hadida (Chairman)
- Products: Sailing Yachts
- Services: New yachts, yacht brokerage, yacht charter
- Website: www.oysteryachts.com

Oyster Yachts (formerly Oyster Marine) is a British brand of luxury cruising sailing yachts established in 1973. The company is based in Southampton but with foundation and ongoing strong links to Wroxham and Ipswich.

== History ==
=== Founding ===
In 1973 Richard Matthews founded Oyster Marine and commissioned the 32 ft prototype three quarter tonner sailing yacht UFO II, designed by British Naval Architects Holman and Pye and built by Norfolk based boatbuilder, Landamores. UFO won the Royal Yacht Squadron's de Maas Cup at Cowes in 1974. The design was developed into the UFO 34, and this became the first yacht to be produced by Oyster Marine.

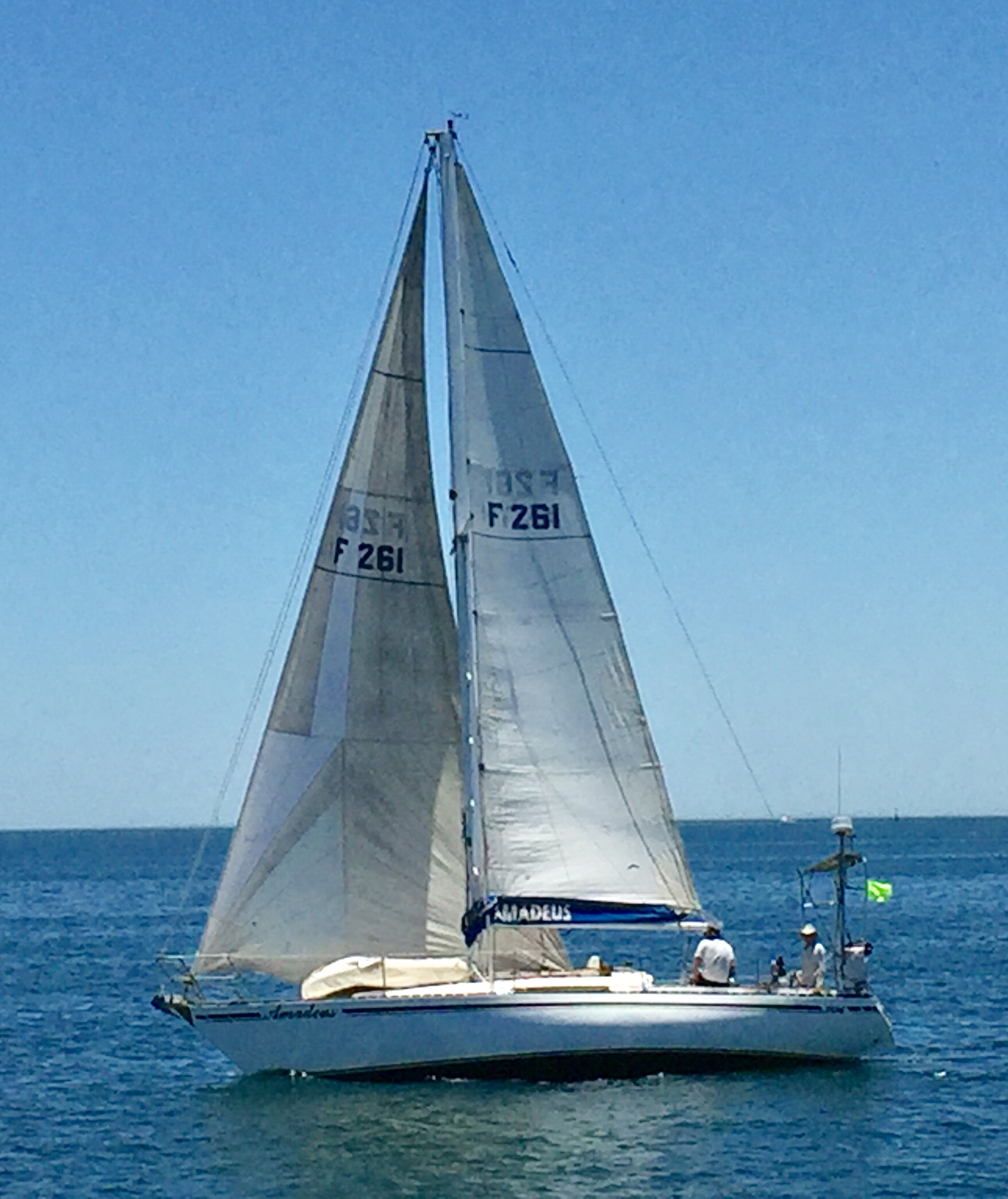
UFO 34 the first yacht produced by Oyster Marine

=== Design ===
In 1978 Oyster Marine introduced a 46 ft cruising ketch designed by Holman & Pye, pioneering the Deck Saloon feature that has since become the company's trademark. Oyster continued to increase the size of its vessels, launching a 53 ft design by Rob Humphreys in 1997 followed by a 62 ft Humphreys' design in 2002. Today, Oyster Yachts builds sailboats ranging from 56 ft to 125 ft, all designed by Rob Humphreys and the Oyster Design Team.

=== British Manufacture ===
Even during the company’s beginnings, when a lot of its boat building was subcontracted out, production was always awarded to other British yards. The most notable of these were Landamores in Hoveton (Wroxham) who were responsible for the majority of Oysters produced.

Only a couple of models in the company’s history have ever been built outside the UK. These are the Oyster 49, Oyster 54 and LD43 parts of the production run was produced in New Zealand by McDell Marine and the 100 ft and 125 ft yachts designed by Ed Dubois built at RMK Marine in Turkey.

Oyster have moved from being a marketing company which it was for the majority of its history, to taking assembly in-house in 2000s and in 2019 it took the final step in this process taking hull moulding in-house in a partnership with Lloyds Register.

=== Ownership, Administration and Acquisition ===
In 2008 the company was sold to private equity house Balmoral Capital in 2008 for around £70m who then sold it in 2012 to Dutch private equity firm HTP Investments BV for around £15m.

On 5 February 2018, Oyster Marine, the boat-building arm of the Oyster group (which also includes Oyster Brokerage and Oyster Charter) went into administration.

In July 2015, there was a failure of the internal hull structure of an Oyster 825 "Polina Star III". An investigation found the manufacturing process of the inner structure of the Oyster 825 led to the vessel sinking. Following the successful launch of several new models the company closed at the end of 2017 due to cash flow issues. The then owner, Dutch Private Equity owner H.T.P. Investments BV withdrew their support, leaving the directors with no alternative but to appoint Administrators.

KPMG was appointed as administrator to Oyster Marine Holdings (the holding company for Oyster Yachts) on 7 February 2018.

On 20 March 2018, British tech entrepreneur and founder of Evolution Gaming Group Richard Hadida acquired Oyster Yachts in its entirety. Hadida began re-employing many previous employees of Oyster Yachts. The Oyster Board consists of Hadida and CFO Becky Bridgen together with Non-Executives Ashley Highfield (Senior Independent Director), Eddie Jordan, Ivan Ritossa and Rob Humphreys.

== Reinvestment and Growth ==
Under Hadida’s ownership the company restarted manufacturing in its Wroxham yard on 15 May 2018, beginning to fulfil the contracts that Oyster held before it entered administration. This included rehiring 50 of Oyster’s former shipwrights.

== Awards and recognition ==
The company has twice been awarded the Queen’s Award for Enterprise. In 2012 the Oyster 625 was named the Luxury Cruiser of the Year at the boot Düsseldorf, while the Oyster 100-01 was given the Judge's Commendation for yachts under 40 m at the World Superyacht Awards in Istanbul.

In 2016, the Oyster 675 was voted Sailing Today’s Best Luxury Cruiser, with the Oyster 565 the same award in 2017. Then, in 2018, the Oyster 745 was named Cruising World’s Boat of the Year.

Oyster Yachts was featured in the American documentary series Building the Brand in 2011, which looked at the production processes behind iconic brands. Other companies featured include Gibson Guitars and Rolls-Royce.

== Oyster World Rally ==
The Oyster World Rally refers to the 2-3 year worldwide sailing expeditions that Oyster Yachts organises for its owners. All owners of the company’s yachts are invited to sail the world together, following a route pre-planned and organised by Oyster and with support from the Oyster After Sales team.

The rally was initially organised to celebrate 35 years of Oyster Yachts in 2013, but with the success of the first event the company decided to make the World Rally a regular feature in the Oyster social calendar. The first rally ran from 2013-14, then another from 2017-19, 2021-23 and the most recent started in January 2024. The next rally is planned to run from 2028-2029.

Oyster is the only yachting brand currently running its own global circumnavigation.

In the fall of 2025, Oyster also launched the Explorers Club, where Oyster yacht owners can participate in curated rallies organized by the company. These rallies range in duration from four months to twelve months - considerably shorter than the 16 month World Rally.

== Owner Events ==
Oyster puts on regular regattas, dinners and other events for their community. These events are run by the Oyster Yachts Event team and generally this include two regattas per year - the Oyster Antigua Regatta in the Caribbean at Easter and the Oyster Palma Regatta one in the Mediterranean in September/October - as well as parties and dinners for owners during the London, Southampton and Annapolis boat shows and other sailing events. Another popular event on the Oyster Yachts event calendar is the Oyster Rendezvous which takes place every summer in the Mediterranean.

== Models ==
=== Sailing Yachts ===
Current and previous Oyster yacht models are listed below, with current models in bold:

Model	Years	Designer	Built	Notes
UFO 34 (yacht)	1974-19XX	Holman and Pye	+100	Aft Cockpit Cruiser/Racer
Oyster 26	1978–1981	Holman and Pye	47	Aft Cockpit Cruiser/Racer
SJ35	1983-1985	Stephen Jones	27	IOR ¾ Tonner
Oyster Mariner 35	1979-1982	Holman and Pye	20	Centre Cockpit Ketch
Oyster Heritage 37	1984-1989	Holman and Pye	32	Coachroof or Pilot House
Oyster 37		Holman and Pye		IOR One Tonner
Oyster Lightwave 395	1988-1990	Carl Schumacher	31	
Oyster 39	1978-1984	Holman and Pye	43	Centre Cockpit Ketch
Oyster 406	1986-1990	Holman and Pye	35	Deck Salon and Coachroof versions
Oyster SJ41	1980-1987	Stephen Jones	33	IOR One Tonner
Oyster 42	1996-2002		7	Aft Cockpit Deck Salon
SJ43	1981	Stephen Jones		
Oyster 435	1983-1995	Holman and Pye		Ketch and Cutter
Oyster 45	1996-2004	Holman and Pye	23	
Oyster HP46	1981-1990	Holman and Pye	25	Ketch and Sloop Versions
Oyster 46	2005-2012	Rob Humphreys	29	
Oyster 47	2000-2004	Holman and Pye	13	Modified Oyster 45
Oyster 475	2012-2019	Rob Humphreys	7	
Oyster 48 Lightwave	1987-1991	Carl Schumacher	19	
Oyster HP49 Pilot House	1991-1997	Holman & Pye	9	
Oyster 485	1994 - 2002	Holman & Pye	36	
Oyster 49	2001-2007	Rob Humphreys	15	
**Oyster 495**	**2022 – present**	**Rob Humphreys**		**>17**
Oyster 53	1999-2008	Rob Humphreys	52	Later boats built in New Zealand by McDell
Oyster 54	2008-2013	Rob Humphreys	21	
Oyster 545	2014-2016	Rob Humphreys	Approx. 8	Restyled 54
Oyster HP53/55	1986-19XX	Holman & Pye	49	3 Ketches; Approx. 46 Sloops
Oyster 56	1998-2010	Rob Humphreys	75	
**Oyster 565**	**2019 – present**	**Rob Humphreys**		**>3**
Oyster 575	2011-2018	Rob Humphreys	46	
**Oyster 595**	**2019–Present**	**Rob Humphreys**		**>10**
Oyster 61	1995-2000	Holman and Pye	14	
Oyster 62	1997-2010	Rob Humphreys	22	
Oyster 625	2011 - 2019	Rob Humphreys	21	
Oyster 655	2007 - 2010	Rob Humphreys	17	
Oyster 665	2014	Rob Humphreys	1	A 655 Custom
Oyster 66	2000 - 2005	Rob Humphreys	13	
**Oyster 675**	**2017 – present**	**Rob Humphreys**	3	
Oyster 68		Holman and Pye	10?	2 produced as Sail Training Vessels (see below)
Oyster HP68				
Oyster 70	1996-1999		4	
Oyster 72		Rob Humphreys		
Oyster 725		Rob Humphreys	3	
**Oyster 745**	**2018 – present**	**Rob Humphreys**	**>3**	
Oyster 80			2	
Oyster 82		Rob Humphreys	18	
Oyster 825	2002-2017	Rob Humphreys	7	Deck Saloon and Raised Saloon
Oyster 885	2o12-2019	Rob Humphreys	10	
**Oyster 885 Series 2**	**2019 – present**			**Referred to initially as the 895**
Oyster 100	2010-2012	Ed Dubois	3	Built by RMK Marine in Turkey
**Oyster 1225**	**2018 – 2019**	**Rob Humphries**	**>1**	Built by Oyster and Pendennis Shipyards
Oyster 125	2013	Ed Dubois	1	Flybridge boat built by RMK Marine in Turkey

(CC = Centre Cockpit; AC = Aft Cockpit; RS = Raised Saloon; DH = Deck House) (Current Oyster Models in bold)

=== Sail Training Boats ===
The majority of Oyster boats have been luxury cruisers, however Oyster has produced four sail training vessels:

- The Oyster 68 ketch RONA II, provided as a kit for completion by the then London Sailing Project - now Rona Sailing Project which sails out of Hamble
- The Oyster 68 ketch LORD RANK produced for the Ocean Youth Club. LORD RANK was lost, with no loss of life, during a delivery in June 2010 when she struck and sank on the Carrickmannon Rocks off Northern Ireland.
- The Oyster 80 ketch TEAM SPIRIT OF WIGHT produced for the Ocean Youth Club and subsequently sold to Gordonstoun School as OCEAN SPIRIT OF MORAY.
- The Oyster 70 ketch ALBA VENTURER, produced for the Ocean Youth Trust Scotland.

=== Motor Boats ===
Model	Years	Designer	Built	Notes
Powerline 390	1990-1991	John Bennett	11	Based on Humber 38 Hull
LD43 / OM43			20	
