= God Sleeps in Rwanda =

- Directed by: Kimberlee Acquaro; Stacy Sherman
- Narrated by: Rosario Dawson
- Edited by: Craig Tanner
- Distributed by: Women Make Movies
- Release date: 2005
- Running time: 28 minutes
- Countries: Rwanda; United States
- Languages: Kinyarwanda, Subtitled

God Sleeps in Rwanda is a 2005 documentary short subject about five women who were affected by the 1994 Rwandan genocide against the Tutsi ethnic group. After the genocide, women in Rwanda outnumbered men by 70%. Ten of thousands of women were victims of mutilation and/or rape. This spread HIV/AIDS among the female population. After the genocide ended, the women of Rwanda were faced with piecing together a new society that would go beyond what the country had been before the genocide.

This documentary looks at the lives of five women who reconstructed themselves, reorganized their contributions to society and thus brought hope and helped heal the wounds of those who were wounded. Among the people who are featured are an HIV-positive policewoman raising four children alone and attending night school to become a lawyer; a teenager who has become head of the household for her four siblings; and a young woman orphaned in her teens who is now the top development official in her area.

== Awards ==
God Sleeps in Rwanda was nominated for the Academy Award for Best Documentary Short Film in 2006. It lost to A Note of Triumph: The Golden Age of Norman Corwin.

It won the Best Documentary Emmy Award in 2007.

It also won or was nominated for:

Won:

- Outstanding Documentary - Short Format, Gracie Awards 2007
- Festival Award, Ojai Film Festival
- Audience Award, Palm Springs International Festival of Short Films 2005
- Critic's Choice Award, Jackson Hole Docuweek IDA 2004
- Jury Special Mention, Silverdocs Documentary Festival
- Audience Award, Silverdocs/AFI Film Festival
- Audience Award, Aspen Shortsfest 2005
- World Cinema Short Award, Phoenix Film Festival
- Best Documentary: Short Subject, Ashland Independent Film Festival 2006

Nominated:

- Pare Lorentz Award, International Documentary Association IDA 2004
- Best Independent Mini Doc, Black Reel Awards 2007

It was broadcast on the Cinemax documentary series Cinemax Reel Life.
