= Kimberlee Acquaro =

American filmmaker and photojournalist

- Occupations: Filmmaker; Photojournalist

Kimberlee Acquaro is an American filmmaker and photojournalist, an Academy Award nominee, Emmy award winner, Guggenheim Fellow in Film, Pew Fellow in International Journalism, and an International Reporting Project Fellow. She is the recipient of Otis College of Art and Design's LA Artist Residency and Otis’s Emerging Curator Fellowship. Acquaro works in a lens based practice at the intersection of visual journalism and contemporary art covering human and civil rights, racial and gender justice.

Her work has garnered international film festival awards and been featured on HBO, Cinemax, CNN, CBS, NPR, "The Tavis Smiley Show", "The Voice of America," BBC/PRI's "The World"; shown at The Museum of Modern Art in New York City, The Boston Museum of Fine Art, The California African American Museum, Harvard's Carr Center for Human Rights, The Museum of Contemporary Art in Santa Barbara, The Museum of Tolerance in Los Angeles, Sundance, The United States Holocaust Memorial Museum in Washington D.C., The Los Angeles LGBTQ Center, Advocate Gochis Gallery in Los Ángeles and the Robin Rice Gallery in New York City. Acquaro's journalism has appeared as cover stories in The New York Times Magazine, in The Washington Post Magazine, Time Magazine, U.S. News & World Report, Interview, Mother Jones, Art News and many international publications. She was awarded a prestigious Pew Fellowship in International Journalism and a Residency at Johns Hopkins School of Advanced International Studies in Washington DC for her work in Rwanda. She received a Guggenheim Fellowship in Film for her work documenting race in America through the eyes of African-Americans over the age of 100 in I'll Rise. Acquaro's practice has expanded to include visual art as collective action, public space art and socially engaged exhibitions.

Acquaro began her career as an intern for photographer Mary Ellen Mark and assistant to Eddie Adams. She worked as assistant to the director of photography at Life magazine then a photography editor at Time magazine and at U.S. News & World Report. She joined the staff at The Eddie Adams Workshop; has been a jurist at Visa Pour L'Image in Perpignan, France; a jurist for The International Documentary Association and for the Emmy Awards. She studied photography and earned her MFA at Maine Media College. Acquaro's work is represented by Women Make Movies.

== Awards ==
Emmy Award for Best Documentary

- International Reporting Project Fellow
- 2001 Pew Fellowship in International Journalism
- 2010 Guggenheim Fellowship
- SilverDocs Jury Award and Audience Award
- Aspen ShortsFest Audience Award
- Palm Springs ShortsFest Audience Award
- Urban Vibe Film Festival - Best Documentary Short

== Filmography ==
- 100 Years (2010)
- MissRepresentation
- God Sleeps in Rwanda (2005)

== Works ==
- "Out of Madness, A Matriarchy", Mother Jones, January/February 2003
- "The Girls Next Door" Sex Slaves on Main Street The New York Times Magazine January 2004
