= Building the Brand =

American television series

- Genre: Documentary
- Country of origin: United States
- Original language: English
- No. of seasons: 1
- No. of episodes: 10

Production
- Production location: Multiple
- Camera setup: Multiple
- Running time: 42 minutes

Original release
- Network: 3net
- Release: April 3 – July 26, 2011

Building the Brand is a ten-part American documentary television series which aired on the now-defunct 3net channel. Each episode visits a factory of a different brand. The series is produced in 3D. The series features the production process as well as interviews with key players at the business.

== Broadcast ==
The series premiered in the U.S. on April 3, 2011 on 3net where it was broadcast in 3D.

Internationally, the series premiered in Australia on Discovery Science on July 23, 2015.

Repeats of the series are currently airing on the digital broadcast network Quest.

== Episodes ==
- Episode 1: Winnebago
- Episode 2: Gibson Guitars
- Episode 3: Pierce Fire Trucks
- Episode 4: Chevrolet Corvette
- Episode 5: Apache Attack Helicopters
- Episode 6: Rolls-Royce
- Episode 7: Jack Daniel's
- Episode 8: John Deere
- Episode 9: Trek Bicycles
- Episode 10: Oyster Marine
