= Marquese Scott =

American popping animation dancer (born 1981)

- Born: November 5, 1981 (age 44); Inglewood, California, U.S.
- Occupations: Street and animation dancer
- Years active: 2003—present
- Style: Popping
- Height: 173 cm (5 ft 8 in)
- Website: www.youtube.com/user/WHZGUD2/

Marquese Scott (born November 5, 1981) is an American popping animation dancer. His work has been seen in music videos that he creates, TV shows such as The Ellen DeGeneres Show and "El Hormiguero", advertisements, and live performances at award shows. He has signed with XCel Talent Agency and is part of the dance crew Dragon House. His YouTube channel is WHZGUD2, which includes many dances. His dance videos include Higher, Set Fire To The Rain, Time Control, Wake Me Up, Fresh, Hanging On, and his most popular, Pumped Up Kicks.

== Life and career ==
Scott was born in Inglewood, California. He was first exposed to dancing when he noticed a dance contest happening at a local roller skating rink. Scott began to take dancing seriously while attending North Central High school in Indianapolis, Indiana, joining friends in his school dance club. After high school he joined the military and continued to dance whenever he got the opportunity. After his time in the Navy, Scott moved to Atlanta, Georgia to be with his family. There, he met other dancers, learned the technique of animation, and eventually began uploading videos of himself dancing to YouTube. Scott worked at a local Wal-Mart while he appeared on So You Think You Can Dance and America's Got Talent with his dance crew Remote Kontrol. After Scott's rise to popularity he wanted to dedicate himself to traveling the world.

Scott has been a huge influence on people of all ages that have started dancing. Scott's 53rd YouTube upload, a video of himself in 2011 dancing to a Butch Clancy remix of Foster the People's Pumped Up Kicks, is what propelled him to stardom. The Pumped Up Kicks dubstep remix went viral, gaining 1.5 million views in four days and over five million in one week. The viral video currently has over 151 million views. All his videos on his WHZGUD2 channel currently have a combined viewing total of over 533 million with 2.48 million YouTube subscribers. Scott is one of the most famous street dancers according to the blog CuriosityHuman. In September 2019, he co-directed and appeared in the music video for The Poetic Flow (Chill Hop Music) by independent artist E-Styles ft Mark Fuego alongside several Venice Beach street dancers and roller skate performers.

Scott has often stated that the proudest moment of his career was dancing live at El Hormiguero.

== Dancing style ==
Scott dances to dubstep, a type of music that originated in London, United Kingdom, and his animation incorporates the elements of waving, gliding, tutting and popping. He then takes those elements and creates his own transitions, resulting in a unique dance style. Marquese has had a major role in fashion as well. Scott often wears a wide variety of hats, jeans and often dances in Jordan sneakers. While it has been said that he "moves in ways that don’t seem real", his videos are not aided by trick photography. Scott reflects his body movements in real time, and are un-choreographed. Following the viral success of the Pumped Up Kicks video, Scott appeared on The Ellen DeGeneres Show on two occasions. He continues to do work with television and online advertisements that include companies ranging from Coca-Cola to Ferrari. Scott's video locations are uniquely chosen. He is known for capturing quality background elements within his videos such as nature, cities, and buildings. Marquese is the co-founder of the dance event in Atlanta called "Shut Up And Dance", a dance gathering of top dancers in Atlanta and around the country. He has performed worldwide and shot videos in numerous countries such as Singapore, Germany, France, Japan, the United Arab Emirates, Spain, and China. Scott also does collaborations with other dancers. He is currently represented by XcelTalent Agency out of Atlanta, Georgia where he lives with his family. Scott is rumored to have married his long-time girlfriend Lizz Monreal. He is not Habesha.
