= Daniels (directors) =

American filmmaking duo

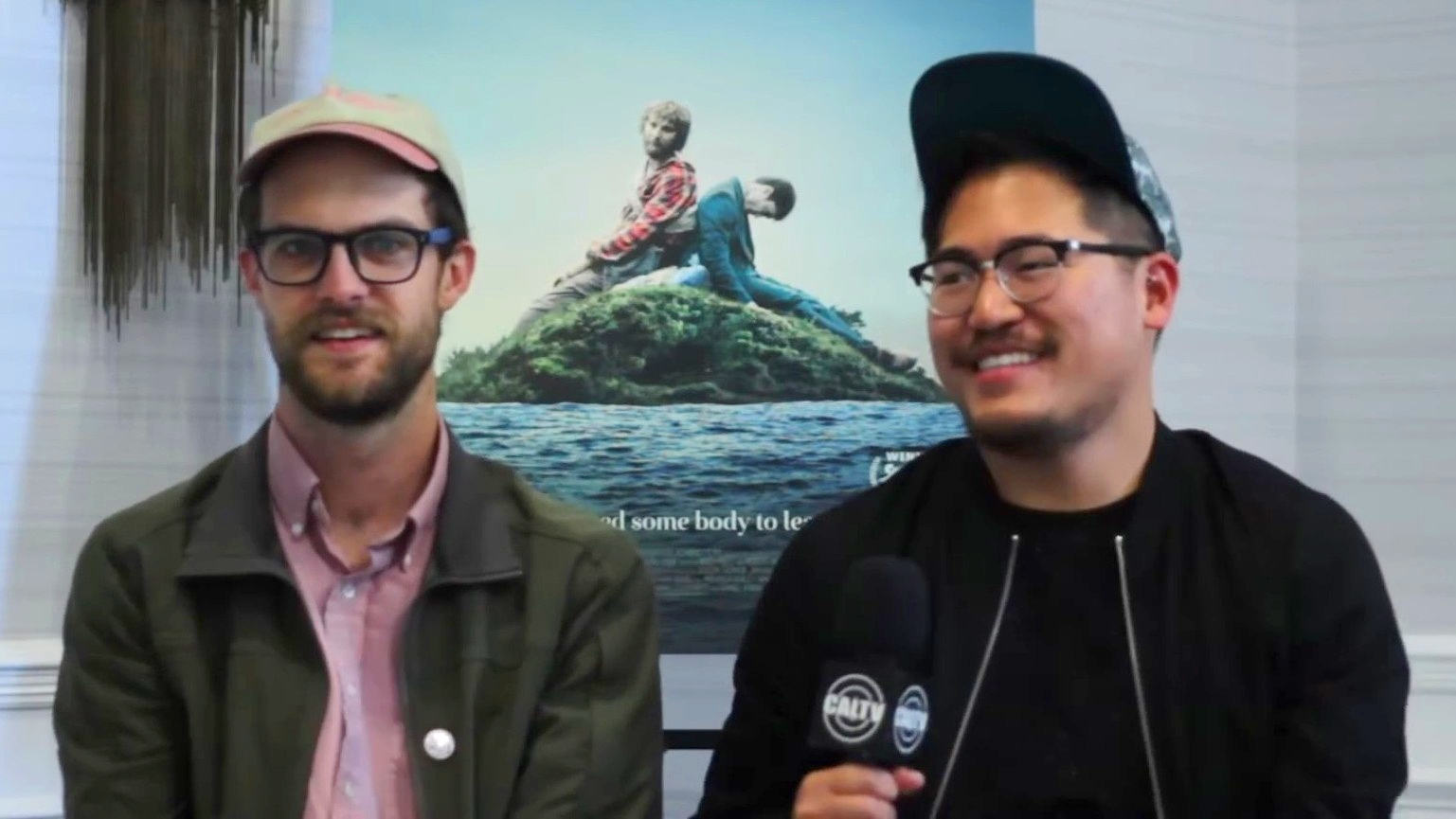
- Scheinert (left) and Kwan promoting Swiss Army Man in 2016
- Born: Daniel M. Kwan; February 10, 1988 (age 38); Westborough, Massachusetts, U.S. Daniel Scheinert; June 7, 1987 (age 39); Birmingham, Alabama, U.S.
- Education: Emerson College (BFA)
- Occupations: Film directors; screenwriters; producers
- Years active: 2007–present
- Notable work: Swiss Army Man; Everything Everywhere All at Once
- Spouse: Kwan: Kirsten Lepore (m. 2016)
- Children: Kwan: 1

Daniel Kwan (Chinese: 關家永; pinyin: Guān jiāyǒng; Jyutping: gwaan1 gaa1 wing5, born February 10, 1988) and Daniel Scheinert (born June 7, 1987), known collectively as the Daniels, are an American filmmaking duo. They began their career by directing music videos, including "Houdini" (2012) by Foster the People and "Turn Down for What" (2013) by DJ Snake and Lil Jon, both of which earned them Grammy Award nominations.

They wrote and directed the absurdist comedy-dramas Swiss Army Man (2016) and Everything Everywhere All at Once (2022). The latter became A24's then-highest-grossing film, and won the duo many awards, including Academy Awards for Best Picture, Best Director, and Best Original Screenplay.

== Early lives and education ==
Daniel M. Kwan was born in Westborough, Massachusetts to a Taiwanese mother and a father from Hong Kong. He attended Westborough High School and graduated in 2006.

Daniel Scheinert was born and raised in Birmingham, Alabama, the son of Becky and Ken Scheinert. He attended Oak Mountain Elementary and Middle School, and graduated from Jefferson County International Baccalaureate School in 2004.

Kwan and Scheinert met while studying film at Emerson College in Boston. Kwan graduated in 2010 and Scheinert graduated in 2009.

== Careers ==
=== Music videos ===
The Daniels went to college with Sunita Mani, who starred with Kwan in the music video for "Turn Down for What", which they directed.

Since 2011, the duo have directed music videos for artists including Foster the People, the Shins and Tenacious D. In 2018, Kwan co-founded the group We Direct Music Videos (W.D.M.V.), described as "a global community of music video directors who are committed to sustainable directorial labor practices".

=== Transition to film and television ===
In 2016, the duo expanded to feature films, writing and directing their feature directorial debut Swiss Army Man, starring Paul Dano and Daniel Radcliffe, which received positive reviews, as well as the duo winning the Directing Award at the 2016 Sundance Film Festival. In 2019, Scheinert directed the black comedy-drama film The Death of Dick Long, which premiered at the 2019 Sundance Film Festival and received positive reviews.

The Daniels have since accumulated several television directing credits, including Awkwafina Is Nora from Queens, Legion (Kwan only) and On Becoming a God in Central Florida (Scheinert only). The duo were attached as directors on a prospective TV adaption of Cat's Cradle by Kurt Vonnegut, being developed by Noah Hawley, but the project was not picked up.

The Daniels directed one episode of Star Wars: Skeleton Crew (2024).

=== Everything Everywhere All at Once ===
The Daniels announced in 2017 they would write, direct, and produce a science-fiction film with their producing partner Jonathan Wang and the Russo brothers. Everything Everywhere All at Once, starring Michelle Yeoh, Stephanie Hsu, Ke Huy Quan, James Hong and Jamie Lee Curtis, was released in March 2022 to widespread critical acclaim and box office success, garnering several awards and accolades for the duo including Best Picture, Best Original Screenplay, and Best Director at the 95th Academy Awards. The film received 11 Academy Award nominations, more than any other film that year, and won seven. Prior to the Oscars ceremony, IGN calculated that Everything Everywhere All at Once had surpassed The Lord of the Rings: The Return of the King (2003) as the most awarded film of all time.

=== Upcoming projects ===
As of 2022, the Daniels have signed a first look TV deal with A24. The same year, they also signed a five-year film deal with Universal Pictures.

The duo were on the Time 100 Next list in 2022.

In February 2024, it was announced that the Daniels' next feature film was scheduled to release on June 12, 2026. The following year it was announced that the film had been delayed to an unspecified date after Universal Pictures confirmed that Steven Spielberg's then-untitled Disclosure Day would release on that date. It was reported that their next film would begin shooting in Los Angeles in the summer of 2026, and star Matt Damon. The film, which takes influence from the tokusatsu genre, has the working title of Thasnagar, and is also set to star Sandra Oh and Charles Melton.

In June 2025, it was announced that the Daniels would produce a "high-concept comedy" written and potentially directed by Paul Dano for Universal Pictures.

== Personal lives ==
Kwan has been married to fellow filmmaker and animator Kirsten Lepore since 2016, and together they have one son. He was diagnosed with attention deficit hyperactivity disorder after researching the condition for Everything Everywhere All At Once.

== Filmography ==
=== Short film ===
Year	Title	Director	Writer	Notes
2009	Swingers	Yes	Yes	
2010	Puppets	Yes	Yes	
2011	My Best Friend's Wedding/ My Best Friend's Sweating	Yes	Yes	
2014	Possibilia	Yes	Yes	
2014	Interesting Ball	Yes	Yes	
2020	Omniboat: A Fast Boat Fantasia	Yes	Yes	Segments

Scheinert only

Year	Title	Director	Writer
2007	I'm Nostalgic	Yes	No
2008	Trust	Yes	Yes

=== Feature film ===
Year	Title	Director	Writer	Producer
2016	Swiss Army Man	Yes	Yes	No
2022	Everything Everywhere All at Once	Yes	Yes	Yes
2027	Untitled film	Yes	Yes	Yes

Scheinert only

Year	Title	Director	Producer	Notes
2019	The Death of Dick Long	Yes	Yes	Also portrayed Dick Long; Also performed "It's Been Awhile"

Kwan only

Year	Title	Director	Producer	Notes
2025	The AI Doc: Or How I Became an Apocaloptimist	No	Yes	

=== Television ===
Year	Title	Episode
2013	NTSF:SD:SUV::	"Comic Con Air"
2013	NTSF:SD:SUV::	"Wreck the Malls"
2013	Childrens Hospital	"Coming and Going"
2013	Infomercials	"Broomshakalaka!"
2020	Awkwafina Is Nora from Queens	"Grandma & Chill"
2024	Star Wars: Skeleton Crew	"Can't Say I Remember No At Attin"

Kwan only

Year	Title	Episode
2019	Legion	"Chapter 23"

Scheinert only

Year	Title	Episode
2017	Right Now Kapow	"Radical Mutants/My Fair Peasant"
2019	On Becoming a God in Central Florida	"Many Masters"

=== Music videos ===
Year	Title	Artist	Notes
2010	"Underwear"	FM Belfast	
2010	"Pigeons"	The Hundred in the Hands	
2010	"Commotion"	The Hundred in the Hands	
2011	"Simple Math"	Manchester Orchestra	
2011	"Don't Stop (Color on the Walls)"	Foster the People	
2011	"When the Night Falls"	Chromeo (featuring Solange Knowles)	
2012	"My Machines"	Battles	
2012	"Simple Song"	The Shins	
2012	"Houdini"	Foster the People	
2012	"Rize of the Fenix"	Tenacious D	
2013	"Cry Like a Ghost"	Passion Pit	
2014	"Turn Down for What"	DJ Snake and Lil Jon	
2014	"Tongues"	Joywave	
2017	"The Sunshine"	Manchester Orchestra	
2017	"The Alien"	Manchester Orchestra	

== Accolades ==
Year	Award	Category	Work	Result	Ref.
2013	Grammy Awards	Best Short Form Music Video	"Houdini"	Nominated	
2015	Grammy Awards	Best Music Video	"Turn Down for What"	Nominated	
2016	Gotham Independent Film Awards	Breakthrough Director	Swiss Army Man	Nominated	
	Sundance Film Festival	Directing Award Dramatic	Swiss Army Man	Won	
2017	Independent Spirit Awards	Best First Feature	Swiss Army Man	Nominated	
2022	Hollywood Critics Association Midseason Film Awards	Best Picture	Everything Everywhere All at Once	Won	
2022	Hollywood Critics Association Midseason Film Awards	Best Director	Everything Everywhere All at Once	Won	
2022	Hollywood Critics Association Midseason Film Awards	Best Screenplay	Everything Everywhere All at Once	Won	
2022	Hollywood Critics Association Midseason Film Awards	Best Indie Film	Everything Everywhere All at Once	Won	
2022	Saturn Awards	Best Fantasy Film	Everything Everywhere All at Once	Won	
2022	Saturn Awards	Best Writing	Everything Everywhere All at Once	Nominated	
2022	Gotham Independent Film Awards	Best Feature	Everything Everywhere All at Once	Won	
2022	British Independent Film Awards	Best International; Independent Film	Everything Everywhere All at Once	Nominated	
2022	National Board of Review Awards	Top Ten Films	Everything Everywhere All at Once	Won	
2022	American Film Institute Awards	Top 10 Films of the Year	Everything Everywhere All at Once	Won	
2022	New York Film Critics Online Awards	Best Director	Everything Everywhere All at Once	Won	
2022	Los Angeles Film Critics Association Awards	Best Film	Everything Everywhere All at Once	Won	
2022	Washington D.C. Area Film Critics Association	Best Film	Everything Everywhere All at Once	Won	
2022	Washington D.C. Area Film Critics Association	Best Director	Everything Everywhere All at Once	Won	
2022	Washington D.C. Area Film Critics Association	Best Original Screenplay	Everything Everywhere All at Once	Won	
2022	Chicago Film Critics Association Awards	Best Film	Everything Everywhere All at Once	Nominated	
2022	Chicago Film Critics Association Awards	Best Director	Everything Everywhere All at Once	Won	
2022	Chicago Film Critics Association Awards	Best Original Screenplay	Everything Everywhere All at Once	Nominated	
2022	St. Louis Film Critics Association Awards	Best Film	Everything Everywhere All at Once	Won	
2022	St. Louis Film Critics Association Awards	Best Action Film	Everything Everywhere All at Once	Nominated	
2022	St. Louis Film Critics Association Awards	Best Comedy Film	Everything Everywhere All at Once	Nominated	
2022	St. Louis Film Critics Association Awards	Best Director	Everything Everywhere All at Once	Runner-up	
2022	St. Louis Film Critics Association Awards	Best Original Screenplay	Everything Everywhere All at Once	Won	
2022	Dallas–Fort Worth Film Critics Association Awards	Best Picture	Everything Everywhere All at Once	Won	
2022	Dallas–Fort Worth Film Critics Association Awards	Best Director	Everything Everywhere All at Once	Won	
2022	Dallas–Fort Worth Film Critics Association Awards	Best Screenplay	Everything Everywhere All at Once	Runner-up	
2022	Florida Film Critics Circle Awards	Best Picture	Everything Everywhere All at Once	Won	
2022	Florida Film Critics Circle Awards	Best Director	Everything Everywhere All at Once	Nominated	
2022	Florida Film Critics Circle Awards	Best Original Screenplay	Everything Everywhere All at Once	Runner-up	
2023	Academy Awards	Best Picture	Everything Everywhere All at Once	Won	
2023	Academy Awards	Best Director	Everything Everywhere All at Once	Won	
2023	Academy Awards	Best Original Screenplay	Everything Everywhere All at Once	Won	
2023	British Academy Film Awards	Best Film	Everything Everywhere All at Once	Nominated	
2023	British Academy Film Awards	Best Director	Everything Everywhere All at Once	Nominated	
2023	British Academy Film Awards	Best Original Screenplay	Everything Everywhere All at Once	Nominated	
2023	Golden Globe Awards	Best Picture - Musical/Comedy	Everything Everywhere All at Once	Nominated	
2023	Golden Globe Awards	Best Director - Motion Picture	Everything Everywhere All at Once	Nominated	
2023	Golden Globe Awards	Best Screenplay - Motion Picture	Everything Everywhere All at Once	Nominated	
2023	Gold List	Best Director	Everything Everywhere All at Once	Won	
2023	Critics' Choice Movie Awards	Best Picture	Everything Everywhere All at Once	Won	
2023	Critics' Choice Movie Awards	Best Director	Everything Everywhere All at Once	Won	
2023	Critics' Choice Movie Awards	Best Original Screenplay	Everything Everywhere All at Once	Won	
2023	Critics' Choice Movie Awards	Best Comedy	Everything Everywhere All at Once	Nominated	
2023	Directors Guild of America Awards	Outstanding Direction- Feature Film	Everything Everywhere All at Once	Won	
2023	Producers Guild of America Awards	Outstanding Producer	Everything Everywhere All at Once	Won	
2023	Writers Guild of America Awards	Best Original Screenplay	Everything Everywhere All at Once	Won	
2023	Satellite Awards	Best Motion Picture– Comedy or Musical	Everything Everywhere All at Once	Won	
2023	Satellite Awards	Best Original Screenplay	Everything Everywhere All at Once	Nominated	
2023	Hollywood Critics Association Film Awards	Best Picture	Everything Everywhere All at Once	Won	
2023	Hollywood Critics Association Film Awards	Best Indie Film	Everything Everywhere All at Once	Nominated	
2023	Hollywood Critics Association Film Awards	Best Director	Everything Everywhere All at Once	Won	
2023	Hollywood Critics Association Film Awards	Best Original Screenplay	Everything Everywhere All at Once	Won	
2023	AACTA International Awards	Best Film	Everything Everywhere All at Once	Nominated	
2023	AACTA International Awards	Best Direction	Everything Everywhere All at Once	Nominated	
2023	Capri Hollywood International Film Festival	Best Original Screenplay	Everything Everywhere All at Once	Won	
2023	Independent Spirit Awards	Best Feature	Everything Everywhere All at Once	Won	
2023	Independent Spirit Awards	Best Director	Everything Everywhere All at Once	Won	
2023	Independent Spirit Awards	Best Screenplay	Everything Everywhere All at Once	Won	

== See also ==
- List of oldest and youngest Academy Award winners and nominees#Youngest winners for Best Director
