= The Death of Dick Long =

2019 film by Daniel Scheinert

- Theatrical release poster
- Directed by: Daniel Scheinert
- Written by: Billy Chew
- Produced by: Jonathan Wang; Daniel Scheinert; Melodie Sisk
- Starring: Michael Abbott Jr.; Virginia Newcomb; Andre Hyland; Sarah Baker; Jess Weixler; Roy Wood Jr.; Sunita Mani
- Cinematography: Ashley Connor
- Edited by: Paul Rogers
- Music by: Andy Hull; Robert McDowell
- Production company: A24
- Distributed by: A24
- Release dates: January 26, 2019 (Sundance); September 27, 2019 (United States)
- Running time: 100 minutes
- Country: United States
- Language: English
- Box office: $36,856

The Death of Dick Long is a 2019 American black comedy–drama film directed and produced by Daniel Scheinert. The film stars Michael Abbott Jr., Virginia Newcomb, Andre Hyland, Sarah Baker, Jess Weixler, Roy Wood Jr., and Sunita Mani. The story follows two men who try to cover-up the outlandish cause of their friend's death.

The Death of Dick Long premiered at the 2019 Sundance Film Festival on January 26, 2019. The film was released by A24 on September 27, 2019, to positive reviews.

== Plot ==
Friends Richard "Dick" Long, Ezekiel "Zeke" Olsen, and Earl Wyeth are spending time together late at night. When Dick sustains severe, unexplained injuries, Zeke and Earl drop his limp body in a hospital parking lot. Earl returns home and tells his girlfriend, Lake, that he has to leave town for a family emergency, but instead heads to his warehouse job. Zeke sneaks into bed, fooling his wife, Lydia, into thinking he has been asleep. When he agrees to drive their daughter Cynthia to school, he accidentally pulls out Dick's wallet--which he took from him just before Dick's body was discovered by an ER doctor, Dr. Richter. When Cynthia notices Dick's wallet, Zeke explains it is a "missing" wallet he found the night prior. Zeke puts Dick's driver's license on the kitchen counter. In the garage, he covers the blood-soaked back seat of his car with a blanket before Cynthia can see it.

Dr. Richter calls the police after Dick died of severe rectal hemorrhaging, believing him to have died after a violent sexual assault. When Zeke and Cynthia stop at a gas station, Cynthia tells a cop, Officer Dudley, about the "missing" wallet. Noticing Cynthia's romper is covered in Dick's blood, Zeke uses his body to hide it from Dudley while handing over the wallet. They return home after Zeke calls Earl for help. Earl takes Cynthia to school in his truck and speaks to Dick's widow, Jane, who is concerned about Dick's absence, but still knows nothing about the previous night's events. After discussing that Dick's genetic material would still be in the car, even after cleaning the blood out, Earl and Zeke dump the car in a river to hide the evidence.

Sheriff Spenser enlists Dudley to help her with the murder. Dudley finds out the wallet belongs to Richard Long because of a credit card in his wallet. When Zeke lies to Lydia about their car being stolen the night before, she calls the police. Dudley and Spenser arrive and briefly question her, learning that Zeke has a friend named Dick. They are interrupted when Dr. Richter calls the police and tells them horse semen was in Dick's rectum. After the police leave, Cynthia informs Lydia the car was not stolen the night prior because she in the "stolen" car that morning. Lydia confronts Zeke about the lying and he admits that Dick is dead, confessing the three of them had been participating in zoophilic acts for years. Dick died while raping with Zeke's horse, Comet. Lydia demands Zeke leave the house.

After briefly meeting with Earl to discuss the night's events, Zeke asks Earl to bring him back to his house. Upon returning to his house, he enters the stable where Comet lives and began brushing Comet whilst topless. Jane found Zeke in the stable and she asks if Dick is missing because he has been cheating on her, which Zeke denies. The two leave the barn after agreeing Jane should go home to find Dudley talking with Lydia on the porch. All four enter the house and talk in the dining room. Zeke attempts to stick with his stolen car story until Jane realizes that the wallet Dudley has is her husband's and the two attempt to confront Zeke about why he would not just give the wallet back to Dick or Jane. Zeke runs, but Dudley chases him to the stable. Lydia tells Jane to stay so she can recount what happened to her husband. Zeke lets Comet out of the stable and pleads for him to run away as Zeke is arrested by Dudley.

Dudley and Spenser visit the site of the dumped car. Dudley is shocked when Spenser mentions Zeke has been released. She explains the beastiality charges would ruin the lives of Lydia, Cynthia, and Jane if they continue with the case. Lydia intercepts Zeke after Cynthia's piano recital and cuts him from their lives. Zeke arrives at Earl and Lake's motel room that night--learning that Early never told Lake what happened to make him want to skip town. Zeke asks Earl what he will do next. Earl states he'll come up with something, and plays "How You Remind Me" on his guitar.

== Cast ==
- Michael Abbott Jr. as Ezekiel "Zeke" Olsen, a friend of Dick Long
- Virginia Newcomb as Lydia Olsen, Zeke's wife
- Andre Hyland as Earl Wyeth, Dick and Zeke's friend
- Sarah Baker as Officer Dudley, a relatively inexperienced police officer
- Jess Weixler as Jane Long, a schoolteacher and Dick's wife
- Roy Wood Jr. as Dr. Richter, the physician who discovers Dick
- Sunita Mani as Lake Travis, Earl's friend
- Poppy Cunningham as Cynthia Olsen, Lydia and Zeke's daughter
- Janelle Cochrane as Sheriff Spenser, Officer Dudley's superior and mentor
- Eugene Henry Jr. as Ted, a store clerk
- Daniel Scheinert as Dick Long

== Inspiring events ==
As the death of the titular character is due to internal injuries sustained from intercourse with a horse the film evokes a parallel to the real-life death of Kenneth Pinyan, an engineer who worked for Boeing and resided in Gig Harbor, Washington. Those events were widely reported by The Seattle Times as the Enumclaw horse sex case.

== Release ==
The Death of Dick Long premiered at the 2019 Sundance Film Festival on January 26, 2019. It was theatrically released by A24 in the United States on September 27, 2019. The film was theatrically released in Japan in the Summer of 2020 under the alternate title How Did Dick Long Die?

== Reception ==
=== Critical response ===
On review aggregator website Rotten Tomatoes, the film has an approval rating of 75% based on 79 reviews, with an average rating of 6.9/10. The site's critics consensus reads: "The Death of Dick Long mixes dark humor with provocative ideas to produce a sharp blend that's admittedly uneven but uniquely satisfying." On Metacritic, it has a weighted average score of 69 out of 100 based on 21 reviews, indicating "generally favorable reviews".

Writing for The A.V. Club, Ignatiy Vishnevetsky gave the film a B−, favorably comparing it to the absurdity and grotesqueness of Swiss Army Man, saying the tone "falls somewhere between irony and sincere fondness".
