= Untitled Daniels film =

Upcoming film by Daniel Kwan and Daniel Scheinert

- Directed by: Daniel Kwan; Daniel Scheinert
- Written by: Daniel Kwan; Daniel Scheinert
- Produced by: Daniel Kwan; Daniel Scheinert; Jonathan Wang
- Starring: Matt Damon; Sandra Oh; Charles Melton; Sean Kaufman; Michael Gandolfini; PinkPantheress; John Leguizamo
- Production company: Playgrounds
- Distributed by: Universal Pictures
- Release date: November 19, 2027
- Country: United States
- Language: English

Daniel Kwan and Daniel Scheinert, known professionally as Daniels, are writing and directing an upcoming American science fiction action comedy film. The film stars Matt Damon, Sandra Oh, Charles Melton, Sean Kaufman, Michael Gandolfini, PinkPantheress, and John Leguizamo.

It is scheduled to be released by Universal Pictures on November 19, 2027.

== Cast ==
- Matt Damon
- Sandra Oh
- Charles Melton
- Sean Kaufman
- Silvia Dionicio
- Jackson Kelly
- Kerrice Brooks
- Thalia Dudek
- Michael Gandolfini
- PinkPantheress
- John Leguizamo

== Production ==
=== Development and casting ===
After the success of their film Everything Everywhere All at Once (2022), Daniel Kwan and Daniel Scheinert, the filmmaking duo known professionally as Daniels, along with their producing partner Jonathan Wang, signed a first-look deal with Universal Pictures in August 2022. The team's first film under the deal was targeting a 2026 release. The film was awarded a California tax credit of $20.8 million to be produced in state, anticipating that it would generate $106.8 million for the state economy, with about $62 million in wages. Initially the film's narrative involved three timelines, which eventually was condensed into two which necessitated heavy rewrites that were partially responsible for delaying the production.

In March 2026, it was revealed that Ryan Gosling would be starring in the film, with production scheduled to begin later that summer in Los Angeles. In April 2026, it was announced that Gosling would be exiting the film, allegedly due to "scheduling conflicts". However, it was later reported that Gosling had also been unsatisfied with the supporting role he had been offered—the father of one of the teenage protagonists—as he felt it was not substantial enough and requested rewrites to make the part bigger, but his request was denied so he backed out. Jack Black reportedly was also considered for the part. In May 2026, Matt Damon was cast to replace Gosling. Damon's casting was confirmed the next month, with Sandra Oh, Charles Melton, Sean Kaufman, Silvia Dionicio, Jackson Kelly, Kerrice Brooks, Thalia Dudek and Michael Gandolfini also joining. In July, PinkPantheress (in her film acting debut) and John Leguizamo joined the cast. Damon later teased that "the way [the Daniels] pitched it to me was: if The Breakfast Club meets Inception meets an anime film meets an episode of The John Oliver Show that didn't get aired. So, if you liked Everything Everywhere All at Once and all the wildness and all the heart, I think you'll really like this one."

=== Filming ===
Principal photography began in Los Angeles by September 3, 2026, under the working title Thasnagar, with photos of Damon on set appearing online.

== Release ==
The film is scheduled to be released in the United States on November 19, 2027. It was originally scheduled to be released on June 12, 2026. However, in February 2025, the film was temporarily removed from the schedule, with Steven Spielberg's Disclosure Day taking its place, while it was also stated that the Daniels needed more time.
