= Whatmore (band) =

American hip-hop group

- Origin: New York City, New York, U.S.
- Genres: Hip-hop; indie pop; jazz; alternative indie
- Years active: 2024–present
- Label: Alta Music Group
- Members: Cisco Swank; Yoshi T. Jackson August; Sebastiano; Elijah Judah

Whatmore (stylized in all caps) is an American hip-hop group from New York City, New York, formed in 2024. The group consists of Cisco Swank, Yoshi T., Jackson August, Sebastiano, and Elijah Judah.

== History ==
The members of the band first met as freshmen at LaGuardia High School in Manhattan, New York City. Following high school, the members pursued solo projects and often collaborated on each other's work. The group officially formed in 2024 following a performance by member Cisco Swank at Baby's All Right in Williamsburg; Cisco did not want to perform, so he invited the other members to perform with him. The group began releasing music on Bandcamp with the series Flips, featuring reimagined versions of songs from artists including Mac Miller, SZA, Phoebe Bridgers, and more. They also began performing DIY shows across Brooklyn and Downtown Manhattan.

Whatmore released their debut single "Eastside w My Dogs" in June 2025. The following month, they released their second single "Chicken Shop Date". In August, they released the alternative rock single "Go!". Whatmore's self-titled debut album was released in October 2025. In March 2026 they released the two singles “Still Loiteringgg” and “2000s Pop Punk Rnb”. They later released a music video for “2000s Pop Punk Rnb” starring actors Sean Kaufman and Avantika. They also announced their first world tour. In April, they performed at Coachella 2026.

== Public image ==
The New York Times featured Whatmore in 'The Fall's Most Anticipated Albums: 10 Picks' and Ones to Watch included Whatmore in their Top 30 Artists to Watch in 2026 list. Prior to their debut album, the group garnered a large following on social media, with snippets of their music going viral on TikTok. The group described themselves and their sound as "very New York".

== Artistry ==
Whatmore's music has been described as "genre-bending", with influences of hip-hop, pop, jazz, and alternative indie. The group has been compared to other hip-hop collectives such as Brockhampton and Odd Future. Some of Whatmore's inspirations include The Beatles, Miles Davis' Second Great Quintet, Arctic Monkeys, The Jackson 5, A Tribe Called Quest, and Pro Era.

== Members ==
Current members

- Cisco Swank – vocals, production (2024–present)
- Yoshi T. – vocals, production (2024–present)
- Jackson August – vocals, production (2024–present)
- Sebastiano – vocals, production (2024–present)
- Elijah Judah – production (2024–present)

== Discography ==
=== Albums ===
Title	Details
Whatmore	Released: October 17, 2025; Label: Alta Music Group; Format: Digital download, CD

=== Digital albums ===
Title	Details
Flips	Released: February 23, 2025; Format: Digital download
Flips 2	Released: April 16, 2025; Format: Digital download

=== Singles ===
Title	Year	Album
"Eastside w My Dogs"	2025	Whatmore
"Chicken Shop Date"	2025	Whatmore
"Go!"	2025	Whatmore
"Jenny's"	2025	Whatmore
"Bombay (Keep It Alive)"	2025	Whatmore
"Still Loiteringgg"	2026	Non-album singles
"2000s Pop Punk Rnb"	2026	Non-album singles

=== Music videos ===
Title	Year	Director(s)	Ref.
"Eastside w My Dogs"	2025	Jackson August and Patrick Linehan	
"Chicken Shop Date"	2025	Jackson August and Patrick Linehan	
"Go!"	2025	Jackson August and Patrick Linehan	
"Jenny's"	2025	Jackson August and Patrick Linehan	
"Jackie Chan"	2025	Jackson August and Patrick Linehan	
"Put It on Hearts"	2025	Unknown	
"Hit It"	2026	Unknown	
"Still Loiteringgg"	2026	Whatmore	
"2000s Pop Punk Rnb"	2026	Jackson August and Patrick Linehan	

== Tours ==
Headlining

- Whatmore World Tour (2026)

Opening acts

- Laundry Day – The Time of Your Life Tour (2025)
