= Bambaata Marley =

Jamaican singer-songwriter (born 1989)

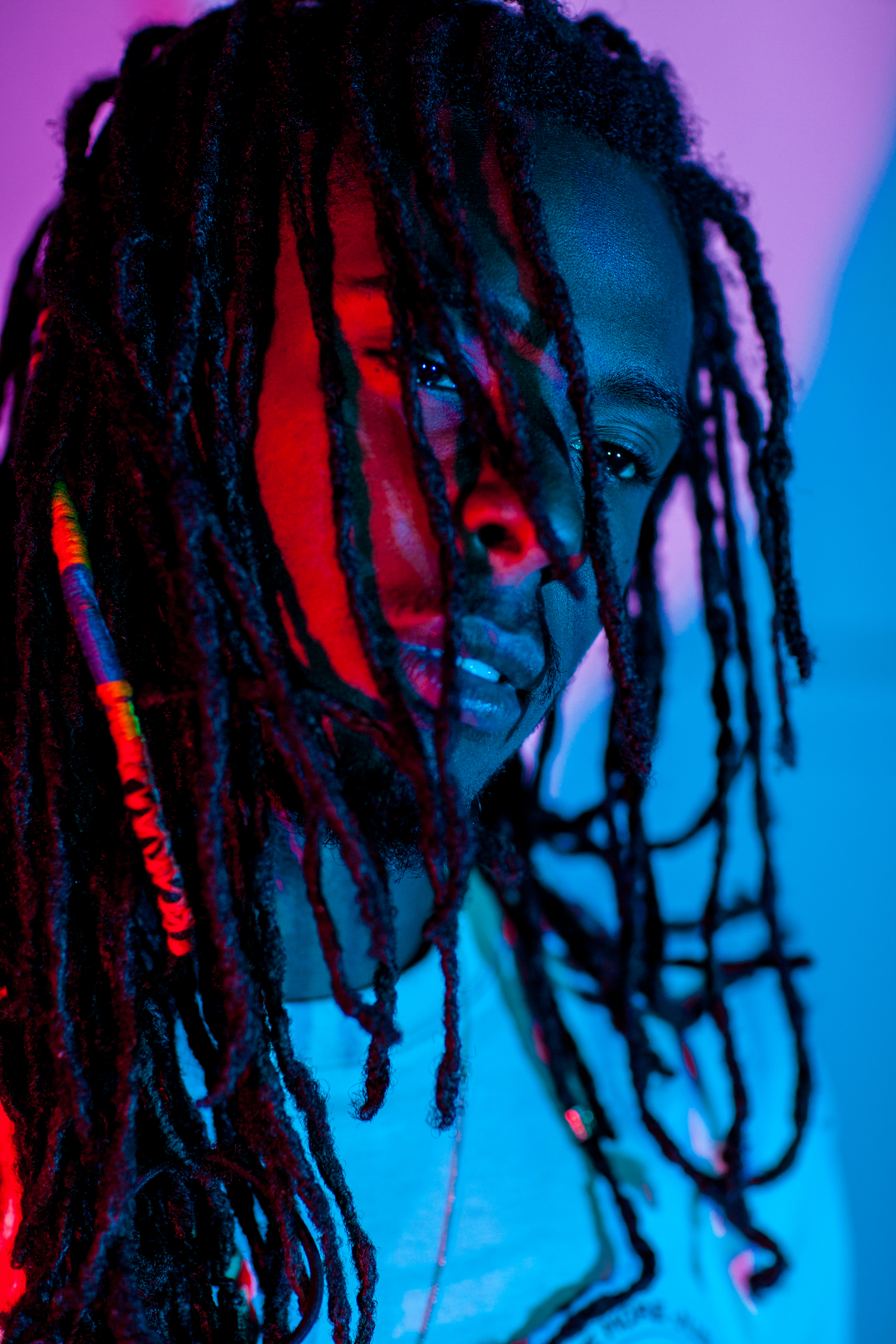

Background information
- Also known as: Bambaata, Daniel Marley, Daniel Bambaata
- Born: Daniel Bambaata Robert Nesta Marley; 12 July 1989 (age 36); Kingston, Jamaica
- Genres: hip hop; pop; reggae
- Occupation: Singer-songwriter
- Instruments: Guitar, vocals, piano, percussion, drums
- Years active: 2009–present

Daniel Bambaata Robert Nesta Marley (born 12 July 1989) is a Jamaican singer-songwriter. He is the eldest son of Ziggy Marley, and eldest grandson of Bob Marley.

== Early life ==
Bambaata Marley spent his early years in Jamaica before moving to Miami, Florida.

== Career ==
Bam Marley debuted in 2009 with the single "Live It Inna Fear", produced by Damian Marley.

In 2010, he collaborated with his cousin Jo Mersa Marley on the single "My Girl".

In 2011, he collaborated with his father Ziggy Marley, on the song "Changes".

On 16 September 2015, the music video for his single "Waiting for the War" was released, the music video was awarded a Telly Award for 'Best Online Music Video' and a Telly Awards for 'Craft-Directing Video' by Wayan Palmieri. The artwork cover for "Waiting for the War" was a re-creation of Bob Marley's Soul Rebels album cover released by Bob Marley & the Wailers in 1970.

In 2017, he made his screen debut in the short film Vagabonds starring Danny Glover & Robert Ri'chard.

== Personal life ==
He currently resides in Los Angeles, California.

== Discography ==
=== Singles ===
- "Live It Inna Fear" (2009)
- "2-Feet" (2012)
- "Maintain" (2014)
- "Waiting For the War" (2015)
- "If You Go" (2015)
- "Unconditional" (2017)
- "Ocean Ocean" (2017)
- "Out To Play" (2017)
- "Deadbeat" (2018)
- "In a Ray" (2018)
- "Pretty Butterfly" (2018)
- "UFO" (2018)
- "Beyond" (2020)
- "Fight Your Fears" (2020)
- "Killin My Kind" (2020)
- "Fettuccine" (2021)
- "Bussin" (2023)
- "Eclipse" (2024)
- "Ghetto Luv" (2024)

=== Extended plays ===
- For Personal Use Only (2023)

=== As featured artist ===
- Jo Mersa Marley "My Girl" (Feat. Daniel Bambaata) (2010)
- Ziggy Marley "Changes" (Feat. Daniel Marley) (2011)
- Inner Circle "Free It Up" (Feat. Daniel Bambaata Marley) (2015)
- The Internet "Get Away (Feat. Daniel Marley) (2015)
- Lorine Chia "The Reason" (Feat. Bambaata Marley) (2018)
- Fana Hues "Til Morning Come" (Feat. Bam Marley) (2024)

== Filmography ==
=== Films ===
- Vagabonds (2017) – Dejohn (short film)

== Music videos ==
Title	Year	Director(s)
"Waiting for the War"	2015	Wayan Palmieri
"Unconditional"	2017	Wayan Palmieri
"Deadbeat"	2018	Wayan Palmieri
"In a Ray"	2019	Wayan Palmieri
"Endlessly"	2020	Wayan Palmieri
"Beyond"	2020	Wayan Palmieri
"Fight Your Fears"	2020	Jason Goldwatch
"Ghetto Luv"	2024	Russell Hamilton
"Ocean Ocean"	2024	Wayan Palmieri

== Awards and nominations ==
=== Indian Telly Awards ===
Year	Nominated Work	Category	Result	Ref.
2017	"Waiting for the War"	Best Online Music Video	Won	
2017	"Waiting for the War"	Directing' (Wayan Palmieri)	Won	
2018	"Unconditional"	Best Online Music Video' – "Unconditional"	Won	
