= Sean Kaufman =

American actor (born 2000)

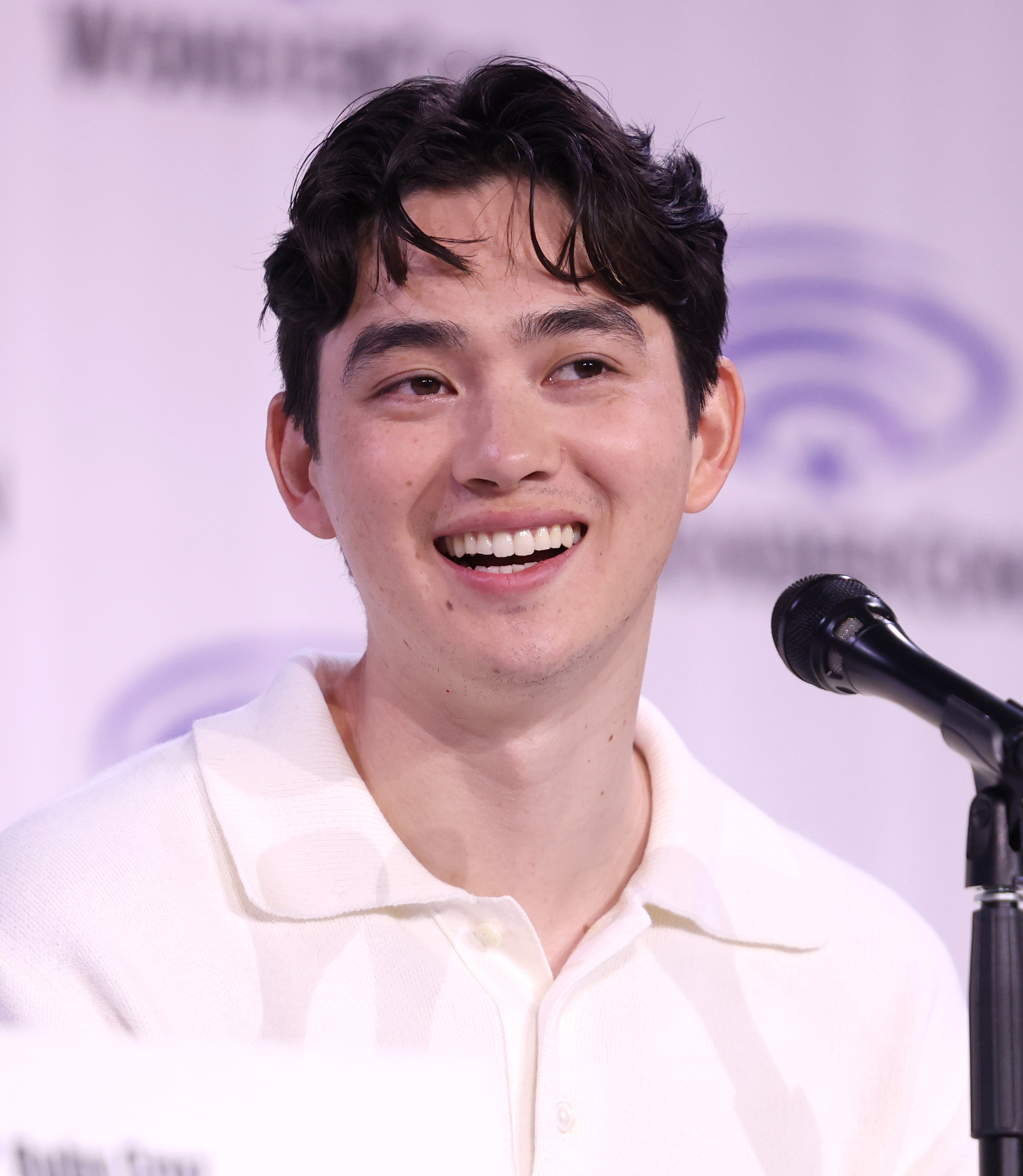
- Kaufman at WonderCon in 2026
- Born: June 22, 2000 (age 26); New York City, U.S.
- Education: Purchase College (BFA)
- Occupation: Actor
- Years active: 2018–present

Sean Kaufman (born June 22, 2000) is an American actor.

== Early life and education ==
Kaufman was born on June 22, 2000 and raised in New York City. His father is American, and is an "underground... actor." His mother is a Japanese immigrant, who is a veterinarian. He has a younger sister, Abby. He attended Fiorello H. LaGuardia High School. He later studied at Purchase College's Acting Conservatory, but dropped out during his junior year to film the first season of The Summer I Turned Pretty. After production wrapped, he resumed his studies and graduated with a BFA in Acting in 2022.

== Career ==
Kaufman is best known for his breakout role as Steven Conklin in the Amazon Prime Video coming-of-age romance series The Summer I Turned Pretty (2022–2025).

== Filmography ==
=== Film ===
Year	Title	Role	Notes	Ref.
2026	Other Mommy	Kelvin		
2027	Untitled Daniels film †		Filming	
2027	Alone at Dawn †		Post-production	

=== Television ===
Year	Title	Role	Notes	Ref.
2018	Law & Order: Special Victims Unit	Grieving Male Student #1	Episode: "Man Down"	
2018	Manifest	Kevin	2 episodes	
2021–2024	FBI: Most Wanted	Eric Fontaine / Teenager	2 episodes	
2022–2025	The Summer I Turned Pretty	Steven Conklin	Main role	
2024	Walker	Henry	Episode: "We've Been Here Before"	
2025–2026	Stumble	Holden	Recurring role, 6 episodes	
2026–present	For All Mankind	Alex Poletov Baldwin	Main role (season 5–present)	

=== Music videos ===
Year	Title	Artist	Ref.
2025	"Bittersweet"	Madison Beer	
2026	"2000s Pop Punk Rnb"	Whatmore	
