= Torches (album) =

Studio album by Foster the People
- Released: May 23, 2011
- Recorded: 2009–2011
- Genres: Indie pop; indietronica; synth-pop; psychedelic pop; dance-pop
- Length: 38:24
- Labels: Startime; Columbia
- Producers: Rich Costey; Paul Epworth; Mark Foster; Tony Hoffer; Greg Kurstin

Foster the People chronology
Foster the People (2011)	Torches (2011)	Supermodel (2014)

Singles from Torches
- 1. "Pumped Up Kicks" Released: September 14, 2010; 2. "Helena Beat" Released: July 26, 2011; 3. "Call It What You Want" Released: December 2, 2011; 4. "Don't Stop (Color on the Walls)" Released: January 10, 2012; 5. "Houdini" Released: May 15, 2012

Torches is the debut studio album by American indietronica band Foster the People, released on May 23, 2011, by Startime International and Columbia Records. In 2010, the group parlayed the popularity of frontman Mark Foster's song "Pumped Up Kicks" into a record deal with Startime International, and wrote the album to back the song's popularity. "Pumped Up Kicks" proved to be a sleeper hit; after receiving significant airplay on modern rock stations, the song crossed-over onto contemporary hit radio and became one of 2011's most popular songs. Four additional singles were released from the album: "Helena Beat", "Call It What You Want", "Don't Stop (Color on the Walls)", and "Houdini", which had previously been released as a promotional single in the United Kingdom prior to the album's release.

Torches received generally favorable reviews from critics and was nominated for the Grammy Award for Best Alternative Music Album. The record peaked at number eight on the Billboard 200 in the US and number one on the ARIA Albums Chart in Australia. It has been certified platinum in Australia, the US, the Philippines, and Canada.

== Background and recording ==
Not long after the band formed, frontman Mark Foster wrote and recorded the song "Pumped Up Kicks" while working as a jingle writer at Mophonics. The song proved to be the band's breakthrough in 2010, going viral, earning the band a booking at the South by Southwest music festival in March 2010, and garnering attention from music industry professionals. Brent Kredel and Brett Williams were hired to co-manage the group and helped them obtain a record deal with Columbia Records imprint Startime International in May 2010.

After the record deal was finalized, Kredel said, "The focus was to stop everything and not work on any marketing or touring, but to make an album that backed up 'Pumped Up Kicks.'" To avoid the band becoming overexposed, Startime allowed the group to pace themselves and not rush an album that would cash in on the popularity of the song. Isaac Green of Startime said, "You can't control everything, but you can be meticulous about the music." From July to September 2010, the group wrote new material that would appear on Torches, and they chose Paul Epworth, Rich Costey, Tony Hoffer and Greg Kurstin to co-produce the record with Mark Foster.

== Artwork ==
The cover artwork was designed by Young & Sick (formerly known as Japayork), a friend of Mark Foster's who was interested in doing illustrations for an album. The group's drummer Mark Pontius explained the origins of the artwork:

We argued about that artwork forever. I think I was the only one who didn't like it. I love his artwork but I had a different image in my mind for the record cover. But I ended up being happy that I lost the fight because it ended up that the characters on the front became this whole world that we ended up including in our live show and on our merch and our website.

== Promotion ==
"Call It What You Want" was also used in the soundtrack of the football video game by EA Sports, FIFA 12. "Houdini" appears in the soundtrack to SSX. The song "Don't Stop (Color on the Walls)" is prominently featured in two Nissan commercials titled "Headroom" and "Legroom." The song was also used in the soundtrack of the racing game Forza Horizon. The music video for "Don't Stop (Color on the Walls)" was featured in stereoscopic 3D on the Nintendo 3DS's application Nintendo Video. Foster the People appeared as the musical guest on the October 8, 2011, episode of Saturday Night Live, playing "Pumped Up Kicks" and "Houdini". Kenny G appeared as a guest performer on the latter song.

Through the iTunes Store, the album is available with the bonus track "Broken Jaw" (which was released as a Record Store Day single limited to 1,000 copies). Best Buy features a CD with the bonus tracks "Love" and "Chin Music for the Unsuspecting Hero". Certain independent record stores included free remix EPs with the purchase of CD or vinyl. In August 2021, Torches X (Deluxe Edition) was announced to mark the album's tenth anniversary. Released on November 12, 2021, it features a cover of "Pumped Up Kicks" by Gus Dapperton.

== Critical reception ==
Professional ratings
Aggregate scores
Source	Rating
AnyDecentMusic?	6.3/10
Metacritic	69/100
Review scores
Source	Rating
AllMusic	4/5 stars
The Austin Chronicle	4/5 stars
Entertainment Weekly	B
The Guardian	2/5 stars
Los Angeles Times	2.5/4 stars
NME	7/10
Pitchfork	6.2/10
Q	4/5 stars
Rolling Stone	3.5/5 stars
Spin	7/10

Torches received generally favorable reviews. According to review aggregator website Metacritic, it received an average critic score of 69 out of 100, based on 20 reviews. AllMusic described the album as a "catchy, electro-lite dance-pop that fits nicely next to such contemporaries as MGMT and Phoenix." Rolling Stone said, "their debut is genre-juggling, bedroom-dance-floor magic cut with moody-boy lyrics". U2 guitarist The Edge singled Torches out as one of his favorite records, calling it "a very interesting new album. Very 21st century pop, but it's beautifully made and thrilling. You see, we're always interested in the new thing..." Elton John also said that Torches was one of his favorites and one of the best albums of 2011. Blue Öyster Cult guitarist Buck Dharma stated on That Metal Show that Torches was one of his favorite new albums.

The album was nominated for the 2012 Grammy Award for Best Alternative Music Album, while "Pumped Up Kicks" received a nomination for Grammy Award for Best Pop Duo/Group Performance.

== Commercial performance ==
Torches debuted at number eight on the US Billboard 200 chart, selling 33,000 copies in the first week. On April 28, 2014, the album was certified platinum by the Recording Industry Association of America (RIAA) for sales of a million copies in the United States.

== Track listing ==
All tracks are written by Mark Foster, except where noted.

Torches (Standard edition)
No.	Title	Producer	Length
1.	"Helena Beat"	Greg Kurstin; Mark Foster	4:36
2.	"Pumped Up Kicks"	Foster	4:00
3.	"Call It What You Want"	Paul Epworth; Foster	3:58
4.	"Don't Stop (Color on the Walls)"	Rich Costey; Foster	2:56
5.	"Waste"	Kurstin; Foster	3:25
6.	"I Would Do Anything for You"	Epworth; Foster; Tony Hoffer	3:35
7.	"Houdini"	Costey; Foster	3:23
8.	"Life on the Nickel" (Epworth, Foster)	Epworth; Foster	3:36
9.	"Miss You" (Zach Heiligman, Foster)	Kurstin; Foster	3:39
10.	"Warrant"	Kurstin; Foster	5:23
Total length:			38:24

iTunes edition bonus track
No.	Title	Length
11.	"Broken Jaw"	5:29
Total length:		44:01

Best Buy exclusive edition bonus tracks
No.	Title	Length
11.	"Love"	3:41
12.	"Chin Music for the Unsuspecting Hero"	3:25
Total length:		45:30

Japanese edition bonus tracks
No.	Title	Length
11.	"Broken Jaw"	5:36
12.	"Love"	3:41
13.	"Chin Music for the Unsuspecting Hero"	3:25
14.	"Pumped Up Kicks" (The Knocks Speeding Bullet remix)	4:39
15.	"Houdini" (RAC remix)	3:56
Total length:		59:41

Australian tour edition – CD 2
No.	Title	Length
1.	"Broken Jaw"	5:29
2.	"Love"	3:40
3.	"Chin Music for the Unsuspecting Hero"	3:24
4.	"Pumped Up Kicks" (The Knocks Speeding Bullet Remix)	4:39
5.	"Houdini" (RAC remix)	3:56
6.	"Helena Beat" (Lenno extended remix)	5:10
7.	"Call It What You Want" (Treasure Fingers pre-party remix radio edit)	3:41
Total length:		29:59

Japanese special limited edition bonus tracks
No.	Title	Length
11.	"Broken Jaw"	5:36
12.	"Love"	3:41
13.	"Chin Music for the Unsuspecting Hero"	3:25
14.	"Pumped Up Kicks" (The Knocks Speeding Bullet remix)	4:39
15.	"Houdini" (RAC remix)	3:56
16.	"Pumped Up Kicks" (Gigamesh remix)	4:33
17.	"Don't Stop (Color On The Walls)" (D Berrie Radio remix)	3:12
18.	"Helena Beat" (Lenno extended remix)	5:10
19.	"Call It What You Want" (Treasure Fingers pre-party remix radio edit)	3:41

Torches X (Deluxe Edition) track listing
No.	Title	Length
11.	"Broken Jaw"	5:36
12.	"Love"	3:41
13.	"Chin Music for the Unsuspecting Hero"	3:25
14.	"Ruby"	5:09
15.	"Downtown"	3:21
16.	"Pumped Up Kicks" (The Knocks Speeding Bullet remix)	4:39
17.	"Houdini" (RAC remix)	3:56
18.	"Helena Beat" (Lenno extended remix)	5:10
19.	"Call It What You Want" (Treasure Fingers pre-party remix radio edit)	3:41
20.	"Pumped Up Kicks" (Gus Dapperton version)	3:53

== Personnel ==
Foster the People

- Mark Foster – vocals (all tracks), synthesizer, programming (tracks 1, 3–10); guitar (tracks 1, 2, 4, 6), percussion (tracks 1, 4, 7, 9), all instruments (track 2), piano (tracks 3, 5–8, 10), Wurlitzer (tracks 3, 6), vibraphone (track 6), drums, glockenspiel (track 8)
- Cubbie Fink – bass (tracks 1, 3–7, 10), backing vocals (tracks 3, 6)
- Mark Pontius – drums (tracks 1, 3–7, 10), percussion (track 1), backing vocals (track 3)

Additional musicians

- Greg Kurstin – programming (tracks 1, 5, 9, 10), synthesizer (track 1)
- Paul Epworth – percussion, keyboards, programming (tracks 3, 8)
- Sean Cimino – guitar (track 5)
- Gary Grant – trumpet (track 7)
- Zach Heiligman – programming (track 9)

Technical

- Mark Foster – recording (tracks 1, 2, 4, 5, 7, 9, 10), additional engineering (tracks 1, 3, 7), mixing (track 2)
- Greg Calbi – mastering
- Billy Bush – recording (track 1)
- Greg Kurstin – recording (tracks 1, 5, 9, 10), mixing (tracks 1, 5, 9)
- Jesse Shatkin – additional engineering (track 1), recording assistant (5, 9, 10)
- Mark Rankin – recording, mixing (tracks 3, 6, 8)
- Charlie Stavish – recording (tracks 4, 7), mix session engineer (track 10)
- Chris Steffen – recording assistant (tracks 4, 7)
- Rich Costey – mixing (tracks 4, 7, 10)

== Charts ==
=== Weekly charts ===
Chart (2011–2012)	Peak position
Australian Albums (ARIA)	1
Austrian Albums (Ö3 Austria)	44
Belgian Albums (Ultratop Flanders)	69
Belgian Albums (Ultratop Wallonia)	99
Canadian Albums (Billboard)	7
Dutch Albums (Album Top 100)	53
French Albums (SNEP)	29
German Albums (Offizielle Top 100)	87
Irish Albums (IRMA)	13
Japanese Albums (Oricon)	49
Mexican Albums (Top 100 Mexico)	30
New Zealand Albums (RMNZ)	18
Polish Albums (OLiS)	47
Scottish Albums (Official Charts)	14
South Korean International Albums (Gaon)	66
Swiss Albums (Schweizer Hitparade)	49
UK Albums (Official Charts)	12
US Billboard 200	8
US Top Alternative Albums (Billboard)	1
US Top Rock Albums (Billboard)	1

=== Year-end charts ===
Chart (2011)	Position
Australian Albums (ARIA)	35
Canadian Albums (Billboard)	42
UK Albums (OCC)	142
US Billboard 200	55
US Top Rock Albums (Billboard)	8

Chart (2012)	Position
Australian Albums (ARIA)	35
UK Albums (OCC)	126
US Billboard 200	61
US Top Rock Albums (Billboard)	18

=== Decade-end-charts ===
Chart (2010–2019)	Position
US Top Rock Albums (Billboard)	22

== Certifications ==
Region	Certification	Certified units/sales
Australia (ARIA)	Platinum	70,000^{^}
Canada (Music Canada)	Platinum	80,000^{^}
Denmark (IFPI Danmark)	Gold	10,000^{‡}
France (SNEP)	Gold	50,000^{*}
New Zealand (RMNZ)	2× Platinum	30,000^{‡}
Philippines (PARI)	Gold	7,500^{*}
Poland (ZPAV)	Platinum	20,000^{‡}
Singapore (RIAS)	Gold	5,000^{*}
United Kingdom (BPI)	Gold	100,000^{*}
United States (RIAA)	3× Platinum	3,000,000^{‡}
^{*} Sales figures based on certification alone.^{^} Shipments figures based on certification alone.^{‡} Sales+streaming figures based on certification alone.
