= Alt Nation =

- Broadcast area: United States; Canada
- Frequencies: Sirius XM Radio 36; DISH Network 6036

Programming
- Format: Alternative rock

Ownership
- Owner: Sirius XM Radio

Technical information
- Class: Satellite Radio Station

Links
- Website: SiriusXM: Alt Nation

Alt Nation is a Sirius XM Radio station broadcasting alternative rock from 2002 to the present. It is carried on Sirius XM Radio channel 36 and DISH Network channel 6036.

The station hosts the Alt Nation Ping Pong Throwdown, which offers listeners the chance to play table tennis with bands featured on the station.

Alt Nation has become increasingly known for breaking new bands into the alternative rock radio scene. For example, the station was the first to play "Pumped Up Kicks" by Foster the People, which went to number one on the Alternative Rock Chart.

== Hosts ==
- Jeff Regan
- Madison
- Tatiana Miranda
- Justin Kade
- JaRon

== Core artists ==
- Bastille
- Cage the Elephant
- Grouplove
- Twenty One Pilots
- Vampire Weekend
- The Black Keys
- Foster the People
- The 1975
- Glass Animals
- Billie Eilish
- Jimmy Eat World
- Muse
- Silversun Pickups
- Gorillaz
- Young the Giant
