= Call It What You Want (Foster the People song) =

Single by Foster the People

from the album Torches
- Released: December 2, 2011
- Recorded: 2010–2011
- Genre: Indie pop; alternative dance
- Length: 4:01
- Label: Columbia
- Songwriter: Mark Foster
- Producers: Paul Epworth; Mark Foster

Foster the People singles chronology
"Helena Beat" (2011)	"Call It What You Want" (2011)	"Don't Stop (Color on the Walls)" (2012)

"Call It What You Want" is a song by American indie pop band Foster the People. It was released as the group's third single in December 2011 from their debut album Torches. The song was written by frontman Mark Foster and produced by Paul Epworth. The song was also featured in the soundtrack of the videogame FIFA 12 and the World Cup mode of FIFA 23. The song appeared at number 14 on the Triple J Hottest 100, 2011 poll.

The song was remixed by (among others) Rizzle Kicks, who recorded their own music video for the track.

== Composition ==
The song is an alternative rock and indie pop song with hypnotic sounding synthesizers and a piano accompanying the entire song with bass guitar and drums.

== Music video ==
A music video to accompany the release of "Call It What You Want" was first released onto YouTube on November 1, 2011 at a total length of four minutes and two seconds. The music video begins with the phrase "Idle minds are the devil's workshop". The video consists of bizarre, absurd sections, including singer Mark Foster pretending to shoot fans with his right finger, drummer Mark Pontius floating while playing the drums, and the band running around outside while fireworks go off around them.

The music video was recorded in Villa de Leon in Malibu, California.

== Track listing ==
Album version
No.	Title	Length
1.	"Call It What You Want"	4:01

UK digital download
No.	Title	Length
1.	"Call It What You Want" (Ocelot Remix)	6:03
2.	"Call It What You Want" (Andy Caldwell Remix)	6:00
3.	"Call It What You Want" (Planet of Sound Remix)	6:26
4.	"Call It What You Want" (Subsource Remix)	5:09
5.	"Call It What You Want" (Karmatronic Remix Club Edit)	6:07
6.	"Call It What You Want" (Treasure Fingers Pre-Party Remix Radio Edit)	3:42

== Personnel ==
- Mark Foster – vocals, synthesizer, piano, Wurlitzer, programming
- Cubbie Fink – bass, backing vocals
- Mark Pontius – drums, backing vocals
- Paul Epworth – percussion, keyboards, programming

== Charts ==
=== Weekly charts ===
Chart (2011–12)	Peak position
Australia (ARIA)	39
Belgium (Ultratip Bubbling Under Flanders)	16
Belgium (Ultratip Bubbling Under Wallonia)	14
Japan Hot 100 (Billboard)	75
Switzerland Airplay (Schweizer Hitparade)	82
UK Singles (Official Charts Company)	139

== Certifications ==
Region	Certification	Certified units/sales
Australia (ARIA)	Gold	35,000^{^}
New Zealand (RMNZ)	Gold	15,000^{‡}
United Kingdom (BPI)	Silver	200,000^{‡}
United States (RIAA)	Gold	500,000^{‡}
^{^} Shipments figures based on certification alone.^{‡} Sales+streaming figures based on certification alone.

== Release history ==
Country	Date	Format	Label
United Kingdom	December 2, 2011	Digital download	Columbia
Germany	April 20, 2012	Digital download	Columbia
