= 3net =

American 3D television channel

- Country: United States
- Broadcast area: Nationwide

Programming
- Picture format: 1080i (3DTV)

Ownership
- Owner: Discovery Communications; Sony; IMAX Corporation
- Sister channels: GSN; Sony Movie Channel; Cine Sony Television; Discovery Networks

History
- Launched: February 13, 2011; 14 years ago
- Closed: August 12, 2014; 10 years ago

3net was an American 3D television channel that launched on February 13, 2011. It was a joint venture between Discovery Communications, Sony and IMAX Corporation. The partnership was announced in June 2010, and the channel was previewed publicly at the 2011 Consumer Electronics Show.

== Carriage ==
DirecTV carried the channel exclusively since launch. Nintendo's 3DS handheld system frequently provided episodic clips of content from 3net's programs on their Nintendo Video service. On August 12, 2014, 3net ceased broadcasting to all providers and was dropped from the DirecTV channel lineup.

== Programming ==
The channel had several original shows as well as theatrical films.

=== Original shows ===
- Building the Brand
- Son of a Pitch
- Experience 3D
- In The Qube 3D
- Wildebeest Migration
- Bullproof
- African Wild
- Attack of the Giant Jellyfish
- China Revealed
- Ghost Lab
- Dream Defenders
- High Octane
- Jewels of the World
- Making the Brand
- 2011 3D Creative Arts Awards: Your World in 3D
- 3D Safari: Africa
- Space: Unraveling the Cosmos
- Scary Tales

Repeats of the 3net series African Wild and Building the Brand are currently airing on the digital broadcast network Quest albeit not in 3D.
