= Helena Beat =

Single by Foster the People

from the album Torches
- Released: July 26, 2011
- Genre: Synth-rock
- Length: 4:36 (album version); 3:52 (radio edit)
- Label: Columbia
- Songwriter: Mark Foster
- Producer: Greg Kurstin

Foster the People singles chronology
| "Pumped Up Kicks" (2010) | "Helena Beat" (2011) | "Call It What You Want" (2011) |

"Helena Beat" is a song by American indie pop band Foster the People. It is the opening track from their debut studio album Torches and was released as the record's second single. It was solicited to radio on July 26, 2011, and solicited to radio in the United Kingdom on September 5, 2011. On August 10, 2011, BBC Radio 1 DJ Greg James selected the song as his Record of the Week.

It was announced in January 2012 that "Helena Beat" was the most-played track on Australian radio station Triple J in 2011. The song appeared at number 15 on the Triple J Hottest 100, 2011 poll, and it ranked as music streaming service Spotify's fifth-most streamed song of the year.

== Inspiration and composition ==
"Helena Beat" was written by the group's lead songwriter Mark Foster to embody the attitude of the drug culture within Hollywood. Foster says the lyrics—particularly the line "Yeah yeah and it's okay, I tie my hands up to a chair so I don't fall that way"—are meant to express the nonchalant attitude that people have to their destructive tendencies. He said, "They're the young, hot, up and coming, powerful people that are gonna run the world. But they're just going out and doing drugs every night. They're saying it with this big smile of their face like 'I'm great, everything's great,' but don't you see that you're completely out of your mind on drugs right now that you can't even stand?" Foster composed the song using the Logic Pro software; the original project file for "Helena Beat" is included in new copies of the application. "Helena Beat" is an alternative rock song written in F minor with a tempo of 127 beats per minute.

== Music video ==
A music video, directed by Ace Norton, to accompany the release of "Helena Beat" was released onto YouTube on July 18, 2011.

The video begins with singer Mark Foster fleeing from a destroyed Los Angeles in a dystopian future along with his dog – inspired by the film Mad Max. On the road out of the city, he finds a baby carriage and goes to investigate. When he gets out of the van, a gang of violent, rebellious children attacks him and takes him hostage while his dog flees. The other members of the band are taken hostage as well. They are then taken to the children's headquarters, where they are tortured, beaten, and abused. Foster is then seated and restrained, he's joined to a strange machine that's also attached to an older man seated opposite him. When the machine powers on, bright bolts of electricity arc back and forth, and the machine looks as if it is going to transform the older man into someone young again by stealing Foster's youth. Instead, it works quite the opposite and when the device is turned off, alternately most of the life is drained from the man (now very old) and Foster is turned into a young boy. After being turned into a child, he is now accepted as one of them.

== Usage in media ==
The song was used in the films 21 Jump Street and Boyhood, as well as the TV series Late Show with David Letterman and The Vampire Diaries

== Track listing ==
Album version
| No. | Title | Length |
|---|---|---|
| 1. | "Helena Beat" | 4:36 |

== Personnel ==
- Mark Foster – vocals, guitar, synthesizer, percussion, programming, song writer
- Mark Pontius – drums and extra percussion
- Cubbie Fink – bass
- Greg Kurstin – synthesizer, programming

== Charts ==
=== Weekly charts ===
| Chart (2011–2012) | Peak position |
|---|---|
| Australia (ARIA) | 74 |
| Canada Hot 100 (Billboard) | 70 |
| Canada Rock (Billboard) | 12 |
| Mexico Ingles (Billboard) | 35 |
| US Bubbling Under Hot 100 (Billboard) | 21 |
| US Hot Rock & Alternative Songs (Billboard) | 15 |

=== Year-end charts ===
| Chart (2011) | Peak position |
|---|---|
| US Alternative Songs | 39 |
| Chart (2012) | Peak position |
| US Hot Rock Songs | 97 |

== Certifications ==
| Region | Certification | Certified units/sales |
|---|---|---|
| Canada (Music Canada) | Gold | 40,000^{*} |
| New Zealand (RMNZ) | Gold | 15,000^{‡} |
| United States (RIAA) | 2× Platinum | 2,000,000^{‡} |
^{*} Sales figures based on certification alone.^{‡} Sales+streaming figures based on certification alone.

== Release history ==
| Country | Date | Format |
|---|---|---|
| United States | July 26, 2011 | Alternative radio |
| United Kingdom | August 24, 2011 | Contemporary hit radio |
