= Don't Stop (Color on the Walls) =

2012 single by Foster the People

Single by Foster the People

from the album Torches
- Released: January 10, 2012
- Recorded: 2010–2011
- Length: 2:57
- Label: Columbia; Startime
- Songwriter: Mark Foster
- Producers: Rich Costey; Mark Foster

Foster the People singles chronology
"Call It What You Want" (2011)	"Don't Stop (Color on the Walls)" (2012)	"Houdini" (2012)

"Don't Stop (Color on the Walls)" is a song by American indie pop band Foster the People from their debut studio album Torches. Written by the band's frontman Mark Foster, the song was released as the fourth single from the album on January 10, 2012. "Don't Stop (Color on the Walls)" has been used in television commercial advertisements for the Nissan Versa. The song was also featured in videogame Forza Horizon and trailers for the movie Turbo. The song was written about what a four-year-old would do if they ruled the world.

== Music video ==
The music video for "Don't Stop (Color on the Walls)" was filmed and directed by Daniels in 3D in partnership with Digital Revolution Studios and released on December 8, 2011. It stars Foster alongside American actress Gabourey Sidibe.

In the video, Sidibe plays a driving student who unknowingly lets a con man (played by Foster) into her car, thinking he is the DMV examiner. The con man and the student fight for control of the wheel as the car (a Toyota Tercel) moves, and end up attracting the attention of two police officers (played by Foster the People members Mark Pontius and Cubbie Fink) driving a Ford Crown Victoria Police Interceptor. They end up on a car chase around Hollywood, which ends when the con man gives himself up to the police and the student drives away.

At the 2012 3D Creative Arts Awards in Hollywood, the International 3D Society presented Digital Revolution Studios with a Lumiere Award for Best Television Short for the music video.

== Personnel ==
- Mark Foster – vocals, guitar, synthesizer, percussion, programming
- Cubbie Fink – bass guitar
- Mark Pontius – drums

== Charts ==
=== Weekly charts ===
Weekly chart performance for "Don't Stop (Color on the Walls)"
Chart (2011–2012)	Peak position
Belgium (Ultratip Bubbling Under Wallonia)	28
Canada Hot 100 (Billboard)	56
Canada Rock (Billboard)	13
Slovakia Airplay (ČNS IFPI)	47
US Billboard Hot 100	86
US Adult Pop Airplay (Billboard)	17
US Dance Club Songs (Billboard)	10
US Hot Rock & Alternative Songs (Billboard)	8
US Pop Airplay (Billboard)	34

=== Year-end charts ===
Year-end chart performance for "Don't Stop (Color on the Walls)"
Chart (2012)	Position
US Hot Rock Songs (Billboard)	27

== Certifications ==
Certifications and sales for "Don't Stop (Color on the Walls)"
Region	Certification	Certified units/sales
Canada (Music Canada)	Gold	40,000^{*}
United States (RIAA)	Platinum	1,000,000^{‡}
^{*} Sales figures based on certification alone.^{‡} Sales+streaming figures based on certification alone.

== Release history ==
Release dates and formats for "Don't Stop (Color on the Walls)
Country	Date	Format
United States	January 10, 2012	Alternative radio
United Kingdom	April 23, 2012	Digital download
