= Pumped Up Kicks =

2010 song by Foster the People

Single by Foster the People

from the EP Foster the People and the album Torches
- B-side: "Pumped Up Kicks" (A cappella); "Pumped Up Kicks" (Instrumental) (12")
- Released: September 14, 2010
- Recorded: 2009
- Studio: Mophonics (Venice, California)
- Genre: Indie pop; psychedelic pop; alternative rock; alternative pop
- Length: 4:00 (album version); 3:40 (radio edit / short intro); 4:13 (radio edit / long outro verse)
- Label: Columbia; Startime
- Songwriter: Mark Foster
- Producer: Mark Foster

Foster the People singles chronology
"Pumped Up Kicks" (2010)	"Helena Beat" (2011)

Music video
- "Pumped Up Kicks" on YouTube

"Pumped Up Kicks" is the debut single by American indie pop band Foster the People. It was released in September 2010, and the following year was included on their self-titled EP and their debut album, Torches. "Pumped Up Kicks" became the group's breakthrough hit and was one of the most popular songs of 2011. The song was written and recorded by frontman Mark Foster while he was working as a commercial jingle writer. Contrasting with the upbeat musical composition, the lyrics describe the homicidal thoughts of a troubled youth named "Robert."

The track received considerable attention after it was posted online in 2010 as a free download, and it helped the group garner a multi-album record deal with Columbia Records imprint Startime International. "Pumped Up Kicks" proved to be a sleeper hit; in 2011, after receiving significant airplay on modern rock stations, especially on SiriusXM's Alt Nation, the song crossed-over onto contemporary hit radio stations. The song spent eight consecutive weeks at number three on the Billboard Hot 100 chart in the United States, making it the first Billboard Alternative Songs number-one single to crack the U.S. top 5 since Kings of Leon's "Use Somebody" in 2009. The song was widely praised by critics, and it has been licensed for use in a wide range of popular media since its release. "Pumped Up Kicks" also received a Grammy Award nomination for Best Pop Duo/Group Performance. The song remains the band's most successful hit single to date.

== Writing and recording ==
Soon after Mark Foster formed Foster the People in 2009, he wrote and recorded "Pumped Up Kicks" in five hours while working as a commercial jingle writer at Mophonics in Los Angeles. On the day of recording, Foster debated between songwriting in the studio and going to the beach. He explained: "I really didn't have anything to do that day. I was standing there in the studio, and this thought came in my mind like, 'I'm going to write a song,'... and then I was like, 'I don't feel like writing. I don't want to write a song.' I was a block away from the beach, and it was a beautiful day. I kind of just wanted to just be lazy and go hang out at the beach or whatever. But I just forced myself to write a song... By that time the next day, the song was finished."

Reflecting on the lack of inspiration he felt when writing the song, Foster said, "I've heard a lot of other artists talk about this as well, like, 'I'm not inspired right now. I've got writer's block. I'm just not really feeling anything.' And I've felt that way, too, just not being inspired and wanting to wait for inspiration to come before I wrote. But I wasn't inspired when I wrote 'Pumped Up Kicks,' and that's what came out. So... it just solidified the notion that persistence is more powerful than inspiration." Thinking that he was just recording a demo, he played all of the instruments on the song, and using the software Logic Pro, he arranged and edited the song himself. The demo is ultimately the version of the song that Foster released.

== Composition and inspiration ==
I like to write about real-life topics, and I like to write about different walks of life. For me, that song was really an observation about something that's happening in the youth culture these days. I guess I wanted to reveal that internal dialogue of a kid who doesn't have anywhere to turn, and I think the song has kind of done its job. I think people are talking about it, and it's become a point of conversation, which I think is a really healthy thing.

— Mark Foster

The lyrics to "Pumped Up Kicks" are written from the perspective of a troubled and delusional youth with homicidal thoughts. The lines in the chorus warn potential victims to "outrun my gun" and that they "better run, better run, faster than my bullet". Foster said to CNN Entertainment, "I wrote 'Pumped Up Kicks' when I began to read about the growing trend in teenage mental illness. I wanted to understand the psychology behind it because it was foreign to me. It was terrifying how mental illness among youth had skyrocketed in the last decade. I was scared to see where the pattern was headed if we didn't start changing the way we were bringing up the next generation." In writing the song, Foster wanted to "get inside the head of an isolated, psychotic kid" and "bring awareness" to the issue of gun violence among youth, which he feels is an epidemic perpetuated by "lack of family, lack of love, and isolation." The title refers to the expensive Reebok Pumps that his classmates wore, in addition to "kicks" being an American slang word for shoes.

The issue of youth violence is a matter close to the group. Foster was bullied in high school, while bassist Cubbie Fink has a cousin who survived the Columbine High School massacre in 1999. Fink said of his cousin's experience: "She was actually in the library when everything went down, so I actually flew out to be with her the day after it happened and experienced the trauma surrounding it and saw how affected she was by it. She is as close as a sister, so obviously, it affected me deeply. So to be able to have a song to create a platform to talk about this stuff has been good for us."

Contrasting with the dark lyrics of the song, the music, which was written first, is upbeat. Foster said: "It's a 'fuck you' song to the hipsters in a way—but it's a song the hipsters are going to want to dance to." Jeffery Berg of Frontier Psychiatrist said, "I was so engrossed with the cheery melody of its chorus that it took me a few listens to discover that the lyrics suggest dark, Columbine revenge."

Due to the opening lyrics, "Robert's got a quick hand", many have speculated that the song is a reference to Robert Hawkins, perpetrator of Omaha's Westroads Mall shooting. The band's publicist denied any connection: "This is completely false. The character name in the song is just a coincidence." For play on the television channels MTV and MTVu, the words "gun" and "bullet" were removed from the song's chorus. Many have written letters to Foster's record label and called radio stations to complain that the song was glorifying school shootings. He explained, "The song is not about condoning violence at all. It's the complete opposite. The song is an amazing platform to have a conversation with your kids about something that shouldn't be ignored, to talk about it in a loving way."

== Release and promotion ==
=== Initial attention ===
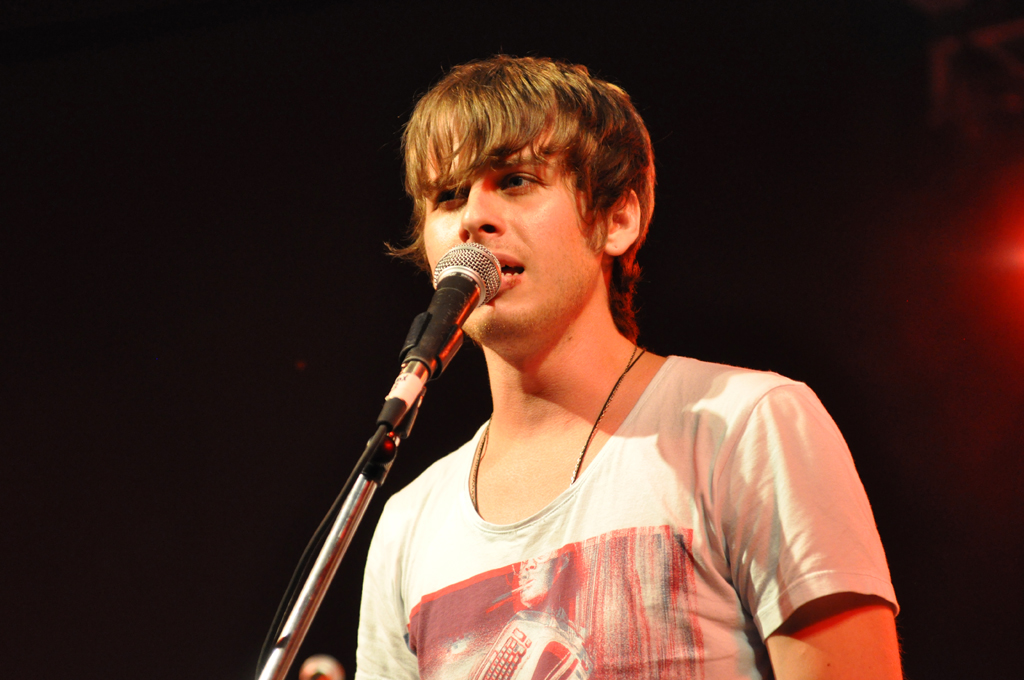
After writing "Pumped Up Kicks", Mark Foster (pictured) posted the song on his website as a free download. It subsequently grew in popularity through viral outlets and earned the band a record deal.

"Pumped Up Kicks" drew considerable attention online after Foster posted the song on his website as a free download in early 2010; Nylon magazine used the track in an online advertising campaign, and through various blogs, it went viral. Foster the People first performed the song live at the Stand Up Charity Benefit in Venice in February. The group, yet to be signed, garnered buzz with performances at the South by Southwest music festival in March. Foster was e-mailed by many people about the song, and needing professional guidance, he contacted artist manager Brent Kredel at Monotone, Inc., saying, "Everyone is calling me and e-mailing me—what do I do? Who are the good guys, who are the bad guys?" Kredel recalled that "He went from the guy who couldn't get a hold of anyone to being the guy who had hundreds of e-mails in his inbox." Kredel and Brett Williams were subsequently hired to co-manage Foster the People, and they helped the group get a multi-album record deal with Columbia Records imprint Startime International in May 2010. Wishing to release a record that would back up the song's success, the group wrote new material between July–September 2010.

"Pumped Up Kicks" was licensed for use in a July 2010 episode of the TV series Entourage, the first of many instances in which Foster the People's music was licensed in popular media. The song received its first widespread radio play that month on Sirius XM's Alt Nation channel and the Australian radio station Triple J. In November, the University of Maryland's radio station WMUC played the song, marking its debut on US terrestrial radio. The song placed at number 32 in the Triple J's Hottest 100 for 2010, a notable achievement due to the band being relatively unknown in Australia. Still, the group was inexperienced as a live act, and as a result, their booking agent Tom Windish secured them several club shows "to help them get their sea legs." Foster the People promoted these concerts in January 2011 by emailing fans who had downloaded "Pumped Up Kicks" from their website, notifying them of the shows. The group continued to grow its fanbase with a month-long residency of concerts in January at The Echo nightclub in Los Angeles. By the group's third show at the venue, according to Windish, "there were hundreds of people trying to get in outside... It was an obvious turning point that could be measured in numbers."

=== Commercial breakthrough ===
In January 2011, the band issued their first commercial non-single release, a self-titled EP on which "Pumped Up Kicks" appeared. Around the same time, many alternative radio stations began playing "Pumped Up Kicks", including Los Angeles terrestrial stations KROQ-FM and KYSR, and it continued to gain popularity on Alt Nation. Mark Foster credits Sirius XM's airplay with the song's success, saying, "Alt Nation played our music before any other radio outlet in the country." On January 29, the song debuted on Billboard's Rock Songs chart and a week later, it debuted on the Alternative Songs chart. In May, the track debuted at number 96 on the Billboard Hot 100, and later that month, the group released their first full-length studio album, Torches, on which "Pumped Up Kicks" appears. On May 23, 2011, BBC Radio 1 DJ Greg James selected the song as his Record of the Week, which ran until May 27. During this time, James released an accompanying video of him dancing to the song which he entitled and promoted "The Bum Dance".

The song proved to be a crossover hit; after peaking at number one on the Alternative Songs chart in June and number three on the Rock Songs chart in July, the song broke into the top 40 of the Hot 100 in late July and appeared on the Adult Top 40 and Mainstream Top 40 charts. Columbia senior VP of promotion Lee Leipsner said, "It was one of the only alternative bands I remember in a while that you could actually dance to. And the fact that the record has a groove and rhythmic feel to it—not heavy guitar-based at all—gave us a wide opportunity to cross the record." He credits the song's crossover success and push into the top 40 to a June presentation of new music by Clear Channel president of national programming platforms Tom Poleman. According to Leipsner, "After we showed our presentation, we had so many Clear Channel major-market programmers come up to us and say, 'The record I want to play besides Adele is Foster the People.'" "Pumped Up Kicks" peaked at number three on the Hot 100, spending eight consecutive weeks at the position, seven of them stuck behind Maroon 5's "Moves Like Jagger" and Adele's "Someone Like You" occupying the two spots above. It has been certified 5× platinum in Canada and Australia, 14× platinum in the United States, and gold in Germany. The song ranked as the sixth-best-selling digital song of 2011 in the United States with 3.84 million copies sold, while it ranked as music streaming service Spotify's most streamed song of the year. The song has sold 5,173,000 copies in the United States as of August 2013.

== Music video ==
The music video, directed by Josef Geiger, follows the band playing various venues in California in the leadup to their first international tour to Australia. There are also cuts to band members doing other activities, such as playing frisbee and surfing. Parts of the video were filmed at the University of California, Riverside, the band's first official show, and at a huge parking lot, on 2131 Humboldt St, Lincoln Heights, Los Angeles which was used as a film location for the originally planned video for Pumped Up Kicks. The video was shelved as the result was a bit too dark for the song, and Josef Geiger was asked to create a video from his footage that would highlight being on the road with the band as they were living through the hype machine that was Pumped Up Kicks. The video peaked at number 21 on the MuchMusic Countdown in Canada. As of April 2025, the video has received over 1.1 billion views on YouTube.

== Reception ==
=== Critical reaction ===
"Pumped Up Kicks" received positive reviews from critics. Barry Walters of Spin said that with the song as their debut single, Foster the People "announce themselves as major players." Jon Dolan of Rolling Stone described the song as having a "slinky groove, misty guitar flange and delicious astral-wimp vocals." Rob Webb of NME drew some parallels between the song and other indie pop hits like "Young Folks", "Paris", and "Kids" describing its rise in popularity thus: "artist writes (undeniably brilliant) pop song, makes it catchy as hell, but quirky enough for the 'cool' crowd, song subsequently gets some big pimping from every blog/radio station/Hype Machine user on the planet and, seemingly overnight, becomes utterly, irritatingly inescapable."

August Brown of the Los Angeles Times called it a "reputation-making single" that "cakes Foster in Strokes-y vocal distortion atop a loping synth bass." Jon Pareles of The New York Times called it a "pop ditty with dazed, dweeby vocals and a handclapping chorus that warns, 'You better run, better run, outrun my gun.'" BBC Music's Mark Beaumont called the song a "psychedelic block party skipping tune." Reflecting on the song's fusion of various musical elements, Beaumont said the song is a prime example of how they "adapt Animal Collective's art-tronic adventurousness to incorporate the funky danceability of Scissor Sisters, the fuzzy pop catchiness of 'Kids' and the knack of throwing in deceptively downbeat twists akin to Girls, Sleigh Bells or Smith Westerns." Matt Collar of AllMusic said the song, like other tracks from the album, is "catchy, electro-lite dance-pop that fits nicely next to such contemporaries as MGMT and Phoenix". The Guardian's Michael Hann was less receptive, saying it "amounts to little more than a bassline and a chorus" and that "It's as irresistible as it is infuriating".

=== Accolades ===
A Rolling Stone readers poll named it the second-best song of summer 2011. Claire Suddath of Time magazine named "Pumped Up Kicks" one of the Top 10 Songs of 2011, while Entertainment Weekly selected the song as the year's second-best single. In end-of-year polls, writers for Rolling Stone selected "Pumped Up Kicks" as the 11th-best song of 2011, while the publication's readers voted it the year's sixth-best song.

A listeners poll by Toronto radio station CFNY-FM (102.1 The Edge) voted it No. 1 in a list of the top 102 new rock songs of 2011. NME ranked it number 21 on its list of the "50 Best Tracks of 2011", writing, "Unusually for a song so omnipresent, listening to its hyper-upbeat melodies about a psycho high-school kid-killer is still an enjoyable experience." The magazine's readers voted "Pumped Up Kicks" the year's eighth-best song. At the end of 2011, the song received a Grammy Award nomination for Best Pop Duo/Group Performance.

== Impact ==
I think it's great that that song did what it did around the world, not just for us as a band but I think for a lot of other artists who are left-of-centre artists. That song kind of paved the way for. Now I listen to the radio and there are songs like Gotye, with "Someone That I Used To Know" has blown up, and Fun. – their song has blown up, I raise my glass to artists when that happens, you know?

— Mark Foster, on the song's success

In an article for The Huffington Post, DJ Louie XIV singled out "Pumped Up Kicks" as one of several popular songs that helped usher in the return of commercially successful indie music. In discussing the growing acceptance of fringe cultures, he wrote, "It seems only fitting, then, that the soundtrack to this time period should be music that was itself once viewed as fringe culture." Reflecting on the song's success, Gary Trust, the associate director of charts/radio for Billboard, said, "They're walking a tightrope very well in terms of eras, formats and styles. When you mix all that together, it becomes a very good recipe for a hit that works on so many levels. It's the perfect song." Foster said of the song, "There's a spirit there and that's what people resonate with. 'Pumped Up Kicks' wasn't an accident."

=== Use in popular media ===
The song was used in TV series such as Entourage, Gossip Girl, CSI: NY, Cougar Town, The Game, Homeland, Pretty Little Liars, Warehouse 13 and The Vampire Diaries, the web series Dick Figures, and also in the 2011 films Friends with Benefits and Fright Night, as well as sampled in Shawn Chrystopher's song "All the Other Kids", from his 2010 hip-hop album You, and Only You. The whistling part of the song is part of the rotation of bumper music played on the Michael Medved syndicated radio program. The song has also been used on the BBC TV shows Top Gear and Match of the Day in the United Kingdom. British radio station Talksport has used the instrumental version on their "Drive" program. On October 8, 2011, Foster the People performed the song on Saturday Night Live. The song was also used in Australian beer XXXX's "XXXX Summer Bright Lager" television commercial. "Pumped Up Kicks" was included as a playable track in the music video game Rock Band Blitz and Guitar Hero Live. The song was also used in season one episode four of Suits in the episode "Dirty Little Secrets". The song was used in "Piggy Piggy", the sixth episode of the first season of American Horror Story. The song since its release in 2012 has received massive use on the internet in meme culture as well. A rock cover of the song (sung by Michael Starr of Steel Panther) was used in the credits of the episode "Best Friends, For Never" of the HBO Max series Peacemaker, as a reference to the character of Evan that likes the song.

=== Brief radio ban ===
The song was temporarily pulled from circulation on certain U.S. radio stations in response to the 2012 Sandy Hook Elementary School shooting.

=== Cover versions and remixes ===
The official remix of the single was released by New York City-duo The Knocks in April 2011, under the name "Pumped Up Kicks (The Knocks Speeding Bullet Remix)", and was made available to subscribers to the band's email list. The song was covered by Weezer during their 2011 North American Tour, at the Orange County Fair on August 4, 2011. Weezer also played the song during their grandstand performance at the Minnesota State Fair on September 3, 2011. Mark Foster said in reaction, "Nine years ago, I met Rivers Cuomo at a party, and I had my acoustic guitar with me. He taught me how to play 'Say It Ain't So'. So nine years later, to watch him play one of my songs – it was wild. I can't wait to meet him and remind him of that story."

Marquese Scott's 2011 YouTube video of himself dancing to a Butch Clancy dubstep remix of Pumped Up Kicks propelled him to stardom after that video went viral.

In 2011, The Kooks covered the song in BBC Radio 1's Live Lounge. Australian musician Owl Eyes performed a version of "Pumped Up Kicks" for Triple J's Like a Version. Also in 2011 the underground rapper George Watsky released a "Pumped Up Kicks" remix on his album A New Kind of Sexy Mixtape. In the Triple J Hottest 100, 2011, Owl Eyes' version came in at 28, four positions higher than the original did the previous year. Singer-songwriters Dani Shay and Justin Chase covered the song in a theatrical music video in October 2011 and released the single in November 2011. A parody of the song was performed by Taylor Swift and Zac Efron on The Ellen DeGeneres Show, as a serenade to the host. Its lyrics were about how they felt weird when Ellen used to put them as a couple when they were not. On March 12, 2012, singers Lex Land and Charlotte Sometimes performed the song during the second "Battle Round" episode of The Voice season 2. In September 2012, singer Mackenzie Bourg performed this song as his Blind Audition for The Voice season 3, winning a spot on Cee Lo Green's team. Kendrick Lamar also recorded a remix to the song with DJ Reflex. On February 1, 2013, singer Fatin Shidqia performed this song as her solo performances on Bootcamp three episode of X Factor Indonesia. The rapper Yonas released a remix version to "Pumped Up Kicks". "Weird Al" Yankovic covered the song as part of his polka medley "NOW That's What I Call Polka!" for his 2014 album, Mandatory Fun. Keller Williams with The Travelin' McCourys has performed this song in concert.

Peruvian singer Tongo also recorded a cover in 2017, called "Pan con ají" (Bread and peppers), in allusion to a vague pronunciation with Spanish phonemes. In 2017, French DJ Klingande released a song titled "Pumped Up" using the same lyrics in the chorus of the song. In contrast to the original lyrics, Klingande's version is told from the perspective of a girl who saw the troubled boy. She wishes to "show him the light" and lead him down a better path.

In June 2019, industrial metal band 3Teeth released a cover of the song. It later appeared on their album Metawar. Texas country rock band Giovannie and the Hired Guns have covered the song as a single for Amazon Music in 2022 and was on the live album Tejano Punk Boyz Live which was released in 2023.

== Track listing ==
UK digital download
No.	Title	Length
1.	"Pumped Up Kicks"	3:58
2.	"Pumped Up Kicks" (Chrome Canyon remix)	4:51

Vinyl – side A
No.	Title	Length
1.	"Pumped Up Kicks"	4:13
2.	"Chin Music for the Unsuspecting Hero"	3:26

Vinyl – side B
No.	Title	Length
1.	"Pumped Up Kicks" (A cappella)	4:13
2.	"Pumped Up Kicks" (Instrumental)	4:13

== Personnel ==
- Mark Foster – vocals, guitar, bass, keyboards, synthesizers, programming, drums, percussion, mixing
- Greg Calbi – final mastering

== Charts ==
=== Weekly charts ===
Weekly chart performance
Chart (2011–2018)	Peak position
Australia (ARIA)	1
Austria (Ö3 Austria Top 40)	3
Belgium (Ultratop 50 Flanders)	30
Belgium (Ultratop 50 Wallonia)	40
Brazil (Billboard Hot 100)	31
Canada Hot 100 (Billboard)	3
Canada AC (Billboard)	33
Canada CHR/Top 40 (Billboard)	2
Canada Hot AC (Billboard)	9
Canada Rock (Billboard)	13
Czech Republic Airplay (ČNS IFPI)	5
Czech Republic Singles Digital (ČNS IFPI)	87
France (SNEP)	10
Germany (GfK)	9
Greece Digital Songs (Billboard)	6
Ireland (IRMA)	11
Italy (FIMI)	59
Japan Hot 100 (Billboard)	9
Mexico (Billboard Mexican Airplay)	1
Mexico Anglo (Monitor Latino)	2
Netherlands (Dutch Top 40)	34
Netherlands (Single Top 100)	35
New Zealand (Recorded Music NZ)	6
Poland Airplay (ZPAV)	1
Scottish Singles Sales (Official Charts)	18
Slovakia Airplay (ČNS IFPI)	1
Slovenia (SloTop50)	1
South Korea International Singles (Gaon)	106
Sweden Heatseeker (Sverigetopplistan)	18
Switzerland (Schweizer Hitparade)	17
UK Singles (Official Charts)	18
US Billboard Hot 100	3
US Adult Contemporary (Billboard)	28
US Adult Pop Airplay (Billboard)	3
US Dance Club Songs (Billboard)	39
US Dance Airplay (Billboard)	1
US Hot Rock & Alternative Songs (Billboard)	3
US Pop Airplay (Billboard)	3
US Rhythmic Airplay (Billboard)	24

Chart (2020)	Peak position
Czech Republic (Modern Rock)	3

Chart (2024)	Peak position
Global 200 (Billboard)	193

=== Year-end charts ===
Annual chart rankings
Chart (2011)	Position
Australia (ARIA)	23
Austria (Ö3 Austria Top 40)	59
Canada (Canadian Hot 100)	21
Germany (Official German Charts)	90
New Zealand (RIANZ)	33
Switzerland (Schweizer Hitparade)	62
UK Singles (OCC)	105
US Billboard Hot 100	13
US Adult Top 40 (Billboard)	23
US Dance/Mix Show Airplay (Billboard)	50
US Hot Rock Songs (Billboard')	4
US Mainstream Top 40 (Billboard)	24

Chart (2012)	Position
Australia (ARIA)	54
Austria (Ö3 Austria Top 40)	60
Canada (Canadian Hot 100)	50
France (SNEP)	53
Germany (Official German Charts)	74
Switzerland (Schweizer Hitparade)	73
US Digital Song Sales (Billboard)	69
US On-Demand Songs (Billboard)	25
US Hot Rock Songs (Billboard)	76
US Ringtones (Billboard)	41

Chart (2013)	Position
Slovenia (SloTop50)	8

=== Decade-end charts ===
Chart (2010–2019)	Position
Australia (ARIA)	27
US Hot Rock Songs (Billboard)	41

== Certifications ==
Region	Certification	Certified units/sales
Australia (ARIA)	18× Platinum	1,260,000^{‡}
Austria (IFPI Austria)	Platinum	30,000^{*}
Canada (Music Canada)	5× Platinum	400,000^{*}
Denmark (IFPI Danmark)	Platinum	90,000^{‡}
Germany (BVMI)	Platinum	300,000^{^}
Italy (FIMI)	Platinum	50,000^{‡}
Mexico (AMPROFON)	2× Platinum+Gold	150,000^{‡}
New Zealand (RMNZ)	9× Platinum	270,000^{‡}
Spain (Promusicae)	Platinum	60,000^{‡}
United Kingdom (BPI)	5× Platinum	3,000,000^{‡}
United States (RIAA)	14× Platinum	14,000,000^{‡}
^{*} Sales figures based on certification alone.^{^} Shipments figures based on certification alone.^{‡} Sales+streaming figures based on certification alone.

== Release history ==
Country	Date	Format	Label
United States	September 14, 2010	Vinyl	Columbia; Startime
Worldwide	February 4, 2011	Vinyl	Columbia; Startime
United Kingdom	June 19, 2011	Digital download	Columbia; Startime
United States	July 19, 2011	Mainstream airplay	Columbia; Startime

== See also ==
- List of best-selling singles in Australia
- List of number-one Billboard Alternative Songs of 2011
- List of number-one dance airplay hits of 2011 (U.S.)
- List of number-one singles of 2012 (Australia)
