= Craig Tanner (producer) =

American film producer

- Craig Tanner on the set of Avatar
- Born: Craig Ellis Tanner; March 28, 1974 (age 52); Coronado Island, California
- Education: Roseburg High School
- Alma mater: United States Air Force Academy
- Occupations: Film Director, producer, editor, and CEO/Founder of D35, Inc.
- Years active: 2000 – present

Craig Tanner (born March 28, 1974) is an American film director, film producer, and editor. He is best known for his work as visual effects editor for the film Avatar and as producer and editor of God Sleeps in Rwanda. Tanner is the founder of D35, Inc, a post-production and editorial services company that has provided marketing and finishing services for major studios, including Marvel Studios.

== Early life ==
Tanner was born in Coronado Island, California and raised in the small town of Roseburg, Oregon. Tanner was a star athlete in high school, lettering in football, swimming, ski team, and wrestling team. He was offered a full scholarship to play college football at the Air Force Academy. Tanner was a starter for the Division I NCAA football program for three seasons, winning the Western Athletic Conference (1995) and playing in the Copper Bowl (1995).

Tanner is a graduate of the Air Force Academy and served in the armed forces for eight years. During his service, Tanner's passion for making movies was recognized and consequently charged with filming and editing for the United States Air Force.

== Career ==
After completing his military service, Tanner began working in Hollywood as a feature film editor and transitioned into post-production roles with major studios. In 2005, he was nominated for an Academy Award and received a Primetime Emmy Award for his work as producer and editor of the documentary God Sleeps in Rwanda.[2]

Tanner later joined the editorial and visual effects teams on large-scale studio features. As the visual effects editor on Avatar (2009), he contributed to the development and management of the hybrid live-action and performance-capture post-production pipeline used by director James Cameron.[3]

In the following years, Tanner expanded his work in editorial, producing, and directing across studio projects and independent productions. He has continued to work extensively in editing and post-production finishing for major studios.

Tanner is the founder of D35 Inc., a post-production and editorial services company. Through D35 Inc., he has provided editorial, marketing services, and creative support for multiple studio campaigns, including work for Marvel Studios and other major entertainment companies.

== Work ==
=== Filmography ===
Year	Title	Role
2001	Crocodile Dundee in Los Angeles	Assistant Editor
2002	We Were Soldiers	Assistant Editor
2003	Shattered Glass	Associate Editor
2003	The Young Black Stallion	First Assistant Editor
2004	The Passion of the Christ	Assistant Editor
2005	Hide and Seek	Associate Editor
2005	The Family Stone	Associate Editor
2005	God Sleeps in Rwanda	Editor, Producer
2007	Breach	Associate Editor
2007	Meter Maids	Editor
2007	Fantastic Four: Rise of the Silver Surfer	Visual Effects Editor
2009	Avatar	Visual Effects Editor
2010	Foster The People - Don't Stop - 3D Music Video	Producer
2010	Animal Encounters - Denver Museum of Nature and Science	Director / Producer
2011	Jillian's Travels	Director / Executive Producer
2011	3D Safari: Africa	Executive Producer
2011	Bullproof - 3D TV Series	Director / Executive Producer
2011	Living Large - 3D TV Series	Executive Producer
2011	Birds, Birds, Birds - 3D TV Series	Executive Producer
2011	The Cat House - 3D TV Series	Executive Producer
2011	WWII Winners - 3D TV Series	Executive Producer
2011	Cold Blooded - 3D TV Series	Executive Producer
2011	Moments In Asia - 3D TV Series	Executive Producer
2011	Jungles - 3D TV Series	Executive Producer
2011	Closed Encounters - 3D TV Series	Executive Producer
2011	Anza Borrego - The Last Refuge - 3D TV Series	Executive Producer
2011	BAMMA USA: Fight Night - 3D TV Series	Director / Executive Producer
2012	Humor & Heartache of War - Documentary	Director
2012	Animal Empire - 3D TV Series	Executive Producer
2012	Places & Spaces - 3D TV Series	Executive Producer
2012	Pocket Destinations - 3D TV Series	Executive Producer
2013	Road to Paradise - Documentary	Executive Producer
2014	Transformers: Age of Extinction	Stereoscopic Editor
2015	Terminator Genisys	Stereoscopic Editor
2015	Pee-wee's Big Holiday	VFX Supervisor
2016	Allegiant	Visual Effects Editor
2016	Rules Don't Apply	VFX Supervisor
2016	Captain America: Civil War	Editor - Marketing
2016	Doctor Strange	Editor - Marketing
2017	Guardians of the Galaxy Vol. 2	Editor - Marketing
2017	Spider-Man: Homecoming	Editor - Marketing
2017	Thor: Ragnarok	Editor - Marketing
2018	Black Panther	Editor - Marketing
2018	Avengers: Infinity War	Editor - Marketing
2018	Ant-Man and the Wasp	Editor - Marketing
2019	Captain Marvel	Editor - Marketing
2019	Avengers: Endgame	Picture Editor
2019	Spider-Man: Far From Home	Editor - Marketing
2020	WandaVision	Editor - Marketing
2021	What If...?	Editor - Marketing
2021	Black Widow	Editor - Marketing
2021	Shang-Chi and the Legend of the Ten Rings	Supervising Editor - Marketing
2021	Eternals	Supervising Editor - Marketing
2021	The Falcon and the Winter Soldier	Editor - Marketing
2021	Loki	Editor - Marketing
2021	Hawkeye	Supervising Editor - Marketing
2021	Spider-Man: No Way Home	Supervising Editor - Marketing
2022	Doctor Strange in the Multiverse of Madness	Supervising Editor - Marketing
2022	Ms. Marvel	Supervising Editor - Marketing
2022	Thor: Love and Thunder	Supervising Editor - Marketing
2022	Moon Knight	Supervising Editor - Marketing
2022	Black Panther: Wakanda Forever	Supervising Editor - Marketing
2022	She-Hulk: Attorney at Law	Supervising Editor - Marketing
2023	Ant-Man and the Wasp: Quantumania	Supervising Editor - Marketing
2023	Loki: Season 2	Supervising Editor - Marketing
2023	I Am Groot	Supervising Editor - Marketing
2023	Secret Invasion	Supervising Editor - Marketing
2023	Guardians of the Galaxy Vol. 3	Supervising Editor - Marketing
2023	Echo	Supervising Editor - Marketing
2023	What If...?: Season 2	Supervising Editor - Marketing
2024	X-Men '97	Supervising Editor - Marketing
2024	Agatha: Coven of Chaos	Supervising Editor - Marketing
2024	Deadpool & Wolverine	Supervising Editor - Marketing
2025	Ironheart	Supervising Editor - Marketing
2025	Captain America: Brave New World	Supervising Editor - Marketing
2025	Daredevil: Born Again	Supervising Editor - Marketing
2025	Ironheart	Supervising Editor - Marketing
2025	The Fantastic Four: First Steps	Supervising Editor - Marketing
2025	Eyes of Wakanda	Supervising Editor - Marketing
2025	Marvel Zombies	Supervising Editor - Marketing
2026	Wonder Man	Supervising Editor - Marketing
2026	Daredevil: Born Again	Supervising Editor - Marketing
2026	The Punisher: One Last Kill	Supervising Editor - Marketing
2026	X-Men '97	Supervising Editor - Marketing
2026	Spider-Man: Brand New Day	Supervising Editor - Marketing
2026	Your Friendly Neighborhood Spider-Man	Supervising Editor - Marketing
2026	VisionQuest	Supervising Editor - Marketing
2026	Avengers: Doomsday	Supervising Editor - Marketing

=== Awards and nominations ===
- In 2005, Tanner received an Emmy and was nominated for an Oscar for his work in God Sleeps in Rwanda.
- In 2011, Tanner received a Lumiere for the "3D Electronic Media" in the Foster the People music video "Don't Stop"
- In 2011, Tanner received an Telly Award for the "Best Use of 3D" in the TV series Bullproof
- In 2012, Tanner received an Telly Award for the "Best 3D Commercial - Army Strong"
- In 2012, Tanner received an Telly Award for the "Best 3D Online Programs - Pocket Destinations"
- In 2012, Tanner received an Telly Award for the "Best 3D Non-Broadcast Production - Humor & Heartache of War"
- In 2012, Tanner received an Telly Award for the "Best 3D Online Music Video - Don't Stop"
