= Sunita Mani =

American actress, dancer, comedian (born 1986)

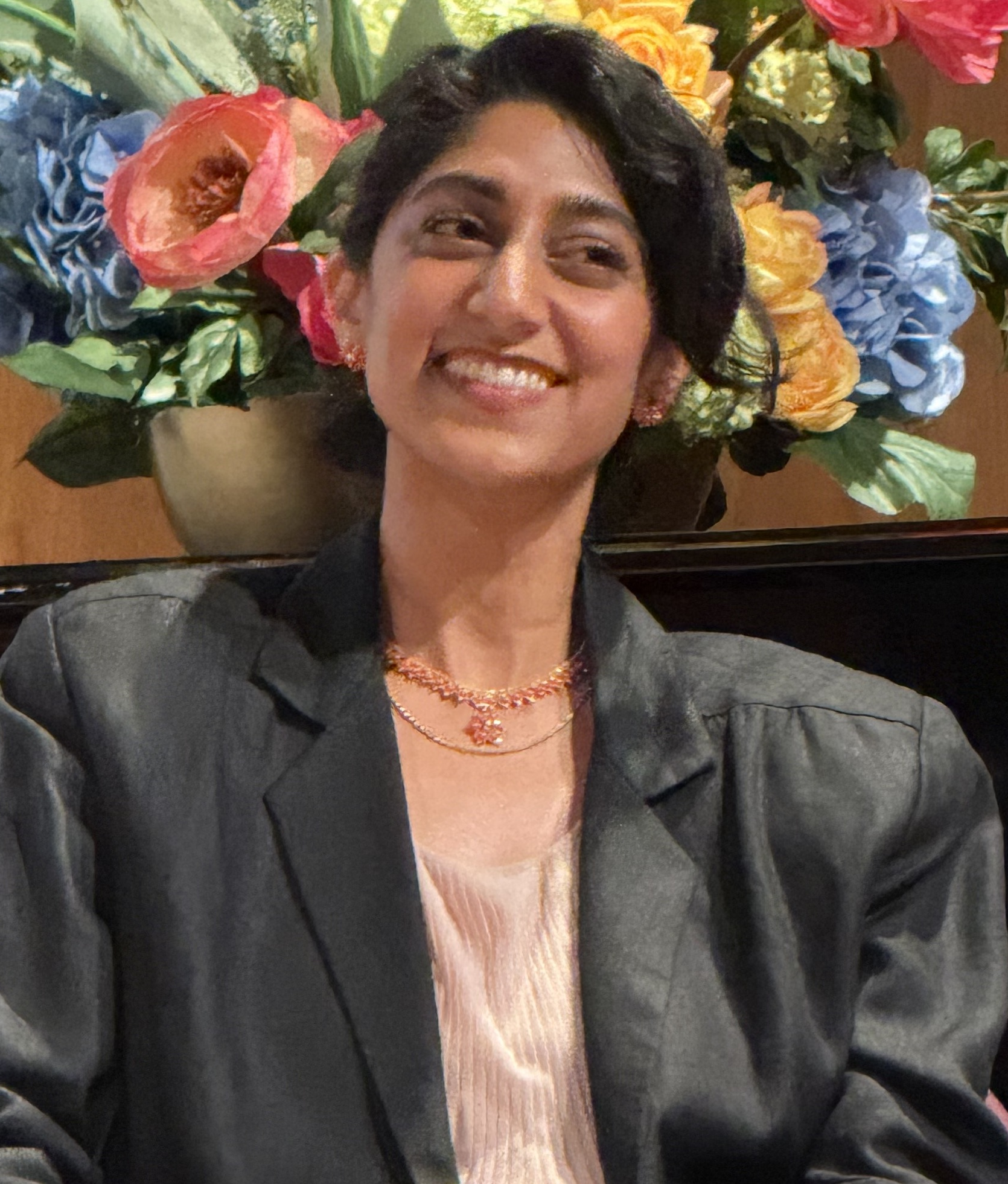
- Mani in 2026
- Born: December 13, 1986 (age 39)
- Education: Emerson College
- Occupations: Actress; dancer; comedian
- Years active: 2005–present
- Spouse: Kenny Warren (m. 2018)

Sunita Mani (born December 13, 1986) is an American actress, dancer and comedian. She is best known for her television roles as Trenton in the USA Network drama Mr. Robot (2015–2017) and Arthie Premkumar in the Netflix comedy GLOW (2017–2019). Mani played the lead roles in the 2020 films Save Yourselves! and Evil Eye.

== Early life ==
Mani was born to Usha and Venk Mani from Tamil Nadu, India.

She graduated from Dickson County High School in Dickson, Tennessee, in 2004.

After studying writing at Emerson College, graduating in 2008, where she gained experience in stand-up comedy, Mani joined the Upright Citizens Brigade for three years, where she learned more about improv.

== Career ==
She began her acting career by appearing in the MTV web TV pilot Writer's Block, and in a few commercials including ones for Burger King and Levi's.

Her first film appearance was in The Unspeakable Act (2012), an American coming-of-age drama written and directed by Dan Sallitt which won the Sarasota Film Festival's Independent Visions Award. Mani gained public recognition for her dance performance in the music video for the song "Turn Down for What", released in December 2013. She appeared in the drama–thriller television series Mr. Robot as Trenton. In 2016, she appeared in Don't Think Twice, an episode of Broad City, and episodes of The Good Place. She was cast in the 2017 Netflix series GLOW and in Spirited, a satire on A Christmas Carol, alongside Ryan Reynolds. In 2023, she voiced Ursula, a protagonist of HBO Max's series Scavengers Reign (2023). In 2026, she appears as Priya Patel in the Netflix series His & Hers.

Mani is a member of the alt-comedy group Cocoon Central Dance Team.

== Filmography ==
=== Film ===
Year	Title	Role	Notes
2012	The Unspeakable Act	Jessica	
2013	Sardines out of a Can	Extra	
2015	3rd Street Blackout	Elora	
2015	Stinking Heaven	Sunita	
2016	Little Sister	Performance Art Dancer	
2016	Don't Think Twice	Amy	
2018	Madeline's Madeline	Assistant Max	
2019	The Death of Dick Long	Lake Travis	
2019	Wine Country	Dolly	
2019	Can You Keep a Secret?	Lissy	
2020	Save Yourselves!	Su	
2020	The Outside Story	Slater	
2020	Evil Eye	Pallavi Kharti	
2022	Everything Everywhere All at Once	TV Musical - Queen	
2022	Spirited	Ghost of Christmas Past	
2023	You Hurt My Feelings	Dr. Allen	
2023	Please Don't Destroy: The Treasure of Foggy Mountain	Tricia	
2023	The Wild	Emilia	
2024	A Nice Indian Boy	Arundhathi Gavaskar	
2025	Death of a Unicorn	Dr. Bhatia	
2025	The Roses	Jane	
2026	Never Change!	Ms. Wing	
TBA	Rest and Relaxation	Amandeep	Post-production

=== Television ===
Year	Title	Role	Notes
2012, 2018	The Chris Gethard Show	Various	3 episodes
2015–2017	Mr. Robot	Trenton	16 episodes
2016	Person of Interest	Sonum	Episode: "The Day the World Went Away"
2016	Broad City	Coworker	1 episode
2016	The Good Place	Chad	2 episodes
2016	Search Party	Pia	2 episodes
2016	Netflix Presents: The Characters	Party attendee (uncredited)	1 episode
2017–2019	GLOW	Arthie Premkumar	29 episodes
2017–2021	No Activity	Fatima Khorasani	27 episodes
2018	Drop the Mic	Herself	Episode: "WWE Superstars vs. GLOW & Laila Ali vs. Chris Jericho"
2019	Helpsters	Rhonda Runner	Episode: "Amazing Alie/Robbie & Rhonda Runner"
2020	Three Busy Debras	Homra Simpson	Episode: "Debspringa"
2020	At Home with Amy Sedaris	Denise Hershey Musgrave	Episode: "Signature Dishes"
2020	Social Distance	Dr. Larson	Episode: "Humane Animal Trap"
2020	Dream Corp LLC	Margot Daly	Recurring; 8 episodes
2020–2021	Mira, Royal Detective	Neeti/Preeti (voice)	4 episodes
2021	Cinema Toast	(voice)	Episode: "After the End"
2021	Scenes from a Marriage	Danielle	Episode: "Innocence and Panic"
2021	Summer Camp Island	(voice)	Episode: "Spirit Balls"
2021	Ultra City Smiths	Detective Jaya Mukherjee (voice)	2 episodes
2022	Servant	Veera	4 episodes
2023	We Baby Bears	Laila (voice)	Episode: "Doll's House"
2023	Bupkis	Monica	Episode: "ISO"
2023	Scavengers Reign	Ursula (voice)	12 episodes
2024	Royal Crackers	Janice (voice)	Episode: "Bidai"
2024	Fantasmas	Nancy	Episode: "Cookies and Spaghetti"
2025	Goldie	Petey's Mom (voice)	Episode: "Tall Teeny/Pilroy"
2025	Haunted Hotel	Heather (voice)	3 episodes
2025	Government Cheese	Edith	Episode: "Two Doors"
2026	His & Hers	Priya "Boston" Patel	6 episodes

=== Short videos ===
Year	Title	Role
2012	See You Then, Then	
2013	Sardines Out of A Can	Extra
2015	The Truth About Meeting Women	
2015	This is a Dream and I'm Going to Kill You	Sunita
2016	Why Wasn't It Perfect?	Haley Sharma
2016	Vegas	Vegas
2016	The Place We Live	Autumn
2017	Snowy Bing Bongs Across the North Star Combat Zone	
2017	I Brought Pie	Alice
2018	Alpha Squadron	Alpha 4 / Chelsea
2019	Regulation	Mia Nichols
2019	Dick Pics! (A Documentary)	
2019	Others	John's Other
2020	I Love to Wait	

=== Music videos ===
Year	Title	Artist	Ref.
2010	"Commotion"	The Hundred in the Hands	
2014	"Turn Down for What"	DJ Snake and Lil Jon	
