= What Can't Be Mentioned =

- Directed by: Dan Sallitt
- Written by: Dan Sallitt
- Produced by: Graham Swon
- Starring: Tallie Medel; Sky Hirschkron; Kyle McCormack; Kit Zauhar
- Cinematography: Barton Cortright
- Edited by: Dan Sallitt
- Production company: Ravenser Odd
- Release date: October 3, 2026 (NYFF)
- Running time: 61 minutes
- Country: United States
- Language: English

What Can't Be Mentioned is a 2026 American drama film written, edited, and directed by Dan Sallitt. It is a sequel to The Unspeakable Act (2012). Tallie Medel and Sky Hirschkron reprise their roles as Jackie Kimball and Matthew Kimball, alongside Kyle McCormack and Kit Zauhar.

The film premiered in the Currents section of the 2026 New York Film Festival on October 3.

== Cast ==
- Tallie Medel as Jackie Kimball
- Sky Hirschkron as Matthew Kimball
- Kyle McCormack as Anthony
- Kit Zauhar as Lily
- Caroline Luft as Linda

== Production ==
In August 2025, it was reported that Dan Sallitt was developing a sequel to The Unspeakable Act (2012), with Tallie Medel and Sky Hirschkron reprising their roles as Jackie Kimball and Matthew Kimball, alongside Kyle McCormack and Kit Zauhar. Principal photography began in October of that year. In August 2026, the film was selected to be screened at the 2026 New York Film Festival.

== Release ==
What Can't Be Mentioned premiered in the Currents section of the 2026 New York Film Festival on October 3.
