= Frank Mosley =

American actor, writer and director

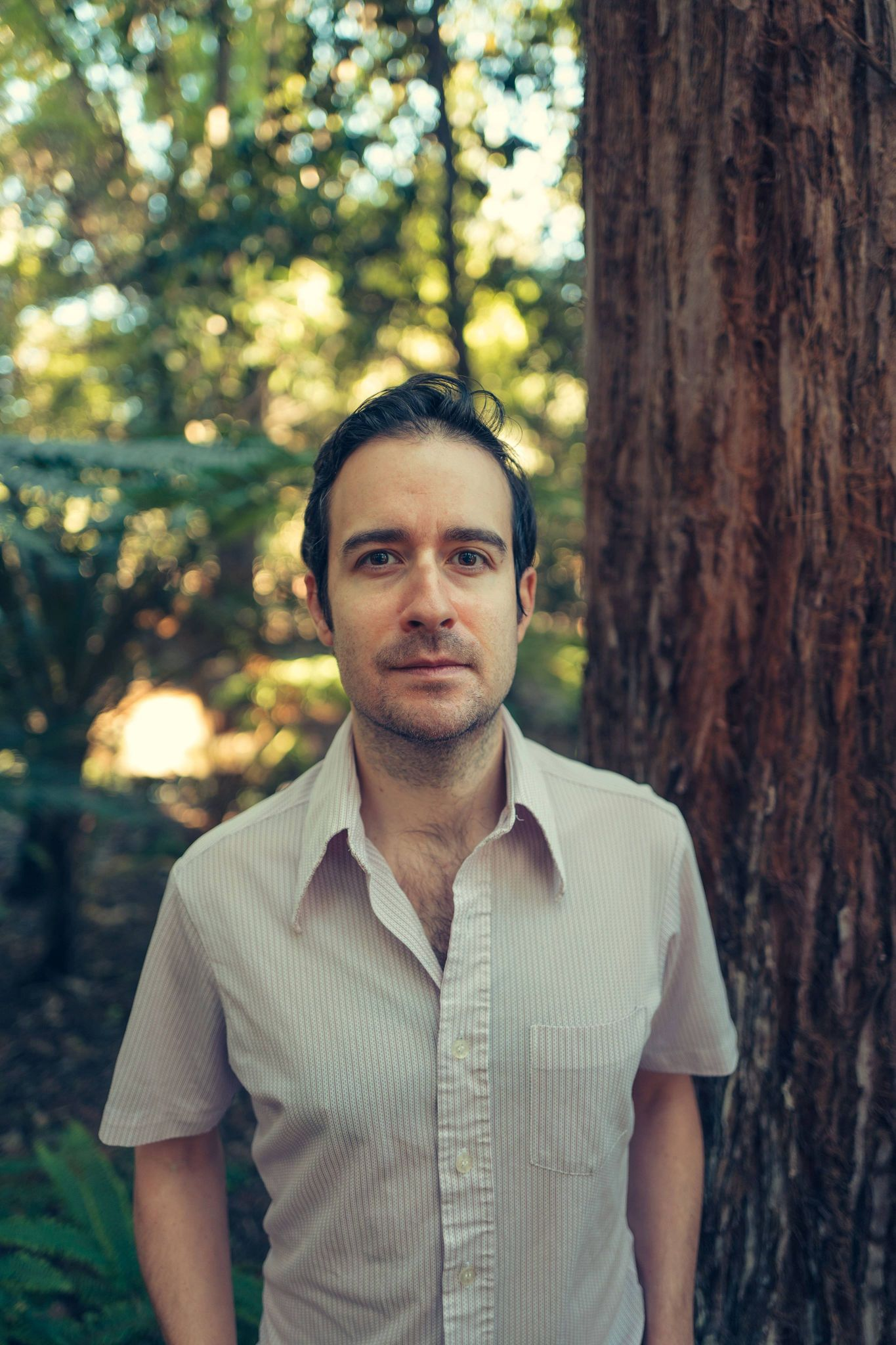
- Born: Arlington, Texas, United States
- Occupations: Actor; director; producer; writer; editor
- Years active: 1998–present

Frank Mosley is an American actor, director, producer, writer and editor.

== Life and career ==
Mosley was born in Arlington, Texas. He graduated with a B.A. in English Literature and a minor in film from the University of Texas at Arlington. He is an alumnus of Berlinale Talents. He received the 2013 Visionary Award at Fort Worth Weekly.

Mosley directed his debut feature film, Hold, premiered at the Dallas International Film Festival in 2010. In 2014, His second feature film, Her Wilderness, premiered at the Sidewalk Film Festival. He also directed his trilogy of shorts film, Spider Veins, Casa De Mi Madre and Parthenon. He was selected for a retrospective of his work by Spectacle Theater and Kinoscope.

== Select filmography ==
Year	Film	Director	Writer	Editor	Producer	Note
2009	Hold	Yes		Yes	Yes	
2014	Her Wilderness	Yes	Yes	Yes	Yes	
2014	White Creek				Yes	
2015	Tears of God				Yes	
2016	Spider Veins	Yes	Yes	Yes	Yes	Short film
2017	Parthenon	Yes	Yes	Yes	Yes	Short film
2017	Casa De Mi Madre	Yes	Yes	Yes	Yes	Short film
2018	Shoot the Moon Right Between the Eyes				Yes	
2019	The Ghost Who Walks				Yes	

=== Actor ===
Year	Title	Role	Notes
2013	Ain't Them Bodies Saints	Lt. Carson	
2013	Upstream Color	Husband	
2014	The Ladies of the House	Piglet	
2015	Some Beasts	Sal	
2015	They Had It Coming	Billy	
2015	Aimy in a Cage	News Anchor	
2016	The Procedure	The Asshole	Short film
2016	The Bulb	Dan	Short film
2016	Collective: Unconscious	Frank	
2016	Americana	Josh McAllister	
2017	Don't Ever Change	Jason	Short film
2017	Person to Person	Arguing Man	
2018	Thunder Road	Homeless Man	
2019	Chained for Life	Frank	
2019	The Ghost Who Walks	Stitches	
2020	The Carnivores	Dog-Man	
2020	Freeland	Josh	
2021	Kin	Kurt	Short film
2021	Dear Mr. Brody	Donald Thomas Moore	Documentary
2022	Quantum Cowboys	Depew	

== Awards and nominations ==
Year	Result	Award	Category	Work	Ref.
2009	Nominated	Action On Film International Film Festival	Best Supporting Actor	The Other Side of Paradise	
2010	Nominated	Dallas International Film Festival	Texas Competition	Hold	
2016	Won	Sarasota Film Festival	Outstanding Performance	Some Beasts	
2018	Won	Champs-Élysées Film Festival	US in Progress Award	The Ghost Who Walks	
2018	Nominated	Slamdance Film Festival	Best Short	Parthenon	
2019	Won	St. Louis Filmmakers Showcase	Best Supporting Actor	The Ghost Who Walks	
