= Matt Thompson (film director) =

American film director (born 1984)

Matt Thompson (born in Roseville, California on 19 May 1984), is an American film director, producer, screenwriter and actor. He also directed some music videos and commercials and acted on stage productions.

Born to Tim and Cindy Thompson, he grew up in Sacramento, California and graduated from Granite Bay High School, starting his acting debut at 18 and has appeared in many movies since. He made his feature directorial debut with the feature film Listen to Your Heart, starring Cybill Shepherd, Kent Moran, Alexia Rasmussen and Ernie Sabella. He also played lead role of Stanley Kowalski in the stage presentation of A Streetcar Named Desire. He was named as one of 15 people to watch early in their careers by Sacramento Magazine in its March 2010 cover story.

== Filmography ==
=== Director ===
- 2005: Fallen Soldier (short film)
- 2010: Listen to Your Heart
- 2011: Two to Tango (as associate editor)
- 2011: Bloodline

=== Producer ===
- 2005: Fallen Soldier (short film)
- 2010: Phase Two (associate producer)
- 2011: Bloodline

=== Editor ===
- 2011: Bloodline

=== Actor ===
- 2005: Fallen Soldier as Jeff Evans (short)
- 2007: 7eventy 5ive (aka Dead Tone) as Matthew
- 2007: Women on Death Row 2 as Steve (TV documentary)
- 2008: The Hustle as Paramedic
- 2009: Stamped! as Cody
- 2009: Sensored as Marcus
- 2010: Phase Two as Jim Fields
- 2010: Smosh (TV series) in episode "Ian Gets Lucky" as Jock
- 2011: Two to Tango as Neil (short)
- 2011: Bloodline as Brett Ethos
