= Bloodline (2011 film) =

- Theatrical release poster
- Directed by: Matt Thompson
- Written by: Matt Thompson
- Produced by: Matt Thompson; Michael Reinero
- Starring: Matt Thompson; Kimberly Alexander; Jesse Kristofferson
- Cinematography: John Alexander Jimenez
- Edited by: Matt Thompson
- Release date: June 24, 2011 (Sacramento)
- Running time: 88 minutes
- Country: United States
- Language: English

Bloodline is an American horror film written, produced and directed by Matt Thompson. It stars Thompson himself, in addition to Kimberly Alexander and Jesse Kristofferson. It follows his debut long feature Listen to Your Heart and is shot mainly on location in El Dorado, Placer and Sacramento counties.

== Plot ==
After a native American chief puts a curse on white settlers for killing his son, his descendants and other white settlers have to collaborate in ending the curse two hundred years later.

== Cast ==
- Matt Thompson as Brett Ethos
- Kimberly Alexander as Katie
- Jesse Kristofferson as Kevin
- Gina Comparetto as Chelsi
- Christopher Frontiero as Davy
- Grainger Hines as Ranger Ray
- Zahn McClarnon as Jack
- Michael Reinero as Officer Daniels
- Mark Hoffman as William Ethos

== Production ==
Thompson first starting writing the film some time around 2003 or 2004, opting to write a horror film as he believed it would be a quick seller. Thompson's friend Michael Reinero, also an actor, financed $10,000 to allow for 10 minutes of footage to be shot, in the hope of attracting further investment. The footage, filmed in 2009 around Sly Park, El Dorado County, forms the opening scenes.

Main filming began around April 2010 at a concrete plant in South Sacramento. A new terminal at nearby Sacramento International Airport was also considered. Due to the global recession, outside investment was harder to secure, resulting in Reinero personally financing the film, reportedly costing "under a million" dollars, according to Thompson. The film took around 38 days to shoot using a Red One production camera. His younger brother and mother assisted with underwater filming and set design, respectively. Reinero, who has a supporting role in the film, also acted as an executive producer.

=== Post-production ===
Thompson was reportedly still "tinkering" with edits on the film just 10 days prior to its scheduled June 24, 2011 release. Although originally preferring to show it at film festivals, he subsequently opted for a theatrical release so that he could start working on his next film.

== Critical reception ==
Writing for Letterboxd, Heather Santrous gave the film 3-stars, believing it "isn't a great movie, but not a bad first effort", describing the story as being common for the horror genre, but otherwise "still well told".
