= Sallitt =

Sallitt is a surname. Notable people with the surname include:

- Dan Sallitt (born 1955), American filmmaker and film critic
- Dame Jilly Cooper, née Jill Sallitt (1937–2025), English author and journalist
