= The Challenger (2015 film) =

2015 film by Kent Moran

- Theatrical Release Poster
- Directed by: Kent Moran
- Written by: Kent Moran
- Produced by: Kent Moran; Adam Hawkey; Ellyette Eleni
- Starring: Kent Moran; Michael Clarke Duncan; S. Epatha Merkerson; Frank Watson; Stan Carp; Ernie Sabella; Justin Hartley
- Cinematography: Giacomo Belletti
- Edited by: Kent Moran; Anthony Muzzatti
- Music by: Pinar Toprak
- Production company: Wishing Well Pictures
- Release dates: March 26, 2015 (Gasparilla International Film Festival); September 11, 2015
- Running time: 95 minutes
- Country: United States
- Language: English

The Challenger is a 2015 American sports drama film written and directed by Kent Moran and executive produced by Michael Clarke Duncan, who also co-stars in his last feature film released three years after his death in 2012. Additionally, The Challenger features Kent Moran, S. Epatha Merkerson and Justin Hartley.

Filming began in January 2012 in The Bronx, New York, and the film was released domestically on September 11, 2015.

== Plot ==
With the help of legendary boxing trainer Duane Taylor, struggling Bronx auto mechanic Jaden Miller turns to boxing to save him and his mother (Merkerson) from living on the streets.

== Cast ==
- Kent Moran as Jaden "The Bronx Boy" Miller
- Michael Clarke Duncan as Duane Taylor
- S. Epatha Merkerson as Jada Miller
- Justin Hartley as James "Mr. Undefeatable" Burchard
- Frank Watson as Terrence
- Michael Rivera as Sanchez
- Rob Morgan as Frederick
- Stan Carp as Joe
- Robert Pike Daniel as Vincent
- Lindsay Hartley as Stephanie Burchard
- Natalie Carter as Aunt Regina
- Tristan Laurence Perez as Maxwell
- Bobby Roman as Manuel Rodriguez
- Vladimir Versailles as Alvin
- Ron Denson as Dereck Taylor
- Raushanah Simmons as Laurie
- Victor Pagan as Hector
- Ernie Sabella as Frankie
- Gurdeep Singh as Cashier
- Dion Mucciacito as Dr. Vargas
- Kelvin Hale as Commentator #1
- Jason Horowitz as Commentator #2
- Peter D. Michael as Commentator #3

== Production ==
The film was Kent Moran's directorial debut. He had previously starred in and produced Listen to Your Heart.

Filming began on January 17, 2012, in The Bronx, where the film takes place and wrapped on July 10, 2012.

== Release ==
The film was released domestically on September 11, 2015.

=== Festival circuit ===
Awards

- Gasparilla International Film Festival Audience Award Winner 2015
- Nashville Film Festival Audience Award Winner, 2nd Place 2015
- Nashville Film Festival Audience Award Winder, New Directors Competition 2015
- Palm Beach International Film Festival, Audience Award 2015

Placement

Portland Film Festival, Offshoot Film Festival, Great Cleveland Urban Film Festival, Montreal World Film Festival, Beverly Hills Film Festival, Nashville Film Festival, Gasparilla Film Festival, Rhode Island International Film Festival, Palm Beach International Film Festival, Julien Dubuque International Film Festival, Arizona International Film Festival, Dances with Films, Boston International Film Festival, Stony Brook Film Festival (Long Island)
