= Fourteen (film) =

2019 American film

- Film poster
- Directed by: Dan Sallitt
- Written by: Dan Sallitt
- Produced by: Caitlin Mae Burke; Graham Swon
- Starring: Tallie Medel; Norma Kuhling
- Cinematography: Christopher Messina
- Edited by: Dan Sallitt
- Production company: Static Productions
- Distributed by: Grasshopper Film
- Release dates: February 8, 2019 (Berlin); May 15, 2020 (Theatrical)
- Running time: 94 minutes
- Country: United States
- Language: English
- Budget: $95,000

Fourteen is a 2019 American independent film written and directed by Dan Sallitt. The film tracks a mentally ill woman's decline over the course of a decade as seen through her longtime best friend's eyes. It stars Tallie Medel and Norma Kuhling.

The film had its world premiere at the 69th Berlin International Film Festival on February 8, 2019, and was picked up for American distribution by Grasshopper Film.

== Plot ==
Mara is an aspiring writer who spends her days as a dedicated and slightly frustrated teacher's aid. Her main source of excitement is her childhood friend Jo, a freewheeling social worker who frequently calls upon Mara when she finds herself in some sort of self-inflicted crisis. It's a familiar routine and Mara knows her role; she is there to comfort Jo and extricate her from whatever new dramatic situation she has found herself in. The two women couldn't be more different from one another, but they have a lasting bond that appears to have united them through the ups and downs of friendship.

After Jo is fired from her latest job for regularly showing up late, she begins a downward spiral of depression and drugs that Mara has increasing difficulty understanding. The dynamic of their relationship shifts over a decade as the women's lives diverge, both moving through jobs and a rotating cast of boyfriends as Mara finds her footing and Jo stumbles.

== Cast ==
- Tallie Medel as Mara
- Norma Kuhling as Jo Mitchel
- C. Mason Wells as Adam, Mara's boyfriend
- Dylan McCormick as Conor, Jo's boyfriend
- Kolyn Brown as Leah, Mara's co-worker
- Willy McGee as Josh, Jo's boyfriend
- Caroline Luft as Mrs. Mitchel
- Strawn Bovee as Mara's mom

== Production ==
Fourteen is filmmaker and critic Dan Sallitt's fourth feature and his first film since The Unspeakable Act (2012), a gap of almost seven years. Sallitt was inspired by the work of French director Maurice Pialat, explaining that the film was made "under the sign of Pialat instead of Rohmer."

== Release ==
Fourteen premiered at the 2019 Berlin Film Festival. The film went on to garner positive reviews from various film festivals across Europe. A March or April film release was initially scheduled but was delayed due to the coronavirus pandemic.

== Reception ==
On review aggregation website Rotten Tomatoes, the film holds an approval rating of 98% based on 47 reviews, and an average rating of 7.6/10. The website's critics consensus reads: "Fourteen subtly establishes the bond between its main characters -- and the way longtime friendships can erode by a matter of nearly invisible degrees." On Metacritic, the film has a weighted average score of 79 out of 100, based on 16 critics, indicating "generally favorable" reviews.

Jamie Dunn of Sight & Sound wrote "Sallitt's thoughtful, incisive film articulates the feeling of an intense companionship fading imperceptibly over time, and shows such relationships to be just as complex, tempestuous and painful as those of the romantic variety." Ian Mantgani of Little White Lies praised it as "a wonderful, subtly devastating film from a voice in American independent cinema that will hopefully become better known." The Film Stage's Rory O'Connor called the film "a deep dive into the complexity and soft trauma of seeing those we idolized as kids through fresh eyes and what exactly to make of that new vantage."
