= The Ghost Who Walks (film) =

- Film poster
- Directed by: Cody Stokes
- Written by: Ben Bostick; Cody Stokes
- Starring: Garland Scott; Frank Mosley; Alexia Rasmussen
- Production company: Ghost Walkers
- Release date: July 21, 2019 (St. Louis Filmmakers Showcase)
- Running time: 106 minutes
- Country: United States
- Language: English

The Ghost Who Walks is a 2019 American action film directed by Cody Stokes. The film premiered on July 21, 2019 at the St. Louis Filmmakers Showcase.

== Plot ==
A man who has provided information to the authorities in exchange for an early release from prison seeks to stay one step ahead of vengeful gangsters while trying to reconnect with his former girlfriend and the daughter he has never met over the Christmas holidays.

== Production ==
The Ghost Who Walks was filmed in St. Louis in neighborhoods such as Dogtown, Soulard, and the Central West End. Shopping scenes were filmed at Chesterfield Mall in the suburb of Chesterfield, Missouri.

== Cast ==
- Garland Scott as Nolan
- Frank Mosley as Stitches
- Alexia Rasmussen as Lena
- Gil Darnell as Donnie
- Dasha Nekrasova as Mitzie
- Nattalyee Randall as Tanya
- Linda Kennedy as Dunya
- Peter Mayer as Monty

== Reception and recognition ==
Alex Saveliev of Film Threat wrote that "the end result doesn’t quite hold together." Dan Buffa of KMOV called it a "thrilling ride" but criticized the film for being slow.

The Ghost Who Walks won awards for Best Narrative Feature over 20 Minutes, Best Makeup/Hairstyling, Best Actor, Best Supporting Actor, and Best Supporting Actress at the St. Louis International Film Festival. It was also screened at Sidewalk Film Festival.

It streamed on Netflix in 2020 and was Netflix's eighth most-streamed movie in the United States around April 16, 2020.
