= Rhonda Hansome =

American comedian, writer, director, and actress

Rhonda Hansome is an American stand-up comedian, writer, director, and actress.

== Career ==
In 1975, Hansome was a puppeteer for the Muppet Vazh on Saturday Night Live. She has performed comedy before musical acts including Aretha Franklin and Diana Ross. She is known for discussing race in her comedy.

Hansome began her stand up comedy career as a way to earn money between acting roles, and by 1989 was performing regularly at colleges and clubs. She also performed comedy under the stage name Passion, including in a 1985 group comedy performance titled "Comedy Comes to Harlem" and later in "The Poet and the Preacher" at the Nuyorican Poets Café, and in 1997 in her own show "Last stop before dreadlocks".

Hansome is featured in Debra J. Robinson's 1984 documentary I Be Done Been Was Is about the obstacles faced in the careers four of black female stand-up comedians, Alice Arthur, Jane Galvin-Lewis, and Marsha Warfield.

In 1989, she appeared in the HBO comedy series First & Ten and the film 3,000.

In 2005, Hansome directed the play Sweet Songs of the Soul, starring Melba Moore. In 2006, she directed the play Real Black Men Don't Sit Cross-legged on the Floor: A Collage in Blues.

She also appears in Pretty Woman (1990) and Little Sister (2016).

== Selected filmography ==
- Getting Together (1976)
- I Be Done Been Was Is (1984)
- Pretty Woman (1990)
- 8:46 (2011)
- Murder on the A (2014) (Short)
- Little Sister (2016)

== Honors and awards ==
- 1986 Bistro Award Hall of Fame
- 2019 Anderson & Bert Cade Fulton Foundation Honoree, Longevity in Multi-disciplinary Artistic Achievement

== Personal life ==
Rhonda Hansome was born in New York. She is an African-American woman who attended a Catholic school. She met her white Jewish husband in the 1970s.
