= Melodie Sisk =

American film producer

Melodie Sisk is an Atlanta-based independent film producer and actress known for White Reindeer, The Ladies of the House, Summer of Blood, Little Sister, Social Animals and The Death of Dick Long for A24 Films.

Sisk was born in Bat Cave, North Carolina but raised mostly in Atlanta.

== Filmography ==
Key
†	Denotes films that have not yet been released

Year	Title	Acting Role	Notes
2001	Get Outta Here (short film)	Elizabeth Headreck	
2009	Modern Love Is Automatic	Lorraine Shultz	
2010	Vacation!	Dee-dee	Producer
2011	The Walken Dead (short film)	Couple	
2011	The Drama Department	Michelle	
2013	See You Next Tuesday		
2013	White Reindeer	Sweater Model	Producer
2014	The Ladies of the House	Getty	
2014	Summer of Blood	Blake	Producer
2014	Be With Me (The Notebook) (short film)	—	Producer
2015	Female Pervert	—	Producer
2015	Applesauce	Funeral Attendee	Producer
2016	Little Sister	—	Producer, writer (story by)
2016	The Great & The Small	—	Producer
2017	Commercial for the Queen of Meatloaf (short film)	—	Producer
2018	Social Animals	—	Producer
2018	Ms. Guidance (TV series)	Sheila	Producer, director
2019	The Death of Dick Long	—	Producer, Unit Production Manager
TBA	Open (short film) †	—	Producer
