= Brina Palencia =

American voice actress (born 1984)

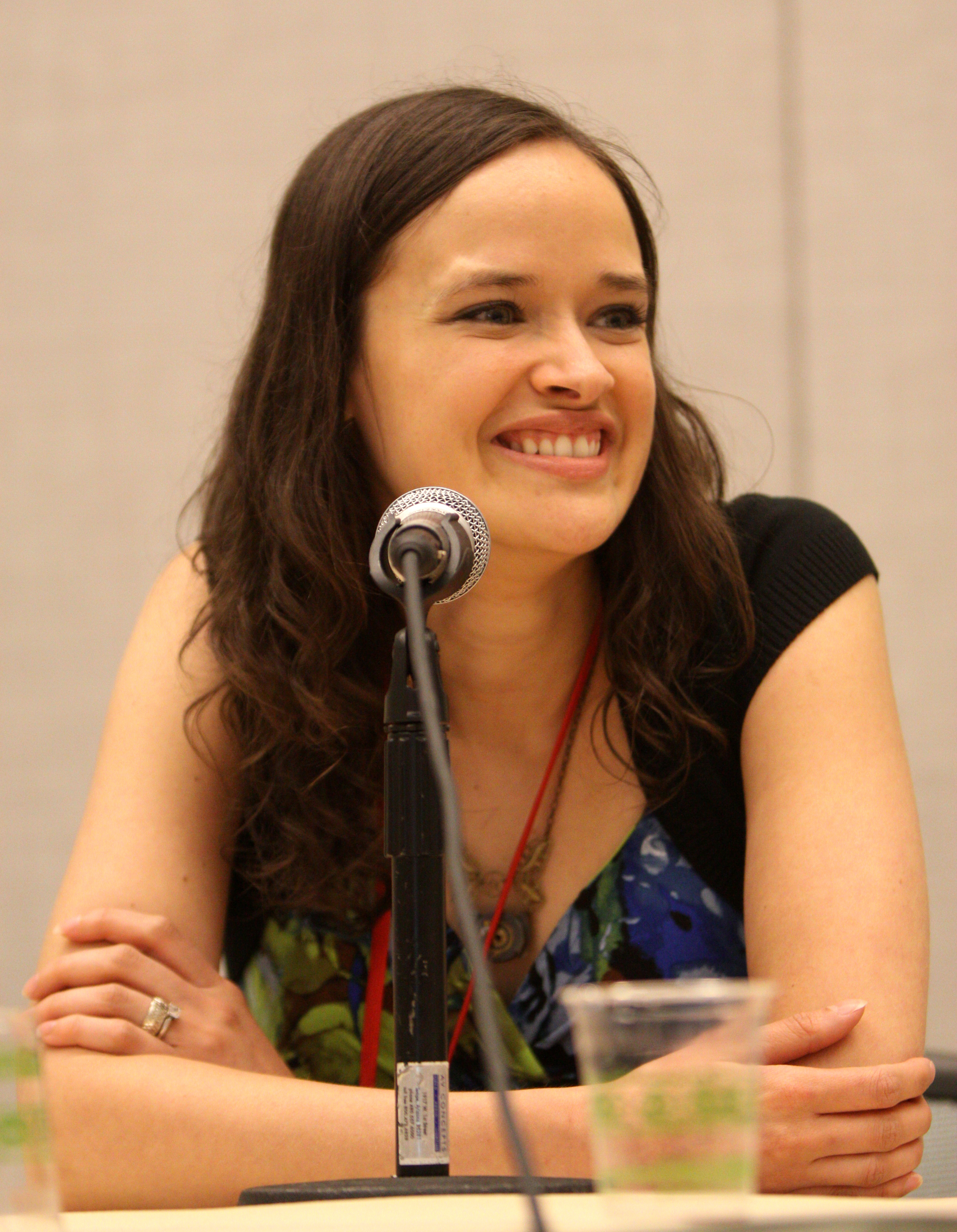
- Palencia in 2011
- Born: Brina Michelle Palencia; February 13, 1984 (age 42); Oklahoma City, Oklahoma, U.S.
- Education: University of North Texas (B.A.)
- Occupation: Actress
- Years active: 2004–present
- Agent: Atlas Talent Agency
- Spouse: Paul Wingo (m. 2013)
- Children: 1

Brina Michelle Palencia (born February 13, 1984) is an American voice actress. She has voiced a number of English-language versions of characters featured in anime.

== Biography ==
Palencia was born and raised in Oklahoma. As a child, she lived in Honduras until she was four. Throughout her childhood, she went back and forth between La Ceiba, Honduras and Owasso, Oklahoma.

She settled in Dallas, Texas and graduated from Weatherford High School in 2002. While studying at the University of North Texas, she was influenced by the anime series Dragon Ball Z. After graduating from UNT with a Bachelor of Arts in music in 2006, she began her career as a voice actress for Funimation. She was also a director, but eventually focused more on the acting side of the productions.

In her live-action work, she was the host of GameStop TV and has appeared in independent films, such as The Ladies of the House and Lumberjack Man. In 2014, she had a starring role as Roman's younger sister Sophia in The CW's science fiction romantic drama Star-Crossed. In 2017, she was credited with performing a parody version of Sarah McLachlan's "In the Arms of An Angel", titled "On the Wings of a Battmann," in a Cyanide & Happiness short of the same name.

== Personal life ==
Her brother, Gino Palencia, works at Crunchyroll as an ADR engineer. She is married to Paul Wingo. They live in Dallas and have a son.

== Filmography ==
=== Anime ===
List of dubbing performances in anime
Year	Title	Role	Notes	Source
2004	Fullmetal Alchemist	Nina Tucker		Press
2005	Aquarion	Silvia De Alisia		
2005	Gunslinger Girl	Elsa		Press
2006	Black Cat	Eve, Tearju Lunatique		
2006	Shin-chan	Georgie (Toru Kazama)	Funimation dub	Resume
2006	Tsukuyomi: Moon Phase			
2006	Black Blood Brothers	Yafuri Chao	ADR Director	
2007	Dragonaut: The Resonance	Akira Soya		
2007	Beck: Mongolian Chop Squad	Maho Minami		Resume
2007	Hell Girl	Ai Enma		Press
2007–present	One Piece	Tony Tony Chopper, Young Zoro (Ep. 19+), Carmen, Young Rongo, Chocolat (Fake Nami), Additional Voices	Funimation dub "Bon Voyage!" English ver. Vocalist "Memories" English ver. Vocalist	Press
2007	School Rumble	Mikoto Suou		
2007	Suzuka	Honoka Sakurai		
2007	Trinity Blood	Elise Wasmeyer	Ep. 2	Resume
2008	Darker Than Black	Yin		
2008	Rosario + Vampire series	Kurumu Kurono		Resume
2008	Sasami: Magical Girls Club	Tsukasa Takamine		
2008	xxxHolic	Moro, Zashiki-warashi	ADR Director	
2008–24	Black Butler	Ciel Phantomhive		
2008	School Rumble: Extra Class	Mikoto Suou	ADR Director	
2008	Claymore	Priscilla		
2009–2020	A Certain Scientific Railgun	Ruiko Saten	Also S and T	
2009	Nabari no Ou	Miharu Rokujo		Resume
2009	Rebuild of Evangelion film series	Rei Ayanami		
2009	Romeo × Juliet	Juliet		Resume
2009	Ouran High School Host Club	Shiro Takaoji		Resume
2009–24	Spice and Wolf	Holo	Also Spice & Wolf: merchant meets the wise wolf	
2009	Sgt. Frog	Tamama		
2009	The Tower of Druaga	Ahmey		Resume
2010	Dragon Ball Z Kai	Chiaotzu, Puar	Funimation dub	Resume
2010	Fullmetal Alchemist: Brotherhood	Nina Tucker		
2010	Sekirei	Sahashi Yukari		Resume
2010	Hetalia: Axis Powers	Chibitalia		
2011	Chrome Shelled Regios	Nina Antalk		
2012–19	Fairy Tail	Juvia Lockser		
2011	Future Diary	Yuno Gasai (2nd)		
2011	Ga-Rei: Zero	Kazuhiro Mitogawa		Resume
2011	Summer Wars	Natsuki Shinohara		Resume
2012	Aquarion Evol	Mikono Suzushiro		
2012	C – Control – The Money and Soul of Possibility	MSHYU		
2012	Ōkami-san and Her Seven Companions	Ryoko Okami		
2012	Fractale	Clain		
2012	King of Thorn	Kasumi Ishiki		
2012	Shakugan no Shana series	Kazumi Yoshida	Season 2-3	Resume
2012	Steins;Gate	Nae Tennoji		
2013	Good Luck Girl!	Ichiko Sakura		
2014–19	Tokyo Ghoul series	Touka Kirishima	Also √A and :re	
2014	Robotics;Notes	Nae		
2014	Psycho-Pass	Rikako Oroyo		Resume
2015-16	Durarara!!	Vorona		Resume
2016	Snow White with the Red Hair	Shirayuki		
2016–25	My Hero Academia	Minoru Mineta		
2016	Danganronpa 3: Despair Arc	Ibuki Mioda		
2017	Dragon Ball Super	Puar, Chiaotzu, Arale Norimaki		
2017	Aria the Scarlet Ammo AA	Shirayuki Hotogi		
2017	Sakura Quest	Ririko		
2017	Hyouka	Kochi		
2018	Hinamatsuri	Hina		
2018	Zombie Land Saga	Sakura Minamoto	ADR Song Director, ADR Lyric Adaptation, ADR Song Arrangement	
2019-21	Fruits Basket	Isuzu Soma	2019 reboot	
2021	The Case Study of Vanitas	Chloé d'Apchier		
2024	Fairy Tail: 100 Years Quest	Juvia Lockser		
2025	Zenshu	Magical Girl		

=== Film ===
List of dubbing performances in direct-to-video, feature and television films
Year	Title	Role	Notes	Source
2009	xxxHolic: A Midsummer Night's Dream	Moro	ADR Director	
2009	Summer Wars	Natsuki Shinohara		
2013	One Piece Film: Strong World	Tony Tony Chopper		
2013	Fairy Tail the Movie: Phoenix Priestess	Juvia Lockser		
2014	One Piece Film: Z	Tony Tony Chopper		
2014	Dragon Ball Z: Battle of Gods	Chiaotzu, Puar		Resume
2017	One Piece Film: Gold	Tony Tony Chopper		
2017	Black Butler: Book of the Atlantic	Ciel Phantomhive		
2017	Fairy Tail: Dragon Cry	Juvia Lockser		
2017	Napping Princess	Kokone		
2018	My Hero Academia: Two Heroes	Minoru Mineta		
2018	Fate/Stay Night: Heaven's Feel	Ayako Mitsuzuri		
2019	Dragon Ball Super: Broly	Broly (Young), Ba		
2019	One Piece: Stampede	Tony Tony Chopper		
2019	My Hero Academia: Heroes Rising	Minoru Mineta		Resume
2021	My Hero Academia: World Heroes' Mission	Minoru Mineta		
2022	Sing a Bit of Harmony		ADR Music Director	
2022	One Piece Film: Red	Tony Tony Chopper		
2024	My Hero Academia: You're Next	Minoru Mineta		

=== Video games ===
List of voice and dubbing performances in video games
Year	Title	Role	Notes	Source
2006	Super Dragon Ball Z	Videl		
2006	Dragon Ball Z: Budokai Tenkaichi 2	Bulla, Ghost Usher		
2007	Guitar Hero 3	Singer, others		Resume
2007	Dragon Ball Z: Budokai Tenkaichi 3	Arale Norimaki, Chiaotzu, Puar		
2008	One Piece: Unlimited Adventure	Tony Tony Chopper		
2008	Final Fantasy Fables: Chocobo's Dungeon	Moogle		Press
2008	Guitar Hero 4	Singer, others		Resume
2008	Dragon Ball: Origins	Puar		
2008	Mushroom Men	Pax		Resume
2009	The Maw	Frank		Resume
2009	Lux-Pain	Rui Yamase, Lil	ADR Director	
2009	Dragon Ball: Revenge of King Piccolo	Chiaotzu		
2009–19	Borderlands series	Mad Moxxi		
2009	Dragon Ball: Raging Blast	Chiaotzu		
2009	Ghostbusters: The Video Game	Additional Voices		
2010	Dragon Ball: Origins 2	Arale Norimaki		
2010	Donkey Kong Country Returns	Various		Resume
2010	Comic Jumper: The Adventures of Captain Smiley	Gerda, Paper Lad		Resume
2010	Dragon Ball Z: Tenkaichi Tag Team	Chiaotzu		
2010	Dragon Ball: Raging Blast 2	Chiaotzu		
2011	Monster Tale	Ellie		
2011	Duke Nukem Forever	Miso, Chasity		Resume
2013	The Walking Dead: Survival Instinct	Various		Resume
2013	Dead or Alive 5 Ultimate	Nyotengu	Also in Last Round	Tweet
2014	Smite	Artemis, Cupid		
2014	Tales of Xillia 2	Elle Mel Marta		
2016	Battleborn	Mellka		Tweet
2017	Fire Emblem Heroes	Ayra, Lute		
2018	Dragon Ball FighterZ	Chiaotzu		
2018	Dragon Ball Legends	Chiaotzu		
2019	Dead or Alive 6	Nyotengu		
2020	Dragon Ball Z: Kakarot	Chiaotzu, Puar, Arale Norimaki		
2025	Marvel's Deadpool VR	Lady Deadpool		

=== Live-action ===
List of acting performances in film and television
Year	Title	Role	Notes	Source
2010	The Good Guys	Krista	Episode: "The Whistleblower"	Resume
2011	Chase	Renee	Episode: "Father Figure"	
2013	The Walking Dead	Ana	Episode: "Indifference"	Resume
2013	Upstream Color	Woman in Club		
2014	Star-Crossed	Sophia	12 episodes	
2014	The Ladies of the House	Crystal		
2015	Castle	Jody Evans	Episode: "Habeas Corpse"	Resume
2015	Lumberjack Man	LuAnn Potts		
2023	Ultraman Z	Pega	(English Dub)	
