= Social Animals (2018 comedy film) =

- Theatrical release poster
- Directed by: Theresa Bennett
- Written by: Theresa Bennett
- Produced by: Theresa Bennett; Ash Christian; Coleman Lannum; Mark L. Lester; Melodie Sisk; Monte Zajicek
- Starring: Noël Wells; Josh Radnor; Aya Cash; Carly Chaikin; Fortune Feimster; Samira Wiley
- Cinematography: Sandra Valde-Hansen
- Edited by: Yaniv Dabach; Jonathan Melin
- Music by: Greg Bernall
- Production companies: Cranum Entertainment; Aquite Media; Titan Global
- Distributed by: Paramount Pictures
- Release date: June 1, 2018
- Country: United States
- Language: English

Social Animals is a 2018 American comedy film, written, and directed by Theresa Bennett in her directorial debut. It stars Noël Wells, Josh Radnor, Aya Cash, Carly Chaikin, Fortune Feimster, and Samira Wiley.

The film was released in a limited release and through video on demand on June 1, 2018, by Paramount Pictures.

== Plot ==
Zoe is an almost 30-year-old woman who owns an unsuccessful waxing business on the same street as Paul's adult video store. She lives in a tiny home on her landlord's land, but is unable to pay her rent in a timely manner. She takes a Polaroid of every person that she has sex with.

Paul's marriage is struggling. Jane, his wife, is a serious lawyer and supports their family. As they haven't had sex in three months, she suggests that he have an affair, leaving him confused and the idea rejected.

Zoe attends a friend Lana's wedding and sees Paul there. The pair later speak when she visits his store. After meeting Zoe, Paul expresses interest in the affair idea to Jane. Jane is also attempting to have sexual rendezvous but each time gets emotional ends up crying.

Zoe meets Paul after attending Lana's baby shower but is overwhelmed by the fact that he has three kids, so has sex with the bartender there instead. Jane and Paul continue to have moments that appear to promise sexual reconciliation, yet Jane backs out each time. Paul and Zoe do continue seeing each other and build a rapport, eventually having sex. Zoe's best friend Claire points out that Zoe had waited longer to sleep with him than is usual. After having the sex, Zoe reflects on how Paul has three kids and a wife, and feels baited by him. He consoles her; however, she remains conflicted.

Jane goes by Zoe's store to book a waxing appointment out of curiosity, feeling she is the one who Paul's sleeping with. She is passive and reveals that Lana and her husband are already having problems and that he has been cheating on her. Jane breaks down crying, revealing she's been having panic attacks regularly. Embarrassed, she quickly leaves after the appointment is finished.

Some time later, Lana has given birth to a baby and invites Zoe, Paul, Jane, Claire, and Claire's fiancé Justin over for dinner. Paul's aggressive comments about Jane's parenting advice create tension. Jane responds to the awkwardness with comments on Paul's work ethic not leading him to be the primary provider for their family. Following the dinner, Zoe ends all contact with Paul. Jane later reveals to Paul she had paid someone to have sex with her.

After their son goes missing, Jane and Paul lay their respective frustrations on each other. Jane feels she did her best so is very disappointed in her “shitty wife” reputation. Paul snaps back, saying her honesty is merely used to hurt people.

Zoe decides to view life more optimistically and hosts an event to promote her business. After riling the crowd up, they go to smash the window of her biggest competitor but she's promptly arrested. Claire bails her out, but is frustrated with Zoe's irresponsibility, especially after Zoe doesn't have a plan to pay Claire back for the bail. She tells her to grow up and stop reveling in her own pity party.

Paul moves out of his home with Jane and the lease on his store ends as well. Zoe gets her job back at Beer Land and pays Claire back and the two reconcile their friendship. Paul plans an elaborate night to reconcile with Zoe and is successful. The pair begin dating again. Jane moves into a new apartment with the kids and decides to let loose more and live according to her own standards versus everyone else's.

The film ends with each character having found more comfort in themselves and more confidence in their relationships.

== Cast ==
- Noël Wells as Zoe
- Josh Radnor as Paul
- Aya Cash as Jane
- Carly Chaikin as Claire
- Fortune Feimster as Sarah-Beth
- Samira Wiley as Lana
- Adam Shapiro as Justin
- Rico LeBron as Fernando

== Production ==
In September 2016, it was announced Noël Wells, Josh Radnor, Aya Cash, Fortune Feimster and Carly Chaikin had been cast in the film, with Theresa Bennett directing, from a screenplay she wrote. Ash Christian, Melodie Sick, Coleman Lannum, Mark L. Lester, will produce the film under their Cranium Entertainment, BondIt, and Titan Global banners, respectively, while Mason Novick, Michelle Knudsen, Jeff Sackman, Berry Meyerowitz, Matthew Helderman, Seán Eric Burleson, Gabriel Casey, Luke Dylan Taylor, Sean Patrick O’Reilly, Jon Wroblewski and Summer Finley will serve as executive producers. In October 2016, Samira Wiley joined the cast of the film.

Principal photography began in September 2016, in Austin, Texas.

== Release ==
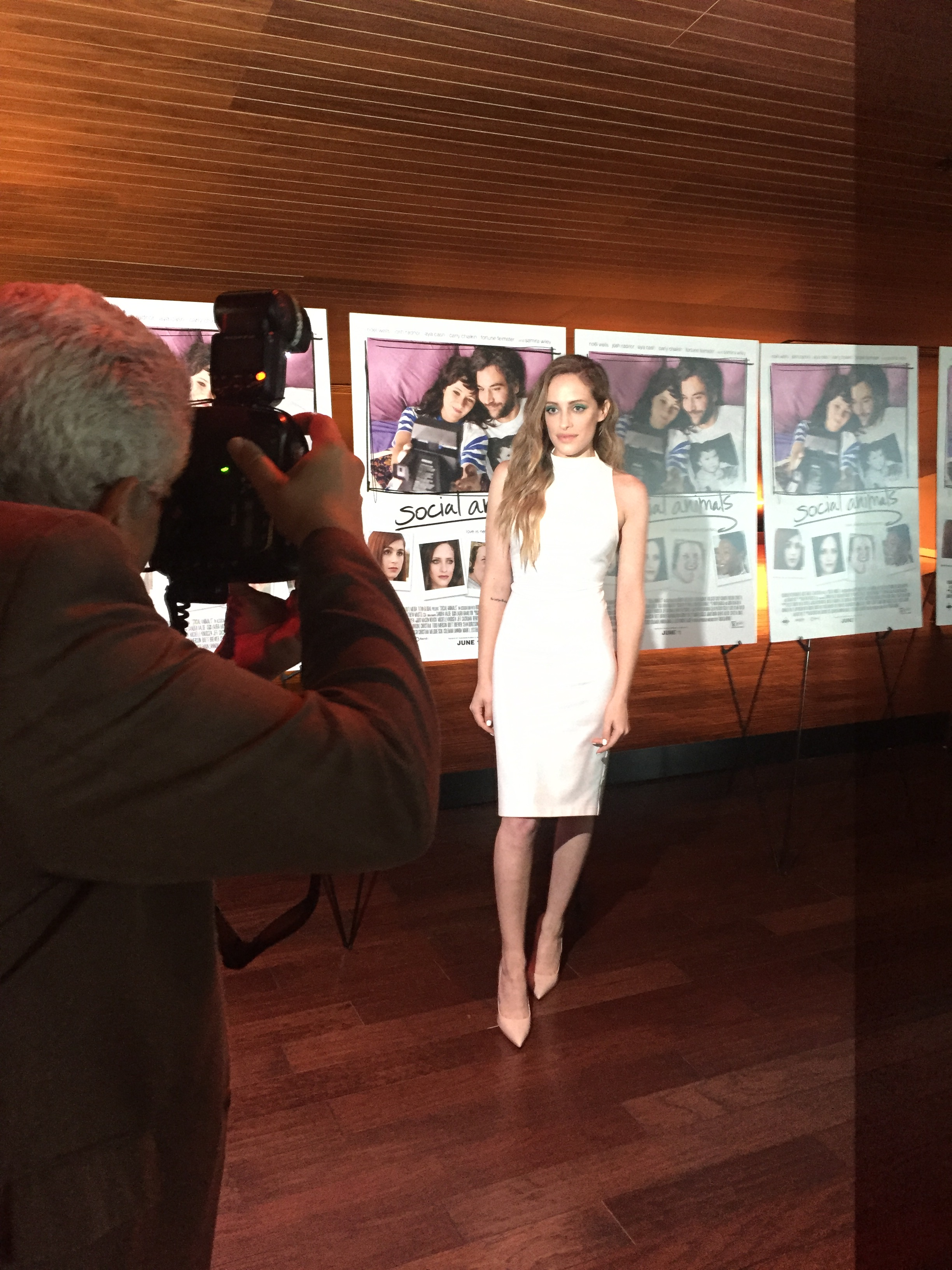
Carly Chaikin at the Premiere

The film was released in a limited release and through video on demand on June 1, 2018, by Paramount Pictures.

== Critical reception ==
Social Animals received mixed reviews from film critics. It holds a 64% approval rating on review aggregator website Rotten Tomatoes, based on 11 reviews, with an average of 5.4/10. On Metacritic, the film holds a rating of 37 out of 100, based on four critics, indicating "generally unfavorable reviews".
