= White Reindeer (2013 film) =

- Directed by: Zach Clark
- Written by: Zach Clark
- Produced by: Zach Clark; Daryl Pittman; Melodie Sisk
- Starring: Anna Margaret Hollyman; Laura Lemar-Goldsborough; Joe Swanberg; Nathan Williams; Chris Doubek; Melodie Sisk
- Cinematography: Daryl Pittman
- Edited by: Zach Clark
- Music by: Fritz Myers
- Production company: Candy Castle Motion Pictures
- Distributed by: IFC Films
- Release dates: March 11, 2013 (SXSW); December 6, 2013
- Running time: 82 minutes
- Country: United States
- Language: English

White Reindeer is a 2013 American dark comedy film written and directed by Zach Clark. The film stars Anna Margaret Hollyman as a real estate agent who must deal with the recent death of her husband as the holidays approach. Also appearing are Laura Lemar-Goldsborough, Joe Swanberg, Nathan Williams, Chris Doubek, and Melodie Sisk.

== Plot ==
Suzanne is a successful realtor living in the suburbs of Washington, D.C., with her weatherman husband Jeff. With Christmas just a month away, Suzanne and Jeff celebrate an imminent move to Hawaii; things can't be better with Suzanne as she giddily anticipates the move and her favorite time of year. However, after coming home one day to find her husband brutally murdered, Suzanne's life becomes filled with overwhelming grief.

A few days later, a get-together is held at Suzanne's house with friends and family following Jeff's funeral. During this time, a co-worker of Jeff's approaches Suzanne in tears. After finding privacy in the bathroom, the co-worker explains to Suzanne that Jeff was involved for a long time with a young stripper named Autumn. Surprised by the story, Suzanne later goes to the household computer and logs on under Jeff's user. Under the history tab of his web browser, Suzanne finds that Jeff had visited sites of ethnic pornography.

Following the tragedy, Suzanne takes off from work per suggestion of her colleagues. During this time, she tracks down the stripper, whose real name is Fantasia, and the two begin to bond over their mutual loss. Through her relationship with Fantasia, Suzanne begins to cut loose – joining the stripper on escapades of clubbing and shoplifting.

== Cast ==
- Anna Margaret Hollyman as Suzanne Barrington
- Laura Lemar-Goldsborough as Fantasia
- Fernanda Tapia as Fresca
- Lydia Hyslop as Patti
- Joe Swanberg as George
- Chris Doubek as Detective Ross
- Nathan Williams as Jeff Barrington

== Production ==
On August 25, 2011, director Zach Clark launched a fundraising campaign to produce his fourth feature film, titled White Reindeer, through Kickstarter. After 52 days of fundraising, the film met its pledged goal of $33,500. The Kickstarter funds made up half of the production budget, while the rest of the film was paid for out-of-pocket by the producers. The film was shot with the Red Epic camera.

== Release and reception ==
White Reindeer premiered at the South by Southwest 2013, and subsequently screened within such festivals as Maryland Film Festival. On September 30, 2013, the film's North American rights were acquired by IFC Films. The film subsequently opened at the IFC Center in New York City on December 6, 2013. The film had its digital and on-demand release on the same day.

=== Critical response ===
White Reindeer was well received by critics upon release. Review aggregator Rotten Tomatoes reports that 90% of 31 film critics have given the film a positive review, with an average rating of 6.7/10. Metacritic, which assigns a weighted average score out of 100 to reviews from mainstream critics, gives the film a score of 69 based on 16 reviews.

Alan Scherstuhl of The Village Voice gave the film a positive review saying, "Clark and Hollyman know not to suggest that Suzanne has healed, or even that everything will be all right for her. [...] Congratulations to them for their courage – there's radiance in White Reindeer's darkness, which is what winter solstice festivals have always been about in the first place." Jeannette Catsoulis of The New York Times called the film "a cool, kinky tale of sudden bereavement, sexual adventure and hard-won hope."

== See also ==
- List of Christmas films
