= All the Ships at Sea =

Indie drama film by Dan Sallitt

- Directed by: Dan Sallitt
- Written by: Dan Sallitt
- Produced by: Julie Spiegel
- Starring: Strawn Bovee; Edith Meeks
- Cinematography: Duraid Munajim
- Edited by: Dan Sallitt
- Production company: Static Productions
- Distributed by: Grasshopper Film
- Release date: February 7, 2004 (Magnolia Independent Film Festival)
- Running time: 64 minutes
- Country: United States
- Language: English

All the Ships at Sea is a 2004 American independent drama film directed by Dan Sallitt.

== Synopsis ==
A professor of theology, named Evelyn (Strawn Bovee), and her sister Virginia (Edith Meeks), reunite to discuss their past experiences and what having religious beliefs means to them.

== Cast ==
- Strawn Bovee as Evelyn
- Edith Meeks as Virginia
- Dylan McCormick as Joseph
- Lois Raebeck as Ann
- Walt Witcover as John
- Megan Yelland as Waitress
- Gary Bryden as Trucker

== Reception ==
In a positive review for Variety, Scott Foundas said, "To encounter characters this authentically self-aware and introspective in an American film is rare, and pic heightens the effect by keeping the camera motionless and shooting in uncluttered, tableau-like close-ups and two-shots, putting Evelyn and Virginia front and center almost the entire time."

In a retrospective of Sallitt's films, Dana Stevens of Slate wrote about All the Ships at Sea, saying, "The encounter of these two women makes for a philosophically rich, emotionally naked chamber piece that’s reminiscent of Bergman films like Persona or Through the Glass Darkly."
