= Kent Moran =

American actor

- Born: June 12, 1982 (age 43); New York City, New York, U.S.
- Occupations: Actor, director
- Years active: 2007–present
- Spouse: Kat Moran (m. 2018)
- Children: 2

Kent Moran is an American actor/filmmaker best known for his roles in Listen to Your Heart and The Challenger.

== Personal life ==
Moran was born on June 12, 1982, in New York City and raised in Greenwich, Connecticut, with his younger brother Luke and older brothers, Clay and Fred. Kent is an alumnus of Rye Country Day School and Lehigh University, and currently resides in Los Angeles. His younger brother, Luke Moran, is also an actor.

== Career ==
After college, Moran moved to New York City to pursue acting and music. For the year that Moran was in New York, he was one of the lead singers of an R&B group as well as a singer/songwriter. Moran's first principal role in a movie came as a football player in Julie Taymor's Across the Universe. He then was cast as James Dean in Guy Guido's documentary Icons. After doing several commercials, short films, and a small role on As the World Turns, Moran moved to Los Angeles.

In Los Angeles, Moran studied under numerous acting coaches, including Suzanne Kent, founder of the Groundlings. Moran was cast as James Dean twice more: once in an Armstrong Flooring advertising campaign, which is featured on The Ads of the World website, and again in a European Mercedes GLK commercial cast by Vickie Thomas. Moran also landed another small role on The Bold and the Beautiful. In 2008, after the writer's strike, Moran started Wishing Well Pictures, an independent film production company. Soon after, he wrote Listen to Your Heart, which became Wishing Well Pictures' debut film. It was also Moran's debut starring role in a movie and his first time as a producer and second unit director. Moran also wrote the original music and score for the movie which can be found on the soundtrack. Listen to Your Heart became one of the first movies ever to screen outside in the middle of Times Square as part of the New York City International Film Festival, where Moran was nominated for Best Actor. Listen to Your Heart went on to win 15 awards at film festivals across the country and was distributed through Warner Brothers, Gravitas Ventures, and Vision Films.

Moran wrote and directed several short films in between his features. In 2011, Moran was cast in one of the lead roles in Regret, a psychological thriller shot in Portugal. In 2012, Kent wrote and starred in his directorial debut, The Challenger, where he stars opposite Michael Clarke Duncan, S. Epatha Merkerson, and Justin Hartley. The Challenger was Duncan's final on-screen role. It won several awards at top film festivals across the country and secured a direct deal with Regal Cinemas for a US Theatrical Release. The Challenger comes in out in US theaters on September 11, 2015. As an actor, Kent also had cameo roles in the movie Contest in 2013 and the popular web series Keith Broke His Leg in 2015. He co-produced the festival favorite My Name Is David and released an EP of original songs entitled Better Left Said in 2014. Kent continues to act while developing projects under the Wishing Well Pictures label.

== Filmography ==
Film
Year	Title	Role	Notes
2007	Across the Universe	Football Player	Principal
2010	Without Jill		Short film Writer, producer, and director
2010	Down on the Ground	Adam	Short film Producer, director, writer and actor
2010	Catch		Short film Executive producer
2010	Listen to Your Heart	Danny	Actor, writer, producer, composer, and second unit director Nominated – Best Actor, New York City International Film Festival
2012	Regret	Patrick	
2013	Contest	Unknown Role	Actor
2015	The Challenger	Jaden "The Bronx Boy" Miller	Actor, writer, director, producer and composer
2015	My Name is David		Co-producer
2018	The Cloverfield Paradox	Unknown Role	
2019	Madonna and the Breakfast Club		Co-producer

Television
Year	Title	Role	Notes
2006	The Sopranos	Party Goer, Extra	Episode: "Johnny Cakes"
2007	As the World Turns	Dorm Guy, Extra	Episode #1.12948
2007	The Bold and the Beautiful	Room Service Waiter, Extra	Episode 1.5185
2015	Keith Broke His Leg	Unknown Role	
2021	Redemption in Cherry Springs	Dominic	

== Awards ==
Year	Group	Award	Result	Notes
2009	Action on Film International Film Festival	Screenwriting (Alan J. Bailey Award)	Winner	Listen to Your Heart
2010	Action on Film International Film Festival	Best Picture	Winner	Listen to Your Heart
2010	Action on Film International Film Festival	Best Produced Screenplay	Nominated	Listen to Your Heart
2010	Daytona Beach Film Festival	Audience Award	Winner	Listen to Your Heart
2010	Fort Lauderdale Film Festival	Audience Award	Winner	Listen to Your Heart
2010	Los Angeles International Film Festival of Hollywood	Best Narrative Feature (Merit Award)	Winner	Listen to Your Heart
2010	New York City International Film Festival	People's Choice	Winner	Listen to Your Heart
2010	North Country Film Festival	Audience Award	Winner	Listen to Your Heart
2010	Offshoot Film Festival	Best Overall Film	Winner	Listen to Your Heart
2010	Rhode Island International Film Festival	Audience Award – Best Feature	Winner	Listen to Your Heart
2010	Salem Film Festival	Best Drama	Winner	Listen to Your Heart
2010	Temecula Valley International Film Festival	Audience Award	Winner	Listen to Your Heart
2010	Withoutabox Written Word Award	Best New Writer	Nominated	Listen to Your Heart
2011	Amelia Island Film Festival	Audience Award	Winner	Listen to Your Heart
2011	Fallbrook Film Festival	Audience Award	Winner	Listen to Your Heart
2011	Lake Arrowhead Film Festival	Music and Magic of Movies Award	Winner	Listen to Your Heart
2015	Gasparilla International Film Festival	Audience Award	Winner	The Challenger
2015	Nashville Film Festival	Audience Award Winner	2nd Place	The Challenger
2015	Nashville Film Festival	Audience Award Winner, New Directors Competition	Winner	The Challenger
2015	Palm Beach Film Festival	Audience Award	Winner	The Challenger
