= Boys of Abu Ghraib =

2014 film by Luke Moran

- Theatrical release poster
- Directed by: Luke Moran
- Screenplay by: Luke Moran
- Produced by: Luke Moran; Cru Ennis
- Starring: Sean Astin; Luke Moran; Omid Abtahi; Sara Paxton; John Heard
- Cinematography: Peter Holland
- Edited by: Jeff Fullmer; Luca Disica
- Music by: Dan Marocco
- Production company: Rebel One Pictures
- Distributed by: Vertical Entertainment
- Release date: March 28, 2014
- Running time: 102 minutes
- Country: United States
- Language: English

Boys of Abu Ghraib is a 2014 American war film inspired by the events that took place at the Abu Ghraib prison in Baghdad, Iraq in 2003, in the background of the Iraq war. It was written and directed by Luke Moran, who co-stars alongside Sean Astin, Omid Abtahi, Sara Paxton, and John Heard. Filmmakers Edward Zwick and Marshall Herskovitz served as executive producers on the film, which was produced by Luke Moran and Cru Ennis.

== Plot ==
The film starts in 2003, the day before 22-year-old Jack Farmer (Luke Moran) ships out for Iraq, having joined the Army Reserves in hopes of being part of something bigger than himself.

He and dozens of other young men arrive at Abu Ghraib, a prison located 20 miles from Baghdad. CO Capt. Hayes (Scott Patterson) greets them with a rousing speech about them standing on the front lines of the war against terrorism, but the poor living conditions and boredom begin to wear on the soldiers. Jack requests MP duty, undaunted by the cautionary tale of an earlier volunteer who had the same idea and wound up shooting himself in the foot to escape. With no training, briefing or idea what to expect, Jack is transferred to "Hard Site", a cell block that supposedly houses hardcore terrorists. His new boss, Sgt. Tanner (Sean Astin), tells him that the Hard Site's guiding principle is "no compassion"; their job is to "soften up" prisoners for military interrogators. This includes tactics like sensory deprivation, humiliation and isolation.

Jack has his reservations about the treatment of detainees at the prison. He strikes up a friendship with one of the detainees Ghazi Hammoud (Omid Abtahi), a London-educated engineer. Just days before they were scheduled to return home, Jack and his unit learned that their tour of duty has been extended by six months. They are devastated but continue their day to day duties. Hammoud is subjected to multiple rough interrogations. The guards shackle him to the cell so he is forced to stand and tell Jack to "let him shit himself". When Jack finally confronts his fellow soldiers, defending Hammoud's innocence, he learns that Hammoud has confessed to building a bomb that killed 18 civilians in a coffee shop. Jack confronts Hammoud asking if he killed "innocent people" to which Hammoud replies that they were not innocent. Jack breaks down and subsequently adopts a more aggressive posture, treating the detainees less kindly than he had prior to Hammoud's confession.

When it is finally time for Jack to go home, he briefs the soldier set to replace him, much like Tanner had briefed him. His replacement takes out a camera and snaps a photo, but Jack tells him to put the camera away. When Jack notices Hammoud has fallen asleep, he drags him out of the cell and begins yelling at him. Unknown to Jack, the second soldier snaps another picture. After returning home to the US, Jack sees the news coverage of the Abu Ghraib scandal breaking on live TV, with the pictures snapped of him as he is shopping at a local store with his girlfriend.

== Cast ==
- Luke Moran as Jack Farmer
- Sean Astin as Staff Sergeant Tanner
- Omid Abtahi as Ghazi Hammoud
- Sara Paxton as Peyton
- John Heard as Sam Farmer
- Michael Welch as Eugene "Pits" Fowler
- Elijah Kelley as Babatunde "Tunde" Ogundule
- John Robinson as Ryan Fox
- Scott Patterson as Captain Hayes
- Cru Ennis as Shaw
- Jerry Hernandez as Rodeo
- Kylie Rogers as Daughter

== Production ==
The shooting occurred in Santa Fe, New Mexico at the Penitentiary of New Mexico, the location of the New Mexico State Penitentiary riot. One scene was also shot at the now closed Baillios Electronics in Santa Fe, New Mexico.

== Release ==
=== Theatrical ===
The film premiered to U.S. theaters on March 28, 2014.

=== Home video ===
It was released on DVD on April 15, 2014 by ANConnect. It was released on Blu-Ray on May 9, 2017.

== Reception ==
Some critics criticized the film for not depicting the exact events of the scandal, but fictionalizing a story based on these events, while other appreciated the story and its one-step-at-a-time explanation of how an event like this actually came to pass. Audience reviews were more positive, most particularly from veterans for its realistic depiction of a soldier's deployment and its lack of a political agenda. The film won the Audience Award at the Gasparilla Film Festival and the War on Screen International Film Festival, the only two film festivals it screened at.
