= Tallie Medel =

American actress

- Born: Ketchikan, Alaska, U.S.
- Education: Emerson College
- Occupation: Actor

Tallie Medel is an American actor. They are best known for their supporting role in the Academy Award-winning film Everything Everywhere All at Once (2022).

== Early life ==
Medel was born and raised in Ketchikan, Alaska, and studied acting and theater education at Emerson College.

Medel is half Mexican.

== Personal life ==
Medel is non-binary and uses they/them pronouns.

== Filmography ==
=== Film ===
Year	Title	Role	Notes
2012	The Unspeakable Act	Jackie Kimball	
2014	Joy Kevin	Joy	
2014	Uncertain Terms	Jean	
2015	Stinking Heaven	Courtney	
2015	Valedictorian	Kay	
2015	Abby Singer/Songwriter	Vampire Girl	
2016	Little Sister	Performance Art Dancer	
2016	The Arbalest	Sylvia Frank	
2017	Sylvio	Maggie	
2018	Notes on an Appearance	Madeleine	
2018	Jules of Light and Dark	Maya	
2019	Fourteen	Mara	
2020	The Carnivores	Alice	Also writer
2022	Everything Everywhere All at Once	Becky Sregor	

=== Television ===
Year	Title	Role	Notes
2012, 2018	The Chris Gethard Show	Various roles	2 episodes
2015	Pursuit of Sexiness	Dancer	Episode: "Homeless Garbage Monster"
2015	Inside Amy Schumer	Frankie	Episode: "Babies & Bustiers"
2015–2018	The Special Without Brett Davis	Various roles	7 episodes
2017	Rachel Dratch's Late Night Snack	Tallie	Episode: "MUTHA: I'm Not Invisible"
2018	Brooklynification	Amy	2 episodes
