= The Carnivores =

- Directed by: Caleb Michael Johnson
- Written by: Caleb Michael Johnson; Jeff Bay Smith
- Produced by: Ted Speaker; Caleb Johnson; Thomas Fernandes; Alan J. Minnick; Heather Johnson; Jeff Bay Smith
- Starring: Lindsay Burdge; Tallie Medel; Frank Mosley
- Cinematography: Caleb Michael Johnson; Adam J. Minnick
- Edited by: Caleb Michael Johnson
- Music by: Curtis Heath
- Production company: Silver Spectral Pictures
- Distributed by: Dark Sky Films
- Release date: March 14, 2020 (Austin)
- Running time: 77 minutes
- Country: United States
- Language: English

The Carnivores is a 2020 American thriller comedy drama film written by Caleb Michael Johnson and Jeff Bay Smith, directed by Johnson and starring Lindsay Burdge, Tallie Medel and Frank Mosley.

== Cast ==
- Lindsay Burdge as Bret
- Tallie Medel as Alice
- Frank Mosley as Dog-Man
- Vincent James Prendergast as Roland
- Thomas Fernandes as Postal Manager
- Jason Newman as Veterinarian

== Release ==
The film premiered at a "private event" in Austin, Texas on March 14, 2020.

== Reception ==
The film has an 80% rating on Rotten Tomatoes based on 20 reviews.

Chuck Bowen of Slant Magazine awarded the film three stars out of four and wrote, "The characters don’t exist solely to affirm the film’s various themes, and as a result, their humanity gets under your skin."

Brian Tallerico of RogerEbert.com gave the film a positive review and wrote, "...there’s something daring and memorable about Johnson’s vision of possible mental illness and marital strife."

Joe Leydon of Variety gave the film a positive review and wrote, "Caleb Michael Johnson’s psychological thriller pivots on the possibility of love as a kind of all-consuming madness."

Marc Savlov of The Austin Chronicle awarded the film three and a half stars out of five and wrote, "...Medel’s perfectly raw and queasily realistic performance of an already insecure mind coming wholly unhinged, and cinematographer Adam J. Minnick’s canted camera setups and dreamy-dreary color palette, The Carnivores is a slow burning bad dream."

Alex Saveliev of Film Threat rated the film a 7 out of 10 and wrote, "Filled with non-sequiturs, abrupt cuts, and nightmarish interludes, The Carnivores is not without its moments of humor."
