= The Unspeakable Act =

- Theatrical release poster
- Directed by: Dan Sallitt
- Written by: Dan Sallitt
- Produced by: Shari Berman; Ania Trzebiatowska; Jaime Christley
- Starring: Tallie Medel; Sky Hirschkron; Aundrea Fares; Kati Schwartz; Caroline Luft
- Cinematography: Duraid Munajim
- Edited by: Dan Sallitt
- Production company: Static Productions
- Distributed by: The Cinema Guild
- Release dates: April 19, 2012 (Sarasota); March 1, 2013 (United States)
- Running time: 91 minutes
- Country: United States
- Language: English

The Unspeakable Act is a 2012 American coming-of-age drama film written and directed by Dan Sallitt. It stars Tallie Medel as Jackie Kimball and Sky Hirschkron as Matthew Kimball, with Aundrea Fares, Kati Schwartz, and Caroline Luft in supporting roles. Framed by her voice-over narrative, the plot focuses on Jackie's unrequited romantic love for her brother Matthew.

Sallitt funded the micro-budget film using his income as a technical writer for the New York City Office of Technology and Innovation, and shot it in Ditmas Park, Brooklyn using sixteen days of accrued vacation time. The film premiered at the 2012 Sarasota Film Festival, where it won the Independent Visions Award. It received a one-week theatrical run at Anthology Film Archives in New York City on March 1, 2013, and was released on DVD and digital media by Cinema Guild on August 20, 2013. It was also screened at the 2012 Edinburgh International Film Festival, where it was nominated for the Best International Feature Film award, and in the 2013 International Film Festival Rotterdam. The film is dedicated to the late French auteur Éric Rohmer.

== Plot ==
17-year-old Brooklyn high schooler Jackie Kimball lives with her widowed mother, her 18-year-old brother Matthew, and her older sister Jeanne, while her oldest brother is abroad on a student exchange program. Jackie and Matthew have always been extremely close, but their relationship is complicated by her lifelong romantic feelings for him and his lack of reciprocity. Having until now been content with the existing state of affairs, Jackie has no choice but to deal with the disruption of her idyllic childhood world by the harbingers of adulthood.

In the spring of 2011, Matthew gets his first girlfriend, Yolanda. When Yolanda visits the Kimballs, Jackie is surprisingly sociable during the dinner, but unbeknownst to the diners, she is unable to eat without vomiting. Later that evening, Jackie confronts Matthew in the attic room that is their traditional meeting place, but he protests that he "want[s] to give [Yolanda] a chance."

Jackie is notified by a friend through a text message that Matthew unexpectedly broke up with Yolanda. Relieved, Jackie is finally able to enjoy food. Matthew had bought tickets to a concert he was planning to go to with Yolanda but, having broken up with her, invites Jackie instead. She is watchful of any sign that he might become receptive to her overtures, and they discuss her incestuous desire relaxedly, apparently not for the first time. Brother and sister spend a pleasant summer together, capped by an idyllic evening out at the concert.

Jackie's temporary reprieve from her grief wanes along with the summer itself as Matthew's departure for college approaches. Despite keeping up contact via video letters and a host of electronic media, she takes the separation hard, and her concerned mother sends her to psychotherapy. Initially secretive, on one of the visits Jackie finally opens up to her therapist Linda about her attraction to Matthew. Also, with a handsome classmate named Tristan, Jackie has her first sexual experience, of which she does not delay to notify Matthew, and he congratulates her on it.

Having no emotional attachment to Tristan, Jackie does not hesitate to alienate him when Matthew returns on vacation. During a late-night one-on-one chat in the attic room, Matthew, initially unswayed by Jackie's overtly sexual questions, snaps and accuses her of going too far. As he is again leaving for college, she is resigned to the fact that he will never reciprocate her feelings. Under Linda's influence, Jackie eventually makes the tough choice of applying to a different college than Matthew. She decides to major in psychology, an interest ignited by her own life experience.

== Cast ==
- Tallie Medel as Jackie Kimball
- Sky Hirschkron as Matthew Kimball
- Aundrea Fares as Mrs. Kimball
- Kati Schwartz as Jeanne Kimball
- Caroline Luft as Linda
- Eleanore Pienta as Megan
- Collin Summers as Tristan
- Caitlin Mehner as Yolanda
- Mike Faist as Tony
- Liz Toonkel as Sarah
- Jessica Pinfield as Zoe
- Sunita Mani as Jessica
- Kate Lyn Sheil as Madeleine
- Gonzalo Cordova as Annoying Classmate
- Zelda Knapp as Alexandra

== Reception ==
On the review aggregator website Rotten Tomatoes, 89% of 9 critics' reviews are positive. Metacritic, which uses a weighted average, assigned the film a score of 76 out of 100, based on 5 critics, indicating "generally favorable" reviews.

Neil Young reviewing the film for The Hollywood Reporter writes "Sensitive subject-matter is handled with tact and intelligence in this tart if talky US indie." According to Dennis Schwartz, "An American indie with European sensibilities, it makes for a different sort of coming of age film – a highbrow and distinctive one that's worth checking out."

Nicolas Rapold of The New York Times wrote, "More often than not the emotional bind is not shocking or taboo at its root, and indeed Mr. Sallitt’s latest, the Brooklyn-set feature The Unspeakable Act, is about the familiar more than it is about the forbidden." Similarly, Drew Hunt of the Chicago Reader warns, "This may bore or frustrate some viewers: the appeal of an incest story is the prospect of seeing repressed, taboo desires erupt into explicit sex and ensuing scandal. In The Unspeakable Act, the heart of the drama is not the transgression but the curious lack thereof."

Film critic Jonathan Rosenbaum included the film on his list of the ten best films of 2013. He later included the film in an afterword to his book Essential Cinema: On the Necessity of Film Canons.

Dan Sallitt, the director and screenwriter of the film himself, said in an interview with Filmmaker, "I personally don’t see Jackie’s incestuous desire as a transitory thing or part of her passage to adulthood. I think it’s just the way she is, and she will have to keep a lid on that desire in order to live comfortably, will have to cultivate other aspects of herself. By film’s end, I’m hoping that the viewer feels that we are all like Jackie, each with some quirk that makes us feel that we are the only abnormal person pretending to fit into an otherwise normal world."
