= Marsha Warfield =

American actress and comedienne (born 1954)

- Born: Marsha Francine Warfield; March 5, 1954 (age 72); Chicago, Illinois, U.S.
- Occupations: Actress, comedian
- Years active: 1977–present
- Website: marshawarfield.com

Marsha Francine Warfield (born March 5, 1954) is an American actress and comedian. She grew up on Chicago's South Side, graduating from Calumet High School. She is best known for playing tough, no-nonsense bailiff Roz Russell on the NBC sitcom Night Court from 1986 to 1992, reprising the role on a guest basis for its 2023 revival. Warfield also starred in the sitcom Empty Nest as Dr. Maxine Douglas (1993–1995). Before Night Court, she was a writer and performer on the short-lived Richard Pryor Show.

Warfield appeared in feature films such as D.C. Cab (1983) and Mask (1985), hosted The Marsha Warfield Show for ten months (March 1990–January 1991) and has made guest appearances on many television shows, including Riptide, Family Ties, Clueless, Cheers, Living Single, In Living Color, Cybill, Moesha, Smart Guy, and Touched by an Angel. Her early stand-up comedy career is profiled alongside those of Rhonda Hansome, Alice Arthur, and Jane Galvin Lewis in the 1984 documentary I Be Done Been Was Is by director Debra J. Robinson. As of 2024 she has a recurring role on 9-1-1 as the mother of main character paramedic and firefighter Henrietta "Hen" Wilson, played by Aisha Hinds.

She has also done stand-up comedy including appearances on the Norm Crosby hosted The Comedy Shop television series. She won the San Francisco International Comedy Competition in 1979, over such competition as Dana Carvey and A. Whitney Brown.

== Personal life ==
In 2017, Warfield publicly came out stating:

When I told my mother I was gay, she said she knew, and had known all my life.

Then, she asked me not to come out publicly while she was alive. I agreed, even though the request and her admission were hurtful in ways I couldn't put my finger on then, and probably haven't completely worked through it now, but, everybody who knew me, knew I was gay. The people I didn't tell knew anyway, and tacitly agreed to pretend that the unacknowledged had been acknowledged and accepted. Like I'm sure is true for millions of other glass door closeted people. When I went to bars, which was frequently, I never tried to hide who I was, so, it was an open secret. Had I never come out publicly, many, many people would have known. It would not then have ever really been a betrayal of trust to "spill the beans" because it wasn't a secret, it was an uncomfortably kept promise to my mother, but, it was also not the only reason I didn't come out swinging when she passed. The fear of the judgment of strangers and their holier-than-thou "shoulds" was at least as big of a burden to bear, but the "shoulds" that "should" matter, don't. Nobody should have to hide their sexuality. No parent should ask their child to.

There should be no shame in being gay.

Warfield's Night Court character, Roz, was portrayed as gay and marrying another woman in the 2023 revival, something Warfield says could not have happened at the time of the original show.

Warfield is married to Angie Maldonado.

== Filmography ==
=== Film ===
Year	Title	Role	Notes
1978	That Thing on ABC	Performer	Television film
1981	The Marva Collins Story	Lela Boland	Television film
1982	They Call Me Bruce?	Inmate # 2	
1983	D.C. Cab	Ophelia	
1984	I Be Done Been Was Is	Herself	
1985	Mask	Homeroom Teacher	
1985	Anything for Love	Cleo	Television film
1986	The Whoopee Boys	Officer White	
1988	Caddyshack II	Royette Tyler	
1989	Who Shrunk Saturday Morning	Ms. Bagwind	Television film
1997	Doomsday Rock		Television film
2023	A Holiday I Do	Andrea	

=== Television ===
Year	Title	Role	Notes
1977	The Richard Pryor Show	Various	3 episodes
1979	Legends of the Superheroes	Woman in Phone Booth	Episode: "The Challenge"
1984	Riptide	Max	4 episodes
1984	Family Ties	Doris Bradshaw	Episode: "Keaton and Son"
1985	Cheers	Roxanne Brewster	Episode: "The Belles of St. Clete's"
1986–1992	Night Court	Rosalind "Roz" Russell	135 episodes
1990-1991	The Marsha Warfield Show	Herself	225 episodes
1993	Hangin' with Mr. Cooper	Beverly, Mark's Sister	Episode: "Boys Don't Leave"
1993–1995	Empty Nest	Dr. Maxine Douglas	50 episodes
1993	The Addams Family	Mail Carrier	Episode: "Jack and Jill and the Beanstalk/Festerman Returns/Hand Delivered"
1993	In Living Color	Herself	Sketch: "Ace and the Main Man"
1993	Saved by the Bell: The College Years	Herself	Episode: "A Thanksgiving Story"
1994	The John Larroquette Show	Dexter's Sister	Episode: "Date Night"
1996	Touched by an Angel	Bebe Manero	Episode: "The Quality of Mercy"
1996	Cybill	Herself	Episode: "An Officer and a Thespian"
1996	ABC Afterschool Special	Nurse	Episode: "Me and My Hormones"
1997	Dave's World	Mrs. Alexander	Episode: "Does the Whale Have to Be White?"
1997	Smart Guy	Mrs. Dowling	2 episodes
1997	Mad About You	Birth Instructor	Episode: "Dry Run"
1997	Goode Behavior		Episode: "Goode Cop, Bad Cop"
1997	Living Single	Agnes Finch	2 episodes
1997	Moesha	Tracy Jackson	Episode: "My Mom's Not an Ottoman
1998	Clueless	Sgt. Meany	Episode: "The Joint"
1999	Love Boat: The Next Wave	Judge Nancy Watson	Episode: "Divorce, Downbeat and Distemper"
1999	Veronica's Closet	Shirley	Episode: "Veronica's Sliding Doors"
2021–present	9-1-1	Antonia 'Toni' Wilson	9 episodes
2023–2025	Night Court	Rosalind "Roz" Russell	5 episodes
2023–2026	The Upshaws	Glodine Upshaw	3 episodes
