= Modern Love Is Automatic (film) =

- Directed by: Zach Clark
- Written by: Zach Clark
- Produced by: Zach Clark; Sydney-Chanele R. Dawkins
- Starring: Melodie Sisk; Maggie Ross; Carlos Bustamante
- Cinematography: Daryl Pittman
- Edited by: Zach Clark
- Music by: Adam Blais
- Production companies: S&Z Productions
- Release date: 15 March 2009 (South by Southwest)
- Running time: 93 minutes
- Country: United States
- Language: English

Modern Love Is Automatic is a 2009 American comedy film directed by Zach Clark, starring Melodie Sisk, Maggie Ross and Carlos Bustamante.

== Cast ==
- Melodie Sisk as Lorraine Schultz
- Maggie Ross as Adrian Davis
- Carlos Bustamante as Mitch
- Diana Cherkas as Emily
- Rebecca Herron as Dolores
- Morgaine Lowe as Yvonne
- Matthew Hartman as Ben
- Marissa Molnar as Antoinette
- Hannah Bennett as Alaina
- David Berkenbilt as Mr. Schultz
- Monte Brown as Sex Shop Clerk

== Release ==
The film premiered at South by Southwest on 15 March 2009.

== Reception ==
Neil Genzlinger of The New York Times wrote that "If nothing else", the film "leaves you curious to see what this filmmaker will do next." Michael Atkinson of The Village Voice wrote that the film "eventually becomes a portrait of an unlikely friendship", while "never losing its broad satiric sneer". Leslie Felperin of Variety wrote that "Clark’s skill at shifting tone impresses, and what at first seems like a good indie-movie laugh at the expensive of provincial hicks develops into something both more empathic and more troubling."

Nick Schager of Slant Magazine wrote that while the film "eventually becomes too one-note for its own good", Clarke's "minimalist compositions and sharp comedic beats are formally assured, amplifying his material’s deadpan humor as well as reflecting his heroine’s state of mind and heart", while Sisk "expresses an astounding array of conflicted emotions, affording a brief, striking glimpse at the wounded yearning and fear cosseted behind her iron-curtain defenses." Scott Knopf of Film Threat wrote that one of the film's "flaws" is that "Adrian’s story is much more interesting than the main character’s."
