= The Ladies of the House =

2014 film

- Directed by: John Stuart Wildman
- Written by: Justina Walford; John Stuart Wildman
- Starring: Farah White; Melodie Sisk; Brina Palencia; Belladonna; Gabriel Horn
- Cinematography: Beau Ethridge
- Edited by: James Taylor
- Music by: Yasuhiko Fukuoka
- Production companies: Soaring Flight Productions; Femmewerks Productions; Wildworks Productions
- Distributed by: Gravitas Ventures
- Release date: April 4, 2014 (Dallas International Film Festival)
- Running time: 93 minutes
- Country: United States
- Language: English

The Ladies of the House, also known under the working title of Stripped, is a 2014 exploitation film and the directorial debut of actor John Stuart Wildman. The film had its world premiere on April 4, 2014 at the Dallas International Film Festival, and marks the first non-pornographic film by the former adult actress Belladonna.

Funding for The Ladies of the House was partially raised through a successful Kickstarter campaign.

== Synopsis ==
Jacob (Gabriel Horn), his brother Kai (RJ Hanson), and their friend Derrick (Samrat Chakrabarti) have decided that the best way to celebrate Kai's birthday is to go to a strip club. Kai ends up taking a liking to one of the strippers, Ginger (Belladonna), and they decide to follow her home. Upon discovering them, Ginger decides to invite them inside for some drinks. Kai and Ginger are sent into a closet to play seven minutes in heaven, which ends with Derrick accidentally killing her after she shoots Kai in the shoulder to prevent him from raping her. Before the boys can leave, Ginger's roommates return home, and after seeing Ginger, they decide that they will hunt and kill the three men. They soon find that Ginger's roommates are cannibals that are intent on turning the three of them into several meals.

== Cast ==
- Farah White as Lin
- Melodie Sisk as Getty
- Brina Palencia as Crystal
- Michelle Sinclair as Ginger
- Gabriel Horn as Jacob
- Samrat Chakrabarti as Derek
- Rj Hanson as Kai
- Frank Mosley as Piglet

== Reception ==
The Ladies of the House received a positive reception from the horror review websites Dread Central and Bloody Disgusting. Bloody Disgusting wrote that while the film was not perfect, that "Wildman and Walford have their heads and hearts in the right place and can only get better from here. A solid first effort even if it wasn’t my cup of tea to start with." Twitch Film wrote a positive review for the movie, which they felt "succeeds in making grindhouse both intelligent and sexy".
