= Luke Moran =

American filmmaker and actor

- Born: Manhattan, New York, United States
- Occupations: Actor; Director; Writer; Producer

Luke Moran is an American filmmaker and actor. He is best known for his work on the feature film Boys of Abu Ghraib (2014).

== Career ==
Moran began his career producing Listen to Your Heart, a 2010 independent film starring Cybill Shepherd and Moran's brother Kent Moran. In 2010, he began his own production company Rebel One Pictures with the purpose of producing his own feature films. Boys of Abu Ghraib was the first, released in select theaters on March 28, 2014, and was also Moran's directorial debut.

== Filmography ==
Film
Year	Film	Role	Notes
2010	Catch	Christian DaSica	Short
2010	Without Jill	Jack	Short
2010	Listen to Your Heart	Mitch	Producer
2014	Boys of Abu Ghraib	Jack Farmer	Director, writer and producer
