= Lumberjack Man =

- Promotional release poster
- Directed by: Josh Bear
- Written by: Josh Bear
- Produced by: Laura King
- Starring: Brina Palencia; Brandon Ford; Ciara Flynn; Alex Dobrenko; Chase Joliet; Jarrett King; Michael Madsen
- Cinematography: Joseph Winchester
- Edited by: Josh Bear
- Music by: Matt Chaney
- Distributed by: After Dark Films
- Release date: October 16, 2015
- Running time: 105 minutes
- Country: United States
- Language: English

Lumberjack Man is a 2015 American comedy slasher film, written and directed by Josh Bear. It was part of the 2015 After Dark Films "8 Films to Die For" line-up.

== Plot ==
Arriving at their annual camp retreat, the teens and staff of Good Friends Church Camp are unaware of the horror that awaits them. Near the campgrounds in an old abandoned log home, an undead Lumber Jack has arisen. Armed with his axes, saw, and a rolling griddle with giant flapjacks, he begins to stalk and kill the teens using their blood for syrup to eat with his meal. While this goes on, Dr. Peter Shirtcliff tries to warn the head park ranger, LuAnn Potts, of the terror awaiting the campers. She does not believe him as the story sounds too ridiculous to be true, especially when he says it relates to the award-winning Instant Pancakes from J.T. Jeppson. Shirtcliff leaves to save the campers while LuAnn, looking through old newspaper articles and police reports, begins to believe there is something going on, but is later attacked by the Lumberjack Man, who nearly kills her by throwing an axe at her back, but retreats when she throws a cup of syrup at him that her deputy was using earlier.

Back at the camp, the campers and staff are killed off one by one in the mess hall till only Faith, Reggie, the cook, and counselor Doug are left standing. Doug abandons the two to save himself, but dies from being cut in half. Shirtcliff arrives to help and reveals the truth of the Lumberjack Man and Jeppson. Back in 1892, when Jeppson was in the woods hunting wild cats, he was lured by a strong aroma that led him to the Lumberjack Man. Originally, he was Nehemiah Easterday, a quiet and secluded man who, every first Tuesday before Lent, would cook his family’s secret pancake recipe as tradition dictated. When he refused to share the recipe for profit, because he had vowed to take it to the grave, Jeppson killed him by drowning him in his own syrup and stole the recipe in a stuffed ocelot, invoking the wrath of Easterday, turning him into a vengeful monster. Shirtcliff states he rises and kills everyone who enters his woods, and once he finishes his pancakes before Lent morning, he becomes more powerful till he’s become unstoppable. After finding him and his home, the trio tries to fight Easterday, but he has already finished his breakfast and is now stronger. Faith, after finding the missing barrel of syrup from the mess hall in his cabin, covers herself with it, revealing also that she’s the descendant of Jeppson, taunting Easterday to attack. She fights him until he’s finally vanquished, ending his murder spree. With Shirtcliff, Reggie, and an injured LuAnn, they hitch a ride to town, leaving the camp and the Lumberjack Man’s memory behind.

== Cast ==
- Brina Palencia as LuAnn Potts, the head ranger of Big Timber State Park
- Brandon Ford as Nehemiah Easterday / Lumberjack Man
- Ciara Flynn as Faith
- Alex Dobrenko as Jeff
- Chase Joliet as Kellenberger
- Jarrett King as Reggie
- Michael Madsen as Dr. Peter Shirtcliff, a witness to the mass murders many years ago.
- Andy San Dimas as Theresa, the Assistant Camp Director.
- Christopher Sabat as Shep, a deputy ranger
- Jasmin Carina as Jacqueline
- Zachary Guerrero as Ernie
- Alyona Real as Stacey
- Athena Paxton as Courtney
- Raven Rockette as Kendra
- Moon Ray as Danielle
- David Nguyen as Raymond
- Tyler Mount as Trevor
- Troy Yingst as Logan
- Adam Sessler as Doug, the Camp Director

== Release ==
Prior to the release of the film, a viral marketing campaign was launched, which was reported by ShockTillYouDrop.com, now known as ComingSoon.net, and Internet personality and filmmaker James Rolfe. The marketing featured the sending of packages in the form of file boxes from the Shirtcliff Wellness Center, marked as classified by Dr. Peter Shirtcliff, a character in the film played by Michael Madsen. The packages contained a box of pancake batter, a torn shirt cloth, a trophy for a 1919 flapjack festival, a newspaper clipping about a mass murder incident taking place in 1919, and promotional photos.

The film premiered in Los Angeles, California on August 11, 2015 and in theaters on October 16, 2015.

== Reception ==
Negative Reviews:

Dread Central's Ari Drew gave the film three stars, considering the film fun but lacking in writing and technical capabilities. Slasher.Club writer McConnaughay condemned Lumberjack Man as a "nonsensical, ultimately bad film with occasional charm dispelled by terrible characters."

IMDb Reviews: The film holds 4.3/10 from approximately 1.5k viewers.

Rotten Tomatoes: The film holds a low 36% audience score (Popcornmeter) based on 100+ viewers with critics mostly absent (0% Tomatometer).
