= Alexia Rasmussen =

American actress (born 1985)

- Born: Alexia Rasmussen; July 10, 1985 (age 41); Los Angeles, California, US
- Occupation: Actress
- Known for: Listen to Your Heart Our Idiot Brother
- Height: 5 ft 6 in (168 cm)

Alexia Rasmussen is an American actress, known for Listen to Your Heart (2010), Our Idiot Brother (2011) and Tanner Hall (2009).

== Biography ==
Rasmussen was born on July 10, 1985, in Los Angeles, California. Alexia Rasmussen trained at the Experimental Theater Wing, the Classical Studio and the International Theater Wing in Amsterdam, all part of her time at New York University's Tisch School of the Arts.

== Filmography ==
=== Film ===
Year	Title	Role	Notes
2008	The Steam-Room Crooner	Tammy	Short
2009	Tanner Hall	Gretchen	
2009	The Queen of Greenwich Village	Young tess	Short
2010	Mary Last Seen	Mary	Short
2010	Listen to Your Heart	Ariana	
2010	Charley	Courtney	Short
2010	The Choctaw Funeral Cry	Annie	Short Film
2011	Our Idiot Brother	Chloe	
2011	Pandemic 41.410806, −75.654259	Bree	Short film
2011	Losers Take All	Vicky	
2011	Rearview	Cady	Short
2012	The Comedy	Young Woman	
2012	California Solo	Beau	
2012	Blue Bloods	Sophia Babikov	TV Series
2012	Coney	Alice	Short
2013	Kilimanjaro	Clare	
2014	Last Weekend	Vanessa Sanford	
2015	Bloomin Mud Shuffle	Monica	
2019	The Ghost Who Walks	Lena	
2019	A Sweet Life	Kat Dawson	
2020	I Blame Society	Stalin	
2020	Son of Monarchs	Sarah	
2022	They Want Me Gone	Monica	
