= Duraid Munajim =

Iranian film director and cinematographer

- Born: 1972 (age 53–54); Kuwait
- Occupations: Film director, cinematographer

Duraid Munajim is a Toronto-based film director and a freelance cinematographer.

== Career ==
Munajim is an Iraqi-Persian born in Kuwait in 1972, to an Iraqi Arab father and Iranian Persian mother. Duraid was 17 years of age when his family immigrated to Canada. He began studying anthropology at Vanier College, Montreal but had later received his BFA in film production in 1997 from Concordia University, in Montreal in which he made his thesis film, Tempus Fugit.

His work has been screened in festivals around the world, including IDFA in Amsterdam, Dokfest in Munich, as well as festivals in Switzerland, Lebanon, France, and across the U.S. and Canada.

A short documentary titled What I've Lost was screened at the Toronto International Film Festival, Montreal Nouveau film fest, Gulf Film Festival, and others. Another of his works, exile & empire: 20 shorts on Iraq, is an experimental 'essay-driven' documentary on Iraq, past and up to the U.S. invasion of 2003, told through a series of short films.

In 2007, Duraid worked as one of the principal camera operators on The Hurt Locker, which ended up winning multiple awards internationally, including Best Picture at the 82nd Academy Awards. In 2011, he served as director of photography on Buzkashi Boys, which was nominated for Best Live Action Short at the 85th Academy Awards. In 2012, Duraid worked again with Kathryn Bigelow on Zero Dark Thirty as a principal camera operator.

== Selected filmography ==
- Entre-temps à Beyrouth – 2002
- Fire Watch – 2003
- 19. – 2003
- Solo – 2003
- Acrobats and Maniacs – 2004 (TV)
- All the Ships at Sea – 2004
- Rings – 2004
- Next: A Primer on Urban Painting – 2005
- Lower East Side Stories – 2005
- Les jeux d'enfants – 2008
- What I've Lost – 2008
- The Hurt Locker – 2009 (camera operator)
- Son of Babylon – 2010
- Zero Dark Thirty – 2012
- The Switch (La Switch) – 2022
- Hanging Gardens – 2022
- Black Zombie – 2026
