= Dan Sallitt =

American filmmaker and film critic

- Born: July 27, 1955 (age 71); Wilkes-Barre, Pennsylvania, United States
- Education: Harvard College (BA); University of California, Los Angeles (MFA)
- Occupations: Filmmaker and film critic
- Website: panix.com/~sallitt

Dan Sallitt (born July 27, 1955) is an American filmmaker and film critic. He is known for his microbudget filmmaking and cinephile film criticism.

== Early life and career ==
Sallitt was born on July 27, 1955, in Wilkes-Barre, Pennsylvania. He received a Bachelor of Arts in Mathematics from Harvard College in 1976 and a Master of Fine Arts in Screenwriting from the University of California, Los Angeles in 1979.

Sallitt resides in New York City, where he works as a technical writer for the New York City Office of Technology and Innovation.

=== Film criticism ===
Sallitt moved to Los Angeles in 1976, where he served as first-string film critic for The Los Angeles Reader from 1983 to 1985. He has written film criticism for outlets such as Slate, The Chicago Reader, MUBI, Masters of Cinema, and The Village Voice. He maintains a film blog called Thanks for the Use of the Hall.

When Sight & Sound published its list of the greatest films of all time in 2012, Sallitt was asked to submit a list of his top-ten films. His selections consisted of Angel, Daisy Kenyon, Diary of a Country Priest, The General, The Mother and the Whore, Morocco, Notorious, Rio Bravo, Ruggles of Red Gap, and The Searchers.

=== Filmmaking ===
In 1986, Sallitt wrote and directed his first feature film, Polly Perverse Strikes Again, which he financed solely from his work as a film critic. He moved to New York City in 1992. There, he wrote and directed Honeymoon (1998), followed by All the Ships at Sea (2004).

He released The Unspeakable Act in 2012. It played at several major international film festivals, including the Rotterdam, Viennale, Karlovy Vary, Edinburgh, Melbourne, and BAMCinemaFest. The film won the Independent Visions Competition prize at the Sarasota Film Festival, and was acquired for U.S. distribution by The Cinema Guild. The film appeared on year-end top ten lists by Amy Taubin, Jonathan Rosenbaum, Adrian Martin, and Ignatiy Vishnevetsky and was included in the afterword to the Korean edition of Rosenbaum's Essential Cinema: On the Necessity of Film Canons.

His fifth feature film, Fourteen, premiered in 2019 at the 69th Berlin International Film Festival, and was picked up for U.S. distribution by Grasshopper Film.

=== Retrospectives and recognition ===
In 2013, Anthology Film Archives hosted a retrospective of his work in conjunction with the theatrical release of The Unspeakable Act. In Film Comment, Jonathan Robbins noted that Sallitt's work was "rooted in the films of Robert Bresson, Eric Rohmer, Jean Eustache, John Cassavetes, and Maurice Pialat". Later that same year, additional Sallitt retrospectives were held at the Cineuropa Film Festival in Santiago de Compostela, Spain and the CGAI Cinematheque in A Coruña, Spain.

In 2014, the George Eastman House in Rochester, New York held a retrospective called "Three Weekends with Dan Sallitt." In 2019, Filmadrid hosted a retrospective of Sallitt's work.

== Filmography ==
Year	Film	Notes
1986	Polly Perverse Strikes Again!	Directorial debut
1998	Honeymoon	
2004	All the Ships at Sea	
2012	The Unspeakable Act	
2019	Fourteen	
2019	Caterina	Short
2026	What Can't Be Mentioned	
