= Listen to Your Heart (2010 film) =

- Theatrical release poster
- Directed by: Matt Thompson
- Written by: Kent Moran
- Story by: Kent Moran
- Produced by: Kent Moran; Luke Moran
- Starring: Alexia Rasmussen; Kent Moran; Cybill Shepherd; Ernie Sabella; Frank Watson
- Cinematography: Chase Bowman
- Edited by: Harvey Rosenstock
- Music by: Kent Moran
- Release date: August 14, 2010 (New York City IFF)
- Running time: 102 minutes
- Country: United States
- Languages: English; American Sign Language

Listen to Your Heart is a 2010 romantic drama film written by Kent Moran, produced by Kent Moran and Luke Moran, and directed by Matt Thompson.

== Plot ==
Struggling and aspiring songwriter, Danny Foster, (Kent Moran) works at a diner. At the diner, Danny meets Ariana "Sam" Scott, a privileged young woman and gives her his number, despite Victoria (Cybill Shepherd), her mother's disapproval. Unbeknownst to Danny, the young woman is deaf. After a few weeks, she reveals to Danny her condition, to which he accepts. Danny takes her on a date to the movies. After, they head to the diner where he expresses his love for music. Danny begins to court Sam.

During a lecture, Sam gets ridiculed for answering a question. She runs off and take refuge in the restroom. Nicole, a students from the same class, consults her and they become friends. After an intimate moment, Danny and Sam bond over their deceased relatives (Danny mother and father, and Sam's father, respectively). Victoria finds out that Danny and Sam are dating. Next, she plots to break up their relationship. At a family party, Danny is kicked out for attempting to speak to her. Victoria introduces Sam to Nigel, a rich young man whom she approves of. When he attempts to sexually assaults Sam, her mother berates her. Sam runs away to find Danny, but she gets caught. Instead of leaving, Sam slaps her mother, which Roger witnesses.

Roger tells Danny that Sam loves him, although she is being manipulated. Unfortunately, Sam finds out that Victoria had blocked Danny from communicating with her. Sam speaks for the first time while scolding her mother and the caretaker quits. Thus, Victoria controlled Sam because she did not want to lose her like her father. Danny performs at the diner and Nicole is in attendance because Sam could not make it. Eventually, Danny starts to get sick due to cancer. Sam is by his side along the way. During a hospital visit, Danny and Sam have sex.

Sam undergoes ear surgery, so she can finally hear. At Danny's funeral, Roger congratulates Sam on her acceptance to a music school. When Sam arrives, she's surprised to hear everything in New York City.

== Cast ==
- Alexia Rasmussen as Ariana "Sam"
- Kent Moran as Danny Foster
- Cybill Shepherd as Victoria Scott
- Frank Watson as Roger
- Ernie Sabella as Tony
- Lisa Benner as Marianne
- Amy Lockwood as Nicole
- Robert Ousley as George
- Luke Moran as Mitch
- Shirley Knight as Grandma Sam

== Official festival selections ==
- Rhode Island International Film Festival
- Action On Film International Film Festival (Pasadena, California)
- New York City International Film Festival
- Beverly Hills Film, TV, and New Media Festival
- Offshoot Film Festival (Arkansas)
- North Country Film Festival (New Hampshire)
- Temecula Valley International Film Festival (California)
- Salem Film Festival (Salem, Massachusetts)
- Fort Lauderdale International Film Festival (Fort Lauderdale, Florida)
- Los Angeles Cinema Festival of Hollywood (California)
- Daytona Beach Film Festival (Florida)
- Amelia Island Film Festival (Florida)
- Fallbrook Film Festival (Bonsall, California)
- Lake Arrowhead Film Festival (Blue Jay, California)

== Awards ==
- Winner - Best Drama at the Salem Film Festival
- Winner - Best Narrative Feature (Merit Award) at the Los Angeles Cinema Festival of Hollywood
- Winner - Best Overall Film at the Offshoot Film Festival
- Winner - Best Picture at the Action on Film International Film Festival
- Winner - Audience Award at the Amelia Island Film Festival
- Winner - Audience Award at the Daytona Beach Film Festival
- Winner - Audience Award at the Fallbrook Film Festival
- Winner - Audience Award at the Fort Lauderdale International Film Festival
- Winner - Audience Award at the North Country Film Festival
- Winner - Audience Award for Best Feature at the Rhode Island International Film Festival
- Winner - Audience Award at the Temecula Valley International Film Festival
- Winner - People's Choice at the New York City International Film Festival
- Winner - Best Director at the Beverly Hills Film, TV, and New Media Festival
- Winner - Screenwriting (Alan J. Bailey Award) at the Action on Film International Film Festival
- Winner - Best Actress (Alexia Rasmussen) at the Los Angeles Cinema Festival of Hollywood
- Winner - Best Supporting Actress (Cybill Shepherd) at the Los Angeles Cinema Festival of Hollywood
- Winner - Music and the Magic of Movies Award at the Lake Arrowhead Film Festival
- Winner - Best Art Direction at the Action on Film International Film Festival
- Nominated - Best Actor (Kent Moran) – New York City International Film Festival
- Nominated - Best Actress (Alexia Rasmussen) – Action on Film International Film Festival
- Nominated - Best Supporting Actress (Cybill Shepherd) – Action on Film International Film Festival
- Nominated - Best Produced Screenplay – Action on Film International Film Festival
- Nominated - Best New Writer (Kent Moran) – Withoutabox Written Word Award

== News references ==
- http://bonsallchamber.org/event-620078
- http://villagenews.com/local/free-screening-of-film-listen-to-your-heart/
- http://www.film-festival.org/award10.php
- http://www.salemfilmfestival.com/2010/films/features/listentoyourheart.html
- https://www.whittierdailynews.com/article/ZZ/20110412/NEWS/110417428
- http://www.mountain-news.com/mountain_living/article_f5c8b460-6639-11e0-afba-001cc4c03286.html
