= Temecula Valley International Film Festival =

The Temecula Valley International Film Festival is a film festival held in Temecula Valley, California.

== Background ==
Launched in September 1995 and held, uninterrupted every September until 2011 (later to relaunch in 2014), the festival proclaims itself a celebration film and music. It drew 600 attendees to its 1995 launch. By 2008, it drew more than 20,000 people. Over 1,000 films have been screened at the Temecula Valley International Film Festival, representing film-work from more than 20 countries since 1995.

=== Cancellation and re-launch ===
The festival was canceled after its 2011 showing after nonprofit event producer Cinema Entertainment Alliance decided that revenue losses following the recession made the event untenable. There was an announcement that the event would be restructured, but it was not held in 2012 or 2013. It returned in 2014, re-branded as "Temecula Valley Int'l Film & Music Festival."

Amid the COVID-19 pandemic in California, the festival was hosted virtually in 2020.

== Categories ==
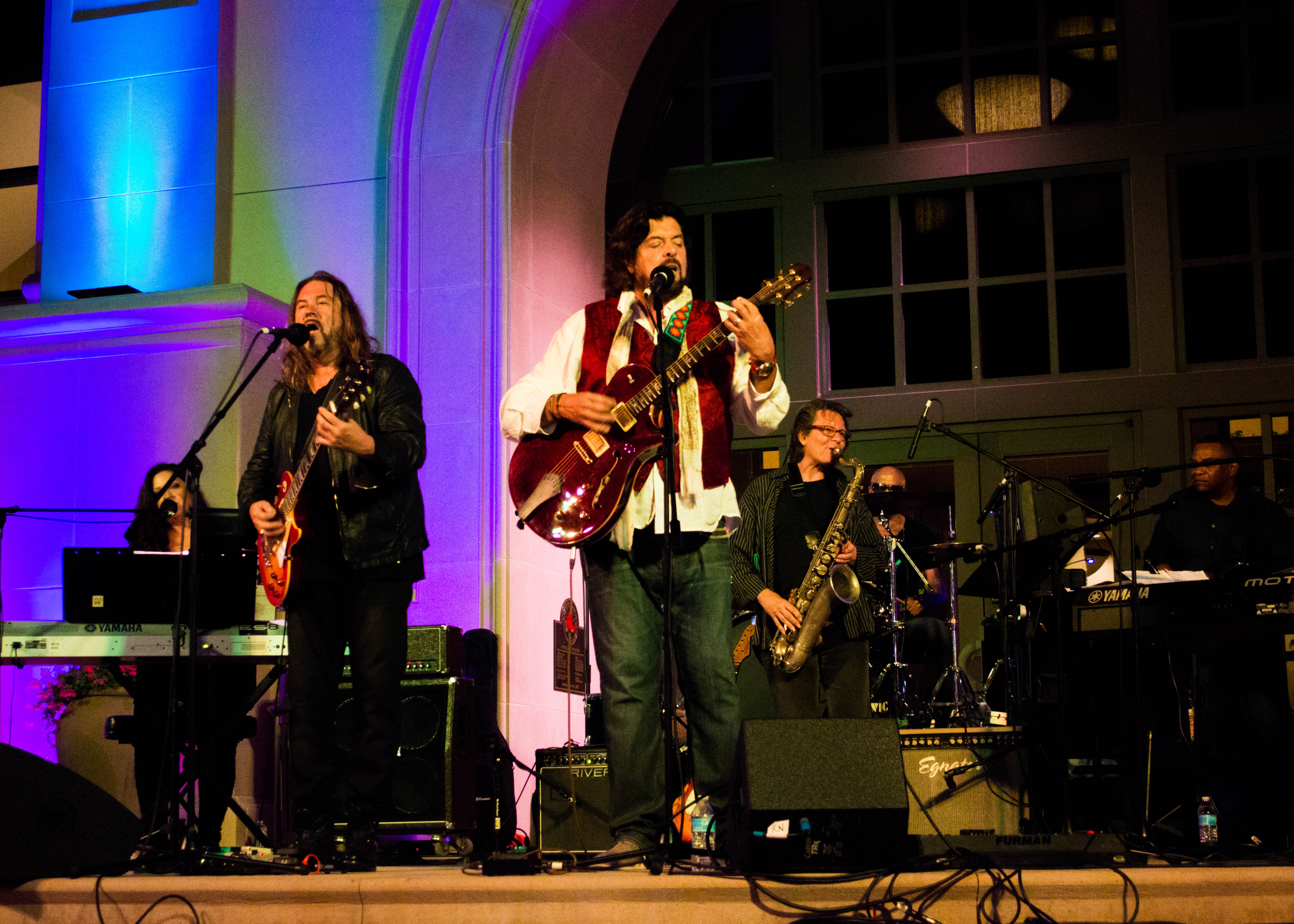
Alan Parsons playing live with Hang Dynasty during the 2014 festival.

=== Film ===
The festival is open to U.S. and foreign films in five categories: full-length features, shorts, documentaries, animation, and student films. Entries must have been completed by a specified year and must be submitted on DVD by a corresponding deadline, usually in the preceding June.

=== Music ===
Music entries are accepted for jazz and pop, hip hop, R&B, Latin, country, and folk. Lip syncing is not allowed.

== Program and events ==
After opening night festivities, receptions for artists are held, followed by workshops and an awards events. Concluding events include hot air balloon rides and a closing night wrap party with a best of fest screening presentations as well as a companion music festival.

In 2014, Executive Director of Music, Jon Michel Greenwood, expanded the music festival to two evenings. The final evening was headlined by supergroup Hang Dynasty, led by former Pink Floyd, Toto, and Supertramp saxophonist and guitarist Scott Page. Lifetime Achievement Award honoree, producer, audio engineer, and musician Alan Parsons, (The Beatles, Pink Floyd, The Alan Parsons Project) joined Hang Dynasty to play hits such as "Eye in the Sky" and "Don't Answer Me".

The event has been presented each year by Cinema Entertainment Alliance, a nonprofit arts and education organization dedicated to celebrating world cinema and music.

== Honorees and guests ==
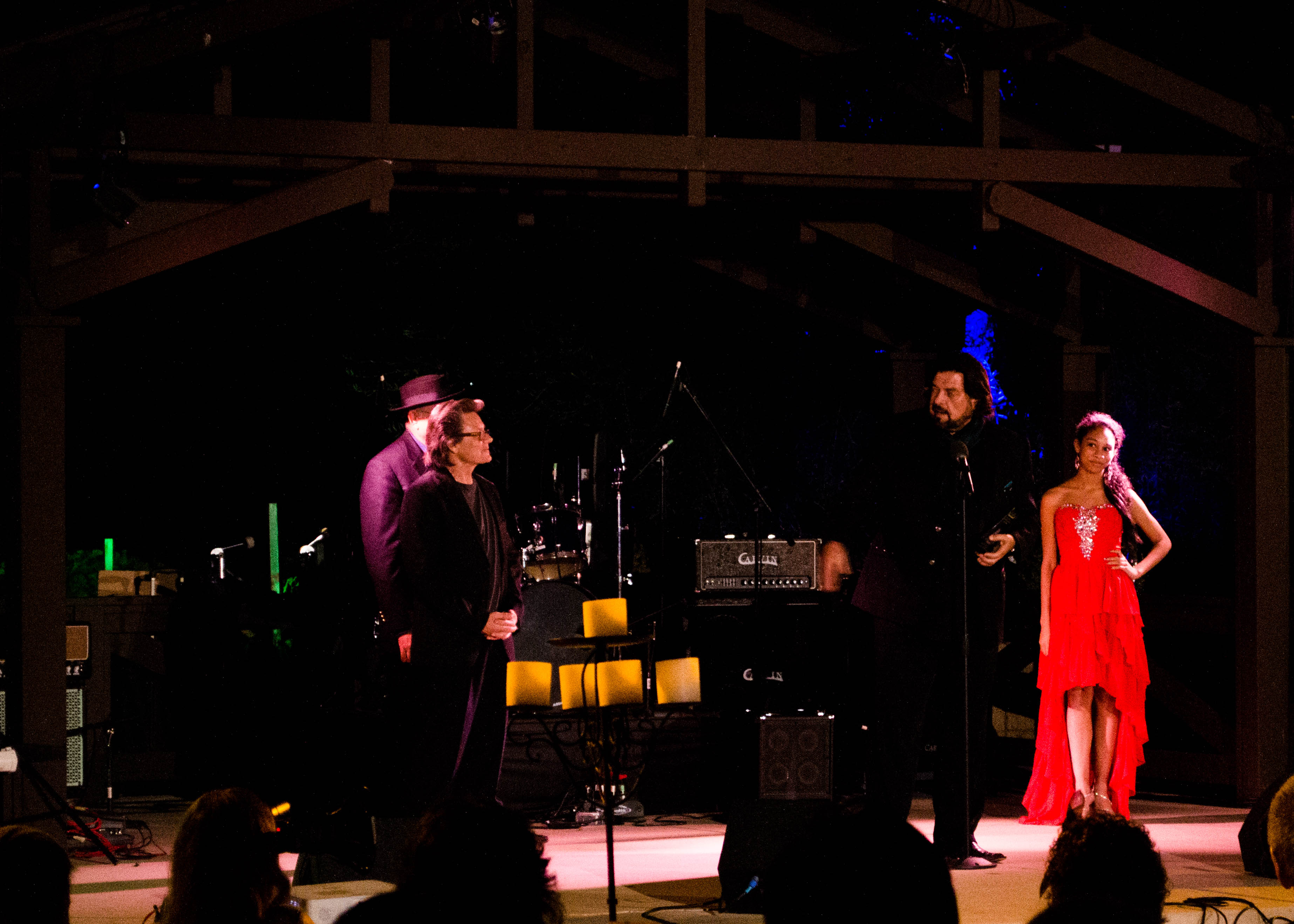
Scott Page of Pink Floyd, Toto, and Supertramp presents honoree Alan Parsons with a Lifetime Achievement Award at the 2014 Gala Dinner.

Honorees have included: Dionne Warwick, Hector Elizondo, Dennis Haybert, John Ottman, John Badham, Lucas Foster, Rick Shroeder, Steve Dorff, Natasha Henstridge, AFI's Jean Firstenberg, Howard W. Koch, Robert Wise, Carl Reiner, Karl Malden, Shirley Jones, Michael York, Ray Charles, Rita Coolidge, Marsha Mason, Robert Stack, Gale Ann Hurd, William Shatner, Patty Duke, Billy Preston, Sam Grogg, Julie Corman, Etta James, John Spencer, Diane Ladd, Penelope Spheeris, Howard Suber, AC Lyles, Louis Gossett, Jr, Lou Rawls, Jonathan Lynn, Dr. Elizabeth Daley, Gina Gershon, Trevor Rabin, Michael Childers, and Alan Parsons.
