= St. Louis Filmmakers Showcase =

The St. Louis Filmmakers Showcase (SLFS) is an annual presentation of the nonprofit Cinema St. Louis. Held in St Louis, Missouri, the event serves as the area's primary venue for films made by local artists.

== Description ==
SLFS was held at the Tivoli Theatre in the Delmar Loop district before moving to the Hi-Pointe Theatre. The event annually screens works that were written, directed, edited, or produced by St. Louis natives or those with strong local ties featuring 15-20 programs over five days, ranging from full-length fiction features and documentaries to multi-film compilations of fiction and documentary shorts. Highlights include post-screening talks with filmmakers, lively seminars on the moviemaking process, and a closing-night party at Blueberry Hill that features announcements of SLFS films chosen for inclusion in the St. Louis International Film Festival and awards given by the St. Louis Gateway Film Critics Association.
