= Little Sister (2016 film) =

2016 film by Zach Clark

- Theatrical poster
- Directed by: Zach Clark
- Written by: Zach Clark
- Story by: Zach Clark; Melodie Sisk
- Produced by: Zach Clark; Daryl Pittman; Melodie Sisk
- Starring: Addison Timlin; Ally Sheedy; Keith Poulson; Peter Hedges; Barbara Crampton
- Cinematography: Daryl Pittman
- Edited by: Zach Clark
- Music by: Fritz Myers
- Distributed by: Forager Films
- Release dates: March 12, 2016 (SXSW); October 14, 2016 (US)
- Running time: 91 minutes
- Country: United States
- Language: English

Little Sister is a 2016 American dark comedy film written and directed by Zach Clark. The film stars Addison Timlin as a young nun visiting her childhood home after her brother's return from Iraq.

== Synopsis ==
In October 2008, young nun-in-training Colleen avoids all contact with her family, until an email from her mother announces that her brother has returned from the war in Iraq. Temporarily abandoning her studies, Colleen arrives at her childhood home in Asheville, North Carolina, where she finds her old room exactly how she left it – painted black and covered in goth and heavy metal posters. Although her parents are happy to see her, unease and awkwardness abound, and her brother is living as a recluse in the guesthouse.

== Cast ==
- Addison Timlin as Colleen Lunsford
- Ally Sheedy as Joani Lunsford
- Keith Poulson as Jacob Lunsford
- Peter Hedges as Bill Lunsford
- Barbara Crampton as The Reverend Mother
- Kristin Slaysman as Tricia
- Molly Plunk as Emily

== Production ==
When asked in an interview if he added any autobiographical details to the film's story, director Zach Clark said, "My producer and creative life partner Melodie Sisk was generous enough to let me steal liberally from her life...We put our respective familial histories in a blender and that became the emotional backbone of Little Sister. I have a sister named Colleen, a brother named Jacob, a dad named Bill, and a mom named Joani. Melodie’s stepdad’s last name is Lunsford. We shot most of the movie in her parents’ house. No character is a verbatim representation of their namesakes, but every emotional beat in the movie has a real-life resonance for myself or Melodie."

The prosthetic effects for the character of Jacob Lunsford were designed by Brian Spears and applied by Peter Gerner.

On the subject of period detail, Clark said, "Our costume designer, David Withrow, was a real stickler for what was and wasn’t in fashion in 2008, and I think his work is the most meticulous in terms of selling the period. Beyond that, it was a lot of double-checking to make sure certain props or products would’ve existed in the period. I took it pretty seriously. The news reports they watch on TV are almost verbatim recreations of the look and feel of Asheville, NC local news from the era. Website design was also pretty important for the period vibe. In exterior shots, we tried to keep out-of-period cars to a minimum, but that’s probably where we were the most lax with the period setting."

== Release ==
Little Sister premiered at South by Southwest on March 12, 2016. The movie's distribution rights were acquired by Joe Swanberg's Forager Films, a first for the company.

The movie was given a limited theatrical release in New York on October 14, 2016, with a simultaneous release on Amazon Video and iTunes in the US and worldwide on Vimeo. Its theatrical release was later expanded to Chicago, Los Angeles, Washington, D.C. and additional cities.

The film was released on DVD and Blu-ray on February 7, 2017.

== Critical reception ==
Little Sister received positive reviews from film critics. On review aggregator website Rotten Tomatoes, the film has a 94% approval rating based on 35 reviews, with an average rating of 7.1/10. The site's critical consensus reads, "Little Sister subverts indie drama expectations with a refreshingly off-kilter look at family dynamics that makes its points through solid characterizations and earnest effort." On Metacritic, which assigns a weighted average rating, the film has a score of 74 out of 100 based on 13 critics, indicating "generally favorable" reviews.

Katie Rife of The A.V. Club gave the film a B, saying it was, "a slight, sweetly cynical indie dramedy about family and belonging and the ways we cope with life's disappointments." Sheri Linden of The Hollywood Reporter called the film, "Winningly wry and understated," and argued, "Flirting with sitcommy high jinks, Clark instead gives us a bittersweet cocktail of soul-weary defeat and unassuming vigor." Peter Travers of Rolling Stone gave the film three out of four stars, stating, "In Little Sister, a skillful blend of humor and heartbreak (minus sappy sentiment), Clark takes us to places and head spaces we don’t see coming." Travers further added, "Clark takes the story he concocted with producer Melodie Sisk down dark alleys, but Little Sister is never cynical or inhumane...He's made a transfixing film about a family that looks touchingly and unnervingly like yours and mine."

New Yorker film critic Richard Brody named it the best movie of 2016.

Oleg Ivanov of Slant Magazine gave the film one and a half out of four stars, writing, "The film's attempt at political insight and portrayal of social malaise are meant to give it the illusion of depth, but they barely conceal what at its core is an exploitation melodrama."
