= Sarasota Film Festival =

Annual film festival held in Sarasota, USA

Coordinates: 27.339503°N 82.544523°W

- Location: Sarasota, Florida, United States
- Founded: 1998
- Website: https://www.sarasotafilmfestival.com/

The Sarasota Film Festival is a film festival located in Sarasota, Florida and held in April. Its mission is "to celebrate the art of filmmaking and the contribution of filmmakers by hosting an international film festival and developing year-long programs for the economic, educational, and cultural benefit of our community".

== History ==
Following the demise of the Sarasota French Film Festival in 1996, John Welch began researching and planning an independent film festival. He hired Jody Kielbasa as Executive Director and the first "mini-festival", featuring eight independent films, six actors and a gala fundraiser was held in January 1999. The county controversially funded the festival double what it requested, for a total of $50,000. The investment was defended as good for tourism. In 2002, the St. Petersburg Times highlighted the festival's potential for marketing and distribution, and, in 2003, Variety called the festival "one of the edgier, more interesting entrants on the scene." In 2006, the start date was changed from January to April. In 2008, the Sarasota Herald-Tribune wrote that the festival had evolved to be more about funding than premieres. Amid financial problems, Welch and others resigned from the executive committee in 2009, citing a different vision than that of the current festival.

The festival has since grown, showing 252 films and bringing more than 100 filmmakers and actors to the Sarasota area over its ten-day run of April 4–13, 2014. The Sarasota Herald-Tribune said in 2014 that the festival was now a "showcase for serious independent films and the cinephiles who love them." It has integrated smaller programs, including UN Women's "Through Women's Eyes" Film Festival and the student-focused "YouthFEST" The 2015 Sarasota Film Festival Education Program features a documentary summer camp for students.
