= Kimbra discography =

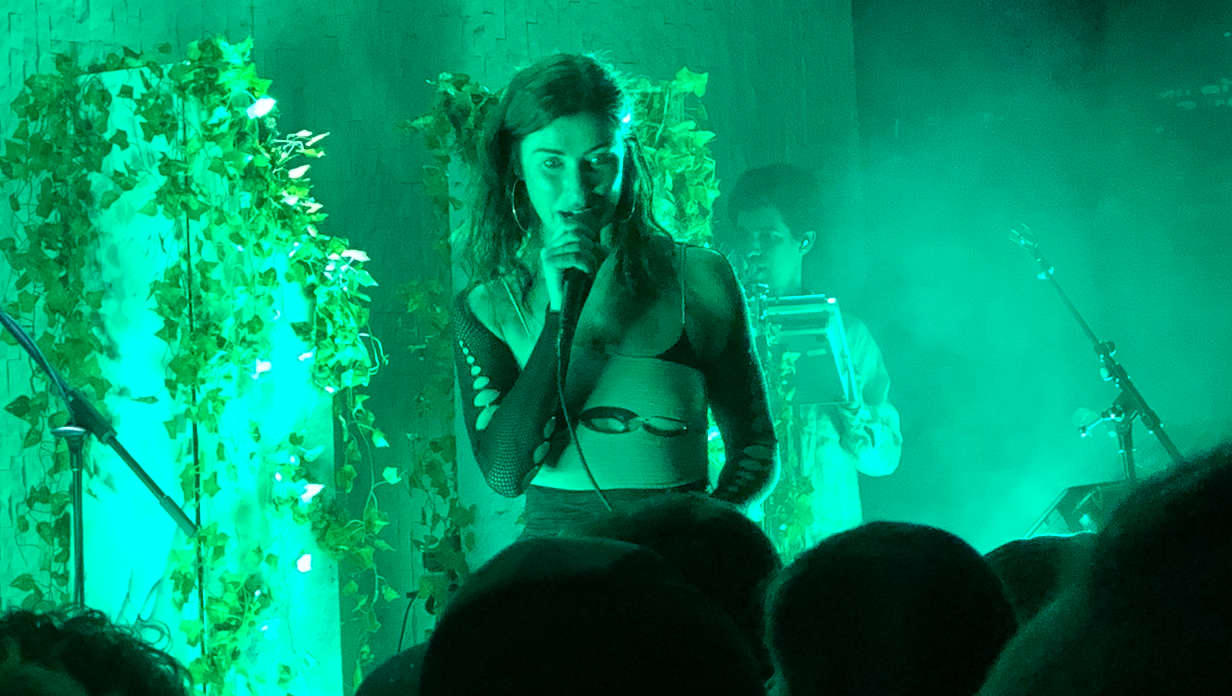
- Kimbra in 2023
- Studio albums: 5
- Singles: 20
- Music videos: 8

The discography of Kimbra, a New Zealand indie pop singer, consists of five studio albums and twenty solo singles, as well as fifteen music videos. Her biggest international hit to date is her collaboration with Gotye, "Somebody That I Used to Know", which reached #1 in several countries, including the United States, the United Kingdom and Australia, as well as in Kimbra's native New Zealand.

== Albums ==
=== Studio albums ===
Title	Album details	Peak chart positions										Certifications
Title	Album details	NZ	AUS	BEL (FL)	BEL (WA)	CAN	GER	NLD	POL	UK	US	Certifications
Vows	Released: 29 August 2011; Label: Warner Bros.; Format: CD, LP, digital download	3	4	135	185	24	83	95	23	108	14	ARIA: Platinum; RMNZ: Platinum
The Golden Echo	Released: 19 August 2014; Label: Warner Bros.; Format: CD, LP, digital download	5	5	—	—	—	—	—	—	—	43	
Primal Heart	Released: 20 April 2018; Label: Warner Bros.; Format: CD, LP, digital download	12	31	—	—	—	—	—	—	—	179	
A Reckoning	Released: 27 January 2023; Label: Self-released; Format: CD, LP, digital download	— (Note: A Reckoning did not enter the NZ Top 40 Albums Chart, but peaked at number 19 on the Top 20 NZ Albums Chart.)	—	—	—	—	—	—	—	—	—	
Idols & Vices (Vol. 1)	Released: 25 September 2024; Label: Self-released; Format: Digital download	—	—	—	—	—	—	—	—	—	—	
"—" denotes releases that did not chart or were not released in that territory.

=== Remix albums ===
Title	Album details
Vows Remixes	Released: October 2, 2012; Label: Warner Bros.; Format: Digital download

== Extended plays ==
Title	Album details
Songs from Primal Heart: Reimagined	Released: October 26, 2018; Label: Warner Bros.; Format: Digital download

== Singles ==
=== As lead artist ===
Title	Year	Peak chart positions					Certifications	Album
Title	Year	NZ	AUS	BEL (FL) Tip	JPN	POL	Certifications	Album
"Deep for You"	2005	—	—	—	—	—		Non-album singles
"Simply on My Lips"	2007	—	—	—	—	—		Non-album singles
"Settle Down"	2010	37	— (Note: "Settle Down" did not enter the Australian ARIA Singles Chart but peaked at number seven on the ARIA Hitseekers Chart.)	—	—	29	RMNZ: Gold	Vows
"Cameo Lover"	2011	— (Note: "Sweet Relief" did not enter the NZ Top 40 Singles Chart, but peaked at number 15 on the NZ Artists Singles Chart.)	— (Note: "Cameo Lover" did not enter the Australian ARIA Singles Chart but peaked at number six on the ARIA Hitseekers Chart.)	—	—	—		Vows
"Good Intent"	2011	—	98	35	—	—		Vows
"Warrior" (featuring Mark Foster and A-Trak)	2012	22	— (Note: "Warrior" did not enter the Australian ARIA Singles Chart but peaked at number 16 on the ARIA Hitseekers Chart.)	57	—	—	RMNZ: Gold	Vows
"Two Way Street"	2012	— (Note: "Two Way Street" did not enter the NZ Top 40 Singles Chart, but peaked at number 6 on the NZ Artists Singles Chart.)	—	—	—	45		Vows
"Come into My Head"	2012	—	—	—	—	—		Vows
"90s Music"	2014	— (Note: "90s Music" did not enter the NZ Top 40 Singles Chart, but peaked at number 6 on the NZ Artists Singles Chart.)	— (Note: "90's Music" did not enter the Australian ARIA Singles Chart but peaked at number 12 on the ARIA Hitseekers Chart.)	—	—	—		The Golden Echo
"Miracle"	2014	—	—	—	37	58		The Golden Echo
"Goldmine"	2015	—	—	—	—	—		The Golden Echo
"Sweet Relief"	2016	— (Note: "Sweet Relief" did not enter the NZ Top 40 Singles Chart, but peaked at number 20 on the NZ Artists Singles Chart.)	—	—	—	—		non-album single
"Everybody Knows"	2017	— (Note: "Everybody Knows" did not enter the NZ Top 40 Singles Chart, but peaked at number 10 on the NZ Heatseeker Singles Chart and number 15 on the NZ Artists Singles Chart.)	—	—	—	—		Primal Heart
"Top of the World" (solo or featuring Snoop Dogg)	2017	— (Note: "Top of the World" did not enter the NZ Top 40 Singles Chart, but peaked at number 1 on the NZ Artists Heatseeker Singles Chart.)	—	—	—	—		Primal Heart
"Human"	2018	— (Note: "Human" did not enter the NZ Top 40 Singles Chart, but peaked at number 1 on the NZ Artists Heatseeker Singles Chart.)	—	—	—	—		Primal Heart
"Version of Me" (solo or featuring Dawn Richard)	2018	—	—	—	—	—		Primal Heart
"Like They Do on the TV"	2018	—	—	—	—	—		Primal Heart
"Lightyears"	2019	—	—	—	—	—		Primal Heart
"Save Me"	2022	— (Note: "Save Me" did not enter the NZ Top 40 Singles Chart, but peaked at number 19 on the Hot NZ Singles Chart.)	—	—	—	—		A Reckoning
"Replay!"	2022	—	—	—	—	—		A Reckoning
"Foolish Thinking" (featuring Ryan Lott)	2023	— (Note: "Foolish Thinking" did not enter the NZ Top 40 Singles Chart, but peaked at number 11 on the Hot NZ Singles Chart.)	—	—	—	—		A Reckoning
"Possession"	2023	—	—	—	—	—		A Reckoning (Deluxe)
"The Robin"	2023	—	—	—	—	—		A Reckoning (Deluxe)
"Different Story"	2023	—	—	—	—	—		A Reckoning (Deluxe)
"Stuff I Don't Need" (featuring Banks)	2024	—	—	—	—	—		Idols & Vices (Vol. 1)
"Demi God" (featuring Sahtyre)	2024	—	—	—	—	—		Idols & Vices (Vol. 1)
"Touching" (with Tōth)	2025	—	—	—	—	—		
"—" denotes releases that did not chart or were not released in that territory.

=== As featured artist ===
Title	Year	Peak chart positions										Certifications	Album
Title	Year	NZ	AUS	AUT	BEL (FL)	CAN	GER	IRE	NLD	UK	US	Certifications	Album
"Asleep in the Sea" (As Tall As Lions featuring Kimbra)	2009	—	—	—	—	—	—	—	—	—	—		You Can't Take It with You
"I Look to You" (Miami Horror featuring Kimbra)	2010	—	— (Note: "I Look to You" did not enter the Australian ARIA Singles Chart but peaked at number nine on the ARIA Hitseekers Chart.)	—	—	—	—	—	—	—	—		Illumination
"Somebody That I Used to Know" (Gotye featuring Kimbra)	2011	1	1	1	1	1	1	1	1	1	1	RMNZ: 9× Platinum; ARIA: 26× Platinum; BEA: 4× Platinum; BPI: 5× Platinum; BVMI: 4× Platinum; IFPI AUT: 2× Platinum; RIAA: 17× Platinum	Making Mirrors
"Flies" (Of God featuring Kimbra)	2011	—	—	—	—	—	—	—	—	—	—		Grey March
"Made to Love" (John Legend featuring Kimbra)	2013	—	—	—	—	—	—	—	—	—	—		Love in the Future
"Team, Ball, Player, Thing" (#KiwisCureBatten featuring Lorde, Kimbra, Brooke Fraser, et al.)	2015	2	—	—	—	—	—	—	—	—	—		Non-album single
"Brother Sun" (Electric Wire Hustle featuring Kimbra)	2015	—	—	—	—	—	—	—	—	—	—		Aeons EP
"Where the Down Bit Starts" (Great Danes featuring Kimbra)	2016	—	—	—	—	—	—	—	—	—	—		Great Danes EP
"White Feathers" (SLOWOLF featuring Kimbra)	2016	—	—	—	—	—	—	—	—	—	—		White Feathers EP
"Bitten by the Apple" (Big Black Delta featuring Kimbra)	2016	—	—	—	—	—	—	—	—	—	—		Trágame Tierra
"Montreal" (What So Not featuring Kimbra)	2016	—	—	—	—	—	—	—	—	—	—		Divide & Conquer
"Belong" (Fyfe featuring Kimbra)	2017	—	—	—	—	—	—	—	—	—	—		The Space Between
"Ice Cold" (Half Alive featuring Kimbra)	2019	—	—	—	—	—	—	—	—	—	—		Now, Not Yet
"In My Bones" (Jacob Collier featuring Kimbra and Tank and the Bangas)	2020	—	—	—	—	—	—	—	—	—	—		Djesse Vol. 3
"Design" (Cory Wong featuring Kimbra)	2020	—	—	—	—	—	—	—	—	—	—		The Striped Album
"Gone" (Son Lux featuring Kimbra)	2021	—	—	—	—	—	—	—	—	—	—		Non-album single
"Tired, Nervous & Broke!" (JPEGMafia featuring Kimbra)	2021	—	—	—	—	—	—	—	—	—	—		LP!
"Bad Habit" (Scary Pockets featuring Kimbra)	2023	—	—	—	—	—	—	—	—	—	—		Non-album single
"Wasting Time" (Llucid featuring Kimbra)	2023	—	—	—	—	—	—	—	—	—	—		Deep Blue Dreams
"Keen" (featuring Dram)	2024	—	—	—	—	—	—	—	—	—	—		Idols & Vices (Vol. 1)
"Somebody (2024)" (Gotye, Fisher and Chris Lake featuring Sante Sansone and Kimbra)	2024	— (Note: "Somebody (2024)" did not enter the NZ Top 40 Singles Chart, but peaked at number 15 on the NZ Hot 40 Singles Chart.)	— (Note: "Somebody (2024)" did not enter the Australian ARIA Singles Chart but peaked at number nine on the ARIA Australian Artists Chart.)	—	—	—	—	—	— (Note: "Somebody (2024)" did not enter the Netherlands' Single Top 100 but peaked on the Netherlands' Single Tip Chart at number 15.)	—	—	RMNZ: Gold; ARIA: Platinum; BEA: Gold	Non-album single
"—" denotes releases that did not chart or were not released in that territory.

== Other charted songs ==
Title	Year	Peak chart positions	Album
Title	Year	NZ Hot	Album
"Nobody but You"	2014	9	The Golden Echo
"Love in High Places"	2014	13	The Golden Echo
"The Good War"	2018	3	Primal Heart
"—" denotes releases that did not chart or were not released in that territory.

== Songwriting credits ==
Year	Artist	Song	Written with	Album
2013	John Legend	"Made to Love"	List: John Stephens Justin Baron Andrew Horowitz Kanye West Marcos Palacios Dave Tozer Nana Kwabena Ernest Clark Lil' Louis Marshall Jefferson	Love in the Future
2014	Nick Lamar	"Why Won't You"	List: Nicholas Lamar Mark Landon	Lucid
2017	Ashleigh Ball	"Blue Moon"	List: Ashleigh Ball David Beckingham Ajay Bhattacharya Francois Tetaz	Gold in You EP
2019	Toth	"Down for the Count"	List: Alexander Toth	PMASPHWN
2021	CL	"Siren"	List: Lee Chae-rin Richard Witherspoon Jr. Retro Future Nicholas Lee	Alpha

== Music videos ==
List of music videos, showing year released and director
Title	Year	Director(s)
"Cameo Lover"	2011	Guy Franklin
"Good Intent"	2011	Guy Franklin
"Settle Down"	2011	Guy Franklin
"Come into My Head"	2012	Guy Franklin
"Warrior" (featuring Mark Foster and A-Trak)	2012	Daniels
"Two Way Street"	2012	Matthew Rolston
"90s Music"	2014	Justin Francis
"Miracle"	2014	Thom Kerr
"Goldmine"	2015	Chester Travis and Timothy Armstrong
"Sweet Relief"	2016	Phillip David Stearns
"Everybody Knows"	2017	Guy Franklin
"Top of the World"	2017	Guy Franklin
"Human"	2018	Gregor Nicholas
"Version of Me"	2018	Micaiah Carter
"Like They Do on the TV"	2018	Chester Travis
"Lightyears"	2019	Chester Travis
"save me"	2022	Yvan Fabing
"replay!"	2022	Colin Solal Cardo
"foolish thinking"	2023	Alex Cook
"Different Story"	2023	Patrick Rowe
