= 90s Music =

Single by Kimbra

from the album The Golden Echo
- Released: 19 May 2014
- Genre: Glitch
- Length: 3:36
- Label: Warner Bros.
- Songwriters: Kimbra Johnson; Mark Foster; Matt Morris; Stephen McQuinn; Timon Martin
- Producers: Kimbra Johnson; Major Dudes; Rich Costey

Kimbra singles chronology
"Come into My Head" (2012)	"90s Music" (2014)	"Miracle" (2014)

Music video
- "90s Music" on YouTube

"90s Music" is a song co-written, co-produced and performed by New Zealand recording artist Kimbra, issued as the lead single from her second studio album The Golden Echo.

== Composition ==
The song was co-written by Johnson (also co-produced), Mark Foster, Matt Morris, and Stephen McQuinn. Alongside its song's production by Major Dudes and Rich Costey. The song had added with diverse genres: Alternative R&B, electropop, glitch hop and art rock. In this song, Kimbra recalls the time spent with an old flame, and compares her remembrance of him to the sentiment of a 1990s song. Kimbra shouts out to all artists and bands such as Aaliyah, Michael Jackson, Mariah Carey, Nirvana and TLC.

== Critical reception ==
The song has received positive reviews from critics. Jason Lipshutz of Billboard called the song "captivating" when he previewed it in May 2014. Stan Mahoney of The Guardian explained that the song was "manic" and that it was a "self-consciously eclectic [...] single". Jake Cleland of Pitchfork, while giving the parent album a middling rating, called the song "polarizing" and further explained that it is the most coherent track on the album.

== Music video ==
The official music video for the song was directed by Justin Francis. It has multiple coloured graphics with visualisations and a duo of young backup dancers.
