= A Reckoning =

Studio album by Kimbra
- Released: 27 January 2023
- Length: 40:51
- Label: Self-released

Kimbra chronology
Primal Heart (2018)	A Reckoning (2023)	Idols & Vices (Vol. 1) (2024)

Singles from A Reckoning
- 1. "Save Me" Released: 30 October 2022; 2. "Replay!" Released: 17 November 2022; 3. "Foolish Thinking" Released: 24 January 2023; 4. "Possession" Released: 22 September 2023; 5. "The Robin" Released: 27 October 2023; 6. "Different Story" Released: 8 December 2023

A Reckoning is the fourth studio album by New Zealand singer-songwriter Kimbra, and the first under the label Inertia and [PIAS], having previously been signed with the label Warner Records. It was released on 27 January 2023. The album was promoted with the singles "Save Me", "Replay!" and "Foolish Thinking".

Kimbra released a deluxe version of A Reckoning on 8 December 2023 with three brand new songs, “Different Story”, “Possession” & “The Robin”.

== Background ==
Kimbra began working on her fourth album 'A Reckoning' in 2018, co-producing it with Ryan Lott of Son Lux. When asked about the delay between 2018's 'Primal Heart' and 'A Reckoning' in an interview with Billboard, Kimbra explained "I went through a stage of really struggling to write. Maybe it was because I was struggling to articulate what I was feeling."

== Critical reception ==
Professional ratings
Review scores
Source	Rating
AllMusic	4/5 stars
The Daily Telegraph	4/5 stars
The Sydney Morning Herald	3/5 stars
Sputnikmusic	7.4/10

A Reckoning was met with positive reception from music critics. AllMusic gave the album 4/5 stars, commenting "Kimbra's use of hip-hop and electronic music on A Reckoning fortifies her resilience". The Daily Telegraph also gave the album 4/5 stars, stating "Chunky piano chords pierce slithering, ghostly synths on the opening track, 'Save Me'. It is at once beautiful and malevolent, evolving into a further nine tracks exploring the nuances of cinematic and intimate reckonings". The Sydney Morning Herald gave a moderately positive rating of 3/5 stars for the album, stating "Kimbra has returned with A Reckoning - an album that smartly pares back the excesses of its predecessors and highlights the nuances of both her voice and her songwriting, without turning its back on formal and aesthetic weirdness", but later stated 'LA Type' and 'GLT', on which Kimbra raps, break the flow of the otherwise chic, streamlined album." Sputnikmusic believed that the experimentation was a positive aspect, and gave the album a 7.4/10, commenting "She took the liberty to branch out in whatever direction she felt needed and it actually gave the album an odd sense of cohesion."

== Track listing ==
All lyrics are written by Kimbra. Additional lyricists noted below.

A Reckoning
No.	Title	Lyrics	Music	Producer(s)	Length
1.	"Save Me"		Kimbra; Zach Tenorio Miller	Kimbra; Ryan Lott	4:29
2.	"Replay!"		Kimbra; Brux	Kimbra; Brux; Lott	3:57
3.	"Gun"		Kimbra; Lott; Matt Friedman	Kimbra; Lott	3:22
4.	"The Way We Were"		Kimbra; Lott; Andy Seltzer	Kimbra; Lott	3:45
5.	"New Habit"	Justin Tranter	Kimbra; Tranter; Chris Tabron; Felix Snow	Kimbra; Lott; Tabron^{[a]}; Snow^{[a]}	3:28
6.	"GLT" (featuring Erick the Architect)	Erick the Architect	Kimbra; Erick the Architect; Timon Martin	Kimbra; Lott; Martin	3:14
7.	"LA Type" (featuring Tommy Raps and Pink Siifu)	Pink Siifu; Tommy Raps	Kimbra; Nate Mercereau; Pink Siifu; Tommy Raps	Kimbra; Lott; Mercereau^{[a]}	4:12
8.	"Foolish Thinking" (featuring Ryan Lott)		Kimbra; Lott	Kimbra; Lott	5:54
9.	"Personal Space"		Kimbra; Paul Dixon	Kimbra; Lott; Dixon^{[a]}	3:45
10.	"I Don't Want to Fight"		Kimbra; Lott	Kimbra; Lott	4:52
Total length:					40:51

A Reckoning (Deluxe Version)
No.	Title	Music	Producer(s)	Length
11.	"Different Story"	Kimbra; Lott	Kimbra; Lott	2:03
12.	"Possession"	Kimbra; Lott; Patrick Wimberly	Kimbra; Lott	3:24
13.	"The Robin"	Kimbra; Jake Sherman; Hana Tajima	Kimbra; Sherman	5:21
Total length:				51:39

Notes

- ^{^[a]} signifies an additional producer

== Personnel ==
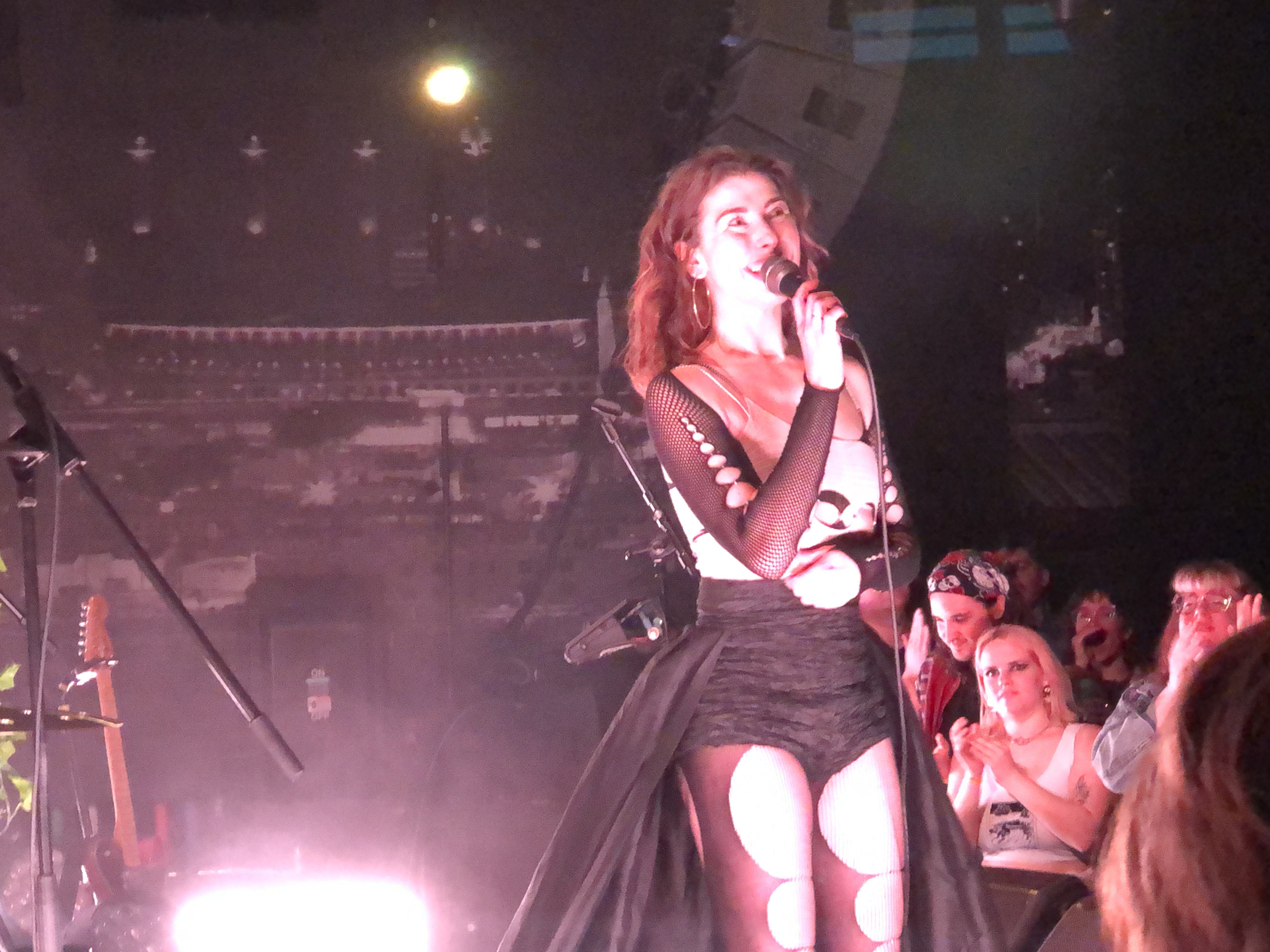
Kimbra performing on the tour for A Reckoning, in 2023

Musicians

- Kimbra – lead vocals
- Ryan Lott – string arrangements (tracks 1, 10); vocals, piano (8)
- Rob Moose – viola, violin, string arrangements (1, 8)
- Taylor Graves – synthesizer (6), keyboards (7)
- Jacob Bergson – additional programming (6)
- Spencer Zahn – electric bass (7)
- Questlove – drums (7)

Technical

- Twerk – mastering
- Jon Castelli – mixing
- Eli Crews – vocal engineering (1–3, 5, 7–9)
- Spencer Zahn – vocal engineering (6, 10)
- John Rooney – engineering (7)
