= List of New Zealand Grammy Award winners and nominees =

The following is a list of Grammy Awards winners and nominees from New Zealand:

Year	Nominee / work	Award	Result	Ref.
1984	'The Marriage of Figaro'	Best Opera Recording - Kiri Te Kanawa	Won	
1997	'When I Fall in Love' performed by Natalie Cole, Nat King Cole	Best Instrumental Arrangement Accompanying Vocalist - Alan Broadbent	Won	
2000	'Lonely Town'	Best Instrumental Arrangement Accompanying Vocalist - Alan Broadbent	Won	
2004	Sacred Tibetan Chant: The monks of Sherab Ling Monastery	Best Traditional World Music Album - Jon Mark and Thelma Burchell	Won	
2005	'Into The West'	Best Song written for Visual Media - Fran Walsh	Won	
2006	'You'll Think of Me'	Best Male Country Vocal Performance - Keith Urban	Won	
2008	'The Distant Future'	Best Comedy Album - Jemaine Clement and Bret McKenzie	Won	
2008	'Stupid Boy'	Best Male Country Vocal Performance - Keith Urban	Won	
2009	'Billy Budd'	Best Opera Recording - Jonathan Lemalu	Won	
2010	'Sweet Thing'	Best Male Country Vocal Performance - Keith Urban	Won	
2011	''Til Summer Comes Around'	Best Male Country Vocal Performance - Keith Urban	Won	
2013	'Somebody That I Used to Know'	Best Pop Duo/Group Performance - Kimbra	Won	
2013	'Somebody That I Used to Know'	Record of the Year - Kimbra	Won	
2014	"Royals"	Record of the Year - Lorde	Nominated	
2014	"Royals"	Song of the Year - Lorde	Won	
2014	"Royals"	Best Pop Solo Performance - Lorde	Won	
2014	Pure Heroine	Best Pop Vocal Album - Lorde	Nominated	
2018	Melodrama	Album of the Year - Lorde	Nominated	
2018	What a Beautiful Name	Grammy Award for Best Contemporary Christian Music Performance/Song - Brooke Fraser	Won	
2021	Jojo Rabbit	Grammy Award for Best Compilation Soundtrack for Visual Media - Taika Waititi	Won	
