= Goldmine (Kimbra song) =

2015 single by Kimbra

Single by Kimbra

from the album The Golden Echo
- Released: 15 July 2015
- Recorded: 2014
- Genre: R&B; pop
- Length: 4:40
- Label: Warner Bros.
- Songwriters: Kimbra Johnson; Fraser T Smith
- Producers: Kimbra Johnson; Rich Costey; John Hill; Al Shux

Kimbra singles chronology
| "Miracle" (2014) | "Goldmine" (2015) | "Sweet Relief" (2016) |

Music video
- "Goldmine" on YouTube

"Goldmine" is a song co-written, co-produced and performed by New Zealand recording artist Kimbra, issued as the third single from her second studio album The Golden Echo.

== Critical reception ==
"Goldmine" has received positive reviews from critics, with many complimenting the song's R&B-ish sound. Stan Mahoney of The Guardian complimented the song's "rising R&B chant" as a seemingly welcome "departure from [Kimbra's] art pop stereotype"; while Sasha Geffen of Consequence of Sound called Kimbra's vocals on the song "elastic" while also stating that the song has the strongest chorus on the album. Ryan Reed of Paste echoed this notion, highlighting the song as "the album's true centerpiece".

== Music video ==
The official music video for "Goldmine" was filmed in a factory in Berlin. It was shot in black-and-white using a high amount of stop-motion animation; and was directed by Chester Travis and Timothy Armstrong.

=== Critical reception ===
The music video has received critical acclaim. Rolling Stone called the video "stunning"; while Paley Martin of Billboard proclaimed it as "an artful and edgy [...] piece set to a soul-piercing soundtrack". Scott Heins of Okayplayer described the video as "hypnotic".
