= Nerve (band) =

American band

- Origin: New York, U.S.
- Members: Jojo Mayer : drums; John Davis : bass; Jacob Bergson : keyboards; Aaron Nevezie : programming
- Past members: Janek Gwizdala : bass; Takuya Nakamura : synthesizers
- Website: nerve.band

Nerve is an American, New York based band, founded by the drummer Jojo Mayer.

== History ==
From the 1990s, Jojo Mayer participated actively in party events called "Prohibited Beatz" which was a platform for experimental interaction with DJ's and many kind of artists. The band Nerve initially emerged from these parties, described as an "endeavor in reverse engineering the textures and rhythms of the current stream of computer generated music into a live performed, improvisational format". While the line-up of musicians in Nerve was initially fluid, it solidified in the early 2000s around Jojo Mayer, Takuya Nakamura, John Davis and Roli Mosimann, and then again in 2014 around Mayer, Davis, Jacob Bergson and Aaron Nevezie.

In 2016, Schweizer Radio und Fernsehen produced and televised a documentary film which chronicles several Nerve concerts in Zurich, London, Tokyo and Hong Kong, and which features interview footage with Mayer and others pertaining to the origins and history of Nerve.

With the current lineup of Mayer, Davis, Bergson and Nevezie, Nerve has maintained a constant touring schedule across the United States, Europe, Asia and Canada.

== Personnel ==
=== Current line-up ===
- Jojo Mayer : drums
- John Davis : bass
- Jacob Bergson : keyboards
- Aaron Nevezie : programming

=== Former members ===
- Janek Gwizdala : bass
- Takuya Nakamura : synthesizers
- Roli Mosimann : real-time audio deconstruction

== Discography ==
- 2007 - Prohibited Beats
- 2010 - EP1
- 2010 - EP2
- 2011 - EP3
- 2011 - The Distance Between Zero And One
- 2012 - EP4
- 2014 - EP5
- 2015 - Live in Europe
- 2015 - Ghosts of Tomorrow
- 2016 - Vocal Collaborations
- 2017 - Nerve
- 2018 - After the Flare
- 2019 - Music for Sharks
