= Miracle (Kimbra song) =

2014 single by Kimbra

Single by Kimbra

from the album The Golden Echo
- Released: 24 July 2014
- Genre: Disco; funk; pop
- Length: 4:49
- Label: Warner Bros.
- Songwriters: Kimbra Johnson; Daniel Johns; Stephen Bruner
- Producers: Kimbra Johnson; Rich Costey

Kimbra singles chronology
"90s Music" (2014)	"Miracle" (2014)	"Goldmine" (2015)

Music video
- "Miracle" on YouTube

"Miracle" is a song co-written, co-produced and performed by New Zealand recording artist Kimbra, issued as the second single from her second studio album The Golden Echo. It was her first solo song to chart on Billboard, peaking at #37 on the Japan Hot 100.

== Critical reception ==
The song has received mainly positive reviews from critics, with many complimenting the song's disco-influenced feel. Olivia Forman of Spin stated that the song has a "flawlessly fluctating [...] beat" and additionally complimented Kimbra's vocals. Josh Brooks of Vulture Magazine proclaimed the song as "a killer modern pop disco track" and added that in comparison to the rest of The Golden Echo, the track is where Kimbra is at her "grooviest". Jake Cleland of Pitchfork praised the song but also felt that it was "a-minute-and-a-half too long".

== Music video ==
The official music video for the song was directed by Thom Kerr. Throughout the video, Kimbra is shown dancing down the sidewalk in various costumes, all designed by Australian designer Jaime Lee Major.

== Chart positions ==
Chart (2014)	Peak position
Japan Hot 100 (Billboard)	37
