= Warrior (Kimbra song) =

Single by Kimbra featuring Mark Foster and A-Trak

from the album Vows (Australian Tour Edition/New Zealand Deluxe Edition)
- Released: 4 May 2012
- Recorded: 2011
- Genre: Indie pop; electropop; alternative dance
- Length: 4:13
- Label: Warner Bros.
- Songwriters: Mark Foster; Kimbra Johnson; Isom Innis; Alain Macklovitch

Kimbra singles chronology
| "Good Intent" (2011) | "Warrior" (2012) | "Two Way Street" (2012) |

Music video
- "Warrior" on YouTube

"Warrior" is a song by New Zealand singer Kimbra, featuring Mark Foster of the American indie pop band Foster the People and Canadian electro house DJ A-Trak. The song was written as a part of "Three Artists, One Song", an annual series by shoe company Converse. The song was initially released as a free download in the "Three Artists, One Song" website. The song was later included in international and special editions of Kimbra's debut studio album, Vows. "Warrior" was released as the fourth single from Vows on 4 May 2012. The song peaked #22 on the New Zealand RIANZ charts, and peaked #1 on the New Zealand NZ Artists RIANZ charts.

== Composition ==
The song is composed in the key of B♭ and has the BPM of 110. The song uses elements from electronic dance music while still having somewhat of a pop feel to the song. The song is recognized as an indie pop and dance song.

== Music video ==
The music video premiered on the YouTube channel for Converse shoes on 5 April 2012. The video features a group of prisoners being forced to wrestle, and being brutally beaten, with chairs and other objects, for the enjoyment of a man wearing a red sweater. Scenes of Kimbra singing with her arms tied while watching the fight are cut into the video. At the end, the wrestlers turn on the man wearing the red jumper, and Kimbra knocks him out. The video ends with Mark Foster, Kimbra and A-Trak leaving the stadium. All of the wrestlers are wearing Converse shoes.

== Track listing ==
| No. | Title | Length |
|---|---|---|
| 1. | "Warrior" | 4:13 |

== Chart performance ==
The song has peaked at number 22 on the official New Zealand singles chart.

| Chart (2012) | Peak position |
|---|---|
| New Zealand (RIANZ) | 22 |
| New Zealand NZ Artists (RIANZ) | 1 |

== Certifications ==
| Region | Certification | Certified units/sales |
|---|---|---|
| New Zealand (RMNZ) | Gold | 7,500^{*} |
^{*} Sales figures based on certification alone.
