= Come into My Head =

2012 single by Kimbra

Single by Kimbra

from the album Vows
- Released: 2012
- Recorded: 2011
- Genre: Funk rock; indie pop
- Length: 4:38
- Label: Warner Bros.
- Songwriters: Kimbra; Keith Ciancia; Sonny J Mason

Kimbra singles chronology
"Two Way Street" (2012)	"Come into My Head" (2012)	"90s Music" (2014)

Music video
- "Come into My Head" on YouTube

"Come into My Head" is a song performed and co-written by New Zealand recording artist Kimbra, issued as the sixth and final single from her debut studio album Vows. Although no physical single was released for the song, a music video was released, directed by Guy Franklin.

== Background and music video ==
Kimbra told American Songwriter that she was "particularly excited" by the song because "it was sort of my moment to get really indulgent musically, and throw in lots of key changes and interesting rhythmic moments." She added: "it's one of the more lyrically aggressive tracks on the record and has some really fun turnarounds and surprises." Deantoni Parks (then of The Mars Volta) plays drums on the song.

The music video for "Come into My Head" was released in September 2012. Directed by Guy Franklin, it features Kimbra as a psychiatric hospital patient being examined by a doctor. The video cuts between a tranquil interview session environment and frenzied dance sequences.

"Come into My Head" was also featured during the end credits and on the soundtrack for the 2013 film The Heat, and featured in the soundtrack for the EA Sports video game, FIFA 13.

== Critical reception ==
The song has received positive reviews from critics. Cole Waterman of PopMatters stated that the song has "funk swagger" and that Kimbra is "at her sauciest" in the song. Jens Ulvedahl Carlsen of Sound of Jens gave the song an A+ rating and also felt that the song is better than Kimbra's previous single, "Two Way Street". Erin Brady of Interview magazine wrote: "Blending elements of pop and '70s funk with expansive vocals, 'Come Into My Head' ricochets from relative calm to full-blown groove as effortlessly as it does from interior to exterior, imagination to actuality."
