= Primal Heart =

Studio album by Kimbra
- Released: 20 April 2018
- Recorded: 2015–2017
- Genre: Pop
- Length: 44:24
- Label: Warner Bros.
- Producers: Kimbra (also exec.); John Congleton (also exec.); Timon Martin; Taylor Graves; Andrew Maury; Matt Friedman; Skrillex; Tony Berg; Ethan Gruska

Kimbra chronology
The Golden Echo (2014)	Primal Heart (2018)	A Reckoning (2023)

Singles from Primal Heart
- 1. "Everybody Knows" Released: 29 September 2017; 2. "Top of the World" Released: 10 November 2017; 3. "Human" Released: 19 January 2018; 4. "Version of Me" Released: 23 February 2018; 5. "Like They Do on the TV" Released: 30 March 2018; 6. "Lightyears" Released: 31 January 2019

Primal Heart is the third studio album by New Zealand musician Kimbra. It was released on 20 April 2018 through Warner Bros. Records. It had originally been scheduled for release on 19 January 2018, but was pushed back. Kimbra released "Hi Def Distance Romance" as a free exclusive download to fans signed up to her mailing list. The album spawned 6 singles.

== Critical reception ==
Professional ratings
Aggregate scores
Source	Rating
Metacritic	75/100
Review scores
Source	Rating
AllMusic	4/5 stars
The Independent	4/5 stars
NME	4/5 stars
The Observer	3/5 stars
Pitchfork	5.9/10

Primal Heart was positively received by music critics. At Metacritic, which assigns a normalised rating out of 100 to reviews from mainstream critics, the album has an average score of 75 based on five reviews, indicating "generally favorable reviews".

== Track listing ==
Primal Heart
No.	Title	Writer(s)	Producer(s)	Length
1.	"The Good War"	Kimbra Johnson; Timon Martin	Kimbra; John Congleton; Martin^{[b]}	3:38
2.	"Top of the World"	Johnson; Sonny Moore; Lars Horntveth	Kimbra; Congleton; Skrillex^{[a]}	3:25
3.	"Everybody Knows"	Johnson; Taylor Graves	Kimbra; Congleton; Graves^{[b]}; Martin^{[b]}	3:44
4.	"Like They Do on the TV"	Johnson; Ian Kirkpatrick; Michael Tighe	Kimbra; Congleton; Andrew Maury^{[a]}	4:19
5.	"Recovery"	Johnson; Graves	Kimbra; Congleton; Graves^{[b]}	3:19
6.	"Human"	Johnson; Tighe; Paul Salva; Robin Hannibal	Kimbra; Congleton	3:58
7.	"Lightyears"	Johnson; Matt Friedman; Scott Mellis	Kimbra; Congleton; Maury^{[a]}; Friedman^{[b]}	3:31
8.	"Black Sky"	Johnson; David Saw; Matt Robinson; Natasha Bedingfield	Kimbra; Congleton	3:51
9.	"Past Love"	Johnson; Friedman	Kimbra; Congleton; Friedman^{[b]}	3:35
10.	"Right Direction"	Johnson; Benjamin Davies	Kimbra; Congleton	4:45
11.	"Version of Me"	Johnson; Ethan Gruska; Tony Berg	Kimbra; Congleton; Gruska^{[b]}; Berg^{[b]}	3:57
12.	"Real Life"	Johnson	Kimbra	2:22
Total length:				44:24

Songs from Primal Heart: Reimagined
No.	Title	Writer(s)	Producer(s)	Length
1.	"Black Sky"	Johnson; Saw; Robinson; Bedingfield	Horntveth	5:24
2.	"Everybody Knows"	Johnson; Graves	Horntveth	4:46
3.	"The Good War"	Johnson; Martin	Horntveth	4:19
4.	"Hi Def Distance Romance"	Johnson; Martin	Horntveth	3:32
Total length:				18:01

Notes

- ^{^[a]} signifies a co-producer
- ^{^[b]} signifies an additional producer

== Personnel ==
Musicians

- Kimbra – vocals (all tracks), drum programming (tracks 1–4, 7), keyboards (1, 8)
- John Congleton – bass (tracks 1, 4, 6, 7), drum programming (2, 4–7), additional programming (2), synthesizer (6)
- Timon Martin – guitar (tracks 1, 4, 5, 7), programming (1, 6), synthesizer (1), drum programming (3, 8), additional keyboards (6), additional programming (9)
- Bobby Sparks – synthesizer (track 1), Wurlitzer (2), keyboards (9, 10)
- Lars Horntveth – synthesizer (tracks 1, 3, 4, 7, 8), synth bass (2, 3, 5, 7), saxophone (4), tenor saxophone (6), guitar (8, 9), arrangement (8), string arrangement (9, 10), strings (9), sound effects (11)
- Pino Palladino – bass (track 2)
- Skrillex – drum programming (track 2)
- Taylor Graves – keyboards, programming (tracks 3, 5); synthesizer (5)
- Spencer Zahn – bass (tracks 3, 6), synth bass (8)
- Joey Waronker – drums (tracks 3, 9, 10), additional programming (5)
- Andrew Maury – additional programming, guitar (track 4); programming, synthesizer (7)
- Ian Kirkpatrick – synthesizer programming (track 4)
- Roger Joseph Manning Jr. – synthesizer (tracks 6, 9, 10), piano (9), Wurlitzer (10)
- Paul Salva – additional programming (track 6)
- Robin Hannibal – keyboards (track 6)
- Matthew Masurska – additional synthesizer, programming (track 7)
- Matt Friedman – programming, synthesizer (track 7)
- F.A.M.E.'s Project – strings (tracks 9–11)
- Macedonian Orchestra – strings (tracks 9–11)
- Zachary Dawes – bass (tracks 9, 10)
- Ethan Gruska – piano (track 11)
- Owen Pallett – string arrangement (track 11)

Technical

- Greg Calbi – mastering
- John Congleton – mixing

Visuals

- Kimbra – creative direction
- Margo Graxeda – creative direction
- Norman Wonderly – creative direction
- Vlad Sepetov – art direction, graphic design, packaging
- Micaiah Carter – photography

== Charts ==
Chart (2018)	Peak position
Australian Albums (ARIA)	31
New Zealand Albums (RMNZ)	12
US Billboard 200	179
