= Settle Down (Kimbra song) =

Single by Kimbra

from the album Vows
- Released: June 6, 2010; November 1, 2011 (re-release)
- Recorded: 2010
- Genre: Indie pop; art pop; freak folk
- Length: 4:02; 4:17 (Album version)
- Label: Forum 5; Warner Bros.
- Songwriters: François Tétaz; Kimbra Johnson
- Producers: François Tétaz; M-Phazes

Kimbra singles chronology
| "Asleep In The Sea" (2009) | "Settle Down" (2010) | "Cameo Lover" (2011) |

EP cover

"Settle Down" is a song written by Kimbra and François Tétaz and features the production of Tétaz and M-Phazes and was recorded from 2008 to 2010. The song served as Kimbra's debut single and the lead single for her debut album Vows (2011). It was released on June 6, 2010 and then re-released on November 1, 2011. It is the first and only song Kimbra has released stems/multitracks for. The single peaked at number 37 on the New Zealand Singles Chart.

== Background ==
This is one of Kimbra's earliest songs, being written at the age of sixteen. It was then revised during the production of Vows with François Tétaz. The song is about having to conform to certain roles and desires, in this case being marriage/love, at an early age.

== Composition ==
"Settle Down" (2010)
A 24-second sample of "Settle Down".

Composed in the key of A minor, "Settle Down" is a song that prominently features Kimbra's layered vocals. It features syncopated handclaps and clav in the A section and a lush string section is introduced in the B section.

== Music video ==
A music video for "Settle Down" was first released onto YouTube on 6 July 2010 at a total length of four minutes and eight seconds. The music video was chosen by United States iTunes as its "Music Video of the Week".

The music video begins with the title of the song in black and white with a man narrating in the background. Kimbra is then shown wearing a little black dress on a stage with red curtains and behind her are porcelain dolls on shelves in rows. It then changes to a scene of a young girl that is seated at a dinner table singing with a male mannequin. Both are dressed in a '50s era style. Intercut with scenes of Kimbra, the young girl is in front of a mirror, brushing her hair with the mannequin feigning sleep in the background. After Kimbra, another young girl in a white dress and pearl necklace is seen outside on a picnic with the same mannequin, however, the first young girl sees the two of them together. At home, the first young girl begins to clean a home, prepare a meal, and dresses up for the mannequin, who at the end of all the hard work she's done, is absent. Kimbra is shown again, but the two girls are now with her, both dressed in white nightgowns. They dance as backup dancers or hype girls for Kimbra as the dolls on the shelves are set on fire. The video ends with the message "The End."

== Track listing ==
- CD single
1. "Settle Down" – 4:01
- CD EP
1. "Settle Down" – 4:01
2. "Good Intent" – 3:32
3. "Plain Gold Ring" (live at Sing Sing) – 4:31
4. "Limbo" – 3:06
5. "Cameo Lover" (Sam Sparro & Golden Touch remix) – 5:01
- Streaming
1. "Settle Down" (Ben Lam remix) – 2:54
- Streaming
1. "Settle Down" (Kimbra remix) (featuring Electric Wire Hustle) – 2:58
- Streaming
1. "Settle Down" (Sick Cycle 160 BPM remix) – 5:06
- Digital download
1. "Settle Down" – 4:01
2. "Wandering Limbs" – 5:26
3. "Withdraw" – 4:06
- Digital download
1. "Settle Down" (Byram remix) – 4:17
- Digital download
1. "Settle Down" – 4:02
2. "Cameo Lover" – 4:04
3. "Good Intent" – 3:30
4. "Limbo" – 3:51
- Digital download
1. "Settle Down" – 4:02
2. "Limbo" – 3:05
3. "Plain Gold Ring" (live at Sing Sing) – 4:33
4. "Cameo Lover" (Sam Sparro & Golden Touch remix) – 5:01
- Digital download
1. "Settle Down" – 4:02
2. "Limbo" – 3:05
3. "Plain Gold Ring" (live at Sing Sing) – 4:33
4. "Cameo Lover" (Sam Sparro & Golden Touch remix) – 5:01
5. "Settle Down" (music video) – 4:09

== Credits and personnel ==
- Lead vocals – Kimbra
- Producers – François Tétaz, M-Phazes
- Lyrics – Kimbra Johnson, François Tétaz
- Label: Warner Bros. Records

== Chart performance ==
| Chart (2011) | Peak position |
|---|---|
| New Zealand (Recorded Music NZ) | 37 |

| Chart (2012) | Peak position |
|---|---|
| New Zealand (Recorded Music NZ); NZ Singles only | 15 |

The song debuted at number 37 on New Zealand, 5 March 2011 and managed to spend a week in the chart. The track received moderate radio playing among South African radio stations.

== Certifications ==
| Region | Certification | Certified units/sales |
|---|---|---|
| New Zealand (RMNZ) | Gold | 7,500^{*} |
^{*} Sales figures based on certification alone.

== Release history ==
| Country | Date | Format |
|---|---|---|
| New Zealand | 10 June 2010 | Digital download |
| New Zealand | 1 November 2011 | Digital download |
