= The Golden Echo =

Studio album by Kimbra
- Released: 19 August 2014
- Genre: Art pop
- Length: 60:03
- Label: Warner Bros.
- Producers: Keefus Ciancia; Rich Costey (also exec.); Taylor Graves; John Hill; Kimbra Johnson.Major Dudes; Mystery Skulls; M-Phazes; Al Shux; Surahn Sidhu; Dave Tozer; PolySlyme

Kimbra chronology
Vows (2011)	The Golden Echo (2014)	Primal Heart (2018)

Singles from The Golden Echo
- 1. "90s Music" Released: 19 May 2014; 2. "Miracle" Released: 24 July 2014; 3. "Goldmine" Released: 15 July 2015

The Golden Echo is the second studio album by New Zealand recording artist Kimbra, released by Warner Bros. Records in the United States on 19 August 2014.

== Background ==
Kimbra was inspired by Greek mythology for the album and spent time in a small sheep farm in the middle of Los Angeles. Kimbra went to the farm the day after the 2013 Grammys. "I'd been caught up with all the Grammy and Gotye stuff happening, and the touring, the constant affirmation— or praise, or criticism, or self-reflection— everywhere," she said. "You get wrapped up in it. Then here I was chilling with a bunch of sheep. And they don't give a crap who you are. You're not special to them. You spend time with them and there's this beautiful kind of harmony of how everything works in that environment. It was a really great space to create."

== Cover ==
The cover and all the photographs of The Golden Echo's booklet were shot by Thom Kerr, who also directed the music video for "Miracle".

== Critical reception ==
Professional ratings
Aggregate scores
Source	Rating
Metacritic	70/100
Review scores
Source	Rating
AllMusic	4/5 stars
Consequence of Sound	B−
Exclaim!	8/10
Los Angeles Times	3/4 stars
Paste	7/10
Pitchfork	4.3/10
PopMatters	5/10 stars
Rolling Stone Australia	4/5 stars
Spin	7/10

The Golden Echo received generally positive reviews from critics. On Metacritic, the album obtained a normalised score of 70 out of 100, based on reviews from 12 selected mainstream critics.

== Track listing ==
The Golden Echo — Standard edition
No.	Title	Writer(s)	Producer(s)	Length
1.	"Teen Heat"	Kimbra Johnson; Daniel Johns	Kimbra; Rich Costey	4:44
2.	"90s Music"	Johnson; Mark Foster; Timon Martin; Stephen McQuinn; Matt Morris	Kimbra; Costey; Major Dudes	3:36
3.	"Carolina"	Johnson; Keith Ciancia; Zachary Dawes; Tyler Parkford; Michael Shuman	Kimbra; Ciancia	4:18
4.	"Goldmine"	Johnson; Fraser Thornycroft-Smith	Kimbra; Costey; John Hill; Al Shux; M-Phazes^{[b]}	4:40
5.	"Miracle"	Johnson; Stephen Bruner; Johns	Kimbra; Costey; Mystery Skulls^{[b]}	4:49
6.	"Rescue Him"	Johnson; Surahn Sidhu	Kimbra; Sidhu	5:34
7.	"Madhouse"	Johnson; S. Bruner; Joel Whitley; Ron Bruner	Kimbra; Costey; M-Phazes^{[b]}	4:04
8.	"Everlovin' Ya" (featuring Bilal)	Johnson; Taylor Graves	Kimbra; Costey^{[a]}; Graves	4:44
9.	"As You Are"	Johnson; Johns	Kimbra; Costey^{[a]}	5:21
10.	"Love in High Places"	Johnson; Ciancia; Sonny J Mason; Morris; Kaveh Rastegar	Kimbra; Ciancia	5:15
11.	"Nobody But You"	Johnson; John Stephens; Sidhu; Dave Tozer	Kimbra; Costey; Tozer^{[a]}; Sidhu^{[a]}	5:22
12.	"Waltz Me to the Grave"	Johnson; PolySlyme	Kimbra; Costey^{[a]}; PolySlyme	7:30
Total length:				60:03

The Golden Echo — Vinyl edition
No.	Title	Writer(s)	Length
13.	"The Vanity Fair" (hidden track)	Johnson; Johns	3:52
Total length:			63:55

The Golden Echo — Deluxe edition
No.	Title	Writer(s)	Producer(s)	Length
13.	"Slum Love"	Johnson; PolySlyme	Kimbra; Costey	5:04
14.	"Sugar Lies"	Johnson; Francis White	Kimbra	4:10
15.	"The Magic Hour"	Johnson; White	Kimbra	4:31
Total length:				73:49

== Credits and personnel ==
Credits adapted from the liner notes of The Golden Echo

- Kimbra Johnson - vocals (all tracks); production (all tracks)
- Matt Bellamy - guitar (track 2)
- Bilal - featured artist
- Mario Borgatta - assistant
- Ron Bruner - writer (track 7)
- Thundercat - writer (tracks 5, 7)
- Keefus Ciancia - production (track 3)
- Martin Cooke - engineer
- Rich Costey - production (tracks 2, 4-5, 7-9, 11-12); executive producer; mixing
- Zachary Dawes - writer (track 3)
- Mark Foster - writer (track 2)
- Nicolas Fournier - engineer
- Fraser T. Smith - writer (track 4)
- Taylor Graves - writer and production (track 8)
- Nick Haussling - A&R
- Bo Hill - engineer
- John Hill - engineer
- Daniel Johns - writer (tracks 1, 5, 9)
- Thom Kerr - artwork and photography
- John Legend - writer (track 11)
- Bob Ludwig - mastering
- M-Phazes - production (track 5)
- Major Dudes - production (track 2)
- Timon Martin - writer (track 2)
- Sonny J. Mason - writer, drums (track 10)
- Stephen McQuinn - writer (track 2)
- Matt Morris - writer (tracks 2, 10)
- Tyler Parkford - writer (track 3)
- Kaveh Rastegar - writer (track 10)
- John "JR" Robinson - drums
- Omar Rodríguez-López - guitar (track 13)
- Michael Shuman - writer (track 3)
- Surahn "Sid" Sidhu - writing and production (track 6)
- Alex Tenta - design and layout
- Dave Tozer - writing and production (track 11)
- Lenny Waronker - A&R
- Ben Weinman - guitar (track 14)
- Joel Whitley - writer (track 7)
- PolySlyme - writing and production (track 12)

== Charts ==
Chart (2014)	Peak position
Australian Albums (ARIA)	5
New Zealand Albums (RMNZ)	5
US Billboard 200	43
