= Top of the World (Kimbra song) =

2017 single by Kimbra

Single by Kimbra

from the album Primal Heart
- Released: 10 November 2017
- Genre: Indie pop
- Length: 3:25
- Label: Warner Bros.
- Songwriters: Kimbra Johnson; Lars Horntveth; Sonny Moore
- Producers: Kimbra Johnson; John Congleton; Sonny Moore

Kimbra singles chronology
"Everybody Knows" (2017)	"Top of the World" (2017)	"Human" (2018)

Snoop Dogg singles chronology
"Smile Bitch" (2018)	"Top of the World" (2018)	"Bounce" (2018)

Alternative cover
- Cover for remix single featuring Snoop Dogg

Music video
- "Top of the World" on YouTube

"Top of the World" is a song by New Zealand indie pop singer Kimbra. It was released on 10 November 2017 as the second single from her third studio album Primal Heart (2018). A remix of the song featuring American rapper Snoop Dogg was released 20 July 2018.

== Music video ==
The official music video for "Top of the World" was directed by Guy Franklin. In the video Kimbra sings among columns that fall around her.

== Chart positions ==
Chart (2017)	Peak position
NZ Hot 20 Singles	9
