= Good Intent =

Single by Kimbra

from the album Vows
- Released: 15 August 2011
- Recorded: 2011
- Genre: Indie pop; soul; jazz; blues
- Length: 3:32
- Label: Warner Bros.
- Songwriters: Francois Tetaz; Kimbra Johnson
- Producer: François Tétaz

Kimbra singles chronology
"Somebody That I Used to Know" (2011)	"Good Intent" (2011)	"Warrior" (2012)

"Good Intent" is a song by New Zealand singer Kimbra from her debut studio album, Vows (2011). The song was released in New Zealand and Australia on 15 August 2011 as the third single from the album. The single peaked at number 98 on the Australian Singles Chart. It also came No. 52 in the Triple J Hottest 100, 2011.

== Background ==
The meaning of this song is overall when someone has good intentions that don't work out in the end and can impact the person's reputation. In this case, the good intent is being used against the person by the one singing the song.

== Composition ==
"Good Intent" (2011)
A 22-second sample of the first chorus of "Good Intent".

This song is composed in the key of E♭ minor and has the BPM of 122. The song uses stereotypical jazz, scat and ska elements and is recognized as a soul, jazz, blues and indie pop song.

== Music video ==
A music video to accompany the release of "Good Intent" was first released onto YouTube on 25 August 2011 at a total length of four minutes and thirty seconds. The music video begins with Kimbra in a vanity mirror, dressed in black, white, and red versions of herself. And a man wearing white, black, and gray, are in a red tinted alley way. As the song begins, the three versions of Kimbra are lip syncing in the mirror. The man in the alley had three versions of himself as well, dancing by himself and with his others. Kimbra begins to sing on a stage as the other two versions of herself sing with her, and the man in the alley comes into the room with the other two of him. Each Kimbra and man get together and dance with the other people in the room until the song ends.

== Track listing ==
- Digital download
1. "Good Intent" – 3:32

== Credits and personnel ==
- Lead vocals – Kimbra
- Songwriters – Kimbra Johnson, Francois Tetaz
- Producers – François Tétaz
- Label: Warner Bros. Records

== Chart performance ==
Chart (2011)	Peak position
Australia (ARIA)	98

== Release history ==
Country	Date	Format
Australia	15 August 2011	Digital download
New Zealand	15 August 2011	Digital download
