= Vows (album) =

Studio album by Kimbra
- Released: 29 August 2011
- Recorded: 2008–2011
- Genre: Art pop
- Length: 50:09
- Label: Warner Bros.
- Producers: A-Trak; François Tétaz; Greg Kurstin; Isom Innis; Keefus Green; Kimbra; Michael Tayler; Mike Elizondo; M-Phazes

Kimbra chronology
Vows (2011)	The Golden Echo (2014)

Singles from Vows
- 1. "Settle Down" Released: 10 June 2010; 2. "Cameo Lover" Released: 29 March 2011; 3. "Good Intent" Released: 15 August 2011; 4. "Warrior" Released: 4 May 2012; 5. "Two Way Street" Released: 17 May 2012; 6. "Come into My Head" Released: 20 September 2012

Vows is the debut studio album by New Zealand singer Kimbra. The album was recorded between 2008 and 2011 and was released on 29 August 2011 in New Zealand, and on 2 September in Australia by Warner Bros. Records. Vows has spawned 3 charting singles, "Settle Down", "Cameo Lover" and "Good Intent".

Vows opened at number three on the RIANZ Albums Chart in its first week after release, with "Settle Down" re-entering the singles chart at number 37. In Australia, the album debuted at number five on the ARIA Albums Chart, later peaking at number four. Vows has been certified Platinum in Australia for shipment of 70,000 units and Platinum in New Zealand for sales of 15,000 units.

At the J Awards of 2011, the album was nominated for Australian Album of the Year.

On 4 May 2012, the album was re-released with six new songs, new mixing and was mastered by Colin Leonard in Atlanta, US. It was released in Australia as Vows: Australian Tour Edition to coincide with her winter 2012 tour and included 6 previously unreleased songs. This edition of the album was released in New Zealand on 11 May 2012 as Vows: Deluxe Edition. On 22 May 2012 Vows was released to the North American market, debuting at number 14 on the Billboard 200. The album artwork including body art and illustrations were created by Rhys Mitchell and Raphael Rizzo.

== Writing and development ==
Kimbra was originally discovered by her soon-to-be manager, Mark Richardson at the age of 17. Shortly after being discovered by Mark, she moved to Melbourne, Australia to follow her path in the music industry, signing with Forum 5. Kimbra started recording and writing the album in 2008. The album's lead single Settle Down was the earliest song she had written, being when she was sixteen years old. Kimbra recorded the album at her home and other various studios throughout Australia. The songs on the record follow a theme of love, loss, romance and want.

== Composition ==
Musically, Kimbra was heavily influenced by Björk, The Mars Volta, Jeff Buckley, Rufus Wainwright and others during the creation of Vows. She wanted the album to have an overall jazzy feel, thus trying make a record that pushes boundaries but still be considered "pop music". She found Nina Simone as a huge inspiration for the track Plain Gold Ring. Kimbra has said many times that she chose the singles for this album by visualizing music videos for each of the songs and chose the top six ideas. The genres of the album consist of indie pop, soul, jazz, and art pop. Kimbra has stated the following quote as a summary of the album's concept and overall feel: "Vows say a lot about who you are, and even more when we choose to break them."

== Critical reception ==
Professional ratings
Aggregate scores
Source	Rating
Metacritic	72/100
Review scores
Source	Rating
AllMusic	3.5/5 stars
Entertainment Weekly	A
The Guardian	2/5 stars
Herald Sun	3.5/5 stars
The Music Network	(favourable)
The New Zealand Herald	4/5 stars
Paste	7/10
PopMatters	7/10
Rolling Stone	3.5/5 stars
Slant Magazine	3.5/5 stars

Vows received generally favorable reviews, obtaining a normalised score of 72 out of 100 from Metacritic, based on reviews from 16 selected mainstream critics. Lydia Jenkin, of The New Zealand Herald's Time Out magazine, gave Vows 4/5 stars, praising Kimbra's "exciting vocal experiments on this colourful debut with impressive range". Jody Rosen of Rolling Stone gave a positive review of the album, comparing the material to that of Björk.

== Singles ==
- "Settle Down" was released as the album's lead single on 10 June 2010 and was re-released on 1 November 2011. The song peaked at number 37 on the New Zealand Singles Chart.
- "Cameo Lover" was released as the album's second single on 29 March 2011.
- "Good Intent" was released as the album's third single on 15 August 2011. The song peaked at number 98 on the Australian Singles Chart.
- "Warrior" was released as the album's fourth single on 4 May 2012. The song appears on the Australian Tour Edition/New Zealand Deluxe Edition and the standard North American and European editions of Vows. The song peaked at number 22 on the New Zealand Singles Chart.
- "Two Way Street" was released as the album's fifth single on 17 May 2012.
- "Come into My Head" was released as the album's sixth and final single, with a music video released on 20 September 2012. This song was also featured in the ending credits of the 2013 movie The Heat.

== Artwork ==
The album artwork including body art and illustrations were created by Rhys Mitchell and Raphael Rizzo. It consisted of Kimbra's body painted white with black body art on, and standing in front of a white background.

== Track listing ==
Vows – Original release
No.	Title	Writer(s)	Producer(s)	Length
1.	"Settle Down"	Kimbra Johnson; François Tétaz	Tétaz; M-Phazes^{[a]}	4:17
2.	"Cameo Lover"	Johnson	Johnson; M-Phazes	4:02
3.	"Two Way Street"	Johnson; Tétaz	Johnson; Tétaz	4:28
4.	"Old Flame"	Johnson; Tétaz	Johnson; Tétaz	4:27
5.	"Good Intent"	Johnson; Tétaz	Tétaz	3:32
6.	"Plain Gold Ring"	George Stone	Tétaz	4:02
7.	"Call Me"	Johnson; Mark Landon	M-Phazes	4:32
8.	"Limbo"	Johnson	Johnson; Michael Tayler	3:51
9.	"Wandering Limbs" (featuring Sam Lawrence)	Johnson	Johnson; Tayler	5:26
10.	"Withdraw"	Johnson	Johnson	4:06
11.	"The Build Up"	Johnson; Tétaz	Tétaz	5:02
12.	"Somebody Please" (hidden track after 1:00 of silence)			2:20
Total length:				50:09

Vows – Special edition "Live at Sing Sing Studios" DVD
No.	Title	Length
1.	"Good Intent"	3:43
2.	"Settle Down"	4:27
3.	"Two Way Street"	4:48
4.	"Plain Gold Ring"	4:32
5.	"Cameo Lover"	4:59

Vows – Australian tour edition / New Zealand deluxe edition (bonus disc)
No.	Title	Writer(s)	Producer(s)	Length
1.	"Come into My Head"	Johnson; Keith Ciancia; Sonny J Mason	Keefus Green	4:39
2.	"Something in the Way You Are"	Johnson; Ciancia; Mike Elizondo	Elizondo	4:23
3.	"Sally I Can See You"	Johnson; Greg Kurstin	Kurstin	3:58
4.	"Posse"	Johnson; Kurstin	Kurstin	5:07
5.	"Home"	Johnson; Brian Jacobs; David Tobias	Green	3:04
6.	"Warrior" (featuring Mark Foster and A-Trak)	Johnson; Mark Foster; Alain Macklovitch; Isom Innis	Foster; A-Trak; Innis	4:16
Total length:				25:27

Vows – North American and European iTunes standard edition
No.	Title	Writer(s)	Producer(s)	Length
1.	"Settle Down"	Kimbra Johnson; François Tétaz	Tétaz; M-Phazes^{[a]}	4:02
2.	"Something in the Way You Are"	Johnson; Ciancia; Mike Elizondo	Elizondo	4:23
3.	"Cameo Lover"	Johnson	Johnson; M-Phazes	4:03
4.	"Two Way Street"	Johnson; Tétaz	Johnson; Tétaz	4:20
5.	"Old Flame"	Johnson; Tétaz	Johnson; Tétaz	4:30
6.	"Good Intent"	Johnson; Tétaz	Tétaz	3:32
7.	"Plain Gold Ring" (live)	George Stone	Johnson	4:32
8.	"Come into My Head"	Johnson; Keith Ciancia; Sonny J Mason	Keefus Green	4:39
9.	"Sally I Can See You"	Johnson; Greg Kurstin	Kurstin	3:58
10.	"Posse"	Johnson; Kurstin	Kurstin	5:07
11.	"Home"	Johnson; Brian Jacobs; David Tobias	Green	3:04
12.	"The Build Up"	Johnson; Tétaz	Tétaz	5:06
13.	"Warrior" (featuring Mark Foster and A-Trak)	Johnson; Mark Foster; Alain Macklovitch; Isom Innis	Foster; A-Trak; Innis	4:16
Total length:				55:24

Vows – North American and European physical edition
No.	Title	Writer(s)	Producer(s)	Length
14.	"Wandering Limbs" (featuring Sam Lawrence) (hidden track)	Johnson	Johnson; Michael Tayler	5:26
Total length:				60:50

Vows – North American and European iTunes deluxe edition
No.	Title	Writer(s)	Producer(s)	Length
14.	"Call Me"	Johnson; Mark Landon	M-Phazes	5:26
15.	"Plain Gold Ring"	Stone	Tétaz	5:26
16.	"Limbo"	Johnson	Johnson; Michael Tayler	5:26

Vows Remixes
No.	Title	Remix	Length
1.	"Two Way Street"	Damian Taylor remix	6:12
2.	"Old Flame"	Claude VonStroke remix	4:07
3.	"Come into My Head"	M-Phazes remix	4:53
4.	"Posse"	Brass Knuckles remix	4:34
5.	"Settle Down"	Justin Warfield remix	4:44
6.	"Plain Gold Ring"	Blue Sky Black Death remix	4:28
7.	"Warrior"	Moonlight Matters remix	6:43
Total length:			35:41

Notes

- ^{^[a]} signifies an additional producer
- "Home" features excerpts from the Apes & Androids recording, "Locked in a Car".

== Personnel ==
If New Zealand deluxe edition tracks are tracks 12–17:

- Kimbra – lead vocals (all tracks), production (tracks 2–4, 8–10), mixing (tracks 3, 4, 7–9), engineering (tracks 14, 15)
- François Tétaz – production, mixing (tracks 1, 3–6, 11)
- Michael Tayler – mixing (tracks 2, 7–10), production (tracks 8, 9)
- Colin Leonard – mastering (tracks 12–17)
- Phil Tan – mixing (tracks 12, 13, 15, 16)
- Daniela Rivera – additional engineering (tracks 12, 13, 15, 16)
- Greg Kurstin – production, engineering (track 14, 15)
- M-Phazes – production (tracks 2, 7), additional production (track 1)
- Mark Foster – vocals, production, mixing (track 17)
- Jimi Maroudas – engineering (tracks 2, 10)
- Keefus Green – production (tracks 12, 16)
- Michael Harris – engineering (tracks 12, 16)
- Jesse Shatkin – engineering (track 14, 15)
- Isom Innis – production, mixing (track 17)
- Ryan Ritchie – additional programming (track 2)
- Mike Elizondo – production (track 13)
- Brent Arrowood – engineering (track 13)
- Adam Hawkins – engineering (track 13)
- Chris Sporleder – assistant engineering (track 13)
- A-Trak – production (track 17)

== Charts and certifications ==
=== Weekly charts ===
Chart (2011–2012)	Peak position
Australian Albums (ARIA)	4
Belgian Albums Chart (Flanders)	135
Belgian Albums Chart (Wallonia)	186
Canadian Albums Chart	24
Dutch Albums Chart	95
New Zealand Albums Chart	3
New Zealand NZ Artists Albums Chart	1
Polish Albums Chart	23
US Billboard 200	14

=== Year-end charts ===
Chart (2011)	Position
Australian Albums Chart	39
Chart (2012)	Position
Australian Albums Chart	50

=== Certifications ===
Region	Certification	Certified units/sales
Australia (ARIA)	Platinum	70,000^{^}
New Zealand (RMNZ)	Platinum	15,000^{^}
^{^} Shipments figures based on certification alone.
