= Two Way Street (song) =

2012 single by Kimbra

Single by Kimbra

from the album Vows
- Released: 17 May 2012
- Recorded: 2011
- Genre: Indie pop
- Length: 4:20
- Label: Warner Bros.
- Songwriters: Kimbra; François Tétaz
- Producer: François Tétaz

Kimbra singles chronology
"Warrior" (2012)	"Two Way Street" (2012)	"Come into My Head" (2012)

Music video
- "Two Way Street" on YouTube

"Two Way Street" is a song performed and co-written by New Zealand recording artist Kimbra and Australian producer François Tétaz and produced by Tétaz. It was issued as the fifth single from Kimbra's debut album Vows.

== Critical reception ==
The song has received mainly positive reviews from critics. Many critics stated that the song is "better than her song with Gotye", with writer Jens Ulvedahl Carlsen giving the song a B rating.

== Live performances ==
Kimbra performed the song, along with the rest of the album, at Sing Sing Studios in Melbourne, Australia on 28 September 2010, two years before the song's official release. She went on to perform the song on Triple J and at the Billboard Tastemakers LIVE concert series.

== Music video ==
The official music video for "Two Way Street" was directed by Matthew Rolston. It premiered online on 12 July 2012. The music video shows Kimbra wearing a bustier/flouncy skirt. Refinery29 noted the singer's style and described the song as having a "lo-fi vibe".

== Chart positions ==
Chart (2012)	Peak position
New Zealand Artists (RIANZ)	6
