= Kimbra =

New Zealander singer and songwriter (born 1990)

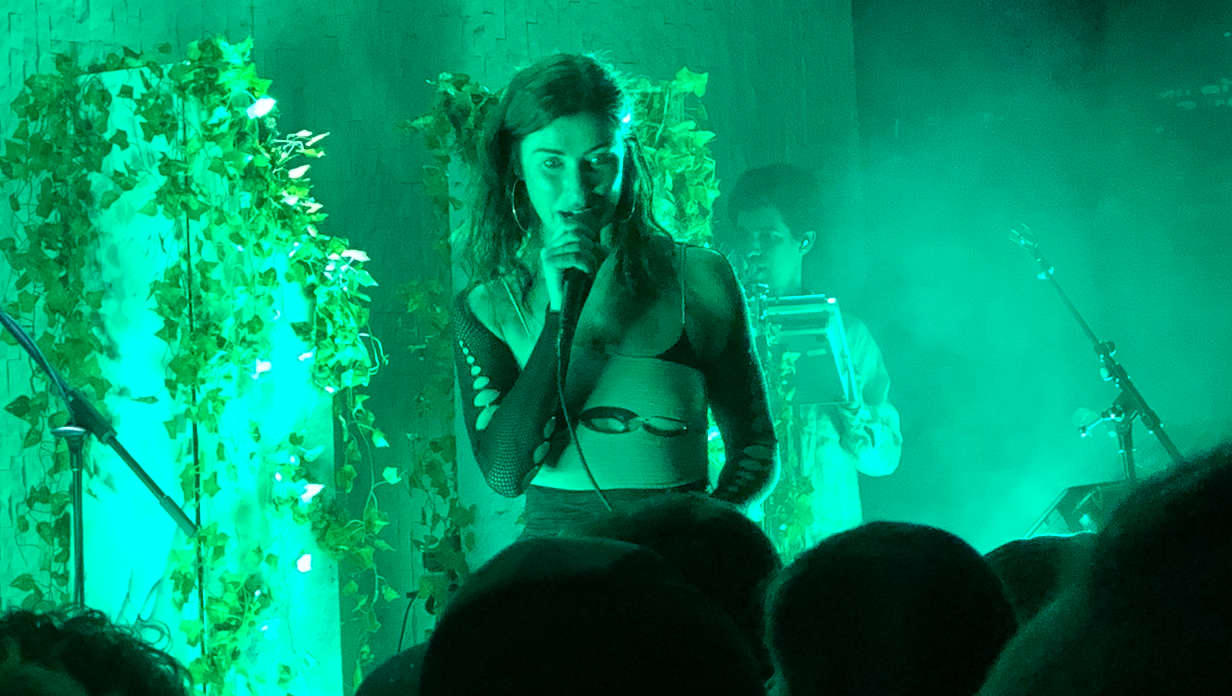
- Kimbra performing in 2023

Background information
- Born: Kimbra Lee Johnson; 27 March 1990 (age 36); Hamilton, New Zealand
- Genres: Pop; progressive pop; R&B; indie rock; art pop
- Occupations: Singer; songwriter
- Instrument: Vocals
- Years active: 2000–present
- Labels: Forum 5; Warner; Inertia; PIAS Group
- Website: kimbramusic.com

Kimbra Lee Johnson (born 27 March 1990), known mononymously as Kimbra, is a New Zealand singer and songwriter. Known for mixing pop with R&B, jazz and rock musical elements, her accolades include four ARIA Music Awards, two Grammy Awards and seven New Zealand Music Awards.

Kimbra's debut album, Vows, was released in 2011. Singles from the album include "Settle Down", "Cameo Lover" (which won an Australian Recording Industry Association Award), "Good Intent" and "Two Way Street". A reworked version of the album was released in Europe and the United States in 2012. It featured several new songs, including "Come into My Head", "Warrior" (on which Kimbra was joined by musicians Mark Foster from Foster the People and DJ A-Trak), and a cover of Nina Simone's "Plain Gold Ring". Vows reached the top 5 in New Zealand and Australia. In May 2012, the album was released in North America; debuting at number 14 on the Billboard 200, it is her highest-charting album.

A portrait of Kimbra by Vincent Fantauzzo was a finalist for the 2012 Archibald Prize. The portrait was painted in conjunction with the making of a video featuring her song "The Build Up". Kimbra was featured on the 2011 Diamond single "Somebody That I Used to Know" by Gotye; the single became her first number-one single on the US Billboard Hot 100 and earned them two awards at the 55th Annual Grammy Awards, including for Record of the Year, making her the third New Zealand singer to win a Grammy Award. Her second studio album, The Golden Echo, was released in 2014 to positive critical reception, and her third album, Primal Heart, was released in 2018. Her fourth album, A Reckoning, was released on 27 January 2023. She recorded a fifth studio album with several collaborators; titled Idols & Vices (Vol. 1), the album was released in September 2024.

== Early life ==
Kimbra Lee Johnson was born on 27 March 1990 born and raised in Hamilton, New Zealand. Her father, Ken Johnson, was the head doctor at the University of Waikato's student health centre, and her mother, Chris, was an orthopaedic nurse. At the age of 10, Kimbra began writing songs. When she was 12, her father bought her a guitar and after a few years of lessons, she was on stage, performing with her guitar tutors. Kimbra attended Hillcrest High School, competing in the national schools' musical competition Rockquest for three years running, where she was awarded second place in 2004 at the age of 14. An early recording of hers from 2004, "It Takes Time" was featured by Play It Strange, a New Zealand organisation showcasing young singers and songwriters. Kimbra made her first music video, "Smile", for the children's TV show What Now. Kimbra was a member of the Hillcrest High jazz choir, Scat.

== Career ==
Early public performances by Kimbra included singing at the Waikato Times Gold Cup race meeting in 2000 as a 10-year-old and singing the New Zealand national anthem before 27,000 people at the 2002 NPC rugby union final. In 2007, after winning the Juice TV award for Best Breakthrough music video for her second single "Simply on My Lips", she came to the attention of ex-Independiente Records boss Mark Richardson (Jamiroquai, Paula Abdul) and his newly formed management company and independent label Forum 5 in Melbourne, Victoria. She signed with Richardson and in 2008 she moved to Melbourne.

=== 2010–2013: Vows and awards success ===
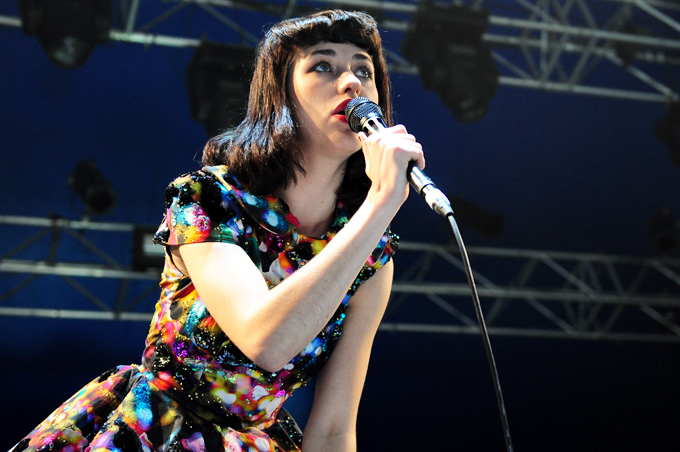
Kimbra in 2011

In June 2010, Kimbra's first single on Forum 5, "Settle Down", was released. She had started writing the track four years earlier – it was finished with François Tétaz. The music video was directed by Guy Franklin. Perez Hilton featured the track on his website citing "[i]f you like Nina Simone, Florence & the Machine and/or Björk, then we think you will enjoy Kimbra – her music reminds us of all those fierce ladies!" On 10 December, the Australian 'indietronica' group Miami Horror released their single, "I Look to You" featuring Kimbra's vocals. Kimbra also stars in its music video, which features wide-angle and kaleidoscope shots of her in face paint and dresses walking through golden fields. Early in 2011, Kimbra's song "Cameo Lover" was a finalist for the 2011 Vanda & Young Songwriting Competition and eventually won the competition. In March she issued "Cameo Lover" as her next single, its music video was released in April and was directed by Franklin. On 13 March, Kimbra went to perform for Moomba Festival and ChillOut Festival in Sydney at Oxford Arts Factory to welcome the release of her next single, "Cameo Lover". On 15 July 2011, "Cameo Lover" won the songwriting competition, ahead of third placed song, "Somebody That I Used to Know", written by Australian musician Gotye. On 7 June Kimbra signed to Warner Bros. Records New Zealand for distribution in New Zealand and Australia, as well as a worldwide deal for other territories with Warner Bros. Records in the US. On 5 July Kimbra sang in Gotye's single, "Somebody That I Used to Know", which was mixed by Tétaz. Tétaz had recommended Kimbra to Gotye after a 'high-profile' Australian female vocalist had withdrawn from the collaboration.

On 29 August 2011, Kimbra's debut album, Vows, was released in New Zealand and 2 September in Australia. In its first week of release it charted at No. 3 in New Zealand, No. 5 in Australia and No. 14 in the US. In its second week, it rose to No. 4 on the ARIA Albums Chart. Australian producer M-Phazes produced Kimbra's track "Call Me" and assisted on other tracks on Vows. Its artwork including body art and illustrations were created by Rhys Mitchell and Raphael Rizzo. She has won the Critics' Choice Prize at the 2011 New Zealand Music Awards and Best Female Artist and Best Song (for "Cameo Lover") at the ARIA Music Awards of 2011. The US release of Vows featured new tracks not available on the Australian or New Zealand version of the album. She had performed in various location such as at the Forum Theatre, Melbourne on 9 September 2011, at Astor Theatre, Perth on 17 September 2011, at the Adelaide Botanic Garden in Brisbane on 1 October 2011, at Adelaide, Australia on 3 October 2011, at Queenscliff Music Festival, Queenscliff, Victoria and Wellington Square, Perth on 25 November 2011, at Homebake Festival 2011, at Royal Botanic Gardens, Sydney on 3 December 2011 and at the Falls Festival in Lorne, Australia on 30 December 2011.

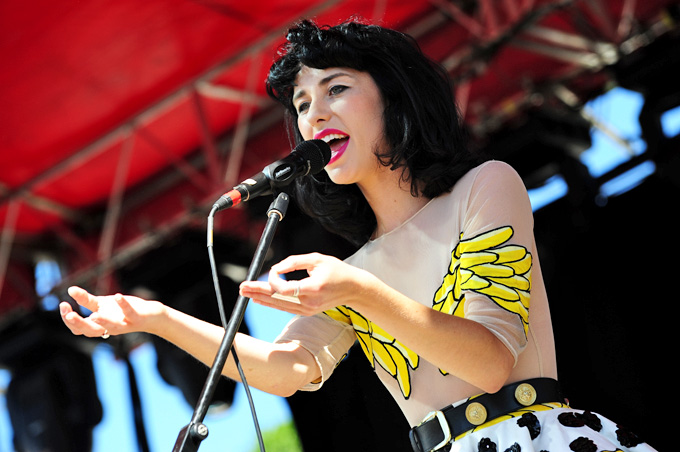
Kimbra performing in 2012

On 19 January 2012, "Good Intent" was played on an episode of ABC's drama Grey's Anatomy. The track also appears in the video game, The Sims 3: Pets, which Kimbra recorded in Simlish for the soundtrack. Also in January, Kimbra won the "One to Watch" award at the 2012 Rolling Stone Awards. Kimbra has collaborated with Mark Foster (of Foster the People) and DJ A-Trak on the track "Warrior", which was released on 2 April. On 14 April, she performed "Somebody That I Used to Know" with Gotye on Saturday Night Live. On 15 July 2012, she performed in Santralistanbul, Istanbul, Turkey. On 25 September, her song "With My Hands" was featured in Tim Burton's movie, Frankenweenie. On 1 November, she had been nominated at the Vodafone 2012 New Zealand Music Awards and won for the International Achievement, Best Female Solo Artist, Best Pop Album, Breakthrough Artist of the Year awards, and also won as a featured artist for the song "Somebody That I Used to Know", for Most Played Australian Work and Song of the Year, at the APRA Music Awards of 2012. on the same year, she also received an award for Best Female Artist at the ARIA Music Awards of 2012 for the second time. On 14 November 2012, Kimbra performed at the Calvin Klein Collection which held an exclusive dinner to celebrate the brand's Women's Creative Director, Francisco Costa. Kimbra also performed for other events such as, at Homebake Festival 2012 on 8 December, at Festival of the Sun in Port Macquarie, New South Wales on 14 December, at the Rhythm & Vines Music festival 2012 in Gisborne, New Zealand on 29 December 2012 and at the Summadayze Festival in Adelaide, Melbourne, Gold Coast on 30, 31 December 2012.

On 10 February 2013, Kimbra and Gotye won the Record of the Year and Best Pop Duo/Group Performance awards at the 55th Annual Grammy Awards Show for "Somebody That I Used to Know". This achievement made her only the third New Zealand singer to win a Grammy Award in history. Kimbra was also featured with the R&B singer John Legend in the song "Made to Love", published in the album Love in the Future. The single was released on 11 June 2013 and the album was released on 30 August 2013. On 15 September 2013, Kimbra performed for Rock in Rio Festival in Rio de Janeiro, Brazil. Kimbra was also involved in a non-profit charity organisation called So They Can. Kimbra became the ambassador of So They Can within the year of 2013.

=== 2014–2018: The Golden Echo and Primal Heart ===
After the Grammy Awards, Kimbra relocated to LA to work on her second studio album, known as The Golden Echo, taking up residence on a farm. People who collaborated on The Golden Echo include Rich Costey, Daniel Johns, Taylor Graves, Matt Bellamy, Thundercat, Mark Foster, Bilal (Singing on the No. 8 track "Everlovin' Ya"), John Legend, John Robinson and also Kimbra's bandmates, Timon Martin and Benjamin Davey. During the making of the second album, Kimbra was invited to play at a concert in Adelaide and was invited to perform at WOMAD 2014, also debuting a new song titled "Nobody But You". On 19 May 2014, Kimbra released the lead single from The Golden Echo called "90s Music" to largely positive reviews. Jason Lipshutz of Billboard called the song "captivating" when he previewed it in May 2014. The official music video was not long released after the audio, debuting on YouTube on 3 June 2014. The song did not chart in New Zealand or Australia. "Miracle" was released as the second single on 24 July 2014. It was her first song to chart on Billboard, peaking at No. 37 on the Japan Hot 100. The song has received mainly positive reviews from critics, with many complimenting the song's disco-influenced feel. Olivia Forman of Spin stated that the song has a "flawlessly fluctuating [...] beat" and additionally complimented Kimbra's vocals. The music video for "Miracle" was released onto YouTube on 19 August 2014, the official music video for the song was directed by Thom Kerr. The Golden Echo was released on 15 August 2014 (AU/NZ) and 19 August 2014 (US) charting Australian Albums (ARIA) at 5, New Zealand Albums (RMNZ) at 5 and US Billboard 200 at 43. The Golden Echo received generally positive reviews from critics. On Metacritic, the album obtained a normalised score of 70 out of 100, based on reviews from 16 selected mainstream critics. The release of the album was followed by a 12-show US tour with Empress of in November 2015.

In April 2015, Kimbra toured the US with a total of five shows. Kimbra is featured in a song by Bilal called "Holding It Back" from his album In Another Life. On 15 July, Kimbra released the video for her third single from The Golden Echo called "Goldmine", which surpassed 110,000 views in a matter of a day. On 30 September 2016, Kimbra released a non-album single called "Sweet Relief". On 18 September 2017, Kimbra and her record label sent a personalised email to fans who subscribed to the Warner Bros. mailing list, conveying information about her third studio-album and an upcoming single. Kimbra is managed by guitarist Ben Weinman, founding member of metal band The Dillinger Escape Plan, since around 2017. He has also frequently contributed guitar to Kimbra's music.

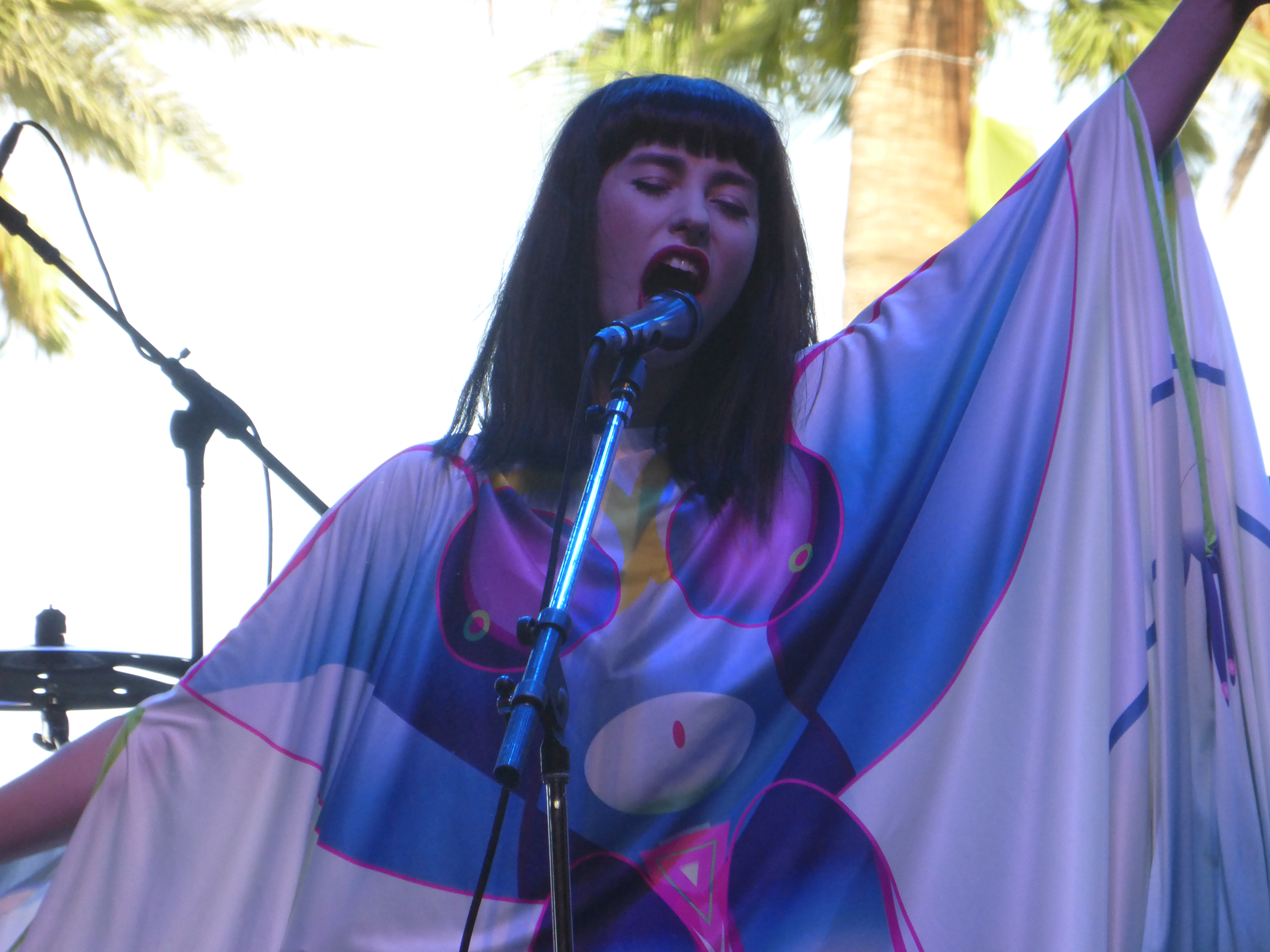
Kimbra performing in 2015

On 29 September 2017, she released the album's lead single, entitled "Everybody Knows", which was co-produced by Nelly Furtado and Goldfrapp affiliate John Congleton. "Top of the World" was released as the second single on 10 November 2017 and was later performed on Late Night with Seth Meyers. The third album Primal Heart was initially planned to be released on 19 January 2018, but was then pushed back to 20 April 2018. Kimbra explained the reasons for the push back and gave a song out for free to fans subscribed to her mailing list to make it up to them. The song is called "Hi Def Distance Romance". A further three more singles were released before the album release, those being "Human" on 19 January 2018, "Version of Me" on 23 February 2018, and "Like They Do on the TV" on 30 March 2018. A new version of "Version of Me" featuring Dawn Richard was released on 21 June 2018, and a new version of "Top of the World" featuring Snoop Dogg was released on 20 July 2018.

=== 2019–present: Film and television, A Reckoning, and Idols & Vices ===
Kimbra made her acting debut in a big screen adaption of the musical-drama production Daffodils released on 21 March 2019. The singer stars alongside Kiwi lead actors Rose McIver, from iZombie and The Lovely Bones and George Mason, from Home and Away and Go Girls. In March 2020, Kimbra released a course with online music school Soundfly on vocal creativity, arranging, and production. In April 2020, she appeared as the lead expert and mentor on TVNZ 2's reboot of Popstars.

Kimbra embarked on a Sofar Sounds secret location venue tour of the United States in October and November 2021, previewing her upcoming fourth studio album. Her fourth album, A Reckoning, was released on 27 January 2023. She released her first collaborative album and fifth release overall, Idols & Vices, Vol. 1, in September 2024. The album was recorded with several different featured artists including Sahtyre, BANKS, Tommy Raps, Ivy Sole, Fatboi Sharif, Le Asha, DRAM, Dawn Richard, and Taylor Graves.

For the upcoming animated film Ray Gunn, Kimbra wrote three songs, all performed by Scarlett Johansson. One of the songs, "Too Much to Ask", will campaign for a Academy Award for Best Original Song.

== Live band ==
- Jacob Bergson – keyboards (2018–present), musical director (2021–present)
- Vancil Cooper – drums (2021–present)

=== Previous members ===
- Fagan Wilcox – samples/synth/guitar/vocals (2009–2014)
- Ben Davey – keyboards/vocals (2010–2014)
- Stan Bicknell – drums (2009–2010)
- Joe Cope (2009)
- Stevie McQuinn – drums (2010–2016)
- Frank Abraham – bass/keyboards (2014–2016)
- Taylor Graves – keyboards/vocals (2014–2016)
- Timon Martin – guitar, backing vocals (2009–2018), keyboards (2016–2018)
- Spencer Zahn – bass, keyboards (2016–2021)

== Artistry ==
Muzic.net.nz states that Kimbra's music delves beyond the "four chord cliché but still maintains strong hooks and catchy melodies that are sometimes unpredictable but satisfying". In an interview with American Songwriter, she listed Daniel Johns, Prince, Rufus Wainwright, Guided by Voices, Imogen Heap, Mike Patton, Michael Jackson, Minnie Riperton and Stevie Wonder as her influences. Her musical style is eclectic.

== Personal life ==
Kimbra has stated that she has vitiligo, a chronic autoimmune disorder that causes patches of skin to lose pigment or color.

== Discography ==
- Vows (2011)
- The Golden Echo (2014)
- Primal Heart (2018)
- A Reckoning (2023)
- Idols & Vices (Vol. 1) (2024)

== Filmography ==
=== Television ===
Year	Title	Role	Notes
2011	RocKwiz	Herself/Musical Guest	Season 9, Episode 6
2012	Saturday Night Live	Herself/Musical Guest	Season 37, Episode 19
2012	Jimmy Kimmel Live!	Herself/Musical Guest	Season 10, Episode 19 - "John Krasinski/Eloise Mumford/Gotye"; Performed with Gotye
2012	The Tonight Show with Jay Leno	Herself/Musical Guest	Season 20, Episode - "Wanda Sykes/Rob Riggle/Kimbra"
2012	Project Runway Australia	Herself/Audience Member	
2012–2013	Last Call with Carson Daly	Herself/Musical Guest	2 episodes: Season 12, Episode 12 - "Sam Rockwell/Jordan Roberts/Kimbra", Episode 95 - "Deon Cole/Kimbra"
2013	Rock in Rio	Herself/Performer	Episode 5.3
2014	Late Show with David Letterman	Herself/Musical Guest	Season 22, Episode 45 - "Jennifer Lopez/Rob Riggle/Kimbra"
2014	Sesame Street	Herself/Guest Star	
2016	Rock & Roll Hall of Fame	Herself/Musical Guest	
2018	Late Night with Seth Meyers	Herself/Musical Guest	Season 5, Episode 60 - "John Kasich/Darren Criss/Kimbra/Nikki Glaspie"
2020	Helpsters	Herself/Guest Star	Apple TV+ series

=== Films ===
Year	Title	Role	Notes
2012	SXSW Flashback 2012	Herself/Performer	
2019	Daffodils	Maisie	

== Tours ==
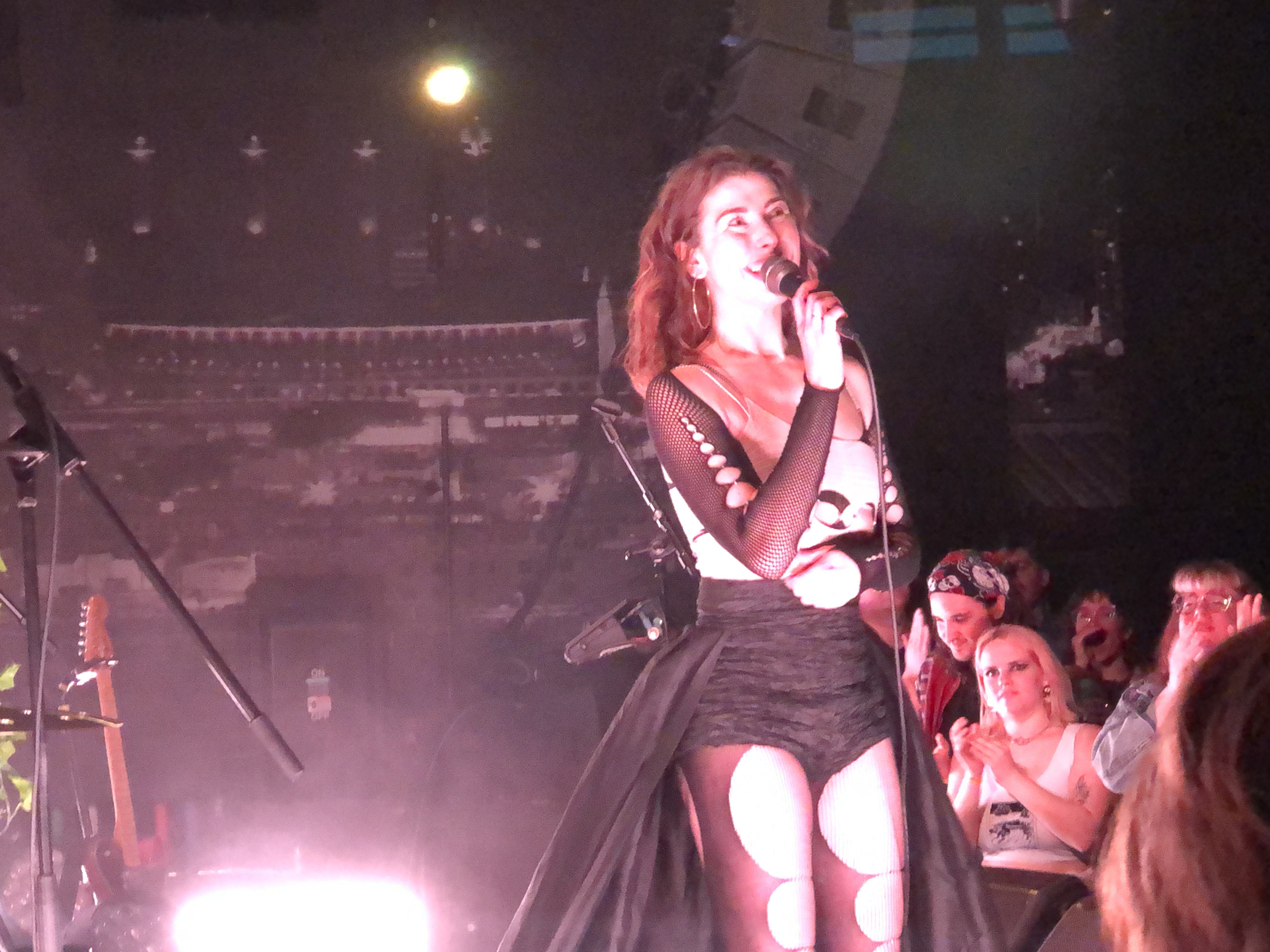
Kimbra on the A Reckoning tour, in 2023

- Vows Tour (2011)
  - World Wide Tour – (with Gotye) (2012)
  - Torches Tour with Foster the People, the Kooks, Tokyo Police Club, Mayer Hawthorne) (2012)
- Vows European Winter Tour (2012)
- Vows US Tour (2012)
- The Golden Electric Tour (with Janelle Monáe) (2014) – Cancelled
- The Golden Echo Tour (2014/2015)
- Primal Heart Tour (2017/2018)
- Primal Heart: Reimagined Tour (2018/2019)
- Album Preview Tour (2021)
- A Reckoning Tour (2023)
- Djesse Vol. 4 Tour (with Jacob Collier) (2024)
- Vows Reimagined: 15th Anniversary Tour (2026)

== Awards and nominations ==
=== APRA Awards ===
The APRA Awards are presented annually from 1982 by the Australasian Performing Right Association (APRA), "honouring composers and songwriters". In 2012, Kimbra was nominated for two awards as a solo artist and won two awards as a featured artist.

Year	Nominee / work	Award	Result
2012	Kimbra	Breakthrough Songwriter of the Year	Nominated
2012	"Somebody That I Used to Know" – Gotye featuring Kimbra	Most Played Australian Work	Won
2012	"Somebody That I Used to Know" – Gotye featuring Kimbra	Song of the Year	Won
2012	"Cameo Lover" – Kimbra	Song of the Year	Nominated

=== ARIA Awards ===
The ARIA Music Awards are presented annually from 1987 by the Australian Recording Industry Association (ARIA). In 2011, Kimbra won one award as a solo artist and two awards as a featured artist. Gotye featuring Kimbra performed the single, "Somebody That I Used to Know", at the awards ceremony.

Year	Nominee / work	Award	Result
2011	"Somebody That I Used to Know" – Gotye featuring Kimbra	Single of the Year	Won
2011	"Somebody That I Used to Know" – Gotye featuring Kimbra	Highest Selling Single	Nominated
2011	"Somebody That I Used to Know" – Gotye featuring Kimbra	Best Pop Release	Won
2011	"Cameo Lover" – Kimbra	Best Female Artist	Won
2011	"Cameo Lover" – Kimbra – Guy Franklin	Best Video	Nominated
2011	"Somebody That I Used to Know" – Gotye featuring Kimbra - (director Natasha Pincus)	Best Video	Won
2012	Vows – Kimbra	Best Female Artist	Won
2012	Vows – Kimbra	Best Pop Release	Nominated

=== Billboard Music Award ===
Year	Nominee / work	Award	Result
2013	"Somebody That I Used to Know"	Top Hot 100 Song	Won
2013	"Somebody That I Used to Know"	Top Digital Song	Nominated
2013	"Somebody That I Used to Know"	Top Radio Song	Won
2013	"Somebody That I Used to Know"	Top Streaming Song (Audio)	Won
2013	"Somebody That I Used to Know"	Top Rock Song	Won

=== Grammy Awards ===
The Grammy Awards are presented annually from 1959 by the National Academy of Recording Arts and Sciences (NARAS). In 2012, Kimbra's collaboration with Gotye, "Somebody That I Used To Know", won the Record of the Year and the Best Pop Duo/Group Performance awards.

Year	Nominee / work	Award	Result
2013	"Somebody That I Used to Know"	Record of the Year	Won
2013	"Somebody That I Used to Know"	Best Pop Duo/Group Performance	Won

=== International Dance Music Awards ===
Year	Nominee / work	Award	Result	Ref.
2013	"Somebody That I Used To Know"	Best Alternative/Indie Rock Dance Track	Won	

=== New Zealand Music Awards ===
The New Zealand Music Awards are awarded annually to musicians of New Zealand origin, by Recorded Music NZ.

Year	Nominee / work	Award	Result
2011	Kimbra	Critics' Choice Prize	Won
2012	Vows	Album of the Year	Won
2012	Vows	Best Pop Album	Won
2012	"Warrior"	Single of the Year	Nominated
2012	Kimbra	Breakthrough Artist of the Year	Won
2012	Kimbra	Best Female Solo	Won
2012	Kimbra	Peoples' Choice Award	Nominated
2012	Kimbra	International Achievement Award	Won
2018	Kimbra	Best Solo Artist	Nominated
2018	Kimbra	Best Pop Artist	Won

=== MTV Europe Music Award ===
Year	Nominee / work	Award	Result
2012	"Somebody That I Used to Know"	Best Song	Nominated
2012	Kimbra	Best Australia & New Zealand Act	Nominated
2014	Kimbra	Best New Zealand Act	Nominated
2018	Kimbra	Best New Zealand Act	Nominated

=== MTV Video Music Award ===
Year	Nominee / work	Award	Result
2012	"Somebody That I Used to Know"	Video of the Year	Nominated
2012	"Somebody That I Used to Know"	Best Editing	Nominated
2012	"Somebody That I Used to Know"	Most Share-Worthy Video	Nominated

=== mtvU Woodie Awards ===
Year	Nominee / work	Award	Result	Ref.
2012	"Somebody That I Used to Know"	Best Video Woodie	Nominated	
2013	"Warrior" (with Mark Foster and A-Trak)	Tag Team Woodie	Won	

=== Teen Choice Awards ===
Year	Nominee / work	Award	Result	Ref.
2012	Herself	Choice Music: Breakout Artist	Nominated	
2012	"Somebody That I Used to Know"	Choice Rock Song	Nominated	
2012	"Somebody That I Used to Know"	Choice Break-Up Song	Nominated	

=== Vanda & Young Global Songwriting Competition ===
The Vanda & Young Global Songwriting Competition is an annual competition that "acknowledges great songwriting whilst supporting and raising money for Nordoff-Robbins" and is coordinated by Albert Music and APRA AMCOS. It commenced in 2009.

Year	Nominee / work	Award	Result
2011	"Cameo Lover"	Vanda & Young Global Songwriting Competition	1st

=== Other awards ===
Year	Award	Category	Result
2007	Juice TV Awards	Breakthrough Video ("Simply on My Lips")	Won
2011	International Songwriting Competition	Grand Prize	Won
2011	J Award	Album of the Year (Vows)	Nominated
2011	J Award	Music Video of the Year ("Somebody That I Used to Know")	Nominated
2012	Rolling Stone	One to Watch Award	Won
2019	GAFFA-Prisen Awards	Best International Artist	Nominated
