= List of films: A =

indexed lists of films
0–9	A	B	C	D	E	F
G	H	I	J–K	L	M	N–O
P	Q–R	S	T	U–V–W	X–Y–Z	

This is an alphabetical list of film articles (or sections within articles about films). It includes made for television films. See the talk page for the method of indexing used.

== A ==
- A: (1965, 1998 Kannada & 1998 Japanese)
- A+ (2004)
- A Aa E Ee: (2009 Tamil & 2009 Telugu)
- A-ge-man (1990)
- A-Haunting We Will Go (1942)
- A-Haunting We Will Go (1966)
- The A-Team (2010)
- A.K.G. (2007)

=== Aa ===
- Aa Ab Laut Chalen (1999)
- Aa Aiduguru (2014)
- Aa Ammayi Gurinchi Meeku Cheppali (2022)
- Aa Bata Aama (2026)
- Aa Bb Kk (2018)
- Aa Chithrashalabham Parannotte (1970)
- Aa Dekhen Zara (2009)
- Aa Dinagalu (2007)
- Aa Divasam (1982)
- Aa Drushya (2019)
- Aa Gale Lag Jaa: (1973 & 1994)
- Aa Gaya Hero (2017)
- Aa Gaye Munde U.K. De (2014)
- Aa Jaa Sanam (1975)
- Aa Karaala Ratri (2018)
- Aa Naluguru (2004)
- Aa Neram Alppa Dooram (1985)
- Aa Nimisham (1977)
- Aa Okkadu (2009)
- Aa Okkati Adakku (1992)
- Aa Okkata Adakku (2024)
- Aa Raathri (1983)
- Aa Te Kevi Dunniya (2015)

==== Aaa–Aad ====
- Aaaaaaaah! (2015)
- Aaaah (2014)
- Aaag Hi Aag (1999)
- Aaah (2001)
- Aaahh Belinda (1986)
- Aabhaasam (2018)
- Aabhijathyam (1971)
- Aabhyanthara Kuttavaali (2025)
- Aabra Ka Daabra (2004)
- Aabroo (1943)
- Aabroo (1968)
- Aabshar (1953)
- Aachari Baa (2025)
- Aachariyangal (2012)
- Aacharya (2006)
- Aacharyan (1993)
- Aachi & Ssipak (2006)
- Aada Brathuku (1965)
- Aada Paduchu (1967)
- Aada Pettanam (1958)
- Aada Vandha Deivam (1960)
- Aadaalla Majaka (1995)
- Aadab Arz (1943)
- Aadai (2019)
- Aadama Jaichomada (2014)
- Aadamkhor (1986)
- Aadanthe Ado Type (2013)
- Aadara Hasuna (1986)
- Aadaraneeya Wassaanaya (2004)
- Aadarsa Kutumbam (1969)
- Aadarsam (1993)
- Aadarsham (1993)
- Aadat Se Majboor (1982)
- Aadavaallu Meeku Joharlu (1981)
- Aadavallu Meeku Joharlu (2022)
- Aadavari Matalaku Arthale Verule (2007)
- Aadhaaram (1992)
- Aadharsam (1982)
- Aadharshila (1982)
- Aadhi (2018)
- Aadhi Haqeeqat, Aadha Fasana (1990)
- Aadhi Mimansa (1991)
- Aadhi Raat (1950)
- Aadhi Raat Ke Baad (1965)
- Aadhi Thaalam (1990)
- Aadhityan (1993)
- Aadhya Paadam (1977)
- Aadhyamayi (1991)
- Aadhyathe Katha (1972)
- Aadi (2002)
- Aadi Mimansa (1991)
- Aadi Velli (1990)
- Aadipaapam (1979)
- Aadithya (1996)
- Aadmi (1939, 1968 & 1993)
- Aadmi Aur Aurat (1984)
- Aadmi Aur Insaan (1969)
- Aadmi Khilona Hai (1993)
- Aadmi Sadak Ka (1977)
- Aadu (2015)
- Aadu Magaadra Bujji (2013)
- Aadu Puli (2011)
- Aadu Puli Attam (1977)
- Aadukalam (2011)
- Aadum Koothu (2005)
- Aadyakiranangal (1964)
- Aadyathe Anuraagam (1983)
- Aadyathe Kanmani (1995)

==== Aaf–Aai ====
- Aafat (1977)
- Aafat-E-Ishq (2021)
- Aag: (1948, 1994 & 2007)
- Aag Aandhi Aur Toofan (1994)
- Aag Aur Chingari (1994)
- Aag Aur Daag (1970)
- Aag Aur Shola (1986)
- Aag Hi Aag (1987)
- Aag Ka Dariya (1953)
- Aag Ka Darya (1966)
- Aag Ka Gola (1990)
- Aag Ke Sholay (1988)
- Aag Laga Do Sawan Ko (1991)
- Aag Se Khelenge (1989)
- Aagaah: The Warning (2011)
- Aagadu (2014)
- Aagam (2016)
- Aagaman (1982)
- Aagamanam (1980)
- Aaganthuka (1986)
- Aagantuk (2023)
- Aagathan (2010)
- Aagaya Thamaraigal (1985)
- Aage Badho (1947)
- Aage Kadam (1943)
- Aage Ki Soch (1988)
- Aagey Se Right (2009)
- Aaghaat (2010)
- Aaghaatha (1995)
- Aaghaaz (2000)
- Aagneyam (1993)
- Aagos ang Dugo (2001)
- Aagraham: (1984 & 1991)
- Aah (1953)
- Aaha (2021)
- Aaha Kalyanam (2014)
- Aahaa..! (1997 & 1998)
- Aahaa Enna Porutham (1997)
- Aahaa Ethanai Azhagu (2003)
- Aahat (1982)
- Aahat – Ek Ajib Kahani (2010)
- Aahuthi (1987)
- Aahuti: (1950, 1978 & 1985)
- Aahwanam (1997)
- Aai (2004)
- Aai Bahar (1946)
- Aai Phirse Bahar (1960)
- Aai Thor Tujhe Upkar (1999)
- Aai Tuza Ashirwad (2004)
- Aaina: (1944, 1974 & 1993)
- Aainaate (2008)

==== Aaj–Aay ====
- Aaj (1987)
- Aaj Aur Kal: (1947, 1963 & 1976)
- Aaj Ka Andha Kanoon (2003)
- Aaj Ka Arjun (1990)
- Aaj Ka Daur (1985)
- Aaj Ka Goonda Raaj (1992)
- Aaj Ka Hindustan (1940)
- Aaj Ka Mahaatma (1976)
- Aaj Ka M.L.A. Ram Avtar (1984)
- Aaj Ka Ravan (2000)
- Aaj Ka Robin Hood (1988)
- Aaj Ka Samson (1991)
- Aaj Ka Ye Ghar (1976)
- Aaj Ke Angaare (1988)
- Aaj Ke Shahenshah (1990)
- Aaj Ki Awaaz (1984)
- Aaj Ki Baat (1955)
- Aaj Ki Dhara (1979)
- Aaj Ki Duniya (1940)
- Aaj Ki Raat (1948)
- Aaj Ki Taaza Khabar (1973)
- Aaj Kie Aurat (1993)
- Aaja Meri Jaan (1993)
- Aaja Mexico Challiye (2022)
- Aaja Nachle (2007)
- Aajcha Divas Majha (2013)
- Aakhree Raasta (1986)
- Aakrosh: (1980, 1998 & 2010)
- Aalvar (2006)
- Aamdani Atthani Kharcha Rupaiyaa (2001)
- Aamir (2008)
- Aan (1952)
- Aan: Men at Work (2004)
- Aanaval Mothiram (1990)
- Aandhi (1975)
- Aankh Michouli (1942)
- Aankhen: (1950, 1968, 1993 & 2002)
- Aao Pyaar Karen (1994)
- Aapathbandhavudu (1992)
- Aap Mujhe Achche Lagne Lage (2002)
- Aapo (1994)
- Aar Paar (1954)
- Aarakshan (2011)
- Aaron Loves Angela (1975)
- Aaru (2005)
- Aarzoo (1999)
- Aasai: (1956 & 1995)
- Aasai Aasaiyai (2003)
- Aasai Alaigal (1963)
- Aasai Manaivi (1977)
- Aasai Mugam (1965)
- Aasai Thambi (1998)
- Aasaiyil Oru Kaditham (1999)
- Aasal (2010)
- Aasha Encounter (2022)
- Aashayein (2010)
- Aashiq: (1962 & 2001)
- Aashiq Banaya Aapne: Love Takes Over (2005)
- Aashiq Awara (1993)
- Aashiq Banaya Aapne (2005)
- Aashiqui: (1990 & 2015)
- Aashiqui 2 (2013)
- Aathi (2006)
- Aatish: Feel the Fire (1994)
- Aatma: (2006 & 2013)
- Aaye Din Bahar Ke (1966)
- Aayitha Ezhuthu (2004)
- Aayushkalam (1992)

=== Ab ===
- Ab Ayega Mazaa (1984)
- Ab...Bas! (2004)
- Ab Dilli Dur Nahin (1957)
- Ab Dilli Dur Nahin (2023)
- Ab Hoga Dharna Unlimited (2012)
- Ab Tak Chhappan (2004)
- Ab Tak Chhappan 2 (2015)
- Ab To Aaja Saajan Mere (1994)
- Ab Tum Ja Saktey Ho (1996 TV)
- Ab Tumhare Hawale Watan Saathiyo (2004)

==== Aba ====
- Aba (2008)
- Abacus: Small Enough to Jail (2016)
- Abadan (2003)
- Abadan 1160 (2020)
- Abakada... Ina (2001)
- Abala (1973)
- Abalai Anjugam (1959)
- Aballay (2010)
- Abana (1958)
- Abandon (2002)
- Abandonada (2000)
- Abandoned: (1949, 1955, 2001, 2010, 2019 & 2022)
- The Abandoned: (1945, 2006, 2010, 2015 & 2022)
- Abandoned and Deceived (1995 TV)
- Abandoned Mine (2012)
- The Abandonment (1916)
- Abang Long Fadil (2014)
- Abang Long Fadil 2 (2017)
- Abang Long Fadil 3 (2022)
- Abar Aranye (2003)
- Abar Basanta Bilap (2018)
- Abar Bibaho Obhijaan (2023)
- Abar Bochhor Koori Pore (2022)
- Abar Boshonto (2019)
- Abar Byomkesh (2012)
- Abar Ekla Cholo (2016 TV)
- Abar, the First Black Superman (1977)
- Abar Kanchanjungha (2022)
- Abar Proloy (2023)
- Abar Tora Manush Ho (1973)
- Abashiri Prison (1965)
- Abatar (1941)
- Abattoir (2016)

==== Abb–Abl ====
- Abba Aa Hudugi (1959)
- ABBA: The Movie (1977)
- Abbabba (2024)
- Abbai Class Ammai Mass (2013)
- Abbas Kiarostami: A Report (2013)
- Abbayigaru (1993)
- Abbayitho Ammayi (2016)
- Abbé Pierre – A Century of Devotion (2023)
- Abbiamo vinto! (1951)
- Abbott and Costello series:
  - Abbott and Costello in the Foreign Legion (1950)
  - Abbott and Costello Go to Mars (1953)
  - Abbott and Costello in Hollywood (1945)
  - Abbott and Costello Meet Captain Kidd (1952)
  - Abbott and Costello Meet Dr. Jekyll and Mr. Hyde (1953)
  - Abbott and Costello Meet Frankenstein (1948)
  - Abbott and Costello Meet the Invisible Man (1951)
  - Abbott and Costello Meet the Keystone Kops (1955)
  - Abbott and Costello Meet the Killer, Boris Karloff (1949)
  - Abbott and Costello Meet the Mummy (1955)
- Abby (1974)
- Abby, I Hardly Knew Ya (1995)
- Abby Singer (2003)
- Abby in Wonderland (2008)
- Abby's List (2022)
- ABCD (2005)
- ABCD: Any Body Can Dance (2013)
- ABCD 2 (2015)
- The ABCs of Death series:
  - The ABCs of Death (2012)
  - ABCs of Death 2 (2014)
  - ABC's of Death 2½ (2016)
- The Abdication (1974)
- Abdo & Saneya (2024)
- Abduct Me (1932)
- Abducted (1986)
- Abducted: The Carlina White Story (2012 TV)
- Abducted: The Mary Stauffer Story (2019 TV)
- Abducted in Plain Sight (2017)
- Abduction (1975)
- Abduction (2011)
- Abduction: The Megumi Yokota Story (2006)
- Abduction of the Wizard (1989)
- Abdul the Damned (1935)
- Abdulla (1960)
- Abdulla the Great (1955)
- Abdulla Oripov (2023)
- Abdullah (1980)
- Abe (2020)
- Abe & Bruno (2006)
- Abe Lincoln in Illinois (1940)
- Abe & Phil's Last Poker Game (2017)
- Abe-Hayat (1955)
- Abel: (1986 & 2010)
- Abel's Island (1988)
- Abeni (2007)
- Aberdeen: (2000, 2014 & 2024)
- Aberration (1997)
- Abeti Masikini: Le Combat d'Une Femme (2015)
- Abhay: (1994 & 2009)
- Abhaya (2017)
- Abhayam: (1970 & 1991)
- Abhayam Thedi (1986)
- Abhi: (2003 & 2024)
- Abhi To Jee Lein (1977)
- Abhi To Main Jawan Hoon (1989)
- Abhi Tou Main Jawan Hoon (2013 TV)
- Abhijaan (2022)
- Abhijan: (1962 & 1984)
- Abhilasha: (1968 & 1983)
- Abhilasham (2025)
- Abhimaan: (1973 & 2016)
- Abhimaanam (1975)
- Abhimanam (1960)
- Abhimani (2009)
- Abhimanyu: (1948, 1989, 1990, 1991, 1997, 2003, 2006 & 2014)
- Abhinandana (1988)
- Abhinandanam (1976)
- Abhinayam (1981)
- Abhinetri: (1970 & 2015)
- Abhinikmana (2013)
- Abhinivesham (1977)
- Abhinoy Noy (1983)
- Abhiramachandra (2023)
- Abhirami: (1992 & 2024)
- Abhikesham (1998)
- Abhiyum Anuvum (2018)
- Abhiyum Naanum (2008)
- Abhiyum Njanum (2013)
- Abi foq al-Shagara (1969)
- Abi and Rabi (1930)
- Abie's Irish Rose: (1928 & 1946)
- Abigail: (2019, 2023 & 2024)
- Abigail Leslie Is Back In Town (1974)
- Abilene (1999)
- Abilene Town (1946)
- Abilene Trail (1951)
- Ablations (2014)
- Ablaze (2001)

==== Abn–Abo ====
- Abner, the Invisible Dog (2013)
- Abnormal Family: Older Brother's Bride (1984)
- Abominable: (2006 & 2019)
- The Abominable Dr. Phibes (1971)
- The Abominable Snowman (1957)
- Abortion: Stories Women Tell (2016)
- Abouna (2002)
- About Adam (2000)
- About Alex (2014)
- About Baghdad (2003)
- About a Boy (2002)
- About Cherry (2012)
- About Dry Grasses (2023)
- About Elly (2009)
- About Endlessness (2019)
- About Everything There Is to Know (2021)
- About Face: (1942 & 1952)
- About Family (2024)
- About Fate (2022)
- About Fifty (2011)
- About a Girl: (2001 & 2014)
- About Her (2011 TV)
- About an Inquest (1931)
- About Joan (2022)
- Above the Lake (1995)
- About Last Night... (1986)
- About Last Night (2014)
- About the Little Red Riding Hood (1977 TV)
- About Love: (1970, 2005, 2015 & 2019)
- About Love. For Adults Only (2017)
- About Memory and Loss (2022)
- About Mrs. Leslie (1954)
- About My Father (2023)
- About an Old Man, an Old Woman and Their Hen Ryaba (1982)
- Above Rubies (1932)
- About Sara (2005)
- About Schmidt (2002)
- About Scout (2015)
- About Seven Brothers (1968)
- About Some Meaningless Events (1974)
- About the Son (1921)
- About Sunny (2011)
- About a Teacher (2020)
- About That Life (2019)
- About the Thunders (1946)
- About Time: (1962 & 2013)
- About Us (2016)
- About Us But Not About Us (2022)
- About Vitya, Masha, and Marines (1973)
- About a Wife, a Dream and Another... (2013)
- Above All Else in the World (1941)
- Above the Below (TBD)
- Above and Beyond: (1952 & 2014)
- Above the Clouds (1933)
- Above the Knee (2010)
- Above the Law (1988)
- Above the Law (2017)
- Above Majestic (2018)
- Above the Mountains (1992)
- Above the Rim (1994)
- Above the Shadows (2019)
- Above Suspicion: (1943, 1995 & 2019)
- Above Us Only Sky (2011)
- Above Us the Waves (1955)

==== Abr–Abz ====
- Abra Cadabra (1983)
- Abra-Catastrophe! (2003) (TV)
- Abracadabra (1952)
- Abracadabra (2017)
- Abracadabra (2019)
- The Abrafaxe – Under The Black Flag (2001)
- Abraham (1994)
- Abraham (2015)
- Abraham and Eugenia: Stories from Jewish Cuba (1994)
- Abraham Lincoln: (1924 feature, 1924 short & 1930)
- Abraham Lincoln: Vampire Hunter (2012)
- Abraham Lincoln vs. Zombies (2012)
- Abraham & Lincoln (2017)
- Abraham Lincoln's Clemency (1910)
- Abraham's Boys (2025)
- Abraham's Gold (1990)
- Abraham's Valley (1993)
- Abrahaminte Santhathikal (2018)
- Abraxas, Guardian of the Universe (1991)
- Abroad with Two Yanks (1944)
- Abruptio (2023)
- Absence (2014)
- Absence of Malice (1981)
- Absences (2013)
- Absent (1928)
- Absent (2011)
- The Absent-Minded Professor (1961)
- Absent Without Leave (1992)
- Absentia (2011)
- Absinthe: (1913 & 1914)
- Absolon (2003)
- Absolut Warhola (2001)
- Absolute 100 (2001)
- Absolute Beginners (1986)
- Absolute Deception (2013)
- Absolute Dominion (2025)
- Absolute Evil (2009)
- Absolute Giganten (1999)
- Absolute Hangover (1999)
- Absolute Power (1997)
- Absolute Proof (2021)
- Absolute Quiet (1936)
- Absolute Strangers (1991 TV)
- Absolutely Anything (2015)
- Absolutely Fabulous (2001)
- Absolutely Fabulous: The Movie (2016)
- Absolutely Secret: Girl Torture (1968)
- Absolutely Seriously (1961)
- Absolution: (1978, 2015 & 2024)
- Absurd (1981)
- Absurda (2007)
- Absurdistan (2008)
- Abu Zayd al-Hilali (1947)
- Abundance of Life (1950)
- Abundant Acreage Available (2017)
- Abuse of Power (1971)
- Abuse of Weakness (2013)
- Abwärts (1984)
- Aby (2017)
- The Abysmal Brute (1923)
- Abyss (2000)
- The Abyss (1910)
- The Abyss (1988)
- The Abyss (1989)
- The Abyss Boys (2009)
- The Abyss Opens (1945)
- The Abyss of Repentance (1923)
- Abyssal Spider (2020)
- Abzurdah (2015)

=== Ac ===
==== Aca–Acr ====
- ACAB – All Cops Are Bastards (2012)
- Acacia (2003)
- Academy: (1996 TV & 2007)
- The Academy Decides (1937)
- The Academy of Fine Arts (2025)
- The Academy of Magic (2020)
- The Academy of Muses (2015)
- Acadiana (2019)
- Acapulco (1952)
- Acapulco Gold (1976)
- Acasă, My Home (2020)
- Accattone (1961)
- Acceleration (2019)
- Acceptance (2009)
- Accepted (2006)
- Accidence (2018)
- Accident: (1928, 1967, 1976, 1985, 2008, 2009, 2012 & 2013)
- The Accident (1963)
- Accident 703 (1962)
- Accident on Hill Road (2009)
- Accident Man (2018)
- Accidental Death (1963)
- The Accidental Detective (2015)
- The Accidental Detective 2: In Action (2018)
- The Accidental Gangster and the Mistaken Courtesan (2008)
- The Accidental Getaway Driver (2023)
- Accidental Hero (1992)
- The Accidental Honeymoon (1918)
- The Accidental Husband (2008)
- The Accidental Prime Minister (2019)
- The Accidental Spy (2001)
- The Accidental Spy (2017)
- Accidental Texan (2023)
- The Accidental Tourist (1988)
- Accidents Happen (2009)
- Accidents to the Taxes!! (1951)
- Accidents Will Happen (1938)
- The Accompanist (1992)
- The Accompanist (2026)
- Accomplice (1946)
- The Accomplice (1917)
- The Accomplice (1932)
- Accomplices (2009)
- The Accountant: (2001 & 2016)
- The Accountant 2 (2025)
- The Accountant of Auschwitz (2018)
- Accumulator 1 (1994)
- The Accusation (1950)
- The Accusation (2021)
- Accused: (1936, 1964, 2005 & 2014)
- The Accused (1949)
- The Accused (1960)
- The Accused (1988)
- The Accused (2018)
- Accused of Murder (1956)
- The Accused Uncle Shangang (1994)
- The Accuser (1977)
- The Accusing Finger (1936)
- The Accusing Hand (1913)
- The Accusing Song (1936)
- The Accusing Toe (1918)
- The Ace of Cads (1926)
- Ace Drummond (1936)
- The Ace of Hearts (1921)
- Ace High: (1918, 1919 & 1968)
- Ace in the Hole: (1942 & 1951)
- The Ace of Scotland Yard (1929)
- The Ace of Spades (1925)
- The Ace of Spades (1935)
- Ace Ventura series:
  - Ace Ventura: Pet Detective (1994)
  - Ace Ventura: When Nature Calls (1995)
  - Ace Ventura Jr.: Pet Detective (2009)
- Aces Go Places series:
  - Aces Go Places (1982)
  - Aces Go Places 2 (1983)
  - Aces Go Places 3 (1984)
  - Aces Go Places 4 (1986)
  - Aces Go Places 5: The Terracotta Hit (1989)
  - 97 Aces Go Places (1997)
- Aces High (1976)
- Aces: Iron Eagle III (1992)
- Achan: (1952 & 2011)
- Acharya (2022)
- Achut Kanya (1936)
- The Achy Breaky Hearts (2016)
- The Acid House (1998)
- The Acquittal (1923)
- Acquitted for Having Committed the Deed (1992)
- Acrimony (2018)
- The Acrobat (1941)
- The Acrobat (2019)
- The Acrobats (1997)
- The Acrobatic Fly (1910)
- Across 110th Street (1972)
- Across the Bridge (1957)
- Across the Pacific (1942)
- Across the River and Into the Trees (2022)
- Across the Tracks (1991)
- Across the Universe (2007)
- Across the Wide Missouri (1951)

==== Act–Acu ====
- Act of Aggression (1975)
- An Act of Conscience (1997)
- Act of God (2009)
- The Act of the Heart (1970)
- The Act of Killing (2012)
- Act of Love: (1953 & 1980)
- Act of Memory (2012)
- Act of Murder (1964)
- An Act of Murder (1948)
- Act of Necessity (1991 TV)
- Act Normal (2006)
- Act One (1963)
- The Act in Question (1994)
- Act of Piracy (1988)
- An Act of Reprisal (1964)
- The Act of Seeing with One's Own Eyes (1971)
- Act of Valor (2012)
- An Act of Valour (2010)
- Act of Vengeance (1986)
- Act of Violence: (1949, 1956, & 1959)
- An Act of War (2015)
- Acteón (1965)
- The Acting Class (2000)
- Action: (1921, 1980 & 2019)
- Action 3D (2013)
- Action at Anguar (1945)
- Action in Arabia (1944)
- Action Boys (2008)
- An Action Hero (2022)
- Action Hero Biju (2016)
- Action Jackson: (1988 & 2014)
- Action Man (1967)
- Action Man: Robot Atak (2004)
- Action, Manya! (1991)
- Action No. 1 (2002)
- Action in the North Atlantic (1943)
- Action: The October Crisis of 1970 (1973)
- Action Point (2018)
- Action Replayy (2010)
- Action for Slander (1937)
- Action in Slow Motion (1943)
- Action Stations (1959)
- Action of the Tiger (1957)
- Action U.S.A. (1989)
- The Activated Man (2023)
- Active Measures (2018)
- Active Stealth (1999)
- The Activist (1969)
- Actor (2016)
- The Actor: (1990, 1993 & 2025)
- Actor Martinez (2016)
- An Actor Prepares (2018)
- The Actor and the Rube (1915)
- The Actor and the Savages (1975)
- The Actor Who Disappeared (1941)
- The Actor's Children (1910)
- An Actor's Revenge (1963)
- Actor's and Sin (1952)
- Actors: (2000 & 2021)
- The Actors (2003)
- Actors Anonymous (2017)
- Actress: (1943, 2007 & 2014)
- An Actress (1956)
- The Actress: (1928 & 1953)
- Actresses (2009)
- Actrices (2007)
- Actrius (1997)
- Acts of Love (2021)
- Acts of Vengeance (2017)
- Acts of Violence (2018)
- Acts of Worship (2001)
- Actually (2014)
- Acute Misfortune (2018)
- Acuérdate de mí (2022)

=== Ad ===
- Ad Astra (2019)
- Ad Fundum (1993)
- Ad-lib Night (2006)

==== Ada ====
- Ada: (1961 & 2019)
- Ada... A Way of Life (2010)
- Ada Apa Dengan Cinta? (2002)
- Ada Apa Dengan Cinta? 2 (2016)
- Ada Apa Dengan Rina (2013)
- Adada (1987)
- Adada Enna Azhagu (2009)
- Adagio (2000)
- Adagio (2023)
- Adalat: (1958 & 1976)
- Adalat o Ekti Meye (1981)
- Adalu Badalu (1979)
- Adalynn (2023)
- Adam: (1983 TV, 1992, 2009, 2019 American, 2019 Moroccan & 2020)
- Adam at 6 A.M. (1970)
- Adam Bede (1918)
- Adam and the Devil (2007)
- Adam and Dog (2011)
- Adam & Eva (1997)
- Adam and Eve: (1923, 1928, 1949, 1953 & 1969)
- Adam and Evelyne (1949)
- Adam and Evil: (1927 & 2004)
- Adam & Paul (2004)
- The Adam Project (2022)
- Adam and the Serpent (1946)
- Adam & Steve (2005)
- Adam, Eve and Datsa (2011)
- Adam's Apple (1928)
- Adam's Apples (2005)
- Adam's Rib: (1923, 1949 & 1990)
- Adam's Testament (2017)
- Adam's Tree (1936)
- Adam's Wall (2008)
- Adam's Woman (1970)
- Adama (2015)
- Adaminte Makan Abu (2011)
- Adaminte Vaariyellu (1984)
- Adanga Maru (2018)
- Adanggaman (2000)
- Adaptation. (2002)
- Adaraneeya Kathawak (2016)
- Adarawanthayo (1968)
- Adaraye Namayen (2008)
- Adarei Man (2018)

==== Adb–Adu ====
- Adbhut (2024)
- Adbhutham (2021)
- Adda: (2013 & 2019)
- The Addams Family series:
  - The Addams Family: (1991 & 2019)
  - The Addams Family 2 (2021)
  - Addams Family Reunion (1998)
  - Addams Family Values (1993)
- The Adderall Diaries (2015)
- Addicted: (2002 & 2008)
- Addicted to Fresno (2015)
- Addicted to Love (1997)
- The Addiction (1995)
- Addiction (2004)
- Addio Alexandra (1969)
- Addio, figlio mio! (1953)
- Addio fottuti musi verdi (2017)
- Address Na (2015)
- Address Unknown: (1935, 1944 & 2001)
- Adela: (2000 & 2008)
- Adele (1919)
- Adelheid (1970)
- Adha Din Aadhi Raat (1977)
- Adharm (1992)
- Adharmam (1994)
- Adharvam (1989)
- Adhe Kangal (2017)
- Adhe Neram Adhe Idam (2009)
- Adhibar (2015)
- Adhikar: (1939, 1954, 1971 & 1986)
- Adhikaram (1980)
- Adhikari (1991)
- Adhinayak (2006)
- Adhinayakudu (2012)
- Adhineta (2009)
- Adhipan (1989)
- Adhipathi (2001)
- Adhisaya Manithan (1990)
- Adhisaya Ulagam (2012)
- Adhisayappiravigal (1982)
- Adhithan Kanavu (1948)
- Adhiar (2003)
- Adho Andha Paravai Pola (TBD)
- Adholokam (1988)
- Adhu (2004)
- Adhu Antha Kaalam (1988)
- Adhu Oru Kana Kaalam (2005)
- Adhugo (2018)
- Adhuri Kahani (1939)
- Adhurs (2010)
- Adhwaytham (1992)
- Adhyan (2015)
- Adhyapika (1968)
- Adhyarathri (2019)
- Adhyayam Onnu Muthal (1985)
- Adi Shankaracharya (1983)
- Adieu l'ami (1968)
- Adikkurippu (1989)
- Adima Changala (1981)
- Adimadhyantham (2011)
- Adimai Changili (1997)
- Adimai Penn (1969)
- Adimakal (1969)
- Adimakal Udamakal (1987)
- Adimakkachavadam (1978)
- Adios Amigos (2016)
- Adiós, Sabata (1971)
- Adipurush (2023)
- Adirindi Alludu (1996)
- Adithya Varma (2019)
- Adiyozhukkukal (1984)
- Adiyum Andamum (2014)
- Adjust Your Tracking (2013)
- The Adjuster (1991)
- The Adjustment Bureau (2011)
- The Admirable Crichton: (1918, 1957 & 1968 TV)
- Admiral (2008)
- Admiral Nakhimov (1947)
- Admiral Ushakov (1953)
- Admission (2013)
- Admission by Guts (2015)
- The Adolescent (1979)
- Adopt a Highway (2019)
- Adoption (1975)
- Adoration: (1928, 2008, 2013 & 2019)
- Adore (2013)
- Adrenaline Rush (2002)
- Adrift: (1911, 2009 Brazilian, 2009 Vietnamese, 2018)
- Adrift in Tokyo (2007)
- Adultery: (1945 & 1989)
- Adultery Italian Style (1966)
- Adutha Varisu (1995)

==== Adv ====
- Advaitha (2013)
- Advantage (1977)
- Advantages of Travelling by Train (2019)
- Advent (2016)
- The Advent Calendar (2021)
- Adventure: (1925, 1936, 1946 & 2011)
- An Adventure in the Autumn Woods (1913)
- The Adventure of a Ball Night (1918)
- Adventure in Baltimore (1949)
- Adventure in the Bronx (1941)
- The Adventure of Cabassou (1946)
- The Adventure Club (2016)
- Adventure in Diamonds (1940)
- The Adventure of Doctor Kircheisen (1921)
- The Adventure of Faustus Bidgood (1986)
- Adventure in Gerolstein (1957)
- Adventure Girl (1934)
- An Adventure in Hearts (1919)
- Adventure in the Hopfields (1954)
- Adventure in Iraq (1943)
- The Adventure of Iron Pussy (2003)
- Adventure Island (1947)
- The Adventure of the Italian Model (1912)
- Adventure of the King (2010)
- Adventure in Love (1938)
- Adventure in Manhattan (1936)
- An Adventure on the Mexican Border (1913)
- Adventure in Morocco (1953)
- The Adventure of Mr. Philip Collins (1925)
- Adventure in Music (1944)
- Adventure in the Night (1948)
- Adventure on the Night Express (1925)
- Adventure in Odessa (1953)
- Adventure in Paradise (1970)
- Adventure in Paris (1936)
- Adventure in Pyjamas (1935)
- Adventure in Sahara (1938)
- An Adventure of Salvator Rosa (1939)
- The Adventure of Sherlock Holmes' Smarter Brother (1975)
- The Adventure Shop (1919)
- Adventure on the Southern Express (1934)
- An Adventure in Space and Time (2013) (TV)
- The Adventure of Sudsakorn (1979)
- Adventure of Sundarbans (2023)
- An Adventure for Two (1979)
- Adventure in Vienna (1952)
- Adventure in Warsaw (1938)
- Adventure in Washington (1941)
- The Adventure of the Wrong Santa Claus (1914)
- The Adventure of the Yellow Curl Papers (1915)
- Adventureland (2009)
- Adventurer (1942)
- The Adventurer (1917)
- The Adventurer (1920)
- The Adventurer (1922)
- The Adventurer (1928)
- The Adventurer (1934)
- The Adventurer of Chad (1953)
- The Adventurer: The Curse of the Midas Box (2014)
- The Adventurer of Paris (1936)
- The Adventurer of Tortuga (1964)
- The Adventurer of Tunis (1931)
- The Adventurers (1926)
- The Adventurers (1951)
- The Adventurers (1970)
- The Adventurers (1995)
- The Adventurers (2014)
- The Adventurers (2017)
- The Adventurers of the Air (1950)
- Adventures of Aladdin (1978)
- The Adventures of Algy (1925)
- Adventures of Ali-Baba and the Forty Thieves (1980)
- The Adventures of André & Wally B. (1984)
- The Adventures of Antar and Abla (1948)
- The Adventures of Anton (1913)
- Adventures in Appletown (2008)
- The Adventures of Arsène Lupin (1957)
- Adventures in Babysitting: (1987 & 2016 TV)
- The Adventures of Baron Munchausen (1988)
- The Adventures of Barry McKenzie (1972)
- The Adventures of Billy (1911)
- The Adventures of Brer Rabbit (2006)
- The Adventures of Buckaroo Banzai Across the 8th Dimension (1984)
- The Adventures of Bullwhip Griffin (1967)
- The Adventures of Buratino (1959)
- The Adventures of Buratino (1975)
- Adventures of Captain Fabian (1951)
- The Adventures of Captain Hansen (1917)
- The Adventures of Captain Hasswell (1925)
- Adventures of Captain Marvel (1941)
- The Adventures of Captain Zoom in Outer Space (1995) (TV)
- Adventures of Casanova (1948)
- The Adventures of Casanova (1947)
- Adventures in a City that does not Exist (1974)
- The Adventures of Count Bobby (1961)
- Adventures of a Dentist (1965)
- Adventures in Dinosaur City (1991)
- The Adventures of Dollie (1908)
- The Adventures of Don Coyote (1947)
- Adventures of Don Juan (1948)
- The Adventures of Elmo in Grouchland (1999)
- Adventures in the Engadin (1932)
- The Adventures of Food Boy (2008)
- The Adventures of Ford Fairlane (1990)
- The Adventures of Fra Diavolo (1942)
- The Adventures of Fridolin (1948)
- The Adventures of Frontier Fremont (1976)
- The Adventures of Gerard (1970)
- The Adventures of Gil Blas (1956)
- The Adventures of God (2000)
- The Adventures of Greyfriars Bobby (2005)
- The Adventures of Hajji Baba (1954)
- The Adventures of Hal 5 (1958)
- The Adventures of Hercules (1985)
- The Adventures of Huck Finn (1993)
- The Adventures of Huckleberry Finn: (1939 & 1960)
- The Adventures of Ichabod and Mr. Toad (1949)
- Adventures Italian Style (2020)
- The Adventures of Jane (1949)
- The Adventures of Jane Arden (1939)
- The Adventures of Jimmy (1950)
- The Adventures of Jinbao (2012)
- The Adventures of Juan Quin Quin (1967)
- Adventures of Juku the Dog (1931)
- The Adventures of Kathlyn (1913)
- The Adventures of Lucky Pierre (1961)
- The Adventures of Mandrin (1952)
- The Adventures of Marco Polo (1938)
- The Adventures of Mark Twain (1944)
- The Adventures of Mark Twain (1985)
- The Adventures of Martin Eden (1942)
- The Adventures of Mary-Kate & Ashley series:
  - The Adventures of Mary-Kate & Ashley: The Case of the Christmas Caper (1995)
  - The Adventures of Mary-Kate & Ashley: The Case of the Fun House Mystery (1995)
  - The Adventures of Mary-Kate & Ashley: The Case of the Hotel Who-Done-It (1996)
  - The Adventures of Mary-Kate & Ashley: The Case of the Logical i Ranch (1994)
  - The Adventures of Mary-Kate & Ashley: The Case of the Mystery Cruise (1995)
  - The Adventures of Mary-Kate & Ashley: The Case of the SeaWorld Adventure (1995)
  - The Adventures of Mary-Kate & Ashley: The Case of the Shark Encounter (1996)
  - The Adventures of Mary-Kate & Ashley: The Case of Thorn Mansion (1994)
  - The Adventures of Mary-Kate & Ashley: The Case of the U.S. Space Camp Mission (1996)
  - The Adventures of Mary-Kate & Ashley: The Case of the United States Navy Adventure (1997)
  - The Adventures of Mary-Kate & Ashley: The Case of the Volcano Mystery (1997)
- The Adventures of Milo and Otis (1989)
- The Adventures of Monica and Friends (1982)
- The Adventures of Mr. Pickwick (1921)
- The Adventures of Nellie Bly (1981) (TV)
- The Adventures of Nick Carter (1972) (TV)
- Adventures of Nils Holgersson (1962)
- The Adventures of Ociee Nash (2003)
- The Adventures of Oktyabrina (1924)
- Adventures of Omanakuttan (2017)
- The Adventures of Paper Peter (1990)
- The Adventures of PC 49 (1949)
- The Adventures of Peg o' the Ring (1916)
- Adventures of the Penguin King (2013)
- Adventures in Perception (1971)
- Adventures of Petrov and Vasechkin, Usual and Incredible (1983)
- The Adventures of Picasso (1978)
- The Adventures of Pinocchio (1911, 1972, 1996 & unreleased)
- Adventures of a Plumber's Mate (1978)
- The Adventures of Pluto Nash (2002)
- Adventures of Power (2008)
- The Adventures of Prince Achmed (1926)
- The Adventures of Priscilla, Queen of the Desert (1994)
- Adventures of a Private Eye (1977)
- Adventures in Public School (2017)
- The Adventures of Pureza: Queen of the Riles (2011)
- The Adventures of Quentin Durward (1955)
- The Adventures of Quentin Durward, Marksman of the Royal Guard (1988)
- Adventures of the Queen (1975 TV)
- Adventures of Red Ryder (1940)
- The Adventures of Rex and Rinty (1935)
- The Adventures of Robert Macaire (1925)
- The Adventures of Robin Hood (1938)
- Adventures of Robinson Crusoe, a Sailor from York (1982)
- The Adventures of Rocky and Bullwinkle (2000)
- Adventures of Rusty (1945)
- Adventures of Serial Buddies (2011)
- The Adventures of Sharkboy and Lavagirl in 3-D (2005)
- The Adventures of Sherlock Holmes (1939)
- Adventures of Sherlock Holmes; or, Held for Ransom (1905)
- Adventures in Silverado (1948)
- Adventures in the Sin Bin (2012)
- The Adventures of Sinbad 2 (2014)
- Adventures of Sinbad the Sailor (1974)
- Adventures of Sir Galahad (1949)
- Adventures of Tarzan (1985)
- Adventures of a Taxi Driver (1976)
- The Adventures of Tintin (2011)
- The Adventures of Tom Sawyer (1938)
- The Adventures of Tom Thumb and Thumbelina (2002)
- The Adventures of a Two-Minute Werewolf (1985)
- Adventures in Wild California (2000)
- The Adventures of the Wilderness Family (1975)
- Adventures of William Tell (1898)
- Adventures of the Yellow Suitcase (1970)
- Adventures in Zambezia (2012)
- An Adventurous Automobile Trip (1904)
- Advise & Consent (1962)

==== Adw–Ady ====
- Adwa (1999)
- Adyaksha in America (2019)

=== Ae ===
- Ae (2022)
- Ae Dil Hai Mushkil (2016)
- Ae Fond Kiss... (2004)
- Ae Jugara Krushna Sudama (2003)
- Ae Kaash Ke Hum (2020)
- Ae Watan Mere Watan (2024)
- Aedan (2018)
- Aeeye (1949)
- Aegri Somnia (2008)
- Aelita (1924)
- Aelita, Do Not Pester Men! (1988)
- Aenigma (1987)
- Aera! Aera! Aera! (1972)
- Aerial Anarchists (1911)
- Aerial Gunner (1943)
- An Aerial Joy Ride (1917)
- An Aerial Joyride (1916)
- Aerials (2016)
- Aerograd (1935)
- The Aeronauts (2019)
- Aesop's Fables (1921–1934)
- Aetbaar (2004)
- Aethiree (2004)
- Æon Flux (2005)

=== Af ===
==== Afe ====
- Aferim! (2015)

==== Aff ====
- An Affair (1998)
- An Affair to Die For (2019)
- An Affair of the Follies (1927)
- Affair in Havana (1957)
- The Affair of the Necklace (2001)
- An Affair to Remember (1957)
- Affair in Reno (1957)
- An Affair of the Skin (1963)
- Affair in the Snow (1968)
- Affair with a Stranger (1953)
- The Affair of Susan (1935)
- An Affair of Three Nations (1915)
- Affair in Trinidad (1952)
- The Affairs of Anatol (1921)
- The Affairs of Annabel (1938)
- Affairs of the Art (2021)
- Affairs of Cappy Ricks (1937)
- The Affairs of Cellini (1934)
- The Affairs of Dobie Gillis (1953)
- Affairs of a Gentleman (1934)
- Affairs of Geraldine (1946)
- Affairs of the Heart (2017)
- The Affairs of Jimmy Valentine (1942)
- The Affairs of Martha (1942)
- Affairs of State (2018)
- The Affairs of Susan (1945)
- Affinity (2008)
- Afflicted (2013)
- The Afflicted (2011)
- Affliction: (1996 & 1997)
- Affluenza (2014)

==== Afg–Afw ====
- Afghan Breakdown (1990)
- Afghan Luke (2011)
- Afghan Muscles (2006)
- Afghan Star (2009)
- Afinidades (2010)
- Aflame in the Sky (1927)
- Aflatoon: (1997 & 2023)
- Afraid (2024)
- Afraid of Nothing, the Jobless King (1999)
- Afraid to Die (1960)
- Afraid to Fight (1922)
- Afraid to Love (1927)
- Afraid to Talk (1932)
- Africa: (1930, 2011 & 2019)
- África (1996)
- Africa Addio (1966)
- Africa Adventure (1954)
- Africa Before Dark (1928)
- Africa Express (1975)
- Africa Is a Woman's Name (2010)
- Africa: Open for Business (2005)
- Africa Screams (1949)
- Africa: The Serengeti (1994)
- Africa Speaks! (1930)
- Africa Squeaks (1940)
- Africa Texas Style (1967)
- Africa United: (2005 & 2010)
- African Cats (2011)
- The African Doctor (2016)
- African Jim (1949)
- The African Lion (1955)
- African Moot (2022)
- The African Queen (1951)
- African Violet (2019)
- Africano (2001)
- Afsana Pyar Ka (1991)
- After: (2009, 2012 & 2019)
- After All (2006)
- After All It's Only Life (1993)
- After the Apocalypse (2004)
- After the Ball: (1897, 1914, 1924, 1932, 1957 & 2015)
- After Blue (2021)
- After Dark, My Sweet (1990)
- After Death (1988)
- After Dusk They Come (2009)
- After Earth (2013)
- After Everything (2018)
- After the Fox (1966)
- After Hours (1985)
- After the Hunt (2025)
- After Jimmy (1996)
- After Life (1998)
- After Midnight: (1927, 1989, 2004, 2014 & 2019)
- After Office Hours (1935)
- After the Rain (1999)
- After the Rehearsal (1984 TV)
- After School: (1972 & 2003)
- After the Show (1921)
- After Stonewall (1999)
- After the Storm: (1915, 1928, 1948, 2001 & 2016)
- After Sundown: (1911 & 2006)
- After the Sunset (2004)
- After the Thin Man (1936)
- After Tonight (1933)
- After We Collided (2020)
- After We Fell (2021)
- After the Wedding: (1962, 2006 & 2019)
- After Yang (2021)
- After.Life (2009)
- Afterburn: (1992 & 2025)
- Afterglow (1997)
- Afterimage (2016)
- AfterLife (2003)
- Aftermath: (1990, 1994, 2004, 2012, 2014 & 2017)
- The Aftermath: (1982 & 2019)
- Aftermath: The Remnants of War (2001)
- Afterschool (2008)
- Aftershock (2010 & 2012)
- Aftersun (2022)
- Afua's Diary (2015)
- Afuang: Bounty Hunter (1988)
- Afwaah (2023)

=== Ag ===
==== Aga ====
- Aga Bai Arechyaa 2 (2015)
- Aga Bai Arrecha! (2004)
- Agadez, the Music and the Rebellion (2010)
- Agadu (2021)
- Again (2015)
- Again Kasargod Khader Bhai (2010)
- Again Pioneers (1950)
- Against All (1956)
- Against All Flags (1952)
- Against All Odds: (1924, 1984 & 2011)
- Against the Clock (2019)
- Against a Crooked Sky (1975)
- Against the Current (2009)
- Against the Dark (2009)
- Against the Dying of the Light (2001)
- Against the Grain: More Meat Than Wheat (1981)
- Against the Ice (2022)
- Against the Law: (1934, 1950 & 1997)
- Against the Night (2017)
- Against the Ropes (2004)
- Against the Sun (2014)
- Against the Tide: (1937 & 2023)
- Against the Wall: (1994 TV & 2010)
- Against the Wild (2013)
- Against the Wind (1948)
- Against Wind and Tide: A Cuban Odyssey (1981) (TV)
- Agak Laen (2024)
- Agal Vilakku (1979)
- Agam Puram (2010)
- Agantuk (1991)
- Agapito (2025)
- Agar... If (1977)
- Agar Tum Na Hote (1983)
- Agaram (2007)
- Agatha (1979)
- Agatha and the Curse of Ishtar (2019 TV)
- Agatha and the Midnight Murders (2020 TV)
- Agatha Raisin and the Quiche of Death (2014 TV)
- Agatha, Stop That Murdering! (1960)
- Agatha and the Truth of Murder (2018)
- Agatha's Almanac (2025)
- Agathiyar (1972)
- Agaya Gangai (1982)
- Agazat Gharam (1967)

==== Age ====
- Age 7 in America (1991)
- Age 13 (1955)
- Age 17 (2013)
- The Age of Adaline (2015)
- Age of Cannibals (2014)
- Age of Consent (1969)
- The Age of Consent (1932)
- L'Âge d'Or (1930)
- Age of Dinosaurs (2013)
- Age of the Dragons (2011)
- Age of Heroes (2011)
- Age of Illusions (1965)
- Age of Indiscretion (1935)
- Age of Innocence (1977)
- The Age of Innocence: (1924, 1934 & 1993)
- The Age of Insects (1990)
- Age Isn't Everything (1991)
- Age Jodi Jantam Tui Hobi Por (2014)
- Age of Kill (2015)
- The Age of Love: (1954 & 2014)
- Age Out (2018)
- Age of Panic (2013)
- The Age of Pioneers (2017)
- The Age of Shadows (2016)
- Age of Success (1988)
- Age of Uprising: The Legend of Michael Kohlhaas (2013)
- Agee (1980)
- Agency (1981)
- Agent (2023)
- Agent 009 (1980)
- Agent 3S3: Massacre in the Sun (1966)
- Agent 3S3: Passport to Hell (1965)
- Agent 505: Death Trap in Beirut (1966)
- Agent Backkom: Kings Bear (2021)
- Agent Carter (2013)
- Agent Cody Banks (2003)
- Agent Cody Banks 2: Destination London (2004)
- Agent F.O.X. (2015)
- Agent Game (2022)
- Agent of Happiness (2024)
- Agent for H.A.R.M. (1966)
- Agent J (2007)
- Agent Kannayiram (2022)
- Agent Orange (2004)
- Agent Recon (2024)
- Agent Red (2000)
- Agent Sai Srinivasa Athreya (2019)
- Agent Vinod: (1977 & 2012)
- Agent Wild Duck (2002)
- Agent X44 (2007)
- Agent X-77 Orders to Kill (1966)
- Agente Segreto 070: Thunderbay Missione Grasshopper (1966)
- Agente X 1-7 operazione Oceano (1965)
- The Ages of Lulu (1990)

==== Agg–Agy ====
- Aggar (2007)
- Aggie (2020)
- Aggie Appleby, Maker of Men (1933)
- Aggiramudu (1990)
- The Aggressives: (2005 American & 2005 South Korean)
- AGGRO DR1FT (2023)
- Aghaat (1985)
- Aghathiyaa (2025)
- Aghet – Ein Völkermord (2010)
- Aghla Min Hayati (1965)
- Aghori (2023)
- Agila ng Maynila (1988)
- Agilan (2023)
- Agitated Women (1927)
- Agitator (2001)
- Agnee (1988)
- Agnee (2014)
- Agnee series:
  - Agnee (2014)
  - Agnee 2 (2015)
- Agnee Morcha (1997)
- Agneekaal (1990)
- Agneepath: (1990 & 2012)
- Agnes (1995)
- Agnes (2021)
- Agnes Arnau and Her Three Suitors (1918)
- Agnes Browne (1999)
- Agnes Cecilia – en sällsam historia (1991)
- Agnes of God (1985)
- Agnes and His Brothers (2004)
- Agnes Martin: Between the Lines (2016)
- Agnès Varda (2020)
- Agni: (1978, 1989, 2004 & 2024)
- Agni Devi (2019)
- Agni Gundam (1984)
- Agni IPS (1997)
- Agni Kshethram (1980)
- Agni Muhurtham (1987)
- Agni Natchathiram (1988)
- Agni Paarvai (1992)
- Agni Pareeksha: (1968 & 1981)
- Agni Pariksha (1954)
- Agni Parvatam (1985)
- Agni Poolu (1981)
- Agni Prem (1996)
- Agni Pushpam (1976)
- Agni Putrudu (1987)
- Agni Rekha (1973)
- Agni Sakshi: (1982 & 1996)
- Agni Shikha (1999)
- Agniparvatham (1979)
- Agnisakshi (1999)
- Agnosia (2010)
- Agnyaathavaasi (2018)
- Agnyathavasi (2025)
- Agon (2012)
- Agon (2025)
- Agonia (1969)
- Agony: (1981 & 2020)
- Agony of Christ (2009)
- The Agony and the Ecstasy (1965)
- Agora (2009)
- Agostino (1962)
- Agosto (1987)
- Agra: (2007 & 2023)
- Agra Road (1957)
- Agraharathil Kazhutai (1977)
- Agraja (2014)
- Agrajan (1995)
- Agram, die Hauptstadt Kroatiens (1948)
- Agreed Not to Separate (1999)
- Agreement (1980)
- Agrippina (1911)
- Agua (2006)
- Agueda Martinez: Our People, Our Country (1977)
- Aguila (1980)
- Águila o sol (1937)
- Aguirre, the Wrath of God (1972)
- Agujeros en el cielo (2004)
- Agustina of Aragon: (1929 & 1950)
- Agyaat (2009)

=== Ah ===
- Ah! La Barbe (1905)
- Ah! Les belles bacchantes (1954)
- Ah Boys to Men series:
  - Ah Boys to Men (2012)
  - Ah Boys to Men 2 (2013)
  - Ah Boys to Men 3: Frogmen (2015)
  - Ah Boys to Men 4 (2017)
- Ah Girls Go Army (2022)
- Ah! Kai na 'moun antras (1966)
- Ah! My Goddess: The Movie (2000)
- Ah, Wilderness! (1935)
- Aha! (2007)
- Aha Naa Pellanta! (2011)
- Aha! Naa Pellanta!! (1987)
- Ahaa Re (2019)
- Ahaan (2019)
- Ahalya: (1978 & 2015)
- Aham (1992)
- Aham Premasmi (2005)
- Aham Reboot (2024)
- Ahangaaram (1983)
- Ahankaar (1995)
- Ahare Mon (2018)
- Ahasin Wetei (2009)
- Ahead of the Curve (2020)
- Ahed's Knee (2021)
- Ahimsa: (1981 & 2023)
- Ahimsa: Stop to Run (2005)
- Ahinsa (1979)
- Ahista Ahista: (1981 & 2016)
- Ahingsa-Jikko mee gam (2005)
- Ahir Bhairav (2007)
- Ahí está el detalle (1940)
- Ahora o nunca (2015)

=== Ai–Ak ===
- Ai City (1986)
- Ai Weiwei: The Fake Case (2013)
- Ai Weiwei: Never Sorry (2012)
- Ai Weiwei: Yours Truly (2019)
- Ai-Fak (2004)
- Aida (1911)
- Aida (1953)
- Aida (1987)
- Aida (2015)
- Aida, I Saw Your Dad Last Night (2004)
- Aida, the Movie (2026)
- Aida of the Trees (2001)
- Aidan Walsh: Master of the Universe (2000)
- Aidankaatajat eli heidän jälkeensä vedenpaisumus (1982)
- Aikatsu! The Movie (2014)
- Aikatsu! Music Award: Minna de Shō o MoraimaSHOW! (2015)
- Aileen Wuornos: The Selling of a Serial Killer (1992)
- Aileen: Life and Death of a Serial Killer (2003)
- Aimée & Jaguar (1999)
- Ain't Them Bodies Saints (2013)
- Aina: (1977 & 2013)
- Ainbo: Spirit of the Amazon (2021)
- Air America (1990)
- Air Bud series:
  - Air Bud (1997)
  - Air Bud Spikes Back (2003)
  - Air Buddies (2006)
  - Air Bud: Golden Receiver (1998)
  - Air Bud: Seventh Inning Fetch (2002)
  - Air Bud: Spikes Back (2003)
  - Air Bud: World Pup (2000)
- Air Force (1943)
- Air Force One (1997)
- Air Force One Down (2024)
- The Air I Breathe (2007)
- Air Raid Wardens (1943)
- The Air Up There (1994)
- Airborne (1962)
- Airborne (1993)
- Airheads (1994)
- Airlift (2016)
- Airplane! (1980)
- Airplane II: The Sequel (1982)
- Airport (1993)
- Airport series:
  - Airport (1970)
  - Airport 1975 (1974)
  - Airport '77 (1977)
  - The Concorde... Airport '79 (1979)
- Airspeed (1998)
- The Airzone Solution (1993)
- Aisha (2010)
- Aitraaz (2004)
- Ajab Gazabb Love (2012)
- Ajab Prem Ki Ghazab Kahani (2009)
- Ajay: (1996 & 2006)
- Ajnabee: (1974 & 2001)
- Ajooba (1991)
- Ajooba Kudrat Ka (1991)
- AKA (2002)
- Akasha Gopuram (2006)
- Akayla (1991)
- Akbar-Jodha (2007)
- Akele Hum Akele Tum (1995)
- Akira: (1988, 2016 Hindi, 2016 Kannada)
- Akkada Abbai Ikkada Ammayi (1996)
- Akkare Akkare Akkare (1990)
- Akhiyon Se Goli Maare (2002)
- Akrobatisches Potpourri (1895)
- Akropol (1995)
- Aks: (2001 & 2018)
- Aksar (2006)

=== Al ===
- Al Davis vs. the NFL (2021)
- Al Franken: God Spoke (2006)
- Al Haram (1965)
- Al-Kompars (1993)
- Al-Lail (1992)

==== Ala–Alk ====
- Ala-Arriba! (1942)
- Aladdin (Golden Films, 1992)
- Aladdin and His Wonderful Lamp (1939)
- Aladdin series:
  - Aladdin: (1992 & 2019)
  - Aladdin and the King of Thieves (1996)
- Alag (2006)
- Alai (2003)
- Alai Payuthey (2000)
- Alam Ara (1931)
- Alambrado (1991)
- Alambrista! (1977)
- The Alamo: (1936, 1960 & 2004)
- The Alamo: 13 Days to Glory (1987 TV)
- Alan and Naomi (1992)
- An Alan Smithee Film: Burn Hollywood Burn (1998)
- Alarm Bells (1949)
- The Alarmist (1997)
- Alarum (2025)
- Alas de Mariposa (1991)
- Alaska: (1944, 1996)
- Alaska: Spirit of the Wild (1997)
- Alatriste (2006)
- Albela: (1951, 1971 & 2001)
- Albert (2016)
- Albert Nobbs (2011)
- Albert RN (1953)
- Albino Alligator (1996)
- The Alchemist Cookbook (2016)
- Alegre Ma Non Troppo (1994)
- Aletta Jacobs: Het Hoogste Streven (1995)
- Alex Cross (2012)
- Alex and Emma (2003)
- Alexander: (1996, 2004 & 2008)
- Alexander the Great: (1956 & 2010)
- Alexander the Last (2009)
- Alexander Nevsky (1938)
- Alexander Popov (1949)
- Alexander and the Terrible, Horrible, No Good, Very Bad Day (2014)
- Alexander and the Terrible, Horrible, No Good, Very Bad Road Trip (2025)
- Alexander's Ragtime Band (1938)
- Alexandra's Project (2003)
- Alexandria (2005)
- Alfalfa's Aunt (1939)
- Alfie: (1966 & 2004)
- Alfie Darling (1975)
- Alfonsina (1957)
- Algiers (1938)
- Algol: Tragedy of Power (1920)
- Ali (2001)
- Ali Baba Bujang Lapok (1960)
- Ali Baba and the Forty Thieves (1934)
- Ali Baba Goes to Town (1937)
- Ali G Indahouse (2002)
- Ali: Fear Eats the Soul (1974)
- Alias Jesse James (1959)
- Ali Zaoua: Prince of the Streets (2000)
- Alias Nick Beal (1949)
- Alias the Night Wind (1923)
- Alibaba and the Thief (2015)
- Alibaba Aur 40 Chor: (1954, 1966 & 1980)
- Alibi: (1929, 1931, 1942 & 1969)
- The Alibi (2006)
- Alice: (1982, 1988, 1990, 2002, 2005, 2012 & 2022)
- Alice Adams (1935)
- Alice in the Cities (1974)
- Alice Doesn't Live Here Anymore (1974)
- Alice and Martin (1998)
- Alice Through the Looking Glass: (1987, 1998 TV & 2016)
- Alice in Wonderland: (1903, 1915, 1931, 1933, 1949, 1951, 1966, 1976, 1985 TV, 1988, 1999 TV, 2005 & 2010)
- Alice of Wonderland in Paris (1966)
- Alice, Darling (2022)
- Alice, Sweet Alice (1976)
- Alice's Adventures in Wonderland: (1910 short & 1972)
- Alice's Restaurant (1969)
- Alicia (1974)
- Alien series:
  - Alien (1979)
  - Aliens (1986)
  - Alien 3 (1992)
  - Alien Resurrection (1997)
  - Prometheus (2012)
  - Alien: Covenant (2017)
  - Alien: Romulus (2024)
- Alien 2: On Earth (1980)
- Alien Abduction: (2005 & 2014)
- Alien Adventure (1999)
- Alien Apocalypse (2005 TV)
- Alien Autopsy (2006)
- Alien Contamination (1980)
- Alien Dead (1980)
- The Alien Encounters (1979)
- The Alien Factor (1978)
- Alien Hunter (2003) (TV)
- Alien Intruder (1993)
- Alien Lockdown (2004) (TV)
- Alien Love Triangle (2008)
- Alien Nation series:
  - Alien Nation (1988)
  - Alien Nation: Body and Soul (1995)
  - Alien Nation: Dark Horizon (1994)
  - Alien Nation: The Enemy Within (1996)
  - Alien Nation: Millennium (1996)
  - Alien Nation: The Udara Legacy (1997)
- Alien vs. Predator (2004)
- Aliens vs. Predator: Requiem (2007)
- Alienator (1989) (TV)
- Aliens in the Attic (2009)
- Aliens of the Deep (2005)
- Alila (2003)
- Alison's Birthday (1981)
- Alissa in Concert (1990)
- Alita: Battle Angel (2019)
- Alive: (1993, 2002, 2006, 2014 & 2020)
- Alive: 20 Years Later (1993)
- Alkohol (1919)

==== All ====
- All About Anna (2005)
- All About the Benjamins (2002)
- All About Eve (1950)
- All About Evil (2010)
- All About Lily Chou-Chou (2001)
- All About My Mother (1999)
- All About Steve (2009)
- All About Women (2008)
- All Apologies (2012)
- All the Boys Are Called Patrick (1957)
- All the Boys Love Mandy Lane (2006)
- All Cheerleaders Die: (2001 & 2013)
- All the Colors of the Dark (1972)
- All Creatures Great and Small (1974)
- All the Devils Are Here (2025)
- An All Dogs Christmas Carol (1998)
- All Dogs Go to Heaven (1989)
- All Dogs Go to Heaven 2 (1996)
- All Eyez on Me (2017)
- All Fall Down (1962)
- All Fun and Games (2023)
- All Good Things (2010)
- All Hallows' Eve: (2013 & 2016)
- All Hallows' Eve 2 (2015)
- All Hands on Deck: (1961 & 2020)
- All Hell Broke Loose (1995)
- All I Want (2002)
- All I Want for Christmas (1991)
- All Is Well: (2011, 2015 & 2018)
- All Is Lost (2013)
- All Is True (2018)
- All the Invisible Children (2005)
- All the King's Men: (1949, 1971 TV, 1999 TV & 2006)
- All Ladies Do It (1992)
- All Light Will End (2018)
- All Light, Everywhere (2021)
- All of Me: (1934 & 1984)
- All Men Are Mortal (1995)
- All Monsters Attack (1969)
- All My Babies (1953)
- All My Compatriots (1968)
- All My Friends Are Back in Brisbane (2026)
- All My Friends Are Funeral Singers (2010)
- All My Friends Are Leaving Brisbane (2007)
- All My Friends Hate Me (2021)
- All My Lenins (1997)
- All My Life: (1966, 2004, 2008 & 2020)
- All My Loved Ones (1999)
- All My Sons (1948)
- All Night Long: (1962 & 1981)
- All Night Long series:
  - All Night Long (1992)
  - All Night Long 2 (1995)
  - All Night Long 3 (1996)
- All or Nothing (2002)
- All Over the Guy (2001)
- All Over Me (1997)
- All the Best (2009)
- All the Bright Places (2020)
- All the Money in the World (2017)
- All the President's Men (1976)
- All the Pretty Horses (2000)
- All the Queen's Men (2001)
- All Quiet on the Western Front: (1930, 1979 & 2022)
- All the Real Girls (2003)
- All the Right Moves (1983)
- All Roads Lead Home (2008)
- All Roads Lead to Rome: (1949 & 2015)
- All Roads to Pearla (2019)
- All Souls Day (2005)
- All That Falls Has Wings (1990)
- All That Heaven Allows (1955)
- All That Jazz (1979)
- All That We Love (2025)
- All These Sleepless Nights (2016)
- All These Women (1964)
- All Things Fair (1995)
- All This and Rabbit Stew (1941)
- All This, and Heaven Too (1940)
- All Through the Night (1941)
- All Together Now (2008)
- All Under the Moon (1993)
- All of Us Strangers (2023)
- All for the Winner (1990)
- All You Need Is Blood (2023)
- All You Need Is Cash (1978)
- All You Need Is Love (2015)
- All's Well, Ends Well (1992)
- All's Well, Ends Well Too (1993)
- All-American Murder (1992)
- Allan Quatermain and the Lost City of Gold (1987)
- Allari Bullodu (2005)
- Allegro Non Troppo (1977)
- Allen (2026)
- Allende en su laberinto (2014)
- Alles auf Zucker! (2004)
- Alley Cats Strike (2000) (TV)
- Alli (1964)
- Allied (2016)
- Alligator (1980)
- Alligator II: The Mutation (1990)
- The Allnighter (1987)
- All-Star Weekend (TBD)
- Alluda Majaka (1995)

==== Alm–Alz ====
- Almanac of Fall (1984)
- Almighty Zeus (2022)
- The Almond and the Seahorse (2022)
- Almost An Angel (1990)
- Almost Angels (1962)
- Almost Christmas (2016)
- Almost Famous (2000)
- Almost Friends: (2014 & 2016)
- Almost a Gentleman: (1938 & 1939)
- Almost Heroes (1998)
- Almost Human: (1927, 1974 & 2013)
- Almost Love (2006)
- Almost Married: (1919, 1932 & 1942)
- Almost Paris (2016)
- Almost Summer (1978)
- Almost There (2014)
- Almost You (1985)
- Aloha (2015)
- Alone: (1931 French, 1931 Soviet, 2004, 2007, 2008, 2015 Hindi, 2015 Kannada, 2020 horror, 2020 thriller & 2022)
- Alone in Berlin (2016)
- Alone in the Dark: (1982 & 2005)
- Along Came Polly (2004)
- Along Came a Spider (2001)
- Along with the Gods: The Last 49 Days (2018)
- Along with the Gods: The Two Worlds (2017)
- Along the Oregon Trail (1947)
- L'Alpagueur (1976)
- Alpha: (2018 & 2019)
- Alpha Dog (2006)
- Alpha and Omega (2010)
- Alphabet City (1984)
- The Alphabet Killer (2008)
- The Alphabet Murders (1965)
- Alphaville (1965)
- Alps (2011)
- The Alps (2007)
- Alraune: (1918, 1928, 1930 & 1952)
- Alraune, die Henkerstochter, genannt die rote Hanne (1918)
- Alt (2013)
- Altamira (2016)
- Altar (2014)
- Altar Boy (2021)
- Altars of the World (1976)
- Altered: (2007 & 2025)
- Altered Reality (2024)
- Altered Species (2001)
- Altered States (1980)
- Altitude (2010)
- Altman (2014)
- The Alto Knights (2025)
- Alucarda (1978)
- Alvin and the Chipmunks series:
  - Alvin and the Chipmunks (2007)
  - Alvin and the Chipmunks Meet Frankenstein (1999)
  - Alvin and the Chipmunks Meet the Wolfman (2000)
  - Alvin and the Chipmunks: Chipwrecked (2011)
  - Alvin and the Chipmunks: Road Trip (2015)
  - Alvin and the Chipmunks: The Squeakquel (2009)
- Alvin Purple (1973)
- Alvorada (1962)
- Always: (1989 & 2011)
- Always Another Dawn (1948)
- Always Audacious (1920)
- Always Be My Maybe: (2016 & 2019)
- Always Be the Winners (1994)
- Always Be with You (2017)
- Always Brando (2011)
- Always a Bridesmaid (2019)
- Always on Duty (1960)
- Always Kabhi Kabhi (2011)
- Always Leave Them Laughing (1949)
- Always in My Heart (1942)
- Always a New Beginning (1974)
- Always Outnumbered (1998) (TV)
- Always Sanchōme no Yūhi (2005)
- Always Shine (2016)
- Always Together (1947)
- Always in Trouble (1938)
- Always Watching: A Marble Hornets Story (2015)
- Always in the Way (1915)
- Always Yours (2007)
- Alyas Batman at Robin (1965)
- Alyas Batman en Robin (1991)
- Alyas Pogi Series:
  - Alyas Pogi: Birador ng Nueva Ecija (1990)
  - Alyas Pogi 2 (1992)
  - Alyas Pogi: Ang Pagbabalik (1999)
- Alyas Pusa: Ang Taong May 13 Buhay (1988)
- Alzheimer's (2010)

=== Am ===
- Am I Beautiful? (1998)
- Am I Guilty? (1940)
- Am I Next (2023)
- Am I OK? (2022)

==== Ama ====
- Ama (2021)
- Ama Girls (1958)
- Ama Namin (1998)
- Ama'ara: The Song of the Whales (2021)
- Amaanaaiy (1998)
- Amaanat: (1977 & 1994)
- Amaayakuraalu (1971)
- Amader Choto Russel Shona (2023)
- Amadeus (1984)
- Amador (2010)
- Amai Muchi (2013)
- Amakye and Dede (2016)
- Amala (2023)
- Amalfi: Rewards of the Goddess (2009)
- Amami (1993)
- Aman (1967)
- Amanat: (1955, 1981, 2016 & 2022)
- Amanda: (2009, 2018 & 2022)
- Amanda and the Alien (1995) (TV)
- Amanda & Jack Go Glamping (2017)
- Amandla (2022)
- Amandla!: A Revolution in Four-Part Harmony (2002)
- Amanece (2023)
- Amanecer (2009)
- Amang Hustler (1987)
- Les Amants du Pont-Neuf (1991)
- Amapola (2014)
- Amar: (1954, 2017 & 2019)
- Amar Akbar Anthony (1977)
- Amar Akbar & Tony (2015)
- Amar Aponjon (2017)
- Amar Bhoopali (1951)
- Amar Bodyguard (2013)
- Amar Bondhu Rashed (2011)
- Amar Deep (1979)
- Amar Jyoti (1936)
- Amar Kahani (1949)
- Amar Kantak (1986)
- Amar Prem (1971)
- Amar Rahe Yeh Pyar (1961)
- Amaram (1991)
- Amarcord (1973)
- Amardeep (1958)
- Amarkkalam (1999)
- Amateur: (1994 & 2018)
- The Amateur: (1981, 1999 & 2025)
- The Amateurs (2005)
- The Amazing Colossal Man (1957)
- The Amazing Dr. Clitterhouse (1938)
- Amazing Grace: (1974, 2006 & 2015)
- The Amazing Grace (2006)
- The Amazing Howard Hughes (1977) (TV)
- The Amazing Maurice (2022)
- The Amazing Mr. Blunden (1972)
- The Amazing Mr. Williams (1939)
- The Amazing Mr. X (1948)
- The Amazing Mrs. Holliday (1943)
- The Amazing Panda Adventure (1995)
- The Amazing Spider-Man (2012)
- The Amazing Spider-Man 2 (2014)
- The Amazing Transparent Man (1960)
- The Amazing Truth About Queen Raquela (2008)
- Amazon: (1990, 1997 & 2000)
- Amazon Women on the Moon (1987)
- Amazons: (1984 TV & 1986)
- The Amazons (1917)

==== Amb–Amy ====
- The Ambassador: (1936, 1960, 1984 American, 1984 Croatian, 2005 TV & 2011)
- An Ambition Reduced to Ashes (1995)
- Amblin' (1968)
- Ambulance (2022)
- The Ambulance (1990)
- Ambush Bay (1966)
- Ambush at Cimarron Pass (1958)
- The Ambushers (1967)
- Amelia (2009)
- Amelia Earhart (1976) (TV)
- Amélie (2001)
- Amen: (2010, 2011 & 2013)
- Amen. (2002)
- Amer (2009)
- America: (1924, 2009 TV & 2011)
- America America: (1963, 1983 & 1997)
- America: From Freedom to Fascism (2006)
- America's Heart and Soul (2004)
- America's Sweethearts (2001)
- The American: (1927 & 2010)
- American Animals (2018)
- The American Astronaut (2001)
- American Beach House (2015)
- American Beauty: (1927 & 1999)
- The American Beauty (1916)
- American Boy: A Profile of Steven Prince (1978)
- American Buffalo (1996)
- An American Carol (2008)
- American Casino (2009)
- An American Christmas Carol (1979) (TV)
- An American Crime (2007)
- American Desi (2001)
- American Dharma (2018)
- American Dog (2008)
- American Dream (1990)
- An American Dream (1966)
- The American Dream (2022)
- The American Dreamer (1971)
- American Dreamz (2006)
- The American Epic Sessions (2017)
- American Fable (2016)
- American Fiction (2023)
- American Flyers (1985)
- The American Friend (1977)
- American Friends (1991)
- American Gangster (2007)
- The American Gangster (1992)
- American Gigolo (1980)
- American Girl (2002)
- American Girl (2021)
- American Girls (1918)
- American Gothic: (1988 & 2007)
- American Graffiti (1973)
- American Guerrilla in the Philippines (1950)
- American Gun: (2002 & 2005)
- American Hardcore (2006)
- An American Haunting (2006)
- American Heart (1992)
- American Heist (2014)
- An American Hippie in Israel (1972)
- American History X (1998)
- American Honey (2016)
- American Hustle (2013)
- American Kickboxer (1991)
- American Kickboxer 2 (1993)
- American Made (2017)
- American Madness (1932)
- American Mary (2012)
- American Me (1992)
- American Movie (1999)
- American Ninja series:
  - American Ninja (1985)
  - American Ninja 2: The Confrontation (1987)
  - American Ninja 3: Blood Hunt (1989)
  - American Ninja 4: The Annihilation (1990)
  - American Ninja V (1993)
- American Outlaws (2001)
- An American in Paris (1951)
- American Pastime (2007)
- American Pastoral (2016)
- An American Pickle (2020)
- American Pie series:
  - American Pie (1999)
  - American Pie 2 (2001)
  - American Pie 3: American Wedding (2003)
  - American Pie Presents Band Camp (2005)
  - American Pie 5: The Naked Mile (2007)
  - American Pie Presents: Beta House (2007)
  - American Pie Presents: The Book of Love (2009)
  - American Reunion (2012)
  - American Pie Presents: Girls' Rules (2020)
- American Pop (1981)
- The American President (1995)
- American Psycho (2000)
- American Psycho 2: All American Girl (2002)
- An American Rhapsody (2001)
- The American Scream (2012)
- American Shaolin (1991)
- American Sniper (2014)
- American Son (2019)
- American Splendor (2003)
- American Sweatshop (2025)
- An American Tail series:
  - An American Tail (1986)
  - An American Tail: Fievel Goes West (1991)
  - An American Tail: The Mystery of the Night Monster (1999)
  - An American Tail: The Treasure of Manhattan Island (1998)
- American Terror (2009)
- American Ultra (2015)
- American Underdog (2021)
- American Utopia (2020)
- American Violet (2009)
- An American Werewolf in London (1981)
- An American Werewolf in Paris (1997)
- Americana: (1983 & 2025)
- Americanese (2009)
- The Americanization of Emily (1964)
- Americathon (1979)
- Americký souboj (1913)
- A.M.I. (2019)
- Le Amiche (1955)
- Amigo (2010)
- Amigomío (1994)
- Amish Grace (2010)
- Amistad (1997)
- The Amityville Horror series:
  - The Amityville Horror: (1979 & 2005)
  - Amityville II: The Possession (1982)
  - Amityville 3-D (1983)
  - Amityville 4: The Evil Escapes (1984)
  - The Amityville Curse (1990)
  - Amityville: It's About Time (1992)
  - Amityville: A New Generation (1993)
  - Amityville Dollhouse (1996)
  - Amityville: The Awakening (2017)
  - The Amityville Harvest (2020)
- Ammonite (2020)
- Amnesiac (2014)
- Among the Living: (1941 & 2014)
- Among the Shadows (2019)
- L'Amore in Città (1953)
- Amore! (1993)
- Amores perros (2000)
- Amorosa: (1986 & 2012)
- Amos & Andrew (1993)
- Amour: (1970 & 2012)
- L'Amour braque (1985)
- L'amour fou (1969)
- L'amour à mort (1984)
- The Amphibian Man (1962)
- Amreeka (2009)
- Amsterdam: (2013 & 2022)
- Amsterdamned (1988)
- Amsterdamned II (2025)
- Amuck! (1972)
- Amulet (2020)
- Amusement (2008)
- The Amusement Park (1975)
- The Amusements of Private Life (1990)
- Amy: (1981, 1984 TV, 1997 & 2015)
- The Amy Fisher Story (1993)

=== An ===
==== Ana–Ane ====
- Ana: (1982 & 2020)
- Ana, mon amour (2017)
- Ana wa Banati (1961)
- Ana y Bruno (2018)
- Ana and the Others (2003)
- Ana and the Wolves (1973)
- Anaachadanam (1969)
- Anaadhai Penn (1938)
- Anaagat (2019)
- Anaam (1992)
- Anaamika (2014)
- Anaan (2017)
- Anaarkali of Aarah (2017)
- Anaavaranam (1976)
- Anaconda series:
  - Anaconda: (1997, 2024 & 2025)
  - Anacondas: The Hunt for the Blood Orchid (2004)
  - Anaconda 3: Offspring (2008) (TV)
  - Anacondas: Trail of Blood (2009) (TV)
  - Lake Placid vs. Anaconda (2015) (TV)
- Anahat (2003)
- Analyze That (2002)
- Analyze This (1999)
- Anamika: (1973 & 2008)
- Anamorph (2007)
- Anand: (1971 & 2004)
- The Anarchist Cookbook (2002)
- Anarchists (2000)
- Anari: (1959, 1975 & 1993)
- Anastasia: (1956 & 1997)
- Anatomy (2000)
- Anatomy 2 (2003)
- Anatomy of Hell (2004)
- Anatomy of a Fall (2023)
- Anatomy of a Murder (1959)
- Anbe Aaruyire: (1975 & 2005)
- Anbe Sivam (2003)
- Anchoress (1993)
- Anchorman: The Legend of Ron Burgundy (2004)
- Anchorman 2: The Legend Continues (2013)
- Anchors Aweigh (1945)
- The Ancient Law (1923)
- The Ancient Mariner (1925)
- The Ancines Woods (1970)
- And the Band Played On (1993)
- And Everything is Going Fine (2010)
- And God Created Woman: (1956 & 1988)
- ...And Justice for All (1979)
- And Life Goes On (1992)
- And Now My Love (1974)
- And Now for Something Completely Different (1971)
- And Now... Ladies and Gentlemen (2002)
- And the Sea Will Tell (1991)
- And the Ship Sails On (1983)
- And Soon the Darkness: (1970 & 2010)
- And the Spring Comes (2007)
- And Then There Were None: (1945, 1974 & 1987)
- And Then We Danced (2019)
- And While We Were Here (2013)
- And You Thought Your Parents Were Weird (1991)
- Andaaz (2003)
- An Andalusian Dog (1929)
- Andarivaadu (2005)
- Andaz: (1949 & 1994)
- Andaz Apna Apna (1994)
- The Anderson Tapes (1971)
- Andhrawala (2004)
- Andolan (1995)
- Andover (2017)
- Andre (1994)
- Andre Gregory: Before and After Dinner (2013)
- Andrei Rublev (1966)
- Andrew and Jeremy Get Married (2004)
- Androcles and the Lion (1952)
- Android (1982)
- The Andromeda Nebula (1967)
- The Andromeda Strain (1971)
- Anemone (2025)

==== Ang–Anh ====
- Ang Alamat ng Lawin (2002)
- Ang Anino ni Asedillo (1988)
- Ang Babaeng Walang Pakiramdam (2021)
- Ang Cute ng Ina Mo! (2007)
- Ang Daigdig Ko'y Ikaw (1965)
- Ang Dalawang Mrs. Reyes (2018)
- Ang Dalubhasa (2000)
- Ang Darling Kong Aswang (2009)
- Ang Huling Henya (2013)
- Ang Ika-Labing Isang Utos: Mahalin Mo, Asawa Mo (1994)
- Ang.: Lone (1970)
- Ang Tanging Ina (2003)
- Angel: (1937, 1966 short, 1982 Greek, 1982 Irish, 1984, 1987, 2007, 2009 & 2011)
- Ángel (2007)
- The Angel: (1982 & 2007 short)
- Angel II (1988)
- Angel III (1989)
- Angel on the Amazon (1948)
- Angel Baby: (1961 & 1995)
- Angel and the Badman (1947)
- Angel Eyes (2001)
- Angel Face: (1953, 1998 & 2018)
- Angel Has Fallen (2019)
- Angel Heart (1987)
- Angel of the Lord (2005)
- Angel of the Lord 2 (2016)
- Angel in My Pocket (1969)
- Angel on My Shoulder (1946)
- An Angel at My Table (1990)
- Angel Rodriguez (2005)
- An Angel for Satan (1966)
- Angel Square (1990)
- The Angel with the Trumpet: (1948 & 1950)
- Angel's Egg (1985)
- The Angel's Egg (2006)
- Angel-A (2005)
- Angela: (1978 & 1995)
- Angela's Ashes (1999)
- Angelfist (1993)
- Angels: (1990 & 2007)
- Angels & Demons (2009)
- Angels & Insects (1995)
- Angels Fallen (2020)
- Angels with Dirty Faces (1938)
- Angels in the Endzone (1997)
- Angels in the Infield (2000)
- Angels One Five (1952)
- Angels in the Outfield: (1951 & 1994)
- Angels of Sin (1943)
- The Angels Wash Their Faces (1939)
- Angels in White (2012)
- Anger Management (2003)
- Angie: (1993 & 1994)
- Angoor: (1982 & 2013)
- Angora Love (1929)
- The Angry Birds Movie (2016)
- The Angry Birds Movie 2 (2019)
- The Angry Red Planet (1959)
- Angry Video Game Nerd: The Movie (2014)
- Angst: (1928, 1976, 1983, 2000 & 2003)
- Anguish (1987)
- Angulimaal (1960)
- Angulimala: (2003 & 2013)
- Angus (1995)
- Angus, Thongs and Perfect Snogging (2008)
- Anhe Ghore Da Daan (2011)
- Anhonee: (1952 & 1973)
- Anhoni (1973)

==== Ani–Anz ====
- Aniki-Bóbó (1942)
- Anima Mundi (1991)
- Animal: (1977, 2001, 2005 & 2014)
- The Animal (2001)
- Animal Crackers: (1930 & 2018)
- Animal Factory (2000)
- Animal Farm: (1954, 1999 TV & 2025)
- Animal Friends (2027)
- Animal House (1978)
- Animal Kingdom (2010)
- The Animal Kingdom (1932)
- Animals Are Beautiful People (1974)
- Animalympics (1980)
- The Animatrix series:
  - Beyond (2003)
  - A Detective Story (2003)
  - Final Flight of the Osiris (2003)
  - Kid's Story (2003)
  - Matriculated (2003)
  - Program (2003)
  - The Second Renaissance (2003)
  - World Record (2003)
- Anjaam (1994)
- Anjali: (1977 & 1990)
- Anjaneya (2003)
- Ankahee: (1985 & 2006)
- Ankuram (1993)
- Anmol (1993)
- Ankoku Joshi (2017)
- Anna: (1951, 1964, 1967 & 1987)
- Anna and the Apocalypse (2018)
- Anna Christie: (1923, 1930 English & 1930 German)
- Anna Karamazoff (1991)
- Anna Karenina: (1911, 1914, 1915, 1918, 1920, 1935, 1948, 1953, 1961 TV, 1967, 1975, 1985 TV, 1997 & 2012)
- Anna Karenina: Vronsky's Story (2017)
- Anna and the King (1999)
- Anna and the King of Siam (1946)
- Anna In Kungfuland (2003)
- Anna M. (2007)
- Annabelle series:
  - Annabelle (2014)
  - Annabelle: Creation (2017)
  - Annabelle Comes Home (2019)
- Annaamalai (1992)
- Annamayya (1997)
- Annapolis (2006)
- Anne at 13,000 Ft. (2019)
- "§ Anne Frank Parallel Stories" (2019)
- Anne Frank Remembered (1995)
- Anne Frank: The Whole Story (2001 TV)
- Anne of Green Gables: (1919, 1934, 1956 TV, 1985 TV & 2016 TV)
- Anne no Nikki (1995)
- Anne of the Thousand Days (1969)
- Anne of Windy Poplars (1940)
- Annette (2021)
- Annie: (1976, 1982, 1999 TV & 2014)
- Annie Get Your Gun (1950)
- Annie Hall (1977)
- Annie's Coming Out (1984)
- Annie: A Royal Adventure! (1995 TV)
- Annihilation (2018)
- The Anniversary: (1968 & 2004 short)
- The Anniversary Party (2001)
- Anniyan (2005)
- Anon (2018)
- Anonymous (2011)
- The Anonymous Heroes (1971)
- Anonymous Rex (2004 TV)
- The Anonymous Venetian (1970)
- Anonymously Yours (2021)
- Anora (2024)
- Another (2012)
- Another 48 Hrs. (1990)
- Another Country (1984)
- Another Day in Paradise (1998)
- Another Earth (2011)
- Another Fine Mess (1930)
- Another Gay Movie (2006)
- Another Girl Another Planet (1992)
- Another Happy Day (2011)
- Another Man's Poison (1952)
- Another Nice Mess (1972)
- Another Public Enemy (2005)
- Another Round (2020)
- Another Simple Favor (2025)
- Another Stakeout (1993)
- Another Thin Man (1939)
- Another Time, Another Place: (1958 & 1983)
- Another Wild Idea (1934)
- Another Woman (1988)
- Another Year (2010)
- Another You (1991)
- The Answer Man (2009)
- The Ant Bully (2006)
- Antar Mahal (2005)
- Antarctic Journal (2005)
- Antarnaad (1991)
- Antham (1992)
- Anthony Adverse (1936)
- Anthony Kaun Hai (2006)
- Anthony Zimmer (2005)
- Anthropocene: The Human Epoch (2018)
- Anthropoid (2016)
- Antibirth (2016)
- Antibodies (2005)
- Antichrist (2009)
- The Antichrist (1974)
- Antitrust (2001)
- Antiviral (2012)
- Antlers (2021)
- Ant-Man series:
  - Ant-Man (2015)
  - Ant-Man and the Wasp (2018)
  - Ant-Man and the Wasp: Quantumania (2023)
- Antoine and Colette (1962)
- Anton Tchékhov 1890 (2015)
- Antoni Gaudí (1984)
- Antonia's Line (1995)
- Antonia: A Portrait of the Woman (1974)
- Antropophagus (1981)
- Antwone Fisher (2002)
- Antz (1998)
- Anupama: (1966 & 1981)
- Anusandhan (2021)
- Anvil! The Story of Anvil (2009)
- Any Bonds Today? (1942)
- Any Day Now: (1976, 2012 & 2020)
- Any Given Sunday (1999)
- Any Way the Wind Blows (2003)
- Any Wednesday (1966)
- Any Which Way You Can (1980)
- Anyone Can Play Guitar (2010)
- Anyone but Them (2018)
- Anyone but You (2023)
- Anything for Bread (1991)
- Anything Else (2003)
- Anything for Jackson (2020)
- Anything for Love (1993 TV)
- Anything to Survive (1990)
- Anytown, USA (2005)
- Anywhere But Here (1999)
- Anzio (1968)

=== Ao–Aq ===
- Ao: The Last Hunter (2010)
- Ao Oni (2014)
- Aoi sanmyaku (1949)
- Aoi Shinju (1951)
- Aola Star (2015)
- Aozora Yell (2016)
- Ap' ta kokala vgalmena (2011)
- Apa Jang Kau Tjari, Palupi? (1969)
- Apa Khabar Orang Kampung (2007)
- Apaadi (2009)
- Apaayavide Eccharike (2025)
- Apache (1954)
- Apache Blood (1973)
- Apache Drums (1951)
- Apache Gold (1963)
- Apache Junction (2021)
- Apache Territory (1958)
- Apache Woman: (1955 & 1976)
- Apaches (1977)
- Apan Amar Apan (1990)
- Apapacho (2019)
- Aparaahnam (1991)
- Aparaajitha (1977)
- Aparadhi: (1949, 1976, 1977 & 2009)
- Aparadhini (1968)
- Aparajito: (1956 & 2022)
- Aparan (1988)
- Aparichita: (1969 & 1978)
- Aparichithan (2004)
- Aparna: (1981 & 1993)
- Aparoopa (1982)
- Apart: (2011 & 2021)
- Apart Together (2010)
- Apart from You (1933)
- Apartado de correos 1001 (1950)
- Apartment (2010)
- The Apartment: (1960 & 1996)
- Apartment 4E (2012)
- Apartment 7A (2024)
- Apartment 143 (2012)
- Apartment 407 (2016)
- Apartment 1303 (2007)
- Apartment 1303 3D (2012)
- Apartment Eight (1987)
- Apartment Hunting (2000)
- Apartment No. 13 (1991)
- Apartment Troubles (2014)
- Apartment Zero (1988)
- Apasionados (2002)
- Ape: (1976 & 2012)
- The Ape: (1940, 2005, 2009)
- The Ape Man (1943)
- Ape and Super-Ape (1972)
- The Ape Woman (1964)
- Apocalypse Cult (2014)
- Apocalypse Now (1979)
- Apocalypto (2006)
- Apollo 10½: A Space Age Childhood (2022)
- Apollo 11 (2019)
- Apollo 13 (1995)
- Apollo 18 (2011)
- Apostle (2018)
- The Apostle (1997)
- App (2013)
- The App (2019)
- The Appaloosa (1966)
- Appaloosa (2008)
- The Apparition: (1903, 2012 & 2018)
- The Apple: (1980 & 1998)
- The Apple Dumpling Gang (1975)
- The Apple Dumpling Gang Rides Again (1979)
- The Appleton Ladies' Potato Race (2023)
- Apple Trees (1992)
- Apples (2020)
- Applesauce (2015)
- Appleseed: (1988 & 2004)
- Appleseed Alpha (2014)
- Appointment with Danger (1950)
- Appointment with Death (1988)
- Appointment with Venus (1951)
- The Apprenticeship of Duddy Kravitz (1974)
- Appropriate Adult (2011)
- Appu: (2000 & 2002)
- L'Appât: (1995 & 2010)
- April: (1961 & 1998)
- April 1, 2000 (1952)
- April 1st Vidudhala (1991)
- April Bride (2009)
- April and the Extraordinary World (2015)
- April Fool: (1926, 1964 & 2010)
- April Fool's Day: (1986 & 2008)
- April Fools: (2007 & 2015)
- April in Paris (1952)
- April Showers: (1923, 1948 & 2009)
- April Snow (2005)
- April Story (1998)
- APT (2006)
- Apt Pupil (1998)
- Apur Sansar (1959)
- Aqua Teen Forever: Plantasm (2022)
- The Aqua Teen Hunger Force Colon Movie Film for Theaters (2007)
- Aquaman (2018)
- Aquaman and the Lost Kingdom (2023)
- Aquamarine (2006)
- Aquanauts (1980)
- Aquarium (2022)
- Aquarium of the Dead (2021)
- Aquarius (2016)
- Aqui na Terra (1993)
- Aquí y allá (2012)
- Aquel famoso Remington (1982)

=== Ar ===
==== Ara–Arm ====
- Ara (2008)
- Arabella: (1924 & 1967)
- Arabella Black Angel (1989)
- Arabesque (1966)
- Arabesk (1989)
- Arabian Adventure (1979)
- Arabian Love (1922)
- Arabian Nights: (1942, 1974 & 2015)
- Arabikkadal (1983)
- Arabikkatha (2007)
- Arachnid (2001)
- Arachnophobia (1990)
- Arada (2018)
- Aradhana: (1962, 1969 & 1987)
- Araf (2006)
- Arafat, My Brother (2005)
- Aragami (2003)
- Arahan (2004)
- Arakawa Under the Bridge (2012)
- Aran (2006)
- Arang (2006)
- Aranmanai (2014)
- Aranmanai 2 (2016)
- Aranmanai 3 (2021)
- Aranmanai 4 (2024)
- Aranya Rodan (1993)
- Aranyer Din Ratri (1970)
- Ararat (2002)
- Arbitrage (2012)
- L'Arbre, le maire et la médiathèque (1993)
- Arcade (1993)
- Arcadian (2024)
- The Arch (1968)
- Arch of Triumph: (1948 & 1985 TV)
- Archangel: (1991 & 2005 TV)
- The Archangel (1969)
- Archie series:
  - Archie: To Riverdale and Back Again (1990 TV)
  - The Archies in Jugman (2007 TV)
- The Architecture of Doom (1989)
- Arco (2025)
- Arctic (2018)
- Arctic Blue (1993)
- Are We Done Yet? (2007)
- Are We There Yet? (2005)
- Are You in the House Alone? (1978 TV)
- Are You Scared? (2006)
- Are You There God? It's Me, Margaret. (2022)
- Area 51 (2015)
- The Arena: (1974 & 2001 TV)
- Arena: (1953, 1989, 2009 & 2011)
- Arena Wars (2024)
- Argentina, 1985 (2022)
- L'Argent: (1928 & 1983)
- Argo (2012)
- Argument About Basia (1995)
- Argylle (2024)
- Aria (1987)
- Arinthum Ariyamalum (2005)
- Arirang: (1926 & 2011)
- Arirang 3 (1936)
- Arirang Geuhu Iyagi (1930)
- Arisan! (2003)
- The Aristocats (1970)
- The Aristocrats (2005)
- Aristotle and Dante Discover the Secrets of the Universe (2022)
- Arizona Colt (1966)
- Arizona Dream (1993)
- Arizona Heat (1988)
- Arjun: (1985 & 2004)
- Ark (2004)
- Arkansas (2020)
- Arlington Road (1999)
- Armaan: (1966 & 2003)
- Armageddon: (1997 & 1998)
- Armageddon Time (2022)
- L'armata Brancaleone (1986)
- Armed (2018)
- Armed and Dangerous: (1986)
- Armed and Innocent (1994)
- Armitage III: Poly-Matrix (1997)
- Armor (2024)
- Armor Hero Atlas (2014)
- Armor Hero Captor King (2016)
- Armored (2009)
- Armored Car Robbery (1950)
- Armour of God series:
  - Armour of God (1987)
  - Armour of God II: Operation Condor (1991)
- The Armstrong Lie (2013)
- Army Intelligence (1994)
- Army of Darkness (1992)
- Army of the Dead: (2008 & 2021)
- Army of Shadows (1969)
- Army of Thieves (2021)
- L'Armée des ombres (1988)

==== Arn–Arz ====
- Arn: The Knight Templar (2007)
- Arnold (1973)
- Aro Tolbukhin: In the Mind of a Killer (2002)
- The Aroma of Tea (2006)
- Around the Bend (2004)
- Around a Small Mountain (2009)
- Around the World in 80 Days: (1956, 1988 & 2004)
- Around the World in 80 Minutes with Douglas Fairbanks (1931)
- Around the World Under the Sea (1966)
- Around the World with Dot (1981)
- Arranged (2007)
- The Arrangement (1969)
- Arrebato (1980)
- Arresting Gena (1997)
- Arrietty (2010)
- Arrival (2016)
- The Arrival: (1991 & 1996)
- The Arrival of Averill (1992)
- The Arrival from the Darkness (1921)
- Arrivée d'un train en gare de la Ciotat (1895)
- Arrivée d'un train gare de Vincennes (1896)
- L'Arroseur (1896)
- L'Arroseur Arrosé (1895)
- Arrowsmith (1931)
- Arsenal (1929)
- Arsenal (2017)
- The Arsenal Stadium Mystery (1940)
- Arsenic and Old Lace (1944)
- The Arsonist (1995)
- Arsène Lupin (2004)
- Art of Conflict: The Murals of Northern Ireland (2012)
- Art & Copy (2009)
- Art Deco Detective (1994)
- Art of the Devil series:
  - Art of the Devil (2004)
  - Art of the Devil 2 (2005)
  - Art of the Devil 3 (2008)
- Art of Fighting (2006)
- The Art of Getting By (2011)
- Art History (2011)
- Art Is... (1917)
- Art Is... The Permanent Revolution (2012)
- Art Museum by the Zoo (1998)
- The Art of Racing in the Rain (2019)
- Art and Remembrance: The Legacy of Felix Nussbaum (1993)
- Art School Confidential (2006)
- The Art of Seduction (2005)
- The Art of Self Defense (1941)
- The Art of Self-Defense (2019)
- Art Thief Musical! (2004)
- The Art of War (2000)
- The Art of War II: Betrayal (2008)
- The Art of War III: Retribution (2009)
- Artemis Fowl (2020)
- Artemisia (1998)
- Arth (1982)
- Arthur: (1981 & 2011)
- Arthur series:
  - Arthur and the Invisibles (2006)
  - Arthur and the Revenge of Maltazard (2009)
  - Arthur 3: The War of the Two Worlds (2011)
- Arthur 2: On the Rocks (1988)
- Arthur Christmas (2011)
- Arthur Newman (2012)
- Article 15 (2019)
- Article 20 (2024)
- Article 21 (2023)
- Article 370 (2024)
- Article 99 (1992)
- Article VI (2008)
- Artie Lange's Beer League (2006)
- Artificial Intelligence: A.I. (2001)
- Artificial Paradise (1990)
- Artist (2013)
- The Artist (2011)
- The Artist and the Mannikin (1900)
- The Artist and the Model (2012)
- The Artist's Wife (2019)
- Artists and Models: (1937 & 1955)
- Aru yo no Tonosama (1946)
- Arul (2004)
- Arundhati: (1967, 2009 & 2014)
- Aruna & Her Palate (2018)
- Arunachalam (1997)
- Arunodhayam (1971)
- Arunodoyer Agnishakkhi (1972)
- Aruva Velu (1996)
- Aruvaa Sanda (2022)
- Aruvadai Naal (1986)
- Aruvam (2019)
- Arwad (2013)
- Arya: (2004 & 2007)
- Arya 2 (2009)
- Aryan: (1988, 2006 & 2014)
- The Aryan (1916)
- Arzoo: (1950 & 1965)

=== As ===
- As Above, So Below (2014)
- As Cool as I Am (2013)
- As Crazy as It Gets (2015)
- As Dreams Are Made On (2004)
- As Far as My Feet Will Carry Me (2001)
- As God Commands (2008)
- As God Made Her (1920)
- As the Gods Will (2014)
- As Goes Janesville (2012)
- As Good as Dead: (1995 & 2010)
- As Good as It Gets (1997)
- As Good as Married (1937)
- As Good as New (1933)
- As Husbands Go (1934)
- As I Lay Dying (2013)
- As I Open My Eyes (2015)
- As I Was Moving Ahead Occasionally I Saw Brief Glimpses of Beauty (2000)
- As I'm Suffering From Kadhal (2017)
- As If I Am Not There (2010)
- As Ilf and Petrov rode a tram (1972)
- As in Heaven (1992)
- As Is (1986 TV)
- As It Is in Heaven (2004)
- As It Is In Life (1910)
- As Long as I Live (1946)
- As Long as the Roses Bloom (1956)
- As Long as They're Happy (1955)
- As Long as You Live (1955)
- As Long as You're Near Me (1953)
- As Long as You've Got Your Health (1966)
- As Luck Would Have It (2011)
- As Man Desires (1925)
- As Man Made Her (1917)
- As Men Love (1917)
- As Needed (2018)
- As Night Comes (2014)
- As Night Falls (2013)
- As One (2012)
- As Seen Through a Telescope (1900)
- As Tears Go By (1988)
- As White as in Snow (2001)
- As You Like It: (1936 & 2006)

==== Asa–Asy ====
- Asa Branca: Um Sonho Brasileiro (1981)
- Asa Nu Maan Watna Da (2004)
- Asad (2012)
- Asahinagu (2017)
- Asahiyama Zoo Story: Penguins in the Sky (2009)
- Asai Man Piyabanna (2007)
- Asalto a la ciudad (1968)
- Asambhav (2004)
- Asambhava (1986)
- Asandhimitta (2019)
- Asathal (2001)
- Ascendancy (1983)
- Ascension (2021)
- The Ascent: (1977 & 1994)
- Ascharya Fuck It (2018)
- Asehi Ekada Vhave (2018)
- Ash Is Purest White (2018)
- Ash Wednesday: (1925, 1931, 1958, 1973 & 2002)
- Ashani Sanket (1973)
- Ashanti: (1979 & 1982)
- Ashes and Diamonds (1958)
- Ashes in the Snow (2018)
- Ashes of Time (1994)
- Ashik Kerib (1988)
- Ashok (2006)
- Ashoka Vanamlo Arjuna Kalyanam (2022)
- Ashokan (1993)
- Asian Stories (2006)
- Ask the Dust (2006)
- Ask A Policeman (1939)
- Asoka: (1955 & 2001)
- Aspen Extreme (1993)
- The Asphalt Jungle (1950)
- The Assassin: (1961 & 2015)
- The Assassin of the Tsar (1991)
- Assassin of Youth (1937)
- Assassination: (1927, 1964, 1967, 1987 & 2015)
- The Assassination Bureau (1969)
- Assassination Classroom (2015)
- Assassination Classroom: Graduation (2016)
- Assassination of a High School President (2008)
- The Assassination of Jesse James by the Coward Robert Ford (2007)
- The Assassination of Richard Nixon (2004)
- The Assassination of Trotsky (1972)
- Assassination Nation (2018)
- Assassination Tango (2002)
- Assassins: (1995 & 2020)
- The Assassins (2012)
- Assassin's Creed (2016)
- Assault Girls (2009)
- Assault on a Queen (1966)
- Assault on Precinct 13: (1976 & 2005)
- Assault on Wall Street (2013)
- Assembly (2007)
- The Assessment (2024)
- Assia and the Hen with the Golden Eggs (1994)
- The Assignment: (1977, 1997 & 2016)
- Assimilate (2019)
- The Assistant: (1982, 1998, 2015 & 2019)
- Assunta Spina: (1915, 1930 & 1948)
- Asterix series:
  - Asterix and the Big Fight (1989)
  - Asterix in Britain (1986)
  - Asterix and Cleopatra (1968)
  - Asterix Conquers America (1994)
  - Asterix the Gaul (1967)
  - Asterix Versus Caesar (1985)
  - Asterix and the Vikings (2006)
- Asteroid (1997) (TV)
- Asteroid City (2023)
- The Astounding She-Monster (1957)
- Astro Boy (2009)
- The Astro-Zombies (1968)
- The Astronaut Farmer (2006)
- The Astronaut's Wife (1999)
- Asunder (1999)
- Asura (2018)
- Asylum: (1972 horror, 1972 documentary, 2003, 2005, 2008 & 2014)
- Asylum Blackout (2011)

=== At ===
- At All Costs (2016)
- At Any Price (2012)
- At Bay (1915)
- At First Sight: (1917 & 1999)
- At Cafe 6 (2016)
- At the Circus (1939)
- At Close Range (1986)
- At the Devil's Door (2014)
- At the Earth's Core (1976)
- At the Edge of Conquest: The Journey of Chief Wai-Wai (1992)
- At the Edge of the Law (1992)
- At the End of the Day: The Sue Rodriguez Story (1998)
- At Eternity's Gate (2018)
- At Five O'Clock in the Afternoon (1961)
- At Full Gallop (1996)
- At Gunpoint (1955)
- At Ground Zero (1994)
- At Home (1968)
- At Home Among Strangers (1974)
- At It Again (1912)
- At Land (1944)
- At Long Last Love (1975)
- At the Max (1991)
- At Middleton (2013)
- At Midnight I'll Take Your Soul (1964)
- At Night (2007)
- At Night All Cats Are Crazy (1977)
- At Night You Also Sleep (1956)
- At the Order of the Czar (1954)
- At Play in the Fields of the Lord (1991)
- At Point Blank (2003)
- At Risk (1994)
- At Stake (2017)
- At Sword's Edge (1952)
- At Sword's Point (1952)
- At War with the Army (1950)
- At World's End (2009)
- At Your Command, Madame (1942)
- At Your Doorstep (2016)
- At Your Orders, Madame (1939)
- At Your Orders, Sergeant (1932)
- At Your Threshold (1962)

==== Ata–Att ====
- L'Atalante (1934)
- Atanarjuat: The Fast Runner (2001)
- Atari: Game Over (2014)
- Atha Maga Rathiname (1994)
- Atha Okinti Kodale (1958)
- Athena: (1954 & 2022)
- Athisaya Piravi (1990)
- The Athlete (2009)
- Atithi Devo Bhava (2022)
- ATL (2006)
- Atlantic (1929)
- Atlantic City: (1944 & 1980)
- Atlantics (2019)
- Atlantis: (1913 & 1991)
- The Atlantis Interceptors (1983)
- Atlantis, the Lost Continent (1961)
- Atlantis: The Lost Empire (2001)
- Atlantis: Milo's Return (2003)
- Atlantis Rising (2017)
- Atlas Shrugged series:
  - Atlas Shrugged: Part I (2011)
  - Atlas Shrugged: Part II (2012)
  - Atlas Shrugged Part III: Who Is John Galt? (2014)
- ATM (2012)
- Atoll K (1950)
- Atomic Blonde (2017)
- The Atomic Cafe (1982)
- The Atomic Fireman (1952)
- The Atomic Kid (1954)
- The Atomic Man (1955)
- The Atomic Submarine (1959)
- Atomic Train (1999)
- Atonement: (1919, 2007 & 2026)
- Ator series:
  - Ator, the Fighting Eagle (1982)
  - Ator 2 – L'invincibile Orion (1984)
  - Iron Warrior (1987)
  - Quest for the Mighty Sword (1990)
- Atrabilious (2025)
- Atragon (1963)
- Attack: (1956 & 2016)
- The Attack: (1966 & 2012)
- Attack of the 50 Foot Cheerleader (2012)
- Attack of the 50 Foot Woman (1958)
- Attack of the 50 Ft. Woman (1993)
- Attack of the 60 Foot Centerfold (1995)
- Attack the Block (2011)
- Attack of the Crab Monsters (1957)
- Attack Force Z (1982)
- Attack the Gas Station (1999)
- Attack of the Giant Leeches (1959)
- Attack of the Killer Tomatoes (1978)
- Attack of the Killer Tomatoes: Organic Intelligence (2026)
- Attack of Life: The Bang Tango Movie (2016)
- Attack of the Monsters (1969)
- Attack of the Mushroom People (1963)
- Attack on the Pin-Up Boys (2007)
- Attack of the Puppet People (1958)
- Attack on Titan (2015)
- Attack: Part 1 (2022)
- The Attacks of 26/11 (2013)
- Attagasam (2004)
- Attenberg (2010)
- The Attic (2007)
- The Attic Expeditions (2001)
- Attica (1980) (TV)
- Attilas '74 (1975)
- Attraction (2017)

=== Au ===
- Au clair de la lune (1983)
- Au chic resto pop (1990)
- Au diable la vertu (1954)
- Au hasard Balthazar (1966)
- Au nom du Christ (1993)
- Au Pair series:
  - Au Pair (1999)
  - Au Pair II (2001)
  - Au Pair 3: Adventure in Paradise (2009)
- Au Pair Girls (1972)
- Au Pays Noir (1905)
- Au plus près du Soleil (2015)
- Au rendez-vous de la mort joyeuse (1973)
- Au revoir les enfants (1987)
- Au Revoir Taipei (2010)
- Au Revoir, UFO (2004)
- Au Secours! (1924)

==== Aub–Aut ====
- L'Auberge Espagnole (2002)
- The Auction Block: (1917 & 1926)
- The Auctioneer (1927)
- Audace colpo dei soliti ignoti (1959)
- The Audacious Mr. Squire (1923)
- The Audacity of Democracy (2009)
- Audible (2021)
- An Audience of Chairs (2018)
- Audience of One (2007)
- Audition: (1999, 2005 & 2007)
- The Audition: (2000 short, 2015 short & 2019)
- Auditions (1978)
- Audrey: (1916, 2014, 2020 & 2024)
- The Audrey Hepburn Story (2000 TV)
- Audrey Rose (1977)
- Audrey the Trainwreck (2010)
- Audrey's Children (2024)
- Audrie & Daisy (2016)
- Auf Herz und Nieren (2001)
- Auf Wiedersehen (1961)
- Auggie Rose (2000)
- August: (1996, 2008, 2011 & 2025)
- August 1 (1988)
- August 15 (2011)
- August 15th (2008)
- August 1975 (2021)
- August 1991 (2005 TV)
- August 2 (2012)
- August 22, This Year (2020)
- August 32nd on Earth (1998)
- August Rush (2006)
- August Underground series:
  - August Underground (2001)
  - August Underground's Mordum (2003)
  - August Underground's Penance (2007)
- The August Virgin (2019)
- August in the Water (1995)
- August: Osage County (2013)
- Augusta's Little Misstep (1933)
- Auguste (1961)
- Augustin (1995)
- Augustine (2012)
- Augusto Anibal quer casar (1923)
- Augustus the Strong (1936)
- Aulad: (1954, 1962, 1968 & 1987)
- Aulad Ke Dushman (1993)
- Auld Lang Syne: (1917, 1929 & 1937)
- Aum! (2021)
- Aum Mangalam Singlem (2022)
- Aunque es de noche (2023)
- Aunt Candela (1948)
- Aunt Clara (1954)
- Aunt Frieda (1965)
- Aunt Hilda! (2013)
- Aunt Sally (1933)
- Aunt Virginia (2023)
- The Auntie from Chicago (1957)
- Auntie Lee's Meat Pies (1992)
- Auntie Mame (1958)
- Aunty (1995)
- Aunty No. 1 (1998)
- Aunty Preethse (2001)
- Aur Ek Prem Kahani (1996)
- Aur Kaun? (1979)
- Aur Pappu Paas Ho Gaya (2007)
- Aur Pyaar Ho Gaya (1997)
- The Aura (2005)
- Aura Star: Attack of the Temple (2015)
- Aurangzeb (2013)
- Aurat: (1940, 1953 & 1967)
- Aurat Aurat Aurat (1996)
- Aurat Ka Pyar (1933)
- Aurat Raj (1979)
- Aurat Teri Yehi Kahani: (1954 & 1988)
- Aurelie Laflamme's Diary (2010)
- Auron Mein Kahan Dum Tha (2024)
- The Aurora Encounter (1986)
- Aurora: Operation Intercept (1995)
- Aurora's Sunrise (2022)
- Aurore (2005)
- Auschwitz (2011)
- The Auschwitz Report (2021)
- Austerlitz: (1960 & 2016)
- Austin Powers series:
  - Austin Powers in Goldmember (2002)
  - Austin Powers: International Man of Mystery (1997)
  - Austin Powers: The Spy Who Shagged Me (1999)
- Australia: (1989 & 2008)
- Australia After Dark (1975)
- Australia Calls: (1913 & 1923)
- Australia Day (2017)
- Australia's Own (1919)
- Australia's Peril (1917)
- The Australian Dream (2019)
- Australian Made: The Movie (1987)
- An Australian by Marriage (1923)
- Australian Rules (2002)
- Auto Driver: (1998 & 2015)
- Auto Focus (2002)
- An Auto and No Money (1932)
- Auto Raja: (1980, 1982 & 2013)
- Auto Shankar (2005)
- Autobiography (2022)
- Autobiography of a Princess (1975)
- Autoerotic: (2011 & 2021)
- Autograph: (2004, 2010 & 2023)
- Automaton Transfusion (2006)
- Automatons (2006)
- The Automobile Thieves (1906)
- Autopsy: (1975 & 2008)
- The Autopsy of Jane Doe (2016)
- Autour d'une cabine (1895)
- Autumn: (1930, 1974, 1990, 2008 & 2009)
- Autumn Adagio (2009)
- An Autumn Afternoon (1962)
- Autumn of Apple Trees (2020)
- Autumn Ball (2007)
- Autumn Leaves (1956)
- Autumn in March (2009)
- Autumn Moon (1992)
- Autumn in New York (2000)
- Autumn on the Rhine (1928)
- Autumn Sonata (1978)
- Autumn Tale (1998)
- Autumn Trip (1991)
- An Autumn Without Berlin (2015)
- An Autumn's Tale (1987)

=== Av ===
- Ava: (2017 French, 2017 Iranian, & 2020)
- Avakasi (1954)
- Aval: (1967, 1972 & 2017)
- Aval Appadithan (1978)
- Aval Appadithan 2 (2023)
- Aval Kaathirunnu Avanum (1986)
- Aval Kanda Lokam (1978)
- Aval Mella Sirithal (1987)
- Aval Oru Devaalayam (1977)
- Aval Oru Sindhu (1989)
- Aval Oru Thodar Kathai (1974)
- Aval Paavam (2000)
- Aval Peyar Thamizharasi (2010)
- Aval Potta Kolam (1995)
- Aval Sumangalithan (1985)
- Aval Varuvala (1998)
- Aval Viswasthayayirunnu (1978)
- Aval Yaar (1959)
- Avala Antharanga (1984)
- Avala Hejje (1981)
- Avala Neralu (1983)
- Avalalpam Vaikippoyi (1971)
- Avalanche Alley (2001)
- Avalon: (1990 & 2001)
- Avalon High (2010 TV)
- Avanti! (1972)
- Avatar: (1916 & 2004)
- Avatar Aang: The Last Airbender (2026)
- Avatar series:
  - Avatar (2009)
  - Avatar: The Way of Water (2022)
  - Avatar: Fire and Ash (2025)
- Avec les Hommes de l'eau (1938)
- The Avengers: (1950 & 1998)
- The Avengers series:
  - The Avengers (2012)
  - Avengers: Age of Ultron (2015)
  - Avengers: Infinity War (2018)
  - Avengers: Endgame (2019)
- Avenging Angelo (2002)
- Avengers Confidential: Black Widow & Punisher (2014)
- The Avenging Conscience (1914)
- Aventure Malgache (1944)
- Les Aventures de Till L'Espiègle (1956)
- An Average Little Man (1977)
- The Aviator: (1929, 1985 & 2004)
- The Aviator's Wife (1981)
- Avicii – I'm Tim (2024)
- Avicii: True Stories (2017)
- Avida (2006)
- Avidathe Pole Ivideyum (1985)
- Avittam Thirunaal Aarogya Sriman (1995)
- Aviv (2003)
- Aviva, My Love (2006)
- Aviyal (2016)
- Aviyal (2022)
- An Avocado Pit (2022)
- Avoir 20 ans dans les Aurès (1972)
- An Avonlea Christmas (1998) (TV)
- Avtaar (1983)
- Avuna (2003)
- Avunanna Kadanna (2005)
- Avunu (2012)
- Avunu 2 (2015)
- Avunu Valliddaru Ista Paddaru! (2002)
- Avurududa (1986)
- Avva (2008)
- Avvai Shanmugi (1996)
- Avvaiyyar (1953)
- L'avventura (1960)

=== Aw–Az ===
- Awaara (1951)
- Awaargi (1990)
- Await Further Instructions (2018)
- Awake: (2007, 2019 & 2021)
- Awakening: (1959 & 2013)
- The Awakening: (1917, 1928, 1954, 1956, 1980, 2006 & 2011)
- Awakening of Rip (1896)
- Awakenings (1990)
- Awara Paagal Deewana (2002)
- Awaragira (1990)
- Away from Her (2007)
- Away We Go (2009)
- Awesome; I Fuckin' Shot That! (2006)
- The Awful Truth (1937)
- An Awfully Big Adventure (1995)
- An Awkward Balance (2020)
- Awoken (2019)
- Ax 'Em (1992)
- Axe (1974)
- Axe Giant: The Wrath of Paul Bunyan (2013)
- Axel: The Biggest Little Hero (2013)
- Axel Munthe, The Doctor of San Michele (1962)
- Aya Sawan Jhoom Ke (1969)
- Ayam El-Sadat (2001)
- Aye Auto (1990)
- Ayee Milan Ki Bela (1964)
- Azhagan (1991)
- Azor (2021)
- Azrael (2024)
- The Aztec Mummy (1957)
- Aztec Revenge (2015)
- Azumi (2003)
- Azumi 2: Death or Love (2005)

Previous: List of films: 0–9 Next: List of films: B

== See also ==
- Lists of films
- Lists of actors
- List of film and television directors
- List of documentary films
- List of film production companies
