= Against the Wall =

Against the Wall may refer to:

- Against the Wall (1994 film), a 1994 film directed by John Frankenheimer
- Against the Wall (2010 film), a 2010 short directed by David Capurso and starring Russ Russo
- Against the Wall (TV series), a 2011 American crime drama television series
- "Against the Wall" (song), a 2018 song by Seether
- "Against the Wall", an episode of All Saints series
- "Against the Wall", a song by Ill Niño from the album Dead New World
- "Against the Wall", a song by Quiet Riot from their album Alive and Well
- Against the Wall: The Art of Resistance in Palestine, a book by British photojournalist William Parry
