= Age of Love =

Age of Love may refer to:

- The Age of Love (1954 film), an Argentine musical comedy film
- The Age of Love (2014 film), a 2014 documentary film about seniors looking for love
- Age of Love (TV series), a 2007 reality television show on NBC
- Age of Love (album), a 1997 studio album by Scooter
- "The Age of Love" (Age of Love song), 1990, or the Italian-Belgian duo who wrote and is mostly known for that song
- "The Age of Love" (Scooter song), 1997

== See also ==
- Age of consent, the minimum age at which a person is considered to be legally competent to consent to sexual acts
