= Sea fog =

Sea fog may refer to:

- A marine layer, an air mass that develops over the surface of a large body of water in the presence of a temperature inversion
- Sea Fog, a 2014 South Korean film
- Abyssal Spider (simplified Chinese: 海雾; traditional Chinese: 海霧; lit. 'Sea Fog'), a 2020 Taiwanese film
- "Sea Fog", a song by Keane from the album Strangeland

== See also ==
- Sea of fog
