= Pineau (surname) =

Pineau is a French surname.

Notable people with the surname include:

- Allison Pineau, (born 1989) French handballer and Olympic silver medallist
- Carol Pineau, American journalist and producer, writer, and director of documentary films
- Cédric Pineau, (born 1985) French former road bicycle racer
- Christian Pineau, (1904–1995) French Resistance fighter and Minister of Foreign Affairs
- Cleo Francis Pineau, (1893–1972) American World War I flying ace
- Franck Pineau, (born 1963) French former racing cyclist
- Gisèle Pineau, (born 1956) French novelist, writer and former psychiatric nurse
- Henry Pineau, (1863–1904) Canadian conservative politician
- Jacinthe Pineau, (born 1974) Canadian former competition swimmer
- Jérôme Pineau, (born 1980) French former professional road bicycle racer
- Joëlle Pineau, Canadian computer scientist and associate professor at McGill University
- Nicolas Pineau, (1684–1754) French carver and ornamental designer, who developed the Rococo style
- Paul Pineau, (1923–2006) French racing cyclist
