= Tali Avrahami =

Israeli filmmaker

- טלי אברהמי
- Born: 15 January 1969 (age 57); Rehovot, Israel
- Occupations: Filmmaker; entertainer

Tali Avrahami (Hebrew: טלי אברהמי; born 15 January 1969) is an Israeli filmmaker, producer, entertainer, and educator; a Chabad hasidic woman, who creates films aimed at an audience of haredi women.

== Biography ==
Avrahami was born in Rehovot, and was educated in Chabad schools. She went to the Chabad Beit Rivka College in Kfar Chabad, where she completed a BA-equivalent teaching degree in oral tradition, and an MA-equivalent degree in management. She worked as a teacher for 17 years, until 2004.

Avrahami is married to Shimon, lives in Kiryat Gat, and has nine children.

== Career ==
In 2004, Avrahami established the "Ruach Haya" (living spirit) production company, with the goal of creating entertainment and educational activities for the Haredi community, including educational and experiential workshops for schools and institutions. At this time, Avrahami began to develop and stage comedy for girls and women. Her performances are geared to empower and exalt women.

Her first stage show was "The Power in You", in 2005, performed by a troupe of about 20 women. The show played around the country, and became very popular in orthodox circles. It was quickly followed by "The Grace in You", and then a line of stage shows including "Voices", "Building', "Mom on Vacation", and more.

In 2010, Avrahami embarked on her filmmaking career, producing the film Sarah - One Against Many. It became an international blockbuster in orthodox communities around the world. In 2011, she made her directorial debut with The Fence, followed by the 2012 film Angels in White. Next came Bombey (2012), I Forgive (2013), Seniora (2014), Little Leaf (2017) and For a Change (2018).

In 2012, Avrahami was selected to participate in the film lab for haredi women called "Curtain Call", by the Gesher Multicultural Film Fund. It was the first program of its kind in the haredi community.

In 2018 Avrahami won the Minister of Education Uri Orbach Award for groundbreaking cinema relating to Jewish identity.

== Works ==
=== Stage/comedy ===
- 2005: The Power in You / הכח שבך
- 2005: The Grace in you / החן שבך
- 2006: The Power of Women, Together / כוחן של נשים, יחד
- 2007: Voices / קולות
- 2008: Voices 2 / קולות 2, .
- 2010: That He Created Me As He Wills / שעשני כרצונו
- 2012: Half and Half / חצי חצי
- 2012: This Too Shall Pass / נעבור גם את זה
- 2012: Mom on Vacation / אמא בחופשה
- 2014: Peace Upon You / שלום עליכם
- 2014: No Pressure / בלי לחץ
- 2016: The Team / הנבחרת
- 2016: Happy / מאושרת
- 2016: The Team 2 / הנבחרת 2
- 2017: He Who Gives Strength to the Weary / הנותן לעייפה כח
- 2018: אגרוייסע קולולולו

=== Filmography ===
- Sarah (2010)
- The Fence (2011)
- Angels in White (2012)
- Bombey (2012)
- I Forgive (2013)
- Seniora (2014)
- Little Leaf (2016)
- For a Change (2018)

== See also ==
- List of female film and television directors
