= KidVision =

Defunct American home video company (1992–2004)

- Industry: Video distributing for children
- Founded: 1992
- Defunct: 2004
- Fate: Closed folded into Warner Home Video
- Successor: Warner Home Video
- Headquarters: Los Angeles, California
- Owner: Warner Home Video
- Parent: Time Warner

KidVision was the children's home video division of A*Vision Entertainment, later WarnerVision Entertainment. It was launched in 1992 and started distributing videos in January 1993 with The Magic School Bus, Shining Time Station, Kidsongs and the Real Wheels and Real Animals series. In 1995, with WarnerVision Entertainment's pact with Dualstar Video, luring away from BMG Kidz, they picked up the Mary-Kate & Ashley titles.

On July 29, 1997, KidVision moved under Warner Home Video, and continued to distribute Magic School Bus videos until October 8, 2002.

It was also the Warner Home Video division that was distributed by Warner Bros.’ Family Entertainment unit.

== Video Releases ==
- Shining Time Station (1993–1994)
- Real Wheels (There Goes A... & Rockin' Real Wheels) (1993–1996, 1998–1999, 2001–2003)
- The Adventures of Mary-Kate & Ashley (1994–1997)
- Real Animals (1994–1998)
- The Magic School Bus (1994–2002)
- Kidsongs (1995)
- You're Invited to Mary-Kate & Ashley's (1995–1997)
- Baby Goes... (1995)
- Dream Big (1995)
- Fay Presents (1995)
- NASCAR For Kids (1995)
- Kathie Lee's Rock n' Tots Cafe (1995)
- Gumby: The Movie (1995)
- It’s Time to Potty (1996)
