= The Adventures of Mary-Kate & Ashley =

- The VHS cover for The Case of Thorn Mansion
- Genre: mystery; musical
- Created by: Michael Kruzan
- Starring: Mary-Kate Olsen; Ashley Olsen
- Country of origin: United States
- No. of episodes: 11

Production
- Running time: approx. 30 minutes (per episode)
- Production company: Dualstar Video

Original release
- Release: September 13, 1994 – March 18, 1997

The Adventures of Mary-Kate & Ashley is a series of musical mystery videos starring twin actresses Mary-Kate and Ashley Olsen. The series was also written as children's books. A set of books was written as a companion piece to the show, showing the twins on the cover. The video series was released between September 13, 1994 and March 18, 1997 and distributed by BMG Kidz and KidVision.

== Format ==
Each short film begins with Mary-Kate and Ashley Olsen who sing the theme song. Following the theme song, the twin sisters receive a phone call, informing them of some urgent mystery that needs to be solved. Their motto is "We’ll solve any crime by dinnertime". Each short film features the girls who sing multiple songs about the mystery that they are working on. They never fail to solve the mystery with their sidekick Clue (a Basset Hound dog). Indeed, the solution is usually something (either very obvious or very trivial) to give all the short films a humorous ending.

== Plot outlines ==
Each episode is named "The Adventures of Mary-Kate & Ashley" followed by the name of the mystery.

1. The Case of Thorn Mansion (1994)
A ghost is supposedly haunting a mansion in Transylvania, and the girls must figure out who or what is actually behind it. The "ghost" ends up being the caretaker of the mansion who is also a beekeeper. (The trip to Transylvania was about 9,000 miles from their attic)

2. The Case of the Logical I Ranch (1994)
Pungent smells and weird noises plague the "Logical I Ranch". Some employees of the ranch think it is being caused by a dragon running loose. (The trip to Dead Gulch USA was about 1,372 miles from their attic)

3. The Case of the Sea World Adventure (1995)
The girls' parents work at Sea World as over-worked dolphin trainers. One day, the girls run into a dead body in the woods that eventually leads them and their parents to a cruise ship while trying to solve the rigged mystery. The boss of the girls' parents had planted evidence to get them all on the cruise, so they could take a much-needed family vacation.

4. The Case of the Mystery Cruise (1995)
The sequel to The Case of the Sea World Adventure. Mary-Kate and Ashley's father has a laptop containing vital information. It gets stolen while on a cruise ship and must be retrieved. The twins believe a friend of their father's was responsible, but it later turned out to be a staged occurrence.

5. The Case of the Fun House Mystery (1995)
Something is making scary noises inside the fun house at an amusement park, and the girls must figure out who or what it is. Using the clue of "Monster Mush" and "bananas", they find out the monster lurking inside the fun house is really an orangutan. (The trip to Tons-Of-Fun was about 1,379 miles from their attic)

6. The Case of the Christmas Caper (1995)
Hackers break into Santa's computer to steal the "Spirit of Christmas", the plane Santa uses to fly to deliver all the presents to the children of the world on Christmas Eve. It is up to girls to show what the holiday is all about. (The trip to North Pole Drive was about 1,000 miles from their attic)

7. The Case of the U.S. Space Camp Mission (1996)
A space shuttle has been grounded, due to a mysterious tapping sound coming from its outer surface. Unless the girls can figure out what is going on, the space shuttle will be not be able to lift-off. To figure out the mystery, they get help learning about space travel through the U.S. Space Camp program. The tapping is revealed to be caused by woodpeckers (The trip to Huntsville was about 1,643 miles from their attic).

8. The Case of the Shark Encounter (1996)
Three pirates claim that the sharks at a Sea World exhibit are singing, and the girls must figure out where the strange sounds are coming from. (The trip to Orlando was about 2,500 miles from their attic)

9. The Case of the Hotel Who-Done-It (1996)
The girls travel to Hawaii, where they meet a hotel manager who has been dealing with a string of recent disappearances around the hotel. (The trip to Hawaii was about 2,556 miles from their attic)

10. The Case of the Volcano Mystery (1997)
The girls receive a call from some miners of marshmallows that a snowball-throwing monster has been "terrorizing" them. The girls eventually find out that the "snow" is really ash, and the "monster" is actually a geologist warning them that an active volcano is not a safe place to work. (The trip to Jelly Island was about 1,759 miles from their attic)

11. The Case of the United States Navy Adventure (1997)
Unidentified flying objects have been seen flying overhead. In this case, the girls get help from the United States Navy to solve the mystery. The "UFOs" ended up being a satellite that was flying too low in orbit. (The trip to The Edge of the World was about 3,528 miles from their attic)

== Compilation releases ==
Other than the eleven episodes, there were three compilation videos made.

The Amazing Adventures of Mary-Kate & Ashley

Includes The Case of the SeaWorld Adventure, The Case of the U.S. Space Camp Mission, and The Case of the Hotel Who-Done-It.

The Favorite Adventures of Mary-Kate & Ashley

Includes The Case of the Volcano Mystery, The Case of the Fun House Mystery, and The Case of the Logical I Ranch.

Mary-Kate and Ashley's Christmas Collection

Includes You're Invited to Mary-Kate and Ashley's Christmas Party, The Case of the Christmas Caper, and The Case of the Mystery Cruise.
