= Africa: Open for Business =

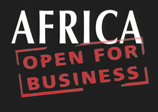
- Film logo
- Directed by: Carol Pineau
- Produced by: Carol Pineau
- Release date: 2005
- Running time: 58 minutes
- Countries: United Kingdom; United States
- Language: English

Africa Open for Business is a documentary by producer, director, and journalist Carol Pineau. It was one of the six BBC Documentaries of the Year 2006 and won a CINE Golden Eagle Award. Highlighting ten stories of local African entrepreneurial businesses, Africa shows the true stories of pioneering companies in challenging economies.

Countries portrayed in the film include Nigeria, Ghana, Senegal, Botswana, Uganda, Zambia, the Democratic Republic of the Congo, and more. In detailing the successes found in these nations, Pineau divests her viewer from the common misconceptions and myths of the Africa seen in the vast media today. Kofi Annan, Secretary General of the United Nations, said to director Pineau of the film, "Your analysis of the situation in Africa was very perceptive, and much more balanced than one usually finds in articles about the continent".

Pineau received the "African Vision Award" by Agoralumiere at the Cannes Film Festival where Africa: Open for Business was originally screened. It was also broadcast on BBC and PBS in addition to the US-Africa Business Summit in 2005, and has screened at World Economic Forum where Pineau was a plenary speaker, United Nations, US State Department, US Congress, and numerous other high level venues.
