= August 2 (film) =

- Directed by: P V Krishnan
- Written by: P V Krishnan
- Produced by: P V Raman; P V Krishnan
- Starring: Rahul Azad; Sameer Rehman; Joyita Das
- Cinematography: P V Krishnan
- Edited by: P V Krishnan
- Music by: Vinu Manasu, Di Evantile
- Production company: Emotion Sellers Productions Pvt Ltd
- Release date: 21 December 2012
- Running time: 95 minutes
- Country: India
- Language: Hindi

August 2 is an Indian Hindi-language film directed by P V Krishnan. It was claimed to be a true independent mainstream film made within its budget. Producers of the film claims that the film is made on the micro budget of Rs. 300,000. The film had got selected for the Red Carpet Premier in The Indian Independent Film Festival 2013.

== Plot ==
This story is about three different people who are having their own plans for the day, A character called Naveen who had a recent rift with his girlfriend plans to apologize her to bury the hatred between them and get her back and the other characters Jay and his wife Anvitha who were on their way to a marriage will get in trouble with their car in a midway. It is too late by the time they realize that the day had its own plans for them.

== Cast ==
- Rahul Azad
- Joyita Das
- Sameer Rehman
- Raksha

== Music ==
Background of the film was given by the Kannada music composer VinuManasu and Russian electronic music composer Di Evantile

== Awards ==
It got selected for a Red Carpet Premiere for The Indian Independent Film Festival 2013, Bangalore.
