= Aegri Somnia (film) =

- Directed by: James Rewucki
- Written by: James Rewucki
- Produced by: James Rewucki, Mike Sanders, Colin Musulak
- Starring: Tyhr Trubiak, Mel Marginet
- Music by: Dead Air Animal
- Production company: Absurd Machine Films
- Release date: January 3, 2008
- Running time: 90 minutes
- Country: Canada
- Language: English

Aegri Somnia is a 2008 Canadian existential horror film, written and directed by James Rewucki. Shot in a mixture of black and white and colour, Aegri Somnia tells the story of Edgar (Tyhr Trubiak), a simple man who is haunted by the death of his wife Muriel (Mel Marginet) and plagued by shadows and terrifying visions.

== Plot ==
Edgar is a man in an extreme existential crisis. He is thrown into a hopeless abyss of frequent nightmares, isolation and increasing paranoia following the suicide of his wife. Edgar moves from one fresh hell into another in this tale of a man facing the darkest side of his shadow self.

== Cast ==
- Tyhr Trubiak as Edgar
- Mel Marginet as Muriel
- Warren Louis Wiltshire as Virgil
- Nadine Pinette as Krista
- Daryl Dorge as Lance
- Andy Rewucki as Mr. Chris
- Chris Hodgson as Cane
- Ashley Hirt as Ashley
- Warren Ellis as Funeral Director

== Reception ==
Horror News said of the film, "Just because something wants to be art, and works really hard to be worthy, doesn’t mean it’s necessarily going to be artistic and worthy."
