= Abby's List =

2022documentary film by Mark Sutherland

- Theatrical release poster
- Directed by: Mark Sutherland
- Written by: Mark Sutherland
- Produced by: Mark Sutherland
- Starring: Mark Sutherland; Abby; Sophie Cole; Bill Farmer; Jack Hanna; Scott Simpson; Laura Maxwell Murnane; Charlie Van Dyke; Corey Burton
- Cinematography: Mark Sutherland; Sophie Cole; Duane Conder; Sterling Carter
- Edited by: Mark Sutherland
- Music by: Allen DiCenzo; Kenn Kaplan
- Production company: Albert Pictures
- Release dates: 2022 (festival); May 2, 2025 (theatrical); May 23, 2025 (VOD)
- Running time: 89 minutes
- Country: United States
- Language: English
- Budget: $145,000

Abby's List: A Dogumentary is a 2022 American independent documentary film, described as a “Dogumentary,” directed by Mark Sutherland. The unscripted feature follows Sutherland and his dog, Abby, on a cross-country road trip to complete a bucket list of experiences, blending family-friendly adventure, humor, and heartfelt moments. Produced by Albert Pictures, the film was shot in various locations across the United States and Canada beginning in 2016. Abby's List is scheduled for a limited theatrical release in May 2025, having previously screened at film festivals. It has received multiple festival awards, including its first major award, Best Documentary Feature, at the Orlando Film Festival in 2022.

== Plot ==
When 14-year-old Whippet Abby appears to be nearing the end of her life, she and her owner, Mark, set out on a road trip to cross the country while doing "her" bucket list. Whether it's Abby's List or Mark's list is still up for debate. Abby's activities include:

- Captaining a yacht
- Ordering room service at The Mirage in Las Vegas
- Riding It's a Small World at Walt Disney World
- Befriending a dolphin and a deer
- Meeting Bill Farmer, the voice of Goofy, one of the world's most famous dogs
- Peeing on the world's tallest trees in Sequoia National Forest.

Throughout the journey, Mark Sutherland and Abby focus on spending quality time together, having fun, and reflecting on life. Unexpectedly, after a few weeks on the road, Abby's health improves, and their planned three-week trip morphs into a three-year journey of their lives.

== Cast ==
- Mark Sutherland as Himself
- Abby as Herself
- Sophie Cole as Herself
- Bill Farmer as Himself
- Jack Hanna as Himself
- Scott Simpson as Himself
- Laura Maxwell Murnane as Herself
- Charlie Van Dyke as Radio News Anchor voice-over
- Corey Burton as movie trailer voice-over

== Production ==
Abby's List was independently produced by Albert Pictures, with Mark Sutherland serving as director and producer. Sutherland also acted as the primary cinematographer, filming the journey himself. Sutherland raised $145,000 from donors to fund the project. Principal photography took place over three years from 2016 to 2019 across multiple locations in the United States and Canada, including Hermosa Beach, California, Disneyland in California, Grand Canyon in Arizona, Las Vegas, Sequoia National Forest in California, Walt Disney World and SeaWorld Orlando in Florida, the White House, Mount Vernon, Ohio, and Ontario, Canada. Scenes were also filmed on a yacht. Post-production took place at Horizons Companies in Columbus, Ohio, where Sutherland worked with Chris Sheridan and Lily Kate Aulino on editing, sound design, and audio mixing. The original score includes "Abby’s Sweet Farewell" composed by Allen DiCenzo.

== Release ==
Abby's List started its limited theatrical release on May 2, 2025, in 23 AMC Theatres in 16 cities across the United States, finishing after a 3-week run. The film was released on VOD on May 23, 2025, distributed by Freestyle Digital Media. The film previously screened at film festivals, winning:

- Best Documentary Feature – 2022 Orlando Film Festival
- Best Documentary – 2022 Sunscreen Film Festival West
- Best Documentary and Best Dogumentary – 2023 Wild Rivers Film Festival
- Best Feature Documentary – 2023 CineWorld Film Festival
- Official Charity Film – 2022 Melbourne Documentary Film Festival

== Reception ==
NPR’s John DeSando at WCBE called Abby's List a "delightful road trip with universal appeal." The BBC World Service featured the film globally for its heartfelt narrative. The Houston Chronicle praised the emotional bond between Sutherland and Abby. FilmInk Australia called it "A Film’s Best Friend" and included it in its "Ten To Watch" list for the 2022 Melbourne Documentary Film Festival.
