= Action in Slow Motion =

1943 British silent short film

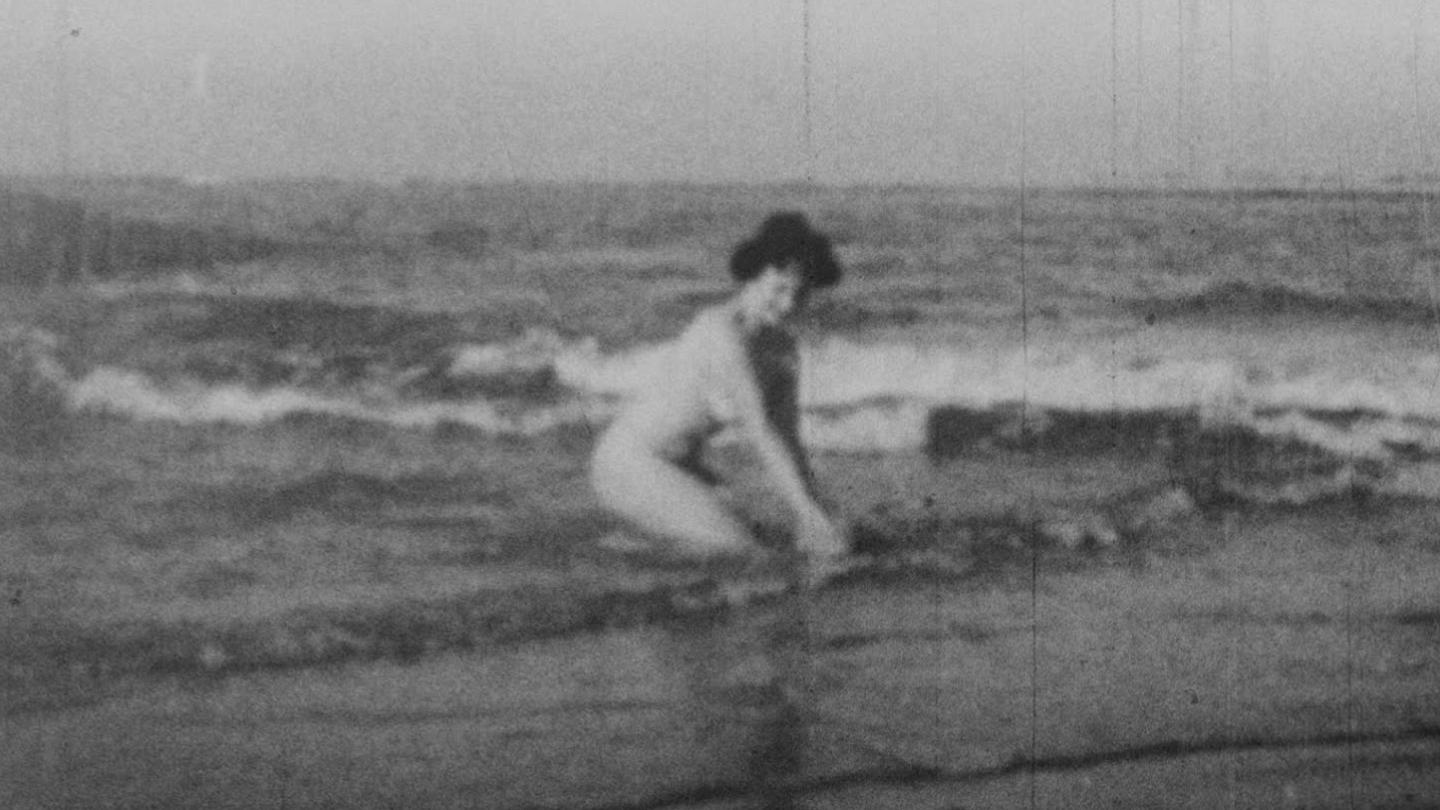
- Still
- Release date: 1943
- Running time: 3 minutes
- Country: United Kingdom

Action in Slow Motion is 1943? British silent short film. Aside from its title frame, the film has no credits, so its author and production information are unknown. The British Film Institute BFIplayer page states that it was "probably shot in the 1940s", while the BFI Collections Search gives 1943."

The only known print of this film was gifted to the BFI, and is notable as an early depiction of full frontal female nudity in British cinema. It was often described as an "art film" to dispute that it was outright pornography.

== Scenario ==
In the film, which runs only three minutes, a young naked woman is depicted frolicking on a beach. The film then shows more of the same, but in slow motion, introduced by a title card reading "A similar action as seen by the slow-motion camera." This format is repeated in two further sequences, first with the woman playing in the surf, and then running across countryside.

A "Certificate of Exhibition" card at the beginning of the film states:

This film has been produced expressly for assistance to Artists and Students and has been sold under a signal Guarantee that it will only be shown to such and any failure to comply with this guarantee will render the Exhibitor or Vendor liable to any penalties imposed by the Authorities.
