= Angels in White =

2012 Israeli religious drama film by Tali Avrahami

- Hebrew: מלאכיות בלבן
- Directed by: Tali Avrahami
- Screenplay by: Tali Avrahami
- Produced by: Tali Avrahami
- Starring: Einav Markel, Yael Porat, Liat Azar,
- Edited by: H. Orenstein
- Release date: 2012
- Running time: 120 minutes
- Country: Israel
- Languages: Hebrew, German, Russian

Angels in White (Hebrew: מלאכיות בלבן, romanized: Mal'akhiyot Be-lavan) is a 2012 Israeli feature film produced and directed by Tali Avrahami.

== Synopsis ==
The story takes place in the women's camp in Nazi Germany Auschwitz concentration camp, in 1945. Haya (Einav Markel) arrives with her daughter Inuchka (Yael Porat). During the selection process, the two are separated, and Haya promises her daughter that she will do anything and everything to make sure they reunite.

In the children's section, Inuchka is terrified of the cruel kapo, Maria (Dana Muszkatblit), and runs away from her. She is found crying by Reysy (Liat Azar), a prisoner who works as a nurse in the infirmary, who takes her to the clinic and tries to hide her there. Another nurse, Shifra (Almog Pa'il), objects to this plan, but the head nurse, Nechama (Liel Danir), convinces Shifra to keep the secret, in exchange for part of her daily food rations.

Reysy is fired from the infirmary when she is discovered trying to organize a Yom Kippur prayer. She goes to work in the sewing workshop, where Haya has also been placed. She is upset when she learns she must work on the Sabbath, but is determined to sew more than her share all the other days so that she can avoid work on Saturday. She is nearly caught not working by a guard, but Haya creates a distraction.

Haya believes her daughter is alive, not fully understanding the meaning of the incinerators in the camp. When one of the prisoners ridicules her for this, and says that she is probably long gone, Haya breaks down, and runs away, towards the electric fence. Reysy prevents her from killing herself. Haya is later sent to work in the officers' library, where she learns the war is nearing its end.

When the allied forces near the camp, the Germans abandon it. Haya wanders about looking for food, and while searching the infirmary, finds the cupboard in which Inuchka is hiding.

== Cast ==
The film's cast includes:

- Haya - Einav Markel
- Inuchka - Yael Porat
- Reysy - Liat Azar
- Nechama - Liel Danir
- Shifra - Almog Pa'il
- Kapo - Dana Muszkatblit

== Production ==
The film was Avrahami's highest budget film, costing over 1 million ILS. It was filmed in Ukraine. Avrahami made the film following requests by teachers and community to have a work depicting Jewish heroism in the Holocaust, but she has called the film the biggest failure of her career: "The pain in the film was apparently too real. The women didn't enjoy it. 'Why did you make us cry during a holiday?' Some had seen films such as Schindler's List, but for them it was very American and distant, while here they got Jewish authenticity before their eyes, and they couldn't take it." After the debut screening, Avrahami ran back to the studio and edited out some of the harsher scenes, but the result did not work, and the film was shelved. According to Avrahami, it was the first of her films that no attempt was made to steal.

== Criticism ==
The movie received criticism from Ultra-Orthodox women who watched it, due to scenes that were considered "too frightening" for the target audience whose preferred genre is telenovelas. After the first screening of the movie, segments were cut according to the women's demands.
