= Americký souboj =

- Directed by: Otakar Stáfl
- Written by: Max Urban
- Starring: Ela Lausmanová
- Cinematography: Max Urban
- Release date: 1 November 1913
- Country: Austria-Hungary
- Languages: Silent; Czech intertitles

Americký souboj is a 1913 Austro-Hungarian comedy film directed by Otakar Štáfl.

== Cast ==
- Ela Laušmanová as Wife's Friend
- Nina Laušmanová as Wife
- Otakar Štáfl as Friend
- Jiří Steimar as Husband
- Max Urban as Friend
