= William Parry (photojournalist) =

British photojournalist

William Parry (born 1969) is a British photojournalist.

Parry is based in London and has lived and worked in the Middle East. He has written for the Washington Review of Middle East Affairs, The Guardian, The Independent, The Middle East, Times Higher Education Supplement, and electronic news organisations Electronic Intifada and New Matilda. In February 2008, Parry went to Bethlehem to write an article about the after effects of Banksy's project "Pictures on Walls" about the Israeli West Bank barrier.

== Books ==
- Against the Wall: The Art of Resistance in Palestine. ISBN 978-0-7453-2917-8.
