= Carol Pineau =

American journalist and producer

- Occupations: Journalist, filmmaker, writer
- Employer(s): Schar School of Policy and Government
- Known for: Reporting on Africa, documentary films
- Notable work: Africa: Open for Business, Africa Investment Horizons, Kenya Stories
- Awards: CINE Golden Eagle Award, African Vision Award

Carol Pineau is an American journalist and producer, writer, and director of documentary films.

== Career ==
Pineau's expertise lies in Africa, with over a decade of reporting experience. She has reported for CNN, BBC, NPR, VOA, Radio France Internationale (RFI) and other major worldwide broadcasters. Her films include Africa: Open for Business, Africa Investment Horizons, and Kenya Stories. She is also the author of multiple articles found around the globe as well as a book.

Africa: Open for Business was Pineau’s first documentary film which she wrote, directed, and produced. It was one of the six BBC Documentaries of the Year in 2006, and won a CINE Golden Eagle Award. Highlighting ten stories of local African entrepreneurial businesses, Africa shows the true stories of pioneering companies in challenging economies. Countries portrayed in the film include Nigeria, Ghana, Senegal, Botswana, Uganda, Zambia, the Democratic Republic of the Congo, and more. In detailing the successes found in these nations, Pineau divests her viewer from the common misconceptions and myths of the Africa seen in the vast media today. In a letter posted on the documentary's website, Kofi Annan, Secretary General of the United Nations, said to Pineau of the film, "Your analysis of the situation in Africa was very perceptive, and much more balanced than one usually finds in articles about the continent."

Pineau received the "African Vision Award" by Agoralumiere at the Cannes Film Festival where Africa: Open for Business was originally screened. It was also broadcast on BBC and PBS in addition to the US-Africa Business Summit in 2005 and has screened at World Economic Forum where Pineau was a plenary speaker, United Nations, US State Department, US Congress, and numerous other high level venues.

After launching at the New York Stock Exchange in April 2008, Africa Investment Horizons was broadcast on PBS stations.

Kenya Stories was a film that originally depicted the potential of young Kenyan entrepreneurs in their pursuit to get investment. Unfortunately the national Kenyan elections that took place during filming caused violent conflict, killing over 1,000 and displacing over 300,000. The film is not yet complete, continuing progress through the nation's struggle and following their progress through this difficult time. Clips of the film have aired on CNN.

== Journalism ==
Pineau's career as a journalist has included assignments all over the world interviewing Heads of States, rebel leaders, and an abundance of other newsmakers throughout major global conflicts. She reported live on CNN from the Eritrean-Ethiopian War, covered the NATO bombings from Belgrade, and on the first national elections in East Timor. She was one of the first reporters allowed in Nigeria after the fall of the dictator in 1998, and reported exclusively from an Eastern-Sudanese secret military base when rebel leaders controlled the area. While living in France, she contributed international stories to RFO (Radio-Television de France Outre-Mer) in addition to hosting African topics on a worldwide radio show "Crossroads" on RFI.

In 2017, Pineau hosted a talk show series titled "Africa and The Trump Administration" which aired on Africa Today TV where she discussed and debated with a panel of experts on the evolving US Africa relationship from both African and American perspectives.

She is the co-host of the podcast Africa Forward, which focus on the infrastructure challenges and opportunities for countries in Africa.
