= Ama'ara: The Song of the Whales =

- Directed by: Sebastian Jobst
- Written by: Sebastian Jobst; Marina Trost
- Produced by: Marina Trost; Sebastian Jobst; Katarina Kezeric; Petra Martin
- Starring: Anne Byrne; Denesa Chan; Marina Trost
- Cinematography: Denesa Chan; Sebastian Jobst; Christoph Heyden
- Edited by: Sebastian Jobst; Katarina Kezeric
- Music by: Marina Trost; Hans von Chelius
- Production companies: Jobst-Filmproduktion; Munakuy Productions
- Release date: May 20, 2021
- Running time: 95 min.
- Country: Germany
- Language: German

Amaara: The Song of the Whales is a 2021 German documentary film directed by Sebastian Jobst.

The world premiere took place on May 20, 2021 at the Illuminate Film Festival in Arizona.

== Synopsis ==
Spiritual singer and healer Marina Trost, through her love for whales and music, demonstrates the connection between people and animals and how fragile this connection and the world as a whole is.

== Cast ==
- Anne Byrne as whale mother
- Denesa Chan as whale cinematographer
- Marina Trost as herself

== Awards ==
- Barcelona Planet Film Festival 2021 Award for Best Soundtrack
- Illuminate Film Festival 2021 Award for Best Film
- Queens World Film Festival 2021: Special Jury Award for the best poetic film
- Award of the Toronto International Women's Film Festival 2021 for the best environmental project

== Production ==
=== Shooting incident ===
It is August 11, 2019, on the last day of shooting, 43-year-old jazz singer Marina Theresia Trost has a fatal accident while diving on the coast of ʻEua in the kingdom of Tonga.
