= Autumn Adagio =

- Directed by: Tsuki Inoue
- Produced by: Tsuki Inoue
- Edited by: Tsuki Inoue
- Music by: Rei Shibakusa
- Release dates: 2009 (Yubari); November 26, 2011 (Japan)
- Running time: 70 minutes
- Country: Japan
- Language: Japanese

Autumn Adagio (不惑のアダージョ, Fuwaku no Adagio) is a 2009 Japanese independent drama film directed by Tsuki Inoue. It was shown at the 2009 Yubari International Fantastic Film Festival, it had its international premiere at the 2010 International Film Festival Rotterdam and it was released in Japan on November 26, 2011.

== Cast ==
- Kazuhiro Nishijima
- Peiton Chiba
- Rei Shibakusa as Sister Maria
- Takumi Shibuya

== Reception ==
The film was in competition for the Tiger Award at the 2010 International Film Festival Rotterdam. On Midnight Eye, Tom Mes said the film "is an understated piece of work, shot predominantly in long takes from fixed camera positions."
