= Abyssal Spider =

Chinese film

- Promotional release poster
- Traditional Chinese: 海霧
- Simplified Chinese: 海雾
- Hanyu Pinyin: Hǎi wù
- Directed by: Joe Chien
- Written by: Joe Chien; Nelson Yan
- Starring: Wang Yangming; Zheng Renshuo; Ko Chia-yen
- Release date: 11 September 2020
- Running time: 107 minutes
- Country: Taiwan

Abyssal Spider (simplified Chinese: 海雾; traditional Chinese: 海霧; pinyin: Hǎi wù; lit. 'Sea Fog'), also known as Mad Spider Sea, is a 2020 Taiwanese monster thriller film directed by Joe Chien. It stars Wang Yangming, Zheng Renshuo, and Ko Chia-yen, and follows the crew of a boat threatened by a dangerous storm and a colossal aquatic spider.

The film was released in Taiwan on 11 September 2020.

== Premise ==
During an attempt to rescue a tanker in a storm, a search and rescue crew witnesses a large shadow beneath the waves and is pulled into the sea. Years later, lone survivor Ajie boards a boat which becomes lost in a storm, and must work together with his fellow crewmates to survive against both the weather and a number of creatures lurking underwater, including a giant aquatic spider.

== Release ==
=== Marketing ===
A trailer for the film was uploaded to YouTube on 19 August 2020. A second trailer was released on 4 September 2020, followed by a third trailer on 24 September.
