= The Age of Love (2014 film) =

- Directed by: Steven Loring
- Produced by: Steven Loring; Senior Creative Consultant, Michelle Ferrari
- Music by: Nathan Halpern
- Release date: April 27, 2014 (Newport Beach International Film Festival)
- Running time: 78 minutes
- Country: United States

The Age of Love is a 2014 feature-length documentary film that follows a group of 70- to 90-year-olds who attend a speed dating event looking for new love and companionship. It explores the question — does the need for intimacy and our search for love change over a lifetime? The film is directed by Steven Loring.

== Synopsis ==
A diverse group of 30 seniors in Rochester, New York participates in an unprecedented speed dating event for people in their 70s, 80s, and 90s. Spurred to take stock of life-worn bodies yet still-hopeful hearts, the seniors reveal emotional needs and desires, attend the event, then head out on dates that result – offering a real-life, first-person look into the true hearts and hopes of our world's booming older population. By allowing typically-overlooked seniors to expose themselves as emotionally-intricate individuals, the film dispels ageist stereotypes, reveals how our need for connection and intimacy endures and is expressed over a lifetime, and presents an unexpected story of new possibility and growth, regardless of age.

== Production notes ==
The Age of Love was filmed in Rochester, New York and premiered at the Newport Beach International Film Festival on April 27, 2014. It marked its international premiere at the Thessaloniki Documentary Festival in March, 2015.

== Reception ==
The Age of Love received widespread critical acclaim. The film has been shown across the United States and screened in countries including England, Russia, Greece, Poland, Denmark, Sweden, New Zealand, Italy, Israel, Canada and Australia. It won the 2013 Paley Center DocPitch Competition in NYC and was awarded a Fledgling Fund grant with which the film's producers have helped organize senior speed dating and speed friendship events in communities worldwide.
