= Against the Wall (2010 film) =

- Directed by: David Capurso
- Written by: Jeff Haber
- Produced by: Jeff Haber
- Starring: Russ Russo; Sarah Ahlgren; Tammy McNeill
- Cinematography: Tim Naylor
- Edited by: Karlyn Michelson
- Music by: John Plenge
- Distributed by: Indie Rights, Go Digital, G4TV
- Release date: April 25, 2010
- Running time: 9 minutes
- Country: United States
- Language: English

Against the Wall is a 2010 science fiction short film directed by David Capurso and written and produced by Jeff Haber. The film stars Russ Russo, Sarah Ahlgren, and Tammy McNeill and is inspired by the Breakout style of video game play. It has a runtime of 9 minutes and was released on April 25, 2010.

== Plot ==
The film centers around a unique narrative that takes cues from the classic arcade game Breakout, featuring dynamic sequences inspired by the game's visual and conceptual elements. The story unfolds in an experimental setting, combining visual effects and narrative driven by game-inspired mechanics.

== Cast ==
- Russ Russo as Adam
- Sarah Ahlgren
- Tammy McNeill

== Reception ==
"Against the Wall" was well-received in the film festival circuit, being accepted into five different film festivals. It was nominated for two Maverick Movie Awards, reflecting its strong impact in independent film circles. Additionally, the film was featured on several online distribution platforms, including iTunes and the G4TV website, helping it gain wider exposure.

== Distribution ==
The film was distributed through multiple online platforms, and it garnered attention from viewers worldwide. It was available for streaming on iTunes and featured on the G4TV website, further solidifying its reach in the independent film scene.
