= List of Kira Kira Happy Hirake! Cocotama characters =

This is the list of characters appearing in the anime Kira Kira Happy Hirake! Cocotama.

== Main characters ==
Haruka Hoshinogawa (星ノ川 はるか, Hoshinogawa Haruka)
Voiced by: Minami Takahashi

The main protagonist of "Hirake! Cocotama", she is a 5th grade student who live in the town of Sakura Town. Very hard working and creative, she is also very friendly to people especially to her friends at school. However, she doesn't excel well in studying. Since her childhood, she admired her grandfather and the cherry blossom tree that was planted on his Antique Shop. However, when her grandfather decided to take a trip overseas, he entrusted to her the care of the Antique shop. It was that time that she met Ribbon and received the Key of Wonders, making her the Legendary Cocotama Contractor. As both the contractor and new owner of the antique store, she tries her best to keep her friends happy while doing her duties to discover the secrets revolving the shop and the strange picture linking to the Key of Wonders.

== Cocotamas ==
The Cocotamas of Hirake! share the same origin from the first and were similar to the first series. Unlike the first series, Cocotamas has no human contractors. Instead, a "Legendary Cocotama Contractor" (伝説のここたま契約者, Densetsu no Kokotama Keiyaku-sha) is chosen to fulfill its roles on watching over the Cocotamas. The "Key of Wonders" (フシギなカギ, Fushigi na Kagi) was made to be a mark of the Legendary Contractor, which also serves as a device to unlock special buildings for the Cocotamas.

=== Cocotama Contracted to Haruka ===
Ribbon (リボン, Ribon)
Voiced by: Inori Minase

The secondary main protagonist of "Hirake! Cocotama", she is a pink Rabbit and a legendary Cocotama born from Haruka's cherry blossom ribbon when she was a child and is referred as the "Ribbon Goddess". Happy go lucky and yet also kind and energetic, she embodies some of Haruka's personalities and resourcefulness, yet she is not that smart. She is also very caring regarding her human partner, and always supports her in everything they do. Unlike any other Cocotamas, her Hiding Egg takes the form of the Key of Wonders after she met Haruka for the first time, and has no means of hiding herself. But Haruka made her a compact that allows her to hide from humans when Haruka is going out. Her magic revolves around smiles, yet not as precise as she wanted it to be. Her full title is "Nico Nico no Sakura Ribbon no Mikoto" (ニコニコの桜リボンのみこと, Niko Niko no Sakura Ribon no Mikoto).

Pillow (ピロー, Pirō)
Voiced by: Mariya Ise

Pillow is a light blue and white Panda Cocotama born from Haruka's pillow and is referred as the "Pillow God". Unlike Ribbon, he is very timid, lazy and laid back but also is very determined despite the troubles they faced. He is also very soft-spoken. Due to his lazy nature, he usually falls asleep every time, which makes someone wake him up especially on desperate situations. His magic revolves around dreams, and that his lullaby combined with the Cocotama Hotel's magic can revitalize him and his friends. His full title is "Gu Gu Gu no Suya Suya Pi no Mikoto" (グーグーグーのスヤスヤピーのみこと, Gūgūgū no Suya Suya Pī no Mikoto).

Chaco (ちゃこ, Chako)
Voiced by: Emiri Iwai

Chaco is a yellow Cat Cocotama born from one of Haruka's teacups she always uses, and is referred as the "Cup Goddess". She is very shy and also soft-spoken but also can be a bit rowdy and rough when been disturbed a lot. She is also happens to be a big eater, and also like to drink tea at times. In later episodes, she became a waitress in Pantonio's restaurant but usually can't control her own appetite. Her magic revolves around food. Her full title is "Cha Cha Cha Gokuto Itakadakimasu no Mikoto" (ちゃちゃちゃごくっといただけますのみこと, Cha Cha Cha Gokutto Itadakemasu no Mikoto).

Ruby (ルビー, Rubī)
Voiced by: Yū Shimamura

Ruby is a purple Squirrel Cocotama born from a Ruby Ring, and is referred as the "Ring Goddess". She was born in the shop a year before Haruka became a Legendary Contractor and is watching over her and her actions. She later formally introduced herself to Haruka and her Cocotama friends and decided to live with them. She is very gentle and also beautiful, sometimes obsessing with beautiful looks. She is also good at the piano too. Ruby also own Cocotama Shop back in Antique Sakura. When in disguise, she refers herself as "Ruby Karat" to phantom thief on the group and clean all of dirt. Her own magic revolves around beauty and style. Her full title is "Kyu Kyu to Pika Pika Ring no Mikoto" (キュキュッとぴかぴかリングのみこと, Kyu Kyu to Pika Pika Ringu no Mikoto).

Marme (マルメ, Marume)
Voiced by: Aki Toyosaki

Marme is a green Owl Cocotama born from a pair of glasses and is referred as the "Glasses God". He is very smart and also logical in his own thinking, yet also has a very soft spot and his speeches ends in "~hoho". He is also a good researcher regarding the mysteries regarding the wilting Sakura Tree and Sakuramachi itself and how it is linked to Haruka. Though he is good in brains, he is not good at sports or any other physical activity. His magic has a very varied chance of success, and is related to logic and knowledge. His full title is "Hirameki Kirameki Marumaru Megane de Kaiketsu Shite Miseru Maru no Mikoto" (ひらめききらめきまるまるメガネで解決してみせる丸のみこと, Hirameki Kirameki Marumaru Megane de Kaiketsu Shite Miseru Maru no Mikoto).

Pantonio (パントニオ, Pantonio)
Voiced by: Nobuaki Kanemitsu

Pantonio is a tan Lion Cocotama born from a frying pan in a restaurant in Sakuramachi, and is referred as the "Frying Pan God". He is very helpful in the restaurant he was born in, though doing it in secret and is both kind and very resourceful. He is also a skilled chef, with his own skills used to cook very good dishes for his friends and does all of them splendidly. Pantonio also owns the Cocotama Restaurant back in Antique Sakura. His own magic revolves around cooking, though he rarely uses them and more uses his own cooking skills. His full title is "Pan Pan Pan to Kurutto Pan no Mikoto" (パンパンパーンとクルっとパーンのみこと, Panpanpān to Kurutto pān no Mikoto).

Ojou (おジョウ, Ojō)
Voiced by: Yumi Kakazu

Ojou is a light yellow Bee Cocotama born from a watering can in a garden up the mountains and is referred as the "Watering Can Goddess". Living in the high mountains, she is very good worker and gardener, often very soft-spoken and kind, yet cries easily. Her speeches ends with "~da jo". She also can understand animals well, likes to sleep in the ground and rarely comes down from the mountain to visit Haruka and her friends in the Antique Shop until she has decided to stay Cocotama Castle's as a gardener. Her own magic revolves around gardening. Her full title is "Joro de Jotto Sukusuku Pakka no Mikoto" (ジョろてジョットすくすくぱっかのみこと, Joro de Jotto Sukusuku Pakka no Mikoto).

Doku-Doctor (ドクドクター, Dokudokutā)
Voiced by: Shinya Hamazoe

Doku-Doctor is a pink and white Chicken Cocotama who was born from a stethoscope and referred as the "Stethoscope God". He himself came from the southern islands in Japan and is considered to have a calm and yet cool personality. Doku-Doctor is also very good on taking care of children, and can be very friendly at times, as shown to his interactions to Tsu, Mi and Ki. Though being cool, he is also a good fan of Hard Rock and likes to rock out with Nachu, sometimes and both fans of a rock band. After he came to Antique Sakura, he became the Cocotama Town's local doctor, setting up his own clinic there alongside Nachu as his assistant nurse. His full title is "Doku Doku Waku Waku Chou Rokku Daze no Mikoto" (ドクドクワクワクちょロックだぜのみこと, Doku Doku Waku Waku Chō Rokku Daze no Mikoto).

Nachu (ナーチュ, Nāchu)
Voiced by: Rikako Aikawa

Nachu is a light blue Deer Cocotama who was born form a syringe and referred as the "Syringe Goddess". Hailing from the northern area of Japan, she is very stoic and very stern. However underneath her serious personality, it can change into a more excited and sometimes worried personality. She is also a huge fan of hard rock and likes to rock out with Doku-Doctor, sometimes and both fans of a rock band. On her more excited personality, she likes to be with children too, yet Tsu, Mi and Ki aren't fond of her. After she came to Antique Sakura, she became the Cocotama Town's nurse, later becoming a doctor like Doku-Doctor. She also starting to learn to be a parent. Her full title is "Chuutto Genki o Chuunyuu Shimasu no Mikoto" (チューっと元気を注入しますのみこと, Chūtto Genki o Chūnyū Shimasu no Mikoto).

Tsu (ツー, Tsū), Mi (ミー, Mī) and Ki (キー, -Kī)
Voiced by: Ayaka Nanase

Tsu, Mi and Ki were a group of baby Penguin Cocotamas, born from toy blocks and referred as the "Toy block Gods". Both triplets had different personalities, Tsu likes to laugh, Mi cries sometimes, and Ki can get angry sometimes. The triples were all fond of Doku-Doctor like a parent, but is not fond of Nachu.

Rannin (らんにん, Rannin)
Voiced by: Yūki Kodaira

Rannin is a red Mouse Cocotama who was born from a pair of sneakers and referred as the "Sneakers God". Known as the Ninja Cocotama, Rannin has a very outgoing personality and is also very active and bright. He is also very good in Ninjitsu Skills, though some of them fail time to time. Due to his running speed and very active personality, he was assigned to be the driver of the Cocotama Bus, a makeshift bus created from the mini luggage Haruka has received using the Key of Wonders. With his running skills, can actually speed up the vehicle by using the running wheel on the bottom rear end of the bus. His full title is "Ran Ran Nin to Hashiru de Gozaru no Mikoto" (らんらんにんとはしるでござるのみこと, Ran Ran Nin to Hashiru de Gozaru no Mikoto).

Amelie (アメリ, Ameri)
Voiced by: Rina Hidaka

Amelie is a green Peacock Cocotama who was born from an umbrella and referred as the "Umbrella Goddess".

Getchom (ゲッチョム, Getchomu)
Voiced by: Rio Minamoto

Getchom is a purple Bear Cocotama who was born from an Arcade game and is referred to as the "Arcade Game God". He came from Aozora Town since Aozora Land was completely gone.

Patrol (パトル, Patoru)
Voiced by: Megumi Urawa

Patrol is a blue Dog Cocotama who was born from a police car and referred as the "Police Car God". He is a police Cocotama who is after Tuxy and Dreesy for stealing Happy Stars. Later, he appear on Sakura Town to chase after Tuxy and Dreesy and decided to stay in Cocotama Town as a security guard to prevent Tuxy and Dreesy from take over all of the town. His full title is "Pattoto no Anzen Wo Mamoru no Mikoto" (パトっと安全を守るパトのみこと, Pattoto no Anzen Wo Mamoru no Mikoto).

Tia (ティア, Tia)
Voiced by: Ayaka Nanase

Tia is a Cocotama who was born from a Tiara and is referred as the "Tiara Goddess".

Main (マイン, Main)
Voiced by: Mai Aizawa

Main is a Cocotama who was born from a microphone and is referred as the "Microphone Goddess". She is an idol Cocotama.

Scope (スコープ, Sukōpu)
Voiced by: Kokoro Kikuchi

Scope is a green Hedgehog Cocotama who was born from telescope and referred as the "Telescope God". His full title is "Hoshi ni Michibikareshi Zoom de Hakken Scope no Mikoto" (星に導かれしズームで発見スコープのみこと, Hoshi ni Michibikareshi Zoom de Hakken Scope no Mikoto).

Nicky (ニッキー, Nikkī)
Voiced by: Aya Endō

Nicky is a Cocotama who was born from a diary and referred as the "Diary Goddess". She came from 300 years from the future to help Ribbon and the others.

Pashari (パシャリ, Pashari)
Voiced by: Aki Kanada

Pashari is a purple feline Cocotama who was born from a Camera and referred as the "Camera Goddess".

Penne (ペンネ, Penne)
Voiced by: Ayaka Nanase

Penne is a blue Cat Cocotama who is born from a fountain pen and referred as the "Fountain Pen God". He and Pipopa has left Sakura Town to Aozora Town 5 years ago but he and Pipopa returned to this town due to the Legendary Cocotama Contractor appearing and able to use magic.

Pipopa (ピポパ, Pipopa)
Voiced by: Mukai Live

Pipopa is a pink Cow Cocotama who is born from a Telephone and is referred as the "Telephone Goddess". She and Penne has left Sakura Town to Aozora Town 5 years ago but she and Penne are back to this town due to the Legendary Cocotama Contractor has appearing and able to use magic.

Sebastian (セバスチャン, Sebasuchan)
Voiced by: Shinji Kawada

Sebastian is a white Sheep Cocotama who was born from a clock and referred as the "Clock God". He is Tia's maid.

Tuxy (タキッシー, Takisshī) and Dreesy (ドレッシー, Doresshī)
Voiced by: Asami Sanada (Tuxy), Ryōka Yuzuki (Dreesy)

Tuxy and Dressy are a pair of Bat Cocotamas who are Happy Star thieves on the run and a former rival to Ribbon and the others. Tuxy is a male blue Cocotama who was born from an abandoned Tuxedo and referred as the "Tuxedo God", while Dreesy is a female red Cocotama who was born from an abandoned dress and referred as the "Dress Goddess". Both of them are very cunning and vile, also good on playing tricks with everyone. The difference is Tuxy is more of an introvert with some tendencies to be shy at times while Dreesy is more outgoing and very dominating in her actions, sometimes coaxing Tuxy on her plans.

=== Other Cocotamas ===
Kagi-Sennin (カギ仙人, Kagi sennin)
Voiced by: Kōichi Tōchika

Kagi-Sennin is one of the leaders of the Cocotamas.

Symphony (シンフォニー, Shinfonī)
Voiced by: Hitomi Nabatame

Symphony is a white rainbow Horse Cocotama who was born from a music box now known as Cocotama Castle and referred as the "Music Box Goddess".

Poisasso (ポワソ, Powaso)
Voiced by: Aki Toyosaki

Poisasso is a purple Tapir Cocotama who was born from a nightlight now known as Cocotama Hotel and referred as the "Nightlight Goddess".

Ketti (ケティ, Keti)
Voiced by: Ayaka Nanase

Ketti is a pink Tiger Cocotama who was born from a teapot now known as Cocotama Restaurant and referred as the "Teapot Goddess".

Kirara (キララ, Kirara)
Voiced by: Yurie Mikami

Kirara is a lavender Peacock Cocotama who was born from a jewel box now known as Cocotama Shop and referred as the "Jewel Box Goddess".

Tulabelius (ツラベリウス, Tsuraberiusu)
Voiced by: Mukai Live

Tulabelius is a blue Cat Cocotama who was born from a Book now known as Cocotama Clinic and referred as the "Book God".

Journey (ジャーニー, Jānī)
Voiced by: Yū Shimamura

Journey is a blue Imp Cocotama who was born from a suitcase now known as Cocotama Bus and referred to as the "Suitcase God".

Cutin (カッチン, Katchin)
Voiced by: Reina Aoyama

Cutin is an orange Squirrel Cocotama who was born from a clock now known as Cocotama Land and referred as the "Clock God".

Luckytama (ラキたま, Rakitama)
Voiced by: Megumi Han

Returning from Kamisama Minarai: Himitsu no Cocotama, he is an Orange Cocotama born from Kokoro Yotsuba's color pencil that she owned when she was 3 and is referred as the "Colored Pencil God". Kagi-Sennin has tell him to Sakura Town to defeat Minus Power.

Melory (メロリー, Merorī)
Voiced by: Aki Toyosaki

Also returning from Kamisama Minarai: Himitsu no Cocotama, she is a Pink Cocotama born from Kokoro Yotsuba's Piano that she played when she was 3 and is referred as the "Piano Goddess". Kagi-Sennin tell her to Sakura Town in order to defeat Minus Power.

Oshaki (おシャキ, Oshaki)
Voiced by: Yumi Kakazu

Also returning from Kamisama Minarai: Himitsu no Cocotama, Oshaki is a Light Blue Cocotama born from one of the Encyclopedia Book Kokoro Yotsuba's father owns and is referred as the "Book Goddess". Kagi-Sennin tell her to Sakura Town in order to defeat Minus Power.

Geracho (ゲラチョ, Geratcho)
Voiced by: Rikako Aikawa

Also returning from Kamisama Minarai: Himitsu no Cocotama, Geracho is a Green Cocotama born from the Yotsuba's family's flat screen Television and is referred as the "Television God". Kagi-Sennin tell him to Sakura Town in order to defeat Minus Power.

Kirarise (キラリス, Kirarisu)
Voiced by: Ryōka Yuzuki

Also returning from Kamisama Minarai: Himitsu no Cocotama, Kirarise is a Mauve Cocotama born from Misato Yotsuba's treasured Lipstick given to her by Koichi and is referred as the "Lipstick Goddess". Kagi-Sennin tell her to Sakura Town in order to defeat Minus Power.

Mogutan (モグタン)
Voiced by: Michiyo Murase

Also returning from Kamisama Minarai: Himitsu no Cocotama, Mogutan is a large Yellow Cocotama born from a fork that belonged and used by the Yotsuba Family and is referred as the "Fork God". Kagi-Sennin tell him to Sakura Town to defeat Minus Power.

Sarine (サリーヌ, Sarīnu) and Parine (パリーヌ, Parīnu)
Voiced by: Ayumi Fujimura (Sarine) and Yuri Shiratori (Parine)

Also returning from Kamisama Minarai: Himitsu no Cocotama, Sarine and Parine are twin Cocotamas both born from the rinse-in shampoo bottle the Yotsubas use and they were referred to as the "Shampoo Gods". Kagi-Sennin tell both of them to Sakura Town to defeat Minus Power.

Mishil (ミシル, Mishiru)
Voiced by: Fumiko Orikasa

Also returning from Kamisama Minarai: Himitsu no Cocotama, Mishil is a Red Cocotama born from the Yotsuba Family's mailbox and is referred as the "Mail Goddess". Kagi-Sennin tell her to Sakura Town to defeat Minus Power.

== Other characters ==
=== Hoshinogawa Family ===
Midori Hoshinogawa (星ノ川 みどり, Hoshinogawa Midori)
Voiced by: Ryōka Yuzuki

Haruka's mother.

Chu Hoshinogawa (星ノ川 宙, Hoshinogawa Chū)
Voiced by: Shinji Kawada

Haruka's father.

Ginzo Hoshinogawa (星ノ川 銀造, Hoshinogawa Ginzo)
Voiced by: Keiichi Sonobe

Haruka's Grandfather, who once gave her the Cherry Blossom hairpin when she was a child. The original owner of the Antique Shop "Antique Sakura", he once watched over the Cherry Blossom tree that was planted there until its sudden decline in health. He entrusted Haruka to take care of the shop while he's abroad exploring the world.

=== Sakura Town First Elementary School ===
Aoi Hidaka (日高 あおい, Hidaka Aoi)
Voiced by: Mukai Live

Haruka's friend.

Miku Mochizuki (望月 みく, Mochizuki Miku)
Voiced by: Ayaka Nanase

Haruka's friend who always watches anime.

=== Others ===
Nobuko Kageura (影浦 信子, Kageura Nobuko)
Voiced by: Michiko Neya

A fortune teller who is a frequent customer of Antique Sakura. She is watching over the mysterious happenings regarding the shop and is focused on Haruka.
