= List of Kamisama Minarai: Himitsu no Cocotama episodes =

- No. of episodes: 139

Release
- Original network: TXN (TV Tokyo, TV Osaka)
- Original release: October 1, 2015 – August 30, 2018

Series chronology
- Next → Kira Kira Happy Hirake! Cocotama

The following is a list of episodes of the anime television series Kamisama Minarai: Himitsu no Cocotama (Japanese: かみさまみならい ヒミツのここたま, Hepburn: Kamisama Minarai: Himitsu no Kokotama; Secret Apprentice Gods: Cocotama's Secrets), based on the Cocotama House Series of toys created by Bandai Namco Holdings. The series is directed by Norio Nitta and written by Michihiro Tsuchiya with character designs by Shinobu Ōkawa. The series began airing on all TXN stations in Japan from October 1, 2015, to June 28, 2018 – replacing Tamagotchi! on its initial timeslot. It was succeeded by the second series and spin-off, Kira Kira Happy Hirake! Cocotama.

The music for the series is composed by Ryosuke Nakanishi. The opening theme from episodes 1 until 76 is "Coro Coro Cocotama!" (ころころここたま!, Korokoro Kokotama!; "Roly-Poly Cocotama!") and from episode 77 until 126 is "Cocotama Happy Paradise!" (ここたまハッピ～パラダイス!, Kokotama Happi Paradaisu!), both performed by Erika. Beginning with episode 127, the opening theme is "Coro Coro Cocotama! Naka Naka Nakayoshi Version" (ころころここたま!～なかなかなかよしバージョン～, Korokoro Kokotama! Nakanaka Nakayoshi Bājon; "Roly-Poly Cocotama! Naka Naka Friends Version") by Kaede Hondo and Megumi Han. The first ending theme is "Kokon Poipoi Cocotama!" (ここんぽいぽいここったま!, Kokon Poipoi Kokottama!) by Aki Toyosaki featuring Megumi Han, Yumi Kakazu, Ryoka Yuzuki, Rikako Aikawa, and Michiyo Murase. The second ending theme is "Kokoro Daisuki Cocotama!" (こころだいすきここったま!, Kokoro Daisuki kokotama!; "I Love Cocotama With Hearts!") by Kaede Hondo and Megumi Han; the third ending theme is "Utao ♪ Cocota-March!" (うたおう♪ここったまーち!, Utaou ♪ Kokottamachi!; "Let's Sing! Cocota-March!") by Kaede Hondo featuring Megumi Han, Aki Toyosaki, Yumi Kakazu, Ryoka Yuzuki, Rikako Aikawa, Michiyo Murase, Ayumi Fujimura, Yuri Shiratori, Fumiko Orikasa and Ayaka Nanase; the fourth ending theme is "Ikou yo! Cocotama-kai!!" (いこうよ!ここたま界!!, Ikou yo! Kokotama-kai!!; "Let's Go! Cocotama World!!") by Megumi Han, Aki Toyosaki and Saki Fujita.

== Episode list ==
=== Arc 1 ===
==== First Part ====
No.	Title	Original release date
1	"Birth! Little God / Kokoro, Builds a House!?"; Transliteration: "Tanjō! Chīsana Kamisama / Kokoro, Ie o tateru!?" (Japanese: 誕生！小さな神様 / こころ、家をたてる！？)	October 1, 2015
2	"The Piano Goddess, Melory / Cocotama Housecleaning!"; Transliteration: "Piano no Kamisama, Merorī-nano / Kokotama no ōsōji!" (Japanese: ピアノの神様、メロリーなの♪ / ここたまの大そうじ！)	October 8, 2015
3	"The Cocotamas goes to School / The Rabbit God"; Transliteration: "Kokotama Gakkō e Iku / Usagi no Kamisama" (Japanese: ここたま学校へ行く / ウサギの神さま)	October 15, 2015
4	"Big Pinch! Oshaki Can't Come Out!!"; Transliteration: "Dai Pinchi! Deru ni Derare nu Oshaki desu!!" (Japanese: 大ピンチ！出るに出られぬおシャキです！！)	October 22, 2015
5	"The Laughing God? Geracho-datcho!"; Transliteration: "Warai no Kami? Geratcho-datcho!" (Japanese: 笑いの神？ゲラチョだっちょ！)	October 29, 2015
6	"An Exciting Great Camping Adventure!?"; Transliteration: "Waku-waku Ensoku Daibōken!?" (Japanese: わくわく遠足大冒険！？)	November 5, 2015
7	"The Sexy Cocotama Kirarise / Good Luck, Mom!"; Transliteration: "Sekushī Kokotama ♡ Kirarisu / Ganbare! Okāsan" (Japanese: セクシーここたま♡キラリス / がんばれ！おかあさん)	November 12, 2015
8	"SOS!? Mogutan Appears"; Transliteration: "SOS!? Mogutan Arawaru" (Japanese: SOS！？モグタンあらわる)	November 19, 2015
9	"Decisive Futsal Match!"; Transliteration: "Futtosaru de Shinken Shōbu!" (Japanese: フットサルで真剣勝負！)	November 26, 2015
10	"Look for the Tama-Sennin! / Tama-Sennin's Game!"; Transliteration: "Sagase! Tama-Sen'nin / Shōbu da! Tama-Sen'nin" (Japanese: 探せ！たませんにん / 勝負だ！たませんにん)	December 3, 2015
11	"Candy Shop Babanban!"; Transliteration: "Dagashiya-san de Babanban!" (Japanese: 駄菓子屋さんでババンバン！)	December 10, 2015
12	"Goodbye, Cocotama House"; Transliteration: "Sayonara, Kokotama Hausu" (Japanese: さよなら、ここたまハウス)	December 17, 2015
13	"Kokoro's Heart-Pounding Christmas / The Cocotama's Suspenseful Christmas"; Transliteration: "Kokoro no Dokidoki Kurisumasu / Kokotama no Harahara Kurisumasu" (Japanese: こころのドキドキクリスマス / ここたまのハラハラクリスマス)	December 24, 2015
14	"The Cocotama Twins' Splashing Appearance! / Sarine and Parine's Secret"; Transliteration: "Awatto Tōjō! Futago no Kokotama / Sarīnu to Parīnu no Himitsu" (Japanese: アワッと登場！双子のここたま / サリーヌとパリーヌの秘密)	January 7, 2016
15	"Sorry for Waiting! My Name is Mishil!! / The Mysterious Spy! Codename 346"; Transliteration: "Omatase! Atachi ga Mishiru!! / Nazo no Supai! Kōdonēmu 346" (Japanese: おまたせ！あたちがミシル！！ / 謎のスパイ！コードネーム346)	January 14, 2016
16	"Expanding the Cocotama House! / The Great Postal Service Pursuit!"; Transliteration: "Hirogare! Kokotama Hausu/ Yūbin Dai Tsuiseki!" (Japanese: 広がれ！ここたまハウス / ゆうびん大追跡！)	January 21, 2016
17	"Kokoro's Secret"; Transliteration: "Kokoro no Himitsu" (Japanese: こころのヒミツ)	January 28, 2016
18	"Oni! Beans! Setsubun! / Snow Surprise! A Snowy World"; Transliteration: "Oni da! Mame da! Setsubun da! / Yuki ni Bikkuri! Ginsekai" (Japanese: 鬼だ！豆だ！節分だ！ / 雪にビックリ！銀世界)	February 4, 2016
19	"The Big Valentine Operation!"; Transliteration: "Barentain Dai Sakusen!" (Japanese: バレンタイン大作戦！)	February 11, 2016
20	"The Straytama Trio Arrives!"; Transliteration: "Sanjō! Noratama Torio" (Japanese: 参上！ノラたまトリオ)	February 18, 2016
21	"Mom Gets Angry / Not Again! The Straytama Trio"; Transliteration: "Okāsan, ōini okoru / Matamata! Noratama Torio" (Japanese: お母さん、大いに怒る / またまた！ノラたまトリオ)	February 25, 2016
22	"Hina and the Ohina Doll"; Transliteration: "Hina tō Ohina-sama" (Japanese: ひなとお雛さま)	March 3, 2016
23	"Aim to be an Idol!"; Transliteration: "Mezase Aidoru!" (Japanese: めざせアイドル！)	March 10, 2016
24	"Oshaki Moves Out / Behind the Drawer"; Transliteration: "Oshaki, Hikkoshimasu / Hikidashi no Naka" (Japanese: おシャキ、引っ越します / ひきだしのなか)	March 17, 2016
25	"Geracho's Training!? / Let's All Touch Amanda!"; Transliteration: "Geracho no Kamisama Shugyō!? / Amanda to Kyū Sekkin!" (Japanese: ゲラチョの神さま修行！？ / アマンダと急接近！)	March 24, 2016
26	"Another Contractor"; Transliteration: "Mō Hitori no Keiyaku-sha" (Japanese: もう一人の契約者)	March 31, 2016

==== Second Part ====
No.	Title	Original release date
27	"Happy Hunter Nozomi & Vivit"; Transliteration: "Happī Hantā Nozomi & Bibitto" (Japanese: ハッピーハンター のぞみ&ビビット)	April 7, 2016
28	"The Cocotama Contract Renewal!? / Supermarket Paradise-Daguu!"; Transliteration: "Kokotama no Keiyaku Kōshin!? / Sūpā wa Paradaisu Daguu!" (Japanese: ここたまの契約更新！？ / スーパーはパラダイスだぐぅ！)	April 14, 2016
29	"Onward! Terepon Shopping!! / Run, Amanda!"; Transliteration: "Totsugeki! Tereponshoppingu!! / Hashire Amanda" (Japanese: 突撃！テレポンショッピング！！ / 走れアマンダ)	April 21, 2016
30	"Pinko and Renge Were Born Here!"; Transliteration: "Pinko to Renji, koko de umaremashita!" (Japanese: ピンコとレンジ、ここで生まれました！)	April 28, 2016
31	"Fly to the Sky, Cocotama / Mother's Day Operation!"; Transliteration: "Kokotama, Sora wo tobu / Haha no Hi Daisakusen!" (Japanese: ここたま、空を飛ぶ / 母の日大作戦！)	May 6, 2016
32	"Aim for the First Place!!"; Transliteration: "Mezase! Ichitōshō!!" (Japanese: めざせ！一等賞！！)	May 13, 2016
33	"The "Luck" in Fortune-Telling!? / Kokoro Becomes a Gaming God!?"; Transliteration: "Uranai de Rakkī nano!? / Kokoro, Gēmu no Kamisama ni naru!?" (Japanese: うらないでラッキーなの！？ / こころ、ゲームの神様になる！？)	May 19, 2016
34	"Mishil's Crucial Moment! / Ichinose's Many Secrets"; Transliteration: "Mishiru Kiki Ippatsu! / Ichinose-kun no Tondemo Shīkuretto" (Japanese: ミシル危機一髪！ / 一之瀬君のトンでもシークレット)	May 26, 2016
35	"Catch a UFO!"; Transliteration: "UFO o Tsukamaero!" (Japanese: UFOをつかまえろ！)	June 2, 2016
36	"Wet in the Rain♪ Cocotama House / Hungry! Straytama Trio"; Transliteration: "Ame de runrun ♪ kokotama hausu / Harapeko! Noratama torio" (Japanese: 雨でルンルン♪ここたまハウス / はらぺこ！ノラたまトリオ)	June 9, 2016
37	"Geracho has a Disciple!? / Akane Comes in" Transliteration: "Geracho, Deshi o Toru!? / Akane-chan ga Yattekita" (Japanese: ゲラチョ、弟子をとる！？ / あかねちゃんがやってきた)	June 16, 2016
38	"A Straytama's Feelings"; Transliteration: "Noratama no Omoi" (Japanese: ノラたまの想い)	June 23, 2016
39	"The Happy Hunters Goes to the Amusement Park!"; Transliteration: "Happī Hantā, Yuuenchi e Iku!" (Japanese: ハッピーハンター、遊園地へ行く！)	June 30, 2016
40	"The Cocotama Land is Done!"; Transliteration: "Tsukurou! Kokotama Rando" (Japanese: つくろう！ここたまランド)	July 7, 2016
41	"The Game in the Library! / You Won't Go to the Infirmary!?"; Transliteration: "Toshokan de shōbudegozaimasu! / Hotto dekinai hoken-shitsu!?" (Japanese: 図書館で勝負でございます！ / ほ～っとできない保健室！？)	July 21, 2016
42	"We'll All Make a New Menu! / Cocotama Land Summer Pool"; Transliteration: "Minna de tsukurou! Shin Menyū / Natsu da Pūru da Kokotama Rando" (Japanese: みんなでつくろう！新メニュー / 夏だ プールだ ここたまランド)	July 28, 2016
43	"The Yukata Big Wave! / The Cocotamas Goes to the Summer Festival!"; Transliteration: "Yukata de Biggu Wēbu! / Kokotama, Natsu Matsuri e iku!" (Japanese: 浴衣でビッグウェーブ！ / ここたま、夏祭りへ行く！)	August 4, 2016
44	"To Grandma's House"; Transliteration: "Obāchan no Ie e" (Japanese: おばあちゃんの家へ)	August 11, 2016
45	"The Cocotama Summer Adventure!"; Transliteration: "Kokotama Natsu no Daibōken!" (Japanese: ここたま 夏の大冒険！)	August 18, 2016
46	"Aim for the Happy Stars! / Memories of Summer"; Transliteration: "Nerae! Happī Sutā / Natsu no Omoide" (Japanese: ねらえ！ハッピースター / 夏の思い出)	August 25, 2016
47	"Cocotama Chore Operation! / The Smiling Baby Cocotama, Nicolie"; Transliteration: "Kokotama Katsudō Daisakusen! / Akachan Kokotama Nikori de Nikkori" (Japanese: ここたま活動大作戦！ / 赤ちゃんここたま ニコリでにっこり)	September 1, 2016
48	"Throb Throb! Kokoro's Birthday"; Transliteration: "Dokidoki! Kokoro no tanjōbi" (Japanese: ドキドキ！こころの誕生日)	September 8, 2016
49	"Welcome, Nicolie / That's it! I'll Write a Letter!"; Transliteration: "Irasshai, Nikori / Sōda Tegami o Kakou" (Japanese: いらっしゃい、ニコリ / そうだ手紙を書こう)	September 15, 2016
50	"Straytama Trio: the Gods of Love? / Come Work, Happy Ukero!"; Transliteration: "Koi no kamisama? Noratama Torio / Batchi koi, Wai ga Ukerō ya!" (Japanese: 恋の神さま？ノラたまトリオ / ばっちこい、ワイがウケローや！)	September 22, 2016
51	"A Cinderella Happening"; Transliteration: "Shinderera Hapuningu" (Japanese: シンデレラ・ハプニング)	September 29, 2016
52	"The Birth of Queen Mishil!? / Kokoro and Luckytama: Memories of that Day"; Transliteration: "Tanjō!? Mishiru Joō-Sama / Kokoro to Rakitama: Omoide no Hi" (Japanese: 誕生！？ミシル女王様 / こころとラキたま 思い出の日)	October 6, 2016
53	"Kirarise's Fashionable Class / Chewing Bell Peppers!"; Transliteration: "Kirarisu no Oshare Kyōshitsu / Mogu Mogu, Pīmantsuā!" (Japanese: キラリスのおしゃれ教室 / モグモグ、ピーマンツアー！)	October 13, 2016
54	"Be Quiet When Reading / Melory the Poster Girl-nano♪"; Transliteration: "Dokusho-chū wa o Shizuka ni / Kanban Musume Merorī-nano♪" (Japanese: 読書中はお静かにー / 看板娘 メロリーなの♪)	October 20, 2016
55	"Surprise! Halloween Party"; Transliteration: "Dokkiri! Harouin Pātī" (Japanese: どっきり！ハロウィンパーティー)	October 27, 2016
56	"My Codename is 753 / The Ban Ban Dashi Dashi Super Training!"; Transliteration: "Kōdonēmu wa 753 / Ban Ban Dashi Dashi mō Tokkun ja!" (Japanese: コードネームは753 / バンバンダシダシ猛特訓じゃ！)	November 3, 2016
57	"Burn with Passion! Geracho-sensei / Say Cheese for Our Friendship Photo!"; Transliteration: "Nekketsu! Geracho sensei / Nakayoshi Shashin de Hai, Chīzu!" (Japanese: 熱血！ゲラチョ先生 / なかよし写真でハイ、チーズ！)	November 10, 2016
58	"A Loving Big, Refreshing Bathtime! / Mush Mukunyu, the Drawing Board God!"; Transliteration: "Ofuro Daisuki Sappari Rin! / Gaban no Kamisama! Musshu Mukun'nu" (Japanese: お風呂大好きさっぱりりん！ / 画板の神様！ムッシュ・ムクンヌ)	November 17, 2016
59	"The Search for the Sacred Egg!"; Transliteration: "Seinaru Tamago o Sagase!" (Japanese: 聖なるたまごを探せ！)	November 24, 2016
60	"Beating the Cold! / Nicolie's in Trouble!? Hurry, Pinko!!"; Transliteration: "Kaze o Yattsukero! / Nikori no Pinchi!? Hashire Pinko!!" (Japanese: かぜをやっつけろ！ / ニコリのピンチ！？走れピンコ！！)	December 1, 2016
61	"Slip Slip! The Cocotama Skating Competition / Vivit has been Followed!"; Transliteration: "Tsurutsuru! Kokotama Sukēto Taikai / Bibitto o oe!" (Japanese: ツルツル！ここたまスケート大会 / ビビットを追え！)	December 8, 2016
62	"Kokoro and Nozomi's Pajama Party"; Transliteration: "Kokoro to Nozomi no Pajama Pātī" (Japanese: こころとのぞみのパジャマパーティー)	December 15, 2016
63	"Christmas in Cocotama Land"; Transliteration: "Kokotama Rando de Kurisumasu" (Japanese: ここたまランドでクリスマス)	December 22, 2016
64	"A Cocotama New Year's Dream Panic! / Gooey Mochi Kirarise"; Transliteration: "Kokotama no Hatsuyume Panikku! / Motchi Mochi Kirarisu" (Japanese: ここたまの初夢パニック！ / もっちもちキラリス)	January 5, 2017
65	"That One Special Seat / Headmaster Kokoro's Piano Lesson♪"; Transliteration: "Tatta Hitotsu no Tokubetsu seki / Kokoro Sensei no Piano Ressun♪" (Japanese: たったひとつのとくべつせき / こころ先生のピアノレッスン♪)	January 12, 2017
66	"Nozomi's Feelings, Vivit's Feelings"; Transliteration: "Nozomi no Omoi, Bibitto no Omoi" (Japanese: のぞみの想い、ビビットの想い)	January 19, 2017
67	"A Cocotama's Hidden Taste / The Comedic Soccer Fight!"; Transliteration: "Kakushi-mi wa, kokottama / Owarai de Sakkā mō Tokkun!" (Japanese: 隠し味は、ここったま / お笑いでサッカー猛特訓！)	January 26, 2017
68	"Scattering Beans! The Setsubun Battle!! / Hot Nicolie's Infirmary"; Transliteration: "Mame Make! Setsubun Batoru!! / Hotto Nikkori Hoken-Shitsu" (Japanese: 豆まけ！節分バトル！！ / ホッとニッコリ保健室)	February 2, 2017
69	"A Brother's Love... / Everyone's Happy Valentine!?"; Transliteration: "Aniki no koi... / Min'na de Happī!? Barentain" (Japanese: アニキの恋。。。 / みんなでハッピー!?バレンタイン)	February 9, 2017
70	"A Big, Exciting Television Debut"; Transliteration: "Terebi Debyū de Dai Sawagi" (Japanese: テレビデビューで大さわぎ)	February 16, 2017
71	"The Traveling Cocotama, Yuuki / Mishil and Mogutan: Happy Hunters?"; Transliteration: "Tabi suru Kokotama Yukki / Happī Hantā? Mishiru & Mogutan" (Japanese: 旅するここたま ゆっきー / ハッピーハンター？ミシル&モグタン)	February 23, 2017
72	"Always Happy! Mukumuku Arrange / The Rabbit God, Again"; Transliteration: "Zuppazutsupa! Arenji Mukumuku / Usagi no Kamisama, Futatabi" (Japanese: ずっぱずっぱ! アレンジムクムク / ウサギの神さま、再び)	March 2, 2017
73	"Catching the Sunset!? / Search for the Wedding Ring"; Transliteration: "Yūhi o Tsukamaero!? / Kekkon Yubiwa o Sagasu no yo ni" (Japanese: 夕陽をつかまえろ!? / 結婚指輪を探すのよん)	March 9, 2017
74	"I'll Make a Wish for Nozomi!"; Transliteration: "Nozomi no Negai o Kanaetai!" (Japanese: のぞみの願いをかなえたい!)	March 16, 2017
75	"Wake Up! Vivit"; Transliteration: "Mezamete! Bibitto" (Japanese: めざめて!ビビット)	March 23, 2017
76	"I Love Everyone! Cocotama!!"; Transliteration: "Minna Daisuki! Kokottama!!" (Japanese: みんな大好き!ここったま!!)	March 30, 2017

=== Arc 2: Raichi and Hikari ===
No.	Title	Original release date
77	"Exciting Spring: Cocotama Activity / The Cocotamas Broke the House"; Transliteration: "Haru no ukiuki ♪ Kokotama katsudō / Kokotama, Ie o kowasu" (Japanese: 春のウキウキ♪ここたま活動 / ここたま、家をこわす)	April 6, 2017
78	"Camping with Everyone! / Geracho's Training Journey?"; Transliteration: "Minna de Kyanpu! / Geracho Shugyō no Tabi e?" (Japanese: みんなでキャンプ！ / ゲラチョ修行の旅へ？)	April 13, 2017
79	"Let's Go to the Movie Theater / Secrets of the Cocotama World!?"; Transliteration: "Eigakan e Ikou / Kokotama-kai no Himitsu!?" (Japanese: 映画館へいこう / ここたま界のヒミツ！？)	April 20, 2017
80	"A Temporary Contract? Raichi is Born"; Transliteration: "Kari no Keiyaku? Raichi Tanjō" (Japanese: 仮のけいやく?ライチ誕生)	April 27, 2017
Movie	"Cocotama: Secret Apprentice Gods the Movie: Make a Miracle! Tepple and the Exciting Cocotama World"; Transliteration: "Eiga Kamisama Minarai Himitsu no Kokotama Kiseki o okose ♪ Teppuru to dokidoki kokotama-kai" (Japanese: 映画かみさまみならい ヒミツのここたま 奇跡をおこせ♪テップルとドキドキここたま界)	April 28, 2017
81	"Can't Do Magic!? Go for it, Raichi!"; Transliteration: "Mahō ga Denai!? Ganbare Raichi" (Japanese: まほうが出ない!?がんばれライチ)	May 4, 2017
82	"A Cocotama Activity with Amanda / Dreams for a Guest House-nano♪"; Transliteration: "Amanda to Kokotama Katsudō / Otomari Hausu wa Yume Ippai nano♪" (Japanese: アマンダとここたま活動 / おとまりハウスは夢いっぱいなの♪)	May 11, 2017
83	"Welcome to the CocoTre House! / Parine's Easy Moments"; Transliteration: "Yōkoso! Kokotore Hausu / Parīnu no Yasashī Hitotoki" (Japanese: ようこそ!ここトレハウス / パリーヌのやさしいひととき)	May 18, 2017
84	"Kirarise vs Aoyama / Presenting the Great Cocotama Athletic Meet!"; Transliteration: "Kirarisu VS Aoyama-kun / Kaisai! Kokotama Dai Undōkai" (Japanese: キラリスVS青山くん / 開催!ここたま大運動会)	May 25, 2017
85	"I'm Pikota! Nice to Meet You!"; Transliteration: "Hajimemashite Pikotadearimasu" (Japanese: はじめまして ピコタであります)	June 1, 2017
86	"Chin-Chin V-V Illusion!? / Mogutan is Here Training?"; Transliteration: "Chi-chin puipui iryūjon!? / Mogutan Tadaima Shugyōchū?" (Japanese: ちちんぷいぷいイリュージョン!? / モグタンただいま修行中?)	June 8, 2017
87	"The Cocotama Clinic Opens!"; Transliteration: "Kokotama Kurinikku ōpun!" (Japanese: ここたまクリニックオープン！)	June 15, 2017
88	"Refreshed Feelings! Sarine's Prospective / Ayaka and Ukero's Baseball Class"; Transliteration: "Kimochi Sappari! Maemuki Sarīnu / Ayaka to Ukerō no Yakyū Kyōshitsu" (Japanese: 気持ちさっぱり!前向きサリーヌ / あやかとウケローの野球教室)	June 22, 2017
89	"Pikota is Going to School / Cocotama Spy Melory-Nano~"; Transliteration: "Pikota, Gakkō e Iku de arimasu / Kokotama Supai Merorī nano" (Japanese: ピコタ、学校へ行くであります / ここたまスパイメロリーなの～)	June 29, 2017
90	"Welcome Back! Nozomi & Vivit / The Opening of the new Pokopoko Shop!"; Transliteration: "Okaeri! Nozomi & Bibitto / Kaiten! Shin Pokopoko Shoppu" (Japanese: おかえり！のぞみ&ビビット / 開店!新ポコポコショップ)	July 6, 2017
91	"The Return of the Happy Hunters"; Transliteration: "Kaettekita Happī Hantā" (Japanese: 帰ってきたハッピーハンター)	July 20, 2017
92	"Patarina's Cleaning Duties / Cocotama Land Summer Festival"; Transliteration: "Patarīna no Osōji Dai Sakusen / Kokotama Rando de Natsu Matsuri ja" (Japanese: パタリーナのお掃除大作戦 / ここたまランドで夏祭りじゃ)	July 27, 2017
93	"Big Pinch!? Dream Stage with Pikota"; Transliteration: "Dai Pinchi!? Pikota to Yume no Sutēji" (Japanese: 大ピンチ!?ピコタと夢のステージ)	August 3, 2017
94	"Kokoro and Nozomi's Summer Vacation"; Transliteration: "Kokoro to Nozomi no Natsuyasumi" (Japanese: こころとのぞみの夏休み)	August 10, 2017
95	"The Great Summer Island Adventure"; Transliteration: "Samā Airando Daibōken" (Japanese: サマーアイランド大冒険)	August 17, 2017
96	"Heart-pounding! Secret Sleepover / Following Where Nicolie is Going"; Transliteration: "Doki-doki! Himitsu no Otomari-kai / Nikori o otte doko made mo" (Japanese: ドキドキ！ヒミツのおとまり会 / ニコリを追ってどこまでも)	August 24, 2017
97	"Pikota is now Graduating"; Transliteration: "Pikota, Sotsugyō suru de arimasu" (Japanese: ピコタ、卒業するであります)	August 31, 2017
98	"Kokoro's Small Surprise Birthday"; Transliteration: "Bikkuri Kokoro no Chīsana Tanjōbi" (Japanese: びっくりこころの小さな誕生日)	September 7, 2017
99	"Chocolancy, the Hot-Blooded Cocotama!"; Transliteration: "Nekketsu Kokotama Shokoranshe!" (Japanese: 熱血ここたま ショコランシェ！)	September 14, 2017
100	"The Cocotama Academy Opens! / The Straytama Trio's Newest Member!?"; Transliteration: "Kokotama Gakkō, Kaikō desu! / Shin Menbā!? Noratama Torio" (Japanese: ここたま学校、開校です！ / 新メンバー！？ノラたまトリオ)	September 21, 2017
101	"Chocolancy's School Exploration"; Transliteration: "Shokoranshe no Gakkō Tanken" (Japanese: ショコランシェの学校探検)	September 28, 2017
102	"Taking a Bath is Fun♪ / Kurun and the Pretty One-Piece Dress"; Transliteration: "Odekake Ofuro wa Tanoshī na♪ / Kurun to Sutekina Wan-pīsu" (Japanese: おでかけお風呂はたのしいな♪ / クルンとすてきなワンピース)	October 5, 2017
103	"Getting Nicolie's Smile Back! / Kirarise's Search for Happiness"; Transliteration: "Nikori no egao o torimodose! / Kirarisu no shiawase sagashi" (Japanese: ニコリの笑顔をとりもどせ！ / キラリスの幸せ探し)	October 12, 2017
104	"Wall News is an Art~ / Senior Pikota has Arrived"; Transliteration: "Kabe shinbun wa Geijutsu desu ne~ / Pikota-Senpai ga, Yattekita" (Japanese: かべしんぶんは芸術ですネ～ / ピコタせんぱいが、やってきた)	October 19, 2017
105	"The Cocotama Halloween Mystery"; Transliteration: "Kokotama Harouin Misuterī" (Japanese: ここたまハロウィンミステリー)	October 26, 2017
106	"The Fall Sweets Cooking-daguu / Don't Give Up! Chocolancy!!"; Transliteration: "Aki no Suītsu Kukkingu daguu/ Makeruna! Shokoranshe!!" (Japanese: 秋のスイーツクッキングだぐぅ / 負けるな！ショコランシェ！！)	November 2, 2017
107	"Tepple and the Broken Music Box / Nice To Meet You? I'm Scraptama"; Transliteration: "Teppuru to Kowareta Orugōru / Hajimemashite? Boku, Dametama" (Japanese: テップルと壊れたオルゴール / はじめまして?ぼく、ダメたま)	November 9, 2017
108	"Change! Geracho and Niche / Both of Them Disbanded!?"; Transliteration: "Chenji! Geracho to Nīchie / Ano Futari ga Kaisan!?" (Japanese: チェンジ!ゲラチョとニーチエ / あの二人が解散!?)	November 16, 2017
109	"The Banban Dashdash Training Again! / Protect the CocoTre House"; Transliteration: "Ban ban Dashi Dashi Mata Tokkun! / Kokotore Hausu o Mamore" (Japanese: バンバンダシダシまた特訓! / ここトレハウスを守れ)	November 23, 2017
110	"Oshaki Sings!! / The Cocotama House is Breaking Down!?"; Transliteration: "Oshaki Utaimasu!! / Kokotama Hausu Dai Bunkai!?" (Japanese: おシャキ歌います!! / ここたまハウス大分解!?)	November 30, 2017
111	"Warm Pocaline"; Transliteration: "Pokapoka Pokarin" (Japanese: ぽかぽかポカリン)	December 7, 2017
112	"Letters from a Backpack"; Transliteration: "Randoseru kara no Tegami" (Japanese: ランドセルからの手紙)	December 14, 2017
113	"A Contract in the Snowfall Night / Cocotama Santa, Dispatch!"; Transliteration: "Yukifuru Yoru no Keiyakusho / Kokotama Santa, Shutsudō!" (Japanese: 雪降る夜のけいやくしょ / ここたまサンタ、出動!)	December 21, 2017
114	"Pocaline's Admiration / Duel! Patarina vs. Hotney!"; Transliteration: "Pokarin o Homenaide / Bōsō! Patarīna vs. Hottonī!" (Japanese: ポカリンをほめないで / 暴走!パタリーナVSホットニー!)	January 4, 2018
115	"Kotatsu Paradise / The Scarf God, Heaton"; Transliteration: "Kotatsu Paradaisu / Mafurā no Kamisama hīton" (Japanese: こたつパラダイス / マフラーのかみさまヒートン)	January 11, 2018
116	"Go Go Yuuki / Awawa's Big Refreshing Adventure"; Transliteration: "Yuke Yuke Yukki / Awawa to Sappari Daibōken" (Japanese: ゆけゆけゆっきー / アワワとサッパリ大冒険)	January 18, 2018
117	"Aim for the Miracle Magic! / Kirarise Does Her Best"; Transliteration: "Mezase! Mirakuru Majikku / Kirarisu Ganbaru" (Japanese: めざせ!ミラクルマジック / キラリスがんばる)	January 25, 2018
118	"Heaton and Pocaline / What is it? An Ogre Behind Us?"; Transliteration: "Hīton to Pokarin / Oni wa soto de, nandeya nen?" (Japanese: ヒートンとポカリン / 鬼はそとで、なんでやねん？)	February 1, 2018
119	"Go Forth, Hikari and Raichi! / The Last Valentines"; Transliteration: "Susume! Hikari to Raichi / Saigo no Barentain" (Japanese: 進め!ひかりとライチ / 最後のバレンタイン)	February 8, 2018
120	"Ukero's Awesome Cheering Squad! / Get into the Rhythm ♪ Kokoro-sensei"; Transliteration: "Batchi koi! Ukerō ōen-dan/ Rizumu ni notte ♪ kokoro sensei" (Japanese: ばっちこい!ウケロー応援団 / リズムにのって♪こころ先生)	February 15, 2018
121	"Let's Go Home"; Transliteration: "Ouchi e Kaerou" (Japanese: おうちへ帰ろう)	February 22, 2018
122	"Two People, One Legend / Kokoro and Hikari's Bound Tested"; Transliteration: "Futari no Ichi nin mae Densetsu/ Kokoro to Hikari, Tamesa reru Kizuna" (Japanese: 二人のいちにんまえ伝説 / こころとひかり、試される絆)	March 1, 2018
123	"It's a Hikari Magic!"; Transliteration: "Ittsu a Hikari Majikku!" (Japanese: イッツアひかりマジック！)	March 8, 2018
124	"Cinemaru's Movie Paradise"; Transliteration: "Shinemaru no Eiga Paradaisu" (Japanese: シネマルの映画パラダイス)	March 15, 2018
125	"Cocotama, a Week of Secrets"; Transliteration: "Kokotama, Himitsu no Isshūkan" (Japanese: ここたま、ヒミツの一週間)	March 22, 2018
126	"Please Remember! Kokoro!"; Transliteration: "Omoideshite! Kokoro!" (Japanese: 思い出して!こころ!)	March 29, 2018

=== Arc 3: Lost Pants Arc ===
No.	Title	Original release date
127	"The Search for the Adult Pants"; Transliteration: "Ichininmae Pantsu o Sagase" (Japanese: 一人前パンツをさがせ)	April 5, 2018
128	"Tama-Shine Appears Beside You!"; Transliteration: "Anata no soba ni Tama-shain tōjō!" (Japanese: あなたのそばに たまシャイン登場！)	April 12, 2018
129	"Kanna's CocoTre Training / Let All Flowers Bloom"; Transliteration: "Kan'na no KokoTore Shugyō / Ohana o Sakaseyou" (Japanese: カンナのここトレ修行 / お花を咲かせよう)	April 19, 2018
130	"Duel! Tama-Shine and Tama-Sennin"; Transliteration: "Taiketsu! Tama-Shain to Tama-Sen'nin" (Japanese: 対決！たまシャインとたませんにん)	April 26, 2018
131	"Kokoro's Treasures / Detective Osharlock"; Transliteration: "Kokoro no Takaramono/ Meitantei Oshārokku" (Japanese: こころのたからもの / めいたんてい おシャーロック)	May 3, 2018
132	"The Unhindered Suie!"; Transliteration: "Suisuisūi!" (Japanese: スイスイスーイ!)	May 10, 2018
133	"Suie and the Unhindered Search! / Shine! Kirarise"; Transliteration: "Sūi to Suisui Dai Sōsaku! / Kagayake! Kirarisu" (Japanese: スーイとスイスイだいそうさく！ / 輝け！キラリス)	May 17, 2018
134	"A Big Magical Panic!? / The Straytama Park on Fire"; Transliteration: "Mahō de Dai Panikku!? / Honō no Noratama kōen" (Japanese: 魔法で大パニック!? / 炎のノラたま公園)	May 24, 2018
135	"Dad is Busy Working / The Adult Pants were Found!"; Transliteration: "Otōsan wa Dai Isogashi / Mitsuketa! Ichininmae pantsu" (Japanese: お父さんは大いそがし / 見つけた!一人前パンツ)	May 31, 2018
136	"Rescue Kokoro! The Cocotama Trials"; Transliteration: "Kokoro o Sukue! Kokotama no Shiren" (Japanese: こころを救え!ここたまの試練)	June 7, 2018
137	"The Big Chase in the Cocotama World!"; Transliteration: "Kokotama-kai de Dai Tsuiseki!" (Japanese: ここたま界で大ついせき！)	June 14, 2018
138	"Saving the Cocotama World!"; Transliteration: "Kokotama-kai o sukue!" (Japanese: ここたま界を救え!)	June 21, 2018
139	"Together Forever, Cocotama"; Transliteration: "Zutto Isshoni Kokottama" (Japanese: ずっと一緒に ここったま)	June 28, 2018
