= List of Kira Kira Happy Hirake! Cocotama episodes =

- No. of episodes: 55

Release
- Original network: TXN (TV Tokyo, TV Osaka)
- Original release: September 6, 2018 – September 26, 2019

Series chronology
- ← Previous; Kamisama Minarai: Himitsu no Cocotama Next → Mono no Kamisama Cocotama

Kira Kira Happy ★ Hirake! Cocotama (Japanese: キラキラハッピー★ひらけ！ここたま, Hepburn: Kirakira Happī ★ Hirake! Kokotama; "Glittering Happy ★ Open! Cocotama") is a Fantasy comedy anime series and the second installment to Bandai Namco's Cocotama Series, following the 2015 series Kamisama Minarai: Himitsu no Cocotama. Directed by Norio Nitta and written by Michihiro Tsuchiya with character design drafts from Yuka Fujiwara and character designs from Shinobu Ookawa and Shouji Yasukazu. The series premiered in all TXN stations in Japan from September 6, 2018, to September 26, 2019, replacing Kamisama Minarai: Himitsu no Cocotama: Natsu Da! Ōhashagi Special in its initial timeslot.

The series revolves around Haruka Hoshinogawa, a fifth grade student and resident of Sakura Town. Long time ago, she made a wish with the town's old Cherry Blossom tree with her grandfather while receiving a present from him: a cherry blossom ribbon. As she grew up, she treasured the gift that was given to her while starting fifth grade in her school. One day, upon noting that the old cherry blossom tree is wilting, her grandfather decided to leave the shop to explore the world and let Haruka take care of the store in his absence. The next day while sleeping, her treasured ribbon sprouted a strange egg, revealing a Cocotama, a god born from an object that has been cherished with love and care. Haruka woke up and accidentally saw the Cocotama on the table, retreated to her Hiding Egg. As Haruka picked it up, it has changed into a mysterious key. Left with some questions, the Cocotama introduced herself as Ribbon and Haruka learned about the existence of her kind and the mysteries behind the strange key she had. Ribbon realized that the key is actually the Key of Wonders, and that Haruka was chosen by it to be the Legendary Contractor to the Cocotamas. Now, both of them try to run the shop and meet new Cocotama friends, while discovering the mysteries and powers behind the Key of Wonders.

The music for the sequel is composed by Ken Itō (Handa-Kun) and Kenichi Kuroda. The series's opening theme is titled "Himitsu no Kagi, Cocotama!" (ヒミツのカギ、ここたま！, Himitsu no kagi, kokotama!; "The Secret Key, Cocotama!") by Minami Takahashi, Inori Minase, Mariya Ise and Emiri Iwai while the first ending song is titled "Cocotama Sagaso-tsu! Mi~tsukketta♪" (ここたまさがそっ！み～つっけた♪, Kokotama sagaso~tsu! Mi~tsukketa ♪; "Look for Cocotamas! I~found You♪") by Kaoru Masaki. Later, replaced by second ending song is titled "Cocotama Town De Nikkoniko★" (ここたまタウンでにっこにこ★, Kokotama Taun De Nikkoniko★) by Kaoru Masaki and Erika.

== Episode list ==
No.	Title	Original release date
1	"The Faithful Meeting, Open the Door of Happiness!"; Transliteration: "Unmei no Deai Hirake! Shiawase no Tobira" (Japanese: 運命の出会い ひらけ！幸せの扉)	September 6, 2018
2	"Gu~suka, Pillow is Bo~orn"; Transliteration: "Gu~suka Pirō Tanjō da yo~o" (Japanese: ぐ～すか ピロー誕生だよぉ)	September 13, 2018
3	"What-meow! Chaco Came Out!"; Transliteration: "Nyanto! Chako Umareta desu!" (Japanese: にゃんと！ちゃこ生まれたです！)	September 20, 2018
4	"Working in the Antique Shop? / Helping Mom!"; Transliteration: "Antīku Shoppu wa ōisogashi? / Okāsan o Sukue!" (Japanese: アンティークショップは大忙し？ / お母さんをすくえ！)	September 27, 2018
5	"Ruby, Arriving in Style!"; Transliteration: "Pikatto tōjō! Rubī desu wa" (Japanese: ピカッと登場！ルビーですわ)	October 4, 2018
6	"Hoho~, Marme has Come!"; Transliteration: "Hoho~, Marume ga kita nodearu!" (Japanese: ほほ～っ、マルメが来たのである！)	October 11, 2018
7	"Cocotama Castle Uproar"; Transliteration: "Kokotama Kyassuru de dai sawagi" (Japanese: ここたまキャッスルで大さわぎ)	October 18, 2018
8	"Nice To Meet You: Ojou's Debut-jo"; Transliteration: "Hajimemashite Ojō tōjō da-jo" (Japanese: はじめまして おジョウ登場だジョ)	October 25, 2018
9	"Ojou Comes Down From The Mountain! / Operation Smile Get"; Transliteration: "Ojō ga yama kara Yattekita! / Sumairu Getto dai sakusen" (Japanese: おジョウが山からやってきた! / スマイルゲット大作戦)	November 1, 2018
10	"Pan-Pon Pantonio"; Transliteration: "Pān to pōn to pantonio" (Japanese: パーンとポーンとパントニオ)	November 8, 2018
11	"It's Right There! / Please Don't Say Goodbye"; Transliteration: "Naname wa dokoda! / Sayonara haiwa naide" (Japanese: ナナメはどーこだ！ / さよならは言わないで)	November 15, 2018
12	"The Cocotama Restaurant's Aspiring Chef"; Transliteration: "Kokotama Resutoran de Goukai Shefu" (Japanese: ここたまレストランでごうかいシェフ)	November 22, 2018
13	"Chaco Becomes a Waitress / Scope the Star Wanderer"; Transliteration: "Chako, Ueitoresu ni Naru / Hoshi no Tabibito Sukōpu" (Japanese: ちゃこ、ウェイトレスになる / 星の旅人スコープ)	November 29, 2018
14	"Cocotama Camping Joy♪ / The Compact that Delivers Smiles"; Transliteration: "Kokotama Kyanpu da hoi♪ / Egao o Todokeru Konpakuto" (Japanese: ここたまキャンプだホイ♪ / えがおを届けるコンパクト)	December 6, 2018
15	"Tuxy-Dreesy Ushishishi~"; Transliteration: "Takisshī Doresshī usshisshi~" (Japanese: タキッシードレッシーうっしっし～)	December 13, 2018
16	"Christmas in Big Trouble!?"; Transliteration: "Kurisumasu dai panikku!?" (Japanese: クリスマス大パニック!?)	December 20, 2018
17	"Ribbon Works Hard! / Goodbye Ribbon"; Transliteration: "Ribon, hatarakimasu! / Sayonara Ribon" (Japanese: リボン、はたらきます！ / さよならリボン)	December 27, 2018
18	"The Baby Cocotamas, Tsu-Mi-Ki!"; Transliteration: "Akachan Kokotama Tsū Mī Kī!" (Japanese: 赤ちゃんここたま ツーミーキー!)	January 10, 2019
19	"Cocotama Shop, Open!"; Transliteration: "Kokotama Shoppu, ōpun!" (Japanese: ここたまショップ、オープン！)	January 17, 2019
20	"A Nice Doctor Came! / Looking for a Something!"; Transliteration: "Sutekina Oisha ga Yattekita! / Sagashi-mononara Kokottama!" (Japanese: ステキなお医者がやってきた！ / さがし物ならここったま！)	January 24, 2019
21	"The Cocotama Clinic, Yeah!"; Transliteration: "Kokotama kurinikku da i~ē!" (Japanese: ここたまクリニックだイェー！)	January 31, 2019
22	"I Hate This Medicine! / Serving Some Sweets"; Transliteration: "Okusuri nante dai kirai! / Suītsu meshiagare" (Japanese: お薬なんて大キライ! / スイーツめしあがれ)	February 7, 2019
23	"Dodonn~ Rannin has Arrived!"; Transliteration: "Dodon to sanjō! Rannin de gozaru" (Japanese: ドドンと参上！らんにんでござる)	February 14, 2019
24	"Tsu is Missing!? / Do Your Best, Big Sister Haruka"; Transliteration: "Tsū ga kieta!? / Ganbare Haruka oneechan" (Japanese: ツーが消えた！？ / がんばれ はるかお姉ちゃん)	February 21, 2019
25	"Nachu Becomes a Mom!? / Onward! Cocotama Bus"; Transliteration: "Nāchu mama ni naru!? / Hashire! Kokotama Basu" (Japanese: ナーチュ ママになる！？ / はしれ！ここたまバス)	February 28, 2019
26	"Amelie is Raining Down!"; Transliteration: "Ame ame fure fure, Ameri da yo!" (Japanese: あめあめふれふれ、アメリだよ！)	March 7, 2019
27	"Ribbon and Amelie, Working Together! / The Legendary Cocotama Town"; Transliteration: "Ribon to Ameri, Hatarakimasu! / Densetsu no Kokotama taun" (Japanese: リボンとアメリ、はたらきます！ / 伝説のここたまタウン)	March 14, 2019
28	"Happy Cocotama, Getchom"; Transliteration: "Happī Kokotama Getchomu Dappi" (Japanese: ハッピーここたま ゲッチョムだっぴ)	March 21, 2019
29	"Do Your Best, Cocotama Town Complete"; Transliteration: "Ganbare Kokotama Taun Kansei" (Japanese: がんばれ ここたまタウン完成)	March 28, 2019
30	"Cocotama Activity with a Lot of Smile"; Transliteration: "Egao Ippai Kokotama Katsudō" (Japanese: 笑顔いっぱい ここたま活動)	April 4, 2019
31	"Mysterious Egg has Arrived!"; Transliteration: "Nazo No Tamago Ga Yattekita!" (Japanese: 謎のたまごがやって来た！)	April 11, 2019
32	"Surprised! Secret of the Egg/Hold It Right There! Patrol!"; Transliteration: "Bikkuri! Tamago No Himitsu/Mate Matetai Hoda! Patoru Pato!" (Japanese: びっくり！たまごのヒミツ/まてまてたいほだ！パトルパト！)	April 18, 2019
33	"Amelie and Cocotama Amusement Park"; Transliteration: "Ameri To Kokotama Yuenchi" (Japanese: アメリとここたま遊園地)	April 25, 2019
34	"Protect the Cocotama Castle!"; Transliteration: "Kokotama Kyassuru O Mamore!" (Japanese: ここたまキャッスルを守れ！)	May 2, 2019
35	"The Tiara Goddess, Tia/Search the Firefly"; Transliteration: "Tiara No Kamisama Tia Desu Wa/Hotaru O Sagashite" (Japanese: ティアラのかみさま ティアですわ/ホタルをさがして)	May 9, 2019
36	"The Secret of Cocotama Town"; Transliteration: "Kokotama Taun No Himitsu" (Japanese: ここたまタウンのひみつ)	May 16, 2019
37	"Gu~suka, Pi~suka, I Want to Sleep/Don't Want to be a Princess!?"; Transliteration: "Gu~suka Pi~suka, Nemuritai/Ohimesama Ni Narita Kunai! ?" (Japanese: ぐーすかぴーすか、ねむりたい/お姫様になりたくない！？)	May 23, 2019
38	"Cocotama Police 24 Hours/Chaco and the Grandpa Gummy-Gummy"; Transliteration: "Kokotama Keisatsu 24 Ji/Chako To Gami Gami Ojīsan" (Japanese: ここたま警察24時/ちゃことガミガミおじいさん)	May 30, 2019
39	"A Big Panic Until It Fell/Shine! Idol Cocotama, Main"; Transliteration: "Korotta Made, Dai Panikku/Kagayake! Aidoru Kokotama Main" (Japanese: ころったまで、大パニック/輝け！アイドルここたま マイン)	June 6, 2019
40	"Idol Mode On!/Aim! Space!"; Transliteration: "Aidoru Mōdo On!/Kagayake! Mezase! Uchū!" (Japanese: アイドルモード オン！/めざせ！宇宙！)	June 13, 2019
41	"Nicky is Coming!"; Transliteration: "Nikkī Ga Kita!" (Japanese: ニッキーが来た！)	June 20, 2019
42	"Nicky Ninja Training/Lend Me Your Strength! Cooking Class"; Transliteration: "Nikkī No Ninja Shugyō/Chikara O Awasete! O Ryōri Kyōshitsu" (Japanese: ニッキーの忍者修行/力をあわせて！お料理教室)	June 29, 2019
43	"Haruka Birthday Protection Squad!"; Transliteration: "Haruka No Tanjōbi Mamori Tai!" (Japanese: はるかの誕生日まもり隊！)	July 4, 2019
44	"Special Offer, Pashari!"; Transliteration: "Tokudane Itadaki Pashari Pasha!" (Japanese: 特ダネいただき パシャリパシャ！)	July 11, 2019
45	"Buttocks Champion! Decisive Battle/Let's Make Cocotama News!"; Transliteration: "Oshiri Chanpion! Ketteisen/Kokotama Shinbun O Tsukurou!" (Japanese: おしりチャンピオン！決定戦/ここたま新聞をつくろう！)	July 18, 2019
46	"The Return of Sebastian/Big Pinch! Rescue Haruka!"; Transliteration: "Kaettekita Sebasuchan/Dai Pinchi! Haruka O Sukue!" (Japanese: 帰ってきたセバスチャン/大ピンチ！はるかを救え！)	July 25, 2019
47	"Training! Combination Magic/Showdown! An Forest of Minus Power"; Transliteration: "Tokkun! Gattai Mahō/Taiketsu! Mainasu Pawā No Ki" (Japanese: とっくん！合体魔法/対決！マイナスパワーの木)	August 1, 2019
48	"Cocotama Castle was Stolen/Where Are We Going? Cocotama World"; Transliteration: "Ubawareta Kokotama Kyassuru/Doko Ni Aru No? Kokotama Kai" (Japanese: うばわれた ここたまキャッスル/どこにあるの？ここたま界)	August 8, 2019
49	"We Finally Make It! Cocotama World"; Transliteration: "Yattekimashita! Kokotama Kai" (Japanese: やってきました！ここたま界)	August 15, 2019
50	"Full Fledge Cocotama vs Sakura Town Protection Squad"; Transliteration: "Ichininmae Kokotama VS Sakurachou Mamori Tai" (Japanese: 一人前ここたまVS桜町まもり隊)	August 22, 2019
51	"Tsu-Mi-Ki to a Magical Journey/Cocotama Town is a Mess!?"; Transliteration: "Tsū Mī Kī, Mahō No Tabi E/Kokotama Taun Ga Dai Konran!?" (Japanese: ツーミーキー、魔法のたびへ/ここたまタウンが大混乱！？)	August 29, 2019
52	"Everyone Let's Help Sakura"; Transliteration: "Minna De Sakura O Tasuke Tai" (Japanese: みんなで桜おたすけ隊)	September 5, 2019
53	"Hundred of Cocotama Achieved?"; Transliteration: "Kokotama 100-ri Tassei?" (Japanese: ここたま100人達成？)	September 12, 2019
54	"Onwards! Sakura Town Protection Squad!!"; Transliteration: "Susume! Sakurachou Mamori Tai!!" (Japanese: すすめ！桜町まもり隊！！)	September 19, 2019
55	"Save Sakura Town, Open! The Door Of Happiness"; Transliteration: "Sukue Sakurachou Hirake! Shiawase No Tobira" (Japanese: 救え桜町 ひらけ！幸せの扉)	September 26, 2019
