= Katsuya Matsumura =

Japanese film director and screenwriter (born 1963)

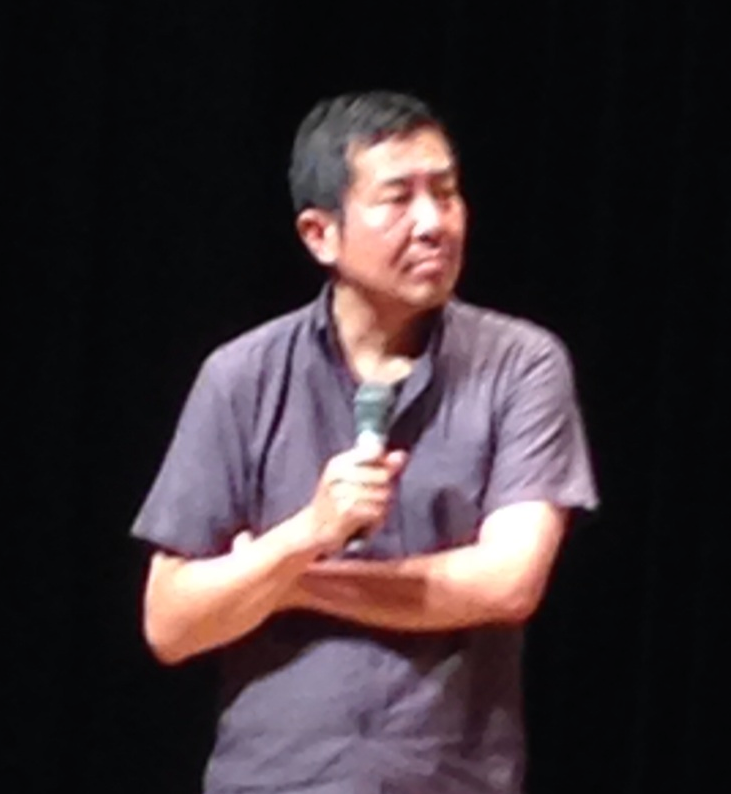
- Matsumura in 2014
- Born: 1963 (age 62–63); Tokyo, Japan
- Occupations: Film director Screenwriter
- Years active: 1988–present

Katsuya Matsumura (松村克弥, Matsumura Katsuya) is a Japanese film director and screenwriter known for his violent thriller-horror film series All Night Long.

== Life and career ==
Matsumura was born in Tokyo, Japan in 1963. After graduating college, he entered the film industry where he worked on documentary films and short documentaries. His documentary on continued pollution in the Doroku area won the grand prize in the Short Film category at the Mainichi Film Concours in 1988. He left documentary film making in 1991 and his first feature film All Night Long was released in 1992. The film earned him the Best New Director award at the 1993 Yokohama Film Festival.

He followed up his first feature with the 1995 horror film Concrete-Encased High School Girl Murder Case, based on a true crime, the 1988-89 murder of Junko Furuta. Matsumura continued the "All Night Long" series with two more installments released directly to video in 1995 and 1996, followed by the 4th and 5th chapters later in 2002 and 2003, also on video.

Matsumura returned to feature films with the 2004 horror movie Ki-re-i?, based on the novel by Kei Yuikawa, which combines cosmetic surgery and gore, and in 2008, he directed Dark Love: Rape, an erotic psycho-thriller from the manga series Rape (レイプ, Reipu) by Shūichi Sakabe. The film was produced and distributed by the adult video (AV) studio KM Produce and featured one of their former actresses Hitomi Hayasaka.

In 2009, Matsumura brought out All Night Long 6, produced by Takashi Shimizu, famous for his Ju-on (The Grudge) films, and with special makeup effects by Yoshihiro Nishimura. The film was shown February 28, 2009 at the Yubari International Fantastic Film Festival.

== Filmography ==
Sources:

- All Night Long (オールナイトロング, Ooru naito rongu), 1992
- Concrete-Encased High School Girl Murder Case (女子高生コンクリート詰め殺人事件, Joshikōsei konkurīto-zume satsujin-jiken), 1995
- All Night Long 2 (オールナイトロング２, Ooru naito rongu 2), 1995 (video)
- All Night Long 3: The Final Chapter (オールナイトロング３ 最終章, Ooru naito rongu 3: Saishuu-shö), 1996 (video)
- All Night Long R (オールナイトロングＲ, Ooru naito rongu R), 2002 (video)
- All Night Long: Initial O (オールナイトロング イニシャルＯ, Ooru naito rongu: Inisharu O), 2003 (video)
- Ki-re-i? (き・れ・い？, Ki-re-i?), 2004
- Dark Love: Rape (ダーク・ラブ～Rape～, Dāku rabu: Rape), 2008
- All Night Long: Anyone Would Have Done (ALL NIGHT LONG -誰でもよかった-, ALL NIGHT LONG: Daredemo yokatta), 2009

== Sources ==
- "Katsuya Matsumura at IMdB". IMDb. Archived from the original on 2017-02-18.
- "Katsuya Matsumura at JMDB" (in Japanese). Archived from the original on 2012-10-21.
- "Katsuya Matsumura at All Cinema" (in Japanese). Archived from the original on 2012-10-18.
- "Review of All Night Long". Archived from the original on 2010-04-02.
- "Review of All Night Long 2".
- "Review of Kirei?". 29 July 2020. Archived from the original on 11 July 2009.
