= Little Witch Academia =

2013 Japanese anime franchise

- Promotional artwork for the original film

リトルウィッチアカデミア (Ritoru Witchi Akademia)
- Genre: Coming-of-age; Magical fantasy; Magical girl
- Created by: Yoh Yoshinari
Further information
Anime film
Directed by	Yoh Yoshinari
Produced by	Naoko Tsutsumi
Written by	Masahiko Otsuka
Music by	Michiru Ōshima
Studio	Studio Trigger
Licensed by	NA: Acttil
Released	March 2, 2013
Runtime	26 minutes
Manga
Written by	Terio Teri
Published by	Shueisha
Magazine	Ultra Jump
Published	August 19, 2013
Manga
Written by	Terio Teri
Published by	Shueisha
Imprint	Young Jump Comics
Magazine	Ultra Jump
Original run	August 19, 2015 – November 20, 2015
Volumes	1
Anime film
Little Witch Academia: The Enchanted Parade
Directed by	Yoh Yoshinari
Produced by	Naoko Tsutsumi
Written by	Michiru Shimada
Music by	Michiru Ōshima
Studio	Trigger
Released	October 9, 2015
Runtime	53 minutes
Manga
Little Witch Academia: Tsukiyo no Ōkan
Written by	Yuka Fujiwara
Published by	Shueisha
Magazine	Ribon
Original run	September 3, 2015 – December 28, 2015
Volumes	1
Anime television series
Directed by	Yoh Yoshinari
Produced by	Yoshihiro Furusawa; Yoshiki Usa; Kimi Suzuki
Written by	Michiru Shimada
Music by	Michiru Ōshima
Studio	Trigger
Licensed by	Netflix (streaming rights)
Original network	Tokyo MX, BS11, KTV
Original run	January 9, 2017 – June 26, 2017
Episodes	25
Manga
Written by	Yoh Yoshinari
Illustrated by	Keisuke Sato
Published by	Kadokawa Shoten
English publisher	NA: Yen Press
Magazine	Monthly Shōnen Ace
Original run	January 26, 2017 – September 2018
Volumes	3
Light novel
Little Witch Academia: The Nonsensical Witch and the Country of Fairies
Written by	Momo Tachibana
Illustrated by	Eku Uekura
Published by	Kadokawa Shoten
English publisher	NA: Yen Press
Published	April 15, 2017
Volumes	1
Video games
Little Witch Academia: Chamber of Time; Little Witch Academia: VR Broom Racing
- icon

Little Witch Academia (Japanese: リトルウィッチアカデミア, Hepburn: Ritoru Witchi Akademia) is a Japanese anime franchise created by Yoh Yoshinari and produced by Studio Trigger. The original short film, directed by Yoshinari and written by Masahiko Otsuka, was released in theaters in March 2013 as part of the Young Animator Training Project's Anime Mirai 2013 project, and was later streamed with English subtitles on YouTube from April 2013. A second short film partially funded through Kickstarter, Little Witch Academia: The Enchanted Parade, was released in October 2015.

An anime television series aired in Japan between January and June 2017, with the first 13 episodes available on Netflix worldwide beginning in June of that same year, while the remaining 12 were made available in August. Two manga series adaptations have been published by Shueisha.

== Story ==
Little Witch Academia takes place at Luna Nova Magical Academy (ルーナノヴァ魔法学校, Rūna Nova Mahō Gakkō), a prestigious school for young girls training to become witches. Having been inspired by a witch named Shiny Chariot, a girl named Atsuko "Akko" Kagari enrolls at Luna Nova Magical Academy to become a witch, but struggles due to her non-magical background. This all changes when she discovers the Shiny Rod, a powerful magic relic left behind by Chariot.

One of the main themes in the series is Akko trying to live up to Shiny Chariot's ideals by showing the world that magic is still a wonderful thing, while Luna Nova struggles for its continual existence because the general public regards wizardry as outdated. In the TV series, this background element is expanded into a plotline in which magic is waning across the world. The secret to restoring the flow of magic lies within the forbidden Arcturus Forest, sealed inside a magical locale named the Grand Triskellion erected by the Nine Olde Witches, the legendary founders of the academy.

The key to undoing the seal lies in a sequence of seven magical words and the Shiny Rod, an artifact which reacts only to the wielder's genuine desire to spread joy and happiness. When Akko gains possession of the Rod, Chariot (secretly one of her Luna Nova teachers and the Rod's previous wielder) tries to guide her on the path to restoring the power of magic to the world. However, Croix, Chariot's former best friend, had also coveted – and was denied – the power sealed within the Grand Triskellion due to her selfish ambitions. As a result, she schemes to unlock the Grand Triskellion by force with use of artifacts powered by negative emotions she developed with her technomagical abilities and try to deter both Akko and her rival along the way.

== Characters ==
Atsuko "Akko" Kagari (カガリ アツコ (アッコ), Kagari Atsuko (Akko))
Voiced by: Megumi Han (Japanese); Erica Mendez (English)
Akko is a hyperactive, optimistic, and very impulsive Japanese girl who attends Luna Nova after being inspired by the witch Shiny Chariot. Having come from a non-magical background, she struggles using magic much of the time, and is disappointed by the mundanity of her classes as opposed to Chariot's more spectacular performances. However, her unshakable belief in magic and her genuine desire to use it for good enables her to wield the Shiny Rod, which accepts her as its new master, and gradually discover her own magical talent.
Lotte Jansson (ロッテ・ヤンソン, Rotte Yanson)
Voiced by: Fumiko Orikasa (Japanese); Stephanie Sheh (English)
Akko's friend and roommate, a kind and soft-spoken Finnish witch who worries about Akko's well-being. She has orange hair and wears lower-framed glasses. Her magical specialty involves summoning and communicating with fairies and spirits residing in old, well-used items.
Sucy Manbavaran (スーシィ・マンババラン, Sūshi Manbabaran)
Voiced by: Michiyo Murase (Japanese); Rachelle Heger, Anastasia Muñoz (Space Patrol Luluco) (English)
Akko's other friend and roommate, a cynical, mischievous witch from the Philippines who specializes in brewing potions with various bizarre effects. She often uses Akko as a test subject, or to help her in gathering the poisonous or hazardous ingredients (mushrooms in particular) she needs.
Professor Ursula (アーシュラ先生, Āshura-sensei) / Chariot du Nord (シャリオ・デュノール, Shario dyu Nōru)
Voiced by: Noriko Hidaka (Japanese); Alexis Nichols (English)
Ursula Callistis (アーシュラ・カリスティス, Āshura Karisutisu) is an astronomy teacher at Luna Nova whose real identity is Chariot du Nord, a famous witch and alumna of Luna Nova who performed under the alias Shiny Chariot (シャイニィシャリオ, Shainii Shario) and inspired Akko to become a witch. Her chosen mission was to use her magic skills to bring joy to people's hearts. She mysteriously disappeared from the public eye ten years ago after her former friend Croix tricked her into employing a sinister type of magic, which stripped Akko of her latent magical powers as a child. Now living and teaching incognito at Luna Nova, she takes Akko as a personal student after she notices her strong desire to become a witch, which enables her to use the Shiny Rod and unseal the lost seven words to the Grand Triskellion, in order to make up for her guilt. She used her magic to hide herself by altering her appearance, masking her brilliant red hue with a deep, dark blue.
Diana Cavendish (ダイアナ・キャベンディッシュ, Daiana Kyabendisshu)
Voiced by: Yoko Hikasa (Japanese); Laura Post (English)
The top student of Luna Nova who is greatly admired by her classmates and teachers alike. She has light blue eyes and blond hair with green highlights. Hailing from Great Britain as daughter of a declining noble family of witches, she has a serious and arrogant nature and oftentimes clashes with Akko, whom she holds in disdain for her impulsive nature and admiration of Shiny Chariot. Despite this, Diana is secretly a childhood fan of Chariot herself, and gradually develops a grudging respect for Akko.
Amanda O'Neill (アマンダ・オニール, Amanda Onīru)
Voiced by: Arisa Shida (Japanese); Marin Miller (English)
A delinquent Luna Nova witch student from the United States who has a penchant for stealing priceless artifacts and magical objects that catch her fancy. She excels at dancing and performing aerobatic stunts on her broomstick.
Constanze Amalie von Braunschbank Albrechtsberger (コンスタンツェ・アマーリエ・フォン・ブラウンシュバンク=アルブレヒツベルガー, Konsutantse Amārie fon Buraunshubanku-Aruburehitsuberugā)
Voiced by: Rie Murakawa (Japanese); Jennifer Alyx (English)
A silent, grumpy-looking German Luna Nova witch student who combines magic with machinery such as robots and laser guns, which are typically forbidden on the school premises. In the TV series, she has even set up a secret workshop in a disused part of the academy, which can only be entered by means of her own bed.
Jasminka Antonenko (ヤスミンカ・アントネンコ, Yasuminka Antonenko)
Voiced by: Reina Ueda (Japanese); Stephanie Sheh (English)
A friendly and laid-back Luna Nova witch student from Russia who has a passion for food and is always seen snacking on something, even during classes. She specializes in culinary magic.
Croix Meridies (クロワ・メリディエス, Kurowa Meridiesu)
Voiced by: Junko Takeuchi (Japanese); Caitlyn Elizabeth (English)
The main villainess of the television series. A new teacher at Luna Nova Magical Academy who specializes in technomagic. She was once close friends with Chariot and previously helped her in searching for the Grand Triskellion's words, but grew spiteful towards her over not being chosen to wield the Shiny Rod.

== Media ==
=== Manga ===
A one-shot manga based on the anime and drawn by Terio Teri was published in Shueisha's Ultra Jump magazine on August 19, 2013. Another manga by Teri, featuring an original story, was serialized in Ultra Jump between August 19, 2015, and November 20, 2015, and was compiled into a single tankōbon volume released on January 19, 2016.

Another series illustrated by Yuka Fujiwara, Little Witch Academia: Tsukiyo no Ōkan (リトルウィッチアカデミア 月夜の王冠; lit. 'Little Witch Academia: The Midnight Crown'), began serialization in Shueisha's Ribon magazine from September 3 to December 28, 2015. Shueisha released a compiled tankōbon volume on February 25, 2016.

=== Anime ===
==== Short films ====
Little Witch Academia was produced by Studio Trigger as part of the Young Animator Training Project's Anime Mirai 2013 project, which funds young animators, alongside other short films by Madhouse, Zexcs, and Gonzo. The short was created and directed by Yoh Yoshinari and written by Masahiko Otsuka, with music by Michiru Ōshima. The short, along with the other Anime Mirai shorts, opened in 14 Japanese theatres on March 2, 2013. Trigger later released the short on Niconico and with English subtitles on YouTube and Crunchyroll on April 19, 2013. The short was later released on region-free Blu-ray on October 24, 2013.

On July 5, 2013, Trigger announced at Anime Expo that a second short film, titled Little Witch Academia: The Enchanted Parade, would be developed in response to the reception the first short received. The project began production in 2014 following the airing of Kill la Kill. Whilst initially having the funds for a twenty-minute episode, Trigger launched a Kickstarter campaign to extend its runtime to 40 minutes. The Kickstarter was launched on July 9, 2013, and met its US$150,000 goal within five hours, finishing with a total of $625,518. The short premiered at Anime Expo 2015, and was made available for Kickstarter backers on July 3, 2015, before it was subsequently released in Japanese theaters on October 9 of that year. Both films were later released on Netflix with an English-language dub on December 15, 2015. However, both films were removed from Netflix in the United States on October 9, 2019.

No.	Title	Original release date
F1	"Little Witch Academia"; Transliteration: "Ritoru Witchi Akademia" (Japanese: リトルウィッチアカデミア)	March 2, 2013
Atsuko "Akko" Kagari enrolls into Luna Nova Magical Academy, a school for young witches, after being inspired at a young age by a witch named Shiny Chariot. Akko often spends her days hanging out with her classmates Lotte Jansson and Sucy Manbavaran. However, she has trouble paying attention in class and flying a broom, and is often looked down upon for admiring Shiny Chariot, whom many believe gives the wrong impression about witches. One day, as magic astrology teacher Ursula instructs the class to explore a dungeon and retrieve rare treasures, Akko finds a staff called the Shiny Rod that belonged to Shiny Chariot long ago. Meanwhile, the top student Diana Cavendish inadvertently breaks a seal on a dragon that grows more powerful by absorbing magic. Noticing that the Shiny Rod still has power after all these years, Ursula sends Akko to reach the Sorcerer's Stone, a magical artifact as the source of the academy's power, before the dragon can devour it and become invincible. Arriving at the Sorcerer's Stone, the Shiny Rod absorbs some of its power, allowing Akko to fight against the dragon. Put into a desperate situation, Akko hears Shiny Chariot's words coming from somewhere, telling her to never forget that a believing heart is magic. With renewed conviction, Akko uses the full power of the Shiny Rod to destroy the dragon.
F2	"Little Witch Academia: The Enchanted Parade"; Transliteration: "Ritoru Witchi Akademia: Mahōjikake no Parēdo" (Japanese: リトルウィッチアカデミア 魔法仕掛けのパレード)	October 9, 2015
After a mishap of mixing a mushroom and a fairy in a kettle during class resulting in catastrophe, Akko, Lotte and Sucy are forced by magic linguistics teacher Anne Finnelan to cooperate with three other troublemaking students named Amanda O'Neill, Constanze Amalie von Braunschbank Albrechtsberger and Jasminka Antonenko. The six of them are all tasked to make the school's annual witch parade in town a success or else be expelled for the school year. Not content with how the festival revolves around the mockery and subjugation of witches, Akko becomes determined to make the festival a spectacle that would show off how awesome modern witches are and dispel their negative reputation. As Akko's ambitions for the parade grow, she ends up arguing with Lotte and Sucy, who do not share her positive ideas. However, Akko remains determined to prove Shiny Chariot's ideals of magic to everyone, coming up with the idea of fireworks and dancing brooms on a wooden ship, as well as using the Shiny Rod to borrow some magic from the Sorcerer's Stone for the parade. During the parade, Thomas, the leader of a gang of delinquent kids, tries to steal the Shiny Rod, only to be caught by a titan that was once sealed away under a park long ago, which brings man-made devices to life. Luckily, Akko is assisted by Amanda, Constanze and Jasminka, including the return of Sucy as well as Lotte. Making up with each other, Akko, Lotte and Sucy combine their power of the Shiny Rod and put a stop to the titan, resulting in the parade becoming a great success.

==== Television series ====
An anime television series of Little Witch Academia was announced on June 24, 2016, following the final episode of Space Patrol Luluco. The series aired in Japan between January 9, 2017, and June 26, 2017. For the first cour, the opening theme is "Shiny Ray" by Yurika, while the ending theme is "Hoshi o Tadoreba" (星を辿れば, If You Follow the Stars) by Yuiko Ōhara. For the second cour, the opening theme is "Mind Conductor" by YURiKA, while the ending theme is "Tōmei na Tsubasa" (透明な翼, Invisible Wings) by Ōhara. The series ran for 25 episodes released across nine Blu-ray/DVD volumes. Netflix began streaming the first 13 episodes with an English dub on June 30, 2017; The remaining 12 episodes began streaming on August 15.

During an interview, Yoh Yoshinari stated that he and Trigger had been planning a second season for a year, with them ultimately falling through, leading to Yoshinari directing BNA: Brand New Animal.

=== Video game ===
A video game developed by A+ Games and published by Bandai Namco Entertainment, titled Little Witch Academia: Chamber of Time (リトルウィッチアカデミア 時の魔法と七不思議, Ritoru Witchi Akademia: Toki no Mahō to Nana Fushigi; lit. Little Witch Academia: The Magic of Time and the Seven Wonders), was released on PlayStation 4 on November 30, 2017, in Japan, followed by a PS4 and Steam release in North America in early 2018. A bonus game, Madō Senshi Gran Sharion (魔導戦士グランシャリオン, Magical Warrior Gran Sharion), is available in Japan as a pre-order bonus.

Another video game, this time in form of a VR game titled 'Little Witch Academia: VR Broom Racing' by UNIVRS and funded by Kickstarter, was announced on June 20, 2019. The game was originally planned to be released in June 2020, but ultimately postponed to October 13, 2020, in the light of COVID-19 pandemic.

=== Other appearances ===
A crossover short featuring characters from both Little Witch Academia and Inferno Cop premiered at AnimeNEXT 2015 on June 13, 2015, and was also shown at Anime Expo 2015 on July 2, 2015. Both Akko (in episode 13) and Sucy (episode 8) make guest appearances in Trigger's 2016 anime series Space Patrol Luluco.

More recently, the series appeared in the mobile game Super Robot Wars X-Ω as a limited-time event. The story features Akko and her friends hunting fairies in a forest when they are transported to another world. There, they join the characters of Aura Battler Dunbine and Gurren Lagann in their respective stories while finding their way back to Luna Nova.

== Reception ==
In 2019, Crunchyroll listed Little Witch Academia in their "Top 100 best anime of the 2010s", describing it as a "charming coming-of-age story". IGN also listed Little Witch Academia among the best anime series of the 2010s. Emily Ashby of Common Sense Media described the series as having strong messages about "self-confidence and perseverance", but warned about scary creatures. Even so, she praised the show's portrayal of "loyalty and craftiness" as positive character traits, and said that the series would "appeal to viewers with a soft spot for underdogs".

== See also ==
- List of films about witchcraft
