= All Night Long 3 =

- Directed by: Katsuya Matsumura
- Release date: August 9, 1996 (Japan)
- Running time: 83 minutes
- Country: Japan
- Language: Japanese

All Night Long 3 (オールナイトロング3 最終章, All Night Long 3 Saishu Sho) is a 1996 Japanese original video horror film directed by Katsuya Matsumura, released on August 9, 1996.

== Cast ==
- Tomorowo Taguchi
- Yuji Kitagawa as Kikuo Sawada
- Ryôka Yuzuki as Hitomi Nomura
- Tomorô Taguchi as Kawasaki

== Reception ==
Of Midnight Eye, Tom Mes said the Japanese-language film was "the best realised [of the trilogy] and the most relentless".

== See also ==
- All Night Long (1992 film)
- All Night Long 2 (1995)
