= BLACKFOX: Age of the Ninja =

- Directed by: Koichi Sakamoto
- Screenplay by: Naoki Hayashi
- Produced by: Miyagawa Tomoyuki
- Starring: Chihiro Yamamoto
- Music by: fripSide
- Release date: 5 October 2019
- Running time: 93 minutes
- Country: Japan
- Language: Japanese/English

BLACKFOX: Age of the Ninja is a 2019 Japanese film directed by Koichi Sakamoto and starring Chihiro Yamamoto in her first cinematic leading role. It is a tokusatsu action period film that was produced as a live-action spin-off of the anime film BLACKFOX, which opened in theaters on 5 October 2019. BLACKFOX: Age of the Ninja is a prequel to the anime film, as its main character Rikka Isurugi – a female ninja who fought during the Edo period – is the ancestor of the main character of the anime film. The screenplay was written by Naoki Hayashi, who also wrote the screenplay for the anime film.

== Synopsis ==
The film takes place in Japan during the age of Samurai and Ninja. Rikka Isurugi, who was raised to be the next head of the Kitsune (Fox) – a ninja clan that does anything for the right price – meets a girl named Miya, who had been wandering around in the mountains looking for the Kitsune.

Miya, whose father was murdered by a gang called the Negoroshu, places an order to Hyoe Isurugi – Rikka's grandfather and the head of the ninja clan – to have the Negoroshu killed. As a naturally gentle person, Rikka has a problem with killing people. As such, she tries to convince Hyoe to change his mind about accepting the job, but right when she is doing so, the Negoroshu come attacking after Miya.

The hard fight ends in a draw, but as punishment for questioning the head's decision, Rikka is later made to attend to meager tasks. Seeing Rikka clumsily taking on the work, Miya steps in to help, and as the two work together, they become friends. Meanwhile however, an unknown character advances their evil plot as they continue to use the Negoroshu to attack Miya.

== Cast ==
- Chihiro Yamamoto as Rikka Isurugi
- Maimi Yajima as Miya
- Sakurako Okubo as Merisa
- Mami Fujioka as Haku
- Yuki Kubota as Shigetsugu Toda
- Hideo Ishiguro as Burado
- Kanon Miyahara as Uto
- Masayuki Deai as Jin
- Koji Nakamura as Kokuryū
- Kentaro Shimazu as Aren
- Ayaka Nanase as Riri
- Seizō Fukumoto as Sorcerer
- Takeshi Masu as Roren
- Yasuaki Kurata as Hyoe Isurugi

== Music ==
Theme song: My Own Way
Lyrics, music, and arrangement by Satoshi Yaginuma Produced by Jun Nishimura (NBC Universal Entertainment Japan) Performed by fripSide

== Release ==
The film was released on more than 20 video platforms in Japan on 5 October 2019.

The film was presented in the Special Invitation category of the 2019 Kyoto International Film Festival, and made its world premiere on 19 October 2019. On 1 December 2019, the film made its Tokyo debut at the 29th Tama Cinema Forum.

On 13 and 14 December 2019, the film was screened in Taipei, Taiwan at the Syntrend Creative Park, a facility that features household electric appliances. On 16 December, the film was screened at Shinjuku Wald 9 in Tokyo.

The film was released on Blu-ray and DVD on 18 December.
