= Blackfox =

- Promotional art for the film
- Directed by: Kazuya Nomura (Note: Chief Director (総監督)); Keisuke Shinohara
- Screenplay by: Naoki Hayashi
- Produced by: Hitoshi Kawamura; Mitsutoshi Ogura; Shinji Oomori; Motohiro Oda; Nobuhiko Kurosu; Manami Ishida; Yuki Uekusa; Michiko Fujii
- Starring: Ayaka Nanase; Haruka Tomatsu; Yō Taichi; Hiroshi Tsuchida; Eizō Tsuda; Keiji Fujiwara; Aki Toyosaki; Kōsuke Toriumi; Nobuo Tobita; Hiroki Tōchi; Rikiya Koyama
- Cinematography: Yu Wakabayashi
- Edited by: Gō Sadamatsu
- Music by: Masaru Yokoyama; Kana Hashiguchi
- Production companies: Studio 3Hz; Infinite
- Release dates: October 4, 2019 (Crunchyroll); October 5, 2019 (Japan)
- Running time: 90 minutes
- Country: Japan
- Language: Japanese

Blackfox is a Japanese anime film produced by studio 3Hz. It premiered in Japan on October 5, 2019.

== Plot ==
Rikka Isurugi is a young girl living at her family home at the edge of Brad City. She is the descendant of ninjas and is expected to follow in the steps of her grandfather, Hyoei Isurugi, and become the next family head. However she wants to be like her father, Allen Isurugi, a renowned robot scientist. One day, Rikka returns home from school for her birthday to find it being attacked by a hit squad led by her father's former colleague, Lauren, intent on obtaining his research, including three AI robotic animal drones: Kasumi the eagle, Oboro the dog and Madara the flying squirrel. Hyoei tries to fight back, only to be restrained and mortally wounded by Lauren's daughter, an esper who is under his control through an electronic collar. Allen is shot and dies, but the drones take Rikka to safety, where she vows to avenge her family.

Six months later, Rikka is now going under the alias "Lily" and is living in a small apartment with her roommate, Melissa. She works as a detective-in-training for Harold Berkeley and uses the animal drones to find information about her family's murderers which are linked to the Gradsheim company. Lily observes one of their facilities, but is caught by security. She is fortunately helped out by a girl named Mia, who vouches for her, and the two become fast friends. That night, Lily infiltrates the facility to retrieve her father's research. However, she is caught by Lauren and the esper, who's revealed to be Mia. Upon discovering Lily's identity, Lauren orders Mia to kill her, but she resists his control and goes berserk; destroying the facility and allowing Lily to flee with her.

The animal drones prevent Lily from killing Mia, and she takes Mia to her apartment where Melissa helps her recuperate. Lauren sends a military drone created using Allen's AI research to kill Lily, but together Lily and Mia lure the drone to Lily's home, where they disable it using the house's ninja traps. Lauren then attacks them and destroys the house using esper powers gained from his research on Mia. Mia fights him but is defeated, while Lily finds a recording of her father and grandfather, wishing her a happy birthday and giving her a present: a "Black Fox" ninja suit with cybernetic enhancements. Once again embracing her true identity as "Rikka," she dons the suit and defeats Lauren. However, he then puts the electronic control collar on Mia and transfers his powers to her, killing himself in the process, causing her to attack Rikka. In the end, with the help of the animal drones, Rikka manages to destroy the collar and free Mia.

Later, the president of Gradsheim, Brad Ingram, holds a press conference where he denies any involvement in the incident with the military drone, but Rikka recognizes him as the mastermind behind the attack on her family. Rikka, now going by the codename "Black Fox", with the aid of Mia, Melissa, and the animal drones, plans to go after Brad next.

== Characters ==
Rikka Isurugi (石動 律花)
Voiced by: Ayaka Nanase
The main protagonist, a ninja and detective in training. She eventually becomes the "Black Fox".
Mia (ミア)
Voiced by: Haruka Tomatsu
An esper girl exploited by her father Lauren for his research. His experiments strengthened her ability and turned her into a powerful telekinetic.
Melissa (メリッサ)
Voiced by: Yō Taichi
Rikka's roommate. Also known as AMD00, the first drone created by Rikka's father.
Allen Isurugi (アレン, Aren)
Voiced by: Hiroshi Tsuchida
Rikka's father and an accomplished scientist. Creator of Melissa, Oboro, Madara and Kasumi.
Hyōei Isurugi (兵衛, Hyōei)
Voiced by: Eizō Tsuda
Rikka's grandfather and the 26th head of the Isurugi clan. He trained Rikka to be a ninja.
Kasumi (カスミ)
Voiced by: Kōsuke Toriumi
An eagle drone who serves Rikka; also known as AMD01.
Oboro (オボロ)
Voiced by: Keiji Fujiwara
A dog drone who serves Rikka; also known as AMD02.
Madara (マダラ)
Voiced by: Aki Toyosaki
A flying squirrel drone who serves Rikka; also known as AMD03.
Lauren (ローレン, Rōren)
Voiced by: Nobuo Tobita
A scientist for Gradsheim and Allen's former colleague. Driven insane by his jealousy of Allen's success, he is determined to steal his research and ruin his reputation.
Brad Ingram (ブラッド, Buraddo)
Voiced by: Hiroki Tōchi
The president of Gradsheim and mayor of Brad City. Allen's former colleague.
Harold Berkeley (ハロルド, Harorudo)
Voiced by: Rikiya Koyama
Head of the detective agency where Rikka works.

== Production and release ==
The film is produced by studio 3Hz, and directed by Keisuke Shinohara and written by Naoki Hayashi, with Kazuya Nomura serving as chief director. Atsushi Saito is providing the character designs. Infinite is producing the film. Art designers for the series include Fumihiro Katagai (mechanical design), Kenji Andō (Animaldrone design), Ryō Akizuki (prop design), and Yūho Taniuchi, Moriyoshi Ōhara, Atsushi Morikawa, Jyu Ishiguchi, and Kō Kawamura (background design). Background art is provided by Aoshashin. Yūji Kaneko is the series art director. Yukie Noguchi is the colorist, and Hirofumi Araki is the graphic artist. Shunsaku Usui is directing the 3DCG at Flying Ship Studio. T2 Studio is compositing the film, and Gō Sadamatsu is the film's editor. Masaru Yokoyama and Kana Hashiguchi are composing the music.

Crunchyroll streamed the film on their website on October 4, 2019, in all territories, except Asia, France, Germany, Italy, the rest of Europe and Russia. The film premiered in Japanese theaters on October 5, 2019.

A live action tokusatsu drama film titled BLACKFOX: Age of the Ninja, written by Hayashi and directed by stunt coordinator Koichi Sakamoto, was released on October 5, 2019. The film is set in the past during the age of ninja and samurai and focuses on Rikka Isurugi, a girl raised by a ninja clan secluded from society, and a girl with mysterious powers named Miya.
