= All Night Long (1992 film) =

- Ooru naito rongu
- Directed by: Katsuya Matsumura
- Written by: Katsuya Matsumura
- Produced by: Tetsuya Ikeda
- Starring: Eisuke Tsunoda; Ryōsuke Suzuki; Yōji Ietomi
- Cinematography: Satoshi Murakawa
- Music by: Katsuhiko Akiyama; Tatsunori Iwanaga
- Distributed by: Kadokawa Pictures
- Release date: November 14, 1992 (Japan)
- Running time: 90 minutes
- Country: Japan
- Language: Japanese

All Night Long (Japanese: オールナイトロング, Hepburn: Ooru naito rongu) is a 1992 Japanese film directed by Katsuya Matsumura. It is the first in a series of six films. Matsumura won an award for best new director at the 14th Yokohama Film Festival for this film.

== Plot ==
Three teenagers witness the brutal murder of a high school girl by an insane salaryman. The teenagers find themselves united by this event and become friends. Later the teenagers hold a party to take their mind off things. Their party is crashed by a local gang of thugs and one teenager finds his newly found girlfriend being raped. The teenagers deal with the thugs by using extreme violence.

== Cast ==
- Eisuke Tsunoda as Suzuki Kensuke
- Ryōsuke Suzuki as Saitô Shinji
- Yōji Ietomi as Tanaka Tetsuya
- Hiromasa Taguchi as Tamari
- Third Nagashima as Phantom Killer
- Sachiko Wakayama as Yoshiko
- Yumi Goto as Eri
- Ayumi Nagashii as Girl at the train crossing
- Yumi Kayama as Yôko
- Kenichi Mōri as Delinquent Leader
- Keiichi Mano
- Tomoyuki Shimada
- Makoto Ogawa
- Tomorowo Taguchi as Airline Manager
- Rusher Kimura as Industrial High School Teacher

== Release ==
The film has been released on DVD in the Netherlands on the Japan Shock label. It has been released on DVD in the US by Tokyo Shock and in Japan on both VHS and DVD by Kadokawa Pictures (as Daiei Motion Picture Company). Prior to it receiving a DVD release with English subtitles it was heavily distributed on the Video Tape exchange circuit.

== See also ==
- All Night Long 2 (1995)
- All Night Long 3 (1996)
