= All Night Long 2 =

- Directed by: Katsuya Matsumura
- Release date: February 10, 1995 (Japan)
- Running time: 76 minutes
- Country: Japan
- Language: Japanese

All Night Long 2 (オールナイトロング２) is a 1995 Japanese original video horror film directed by Katsuya Matsumura. It was released on February 10, 1995.

== Cast ==
- Masahito Takahashi
- Masashi Endo as Shun'ichi Noda
- Takamitsu Okubo
- Ryoka Yuzuki as Sayaka Mizukami

== Reception ==
On Midnight Eye, Tom Mes said the film "is still not a masterpiece by any standards" "but it certainly packs a serious punch".

== See also ==
- All Night Long (1992 film)
- All Night Long 3 (1996)
