= Little Witch Academia: Chamber of Time =

2017 action role-playing video game

- Developer: A+ Games
- Publisher: Bandai Namco Entertainment
- Series: Little Witch Academia
- Engine: Unity
- Platforms: PlayStation 4, Microsoft Windows
- Release: JP: 30 November 2017; WW: 15 May 2018
- Genre: Action role-playing

Little Witch Academia: Chamber of Time (Note: Known in Japan as Little Witch Academia: Toki no Mahō to Nana Fushigi (リトルウィッチアカデミア 時の魔法と七不思議)) is an action role-playing video game developed by A+ Games and published by Bandai Namco Entertainment, based on the anime franchise Little Witch Academia.

The game was released on the PlayStation 4 in Japan in November 2017, and worldwide for PlayStation 4 and Microsoft Windows on 15 May 2018.

== Gameplay ==
The side-scrolling action game lets players control the anime's protagonist, witch-in-training Akko, accompanied by her friends Sucy, Lotte, Amanda, Constanze, Jasminka and Diana, as she explores her magical academy. There are two distinct game modes: a 3D adventure-style exploration of the school, and a 2.5D action mode involving the exploration of magical labyrinths with three characters.

A limited edition with additional material, including an audio drama and an artbook, was released in Japan. The game features animated cutscenes by Trigger, the creators of the anime series. Scores from the series' original soundtrack are included in the game as well.

== Plot ==
It's the first day of summer vacation at the Luna Nova Magic Academy, but after getting into trouble once again, Akko is sentenced by Professor Finnelan to clean up the school's library. While working on the library, Akko discovers a hidden door leading to a secret place called the "Holorogium Chamber" where she finds a magic door leading to a mysterious world. In the next day, Akko and her friends Sucy and Lotte find out that the previous day is repeating itself continuously, and certain that it is related to the Holorogium Chamber being unsealed, with assistance from Diana, Amanda, Jasminka and Constanze, they try several ways to seal the chamber and return the flux of time to normal with no success.

Along the way, Akko and her companion stumbled upon Seven Wonders of Luna Nova, seven different anomalies that take place after the unsealing of Horologium Chamber. Initially believing the phenomenon to be the least of their concern, the significance between it and Horologium Chamber becomes increasingly evident the more Akko solved them all, as each solved anomaly granted Akko a new magic key which powers enable the group to travel to different regions by using them on the Sealed Door of Horologium Chamber. After running away of options, Diana concludes that solving the final anomaly is the only way to restore the flow of time for good.

While in the middle of investigating the last anomaly of Seven Wonders, Akko meets and befriends Molly McIntyre who curious with the Seven Wonders. However, it soon comes to light that Molly is a witch whose powers were sealed 200 years ago in the Holorogium Chamber, and with the chamber unsealed, she regained her memories and powers. Assisted by Professor Ursula, Akko and her friends locate and defeat Molly inside the chamber and learn from her that she once was a young witch who had no talent with magic and no friends, and used the powers of the Holorogium Chamber to repeat time over and over again as she practiced her magic to increase her abilities, but despite that, she failed to make new friends and after attempting to repeat the entire year using her powers, she transformed herself into a monster, which was sealed by the teachers at the time, and since then she attended the school year after year for centuries, always forgetting the events of the previous year.

After the Holorogium Chamber is sealed again, Akko finishes her task of cleaning up the library with help from her friends, and finally begins enjoying her summer vacation with the others. In the post-credits, Akko rejoices that Molly, now free from the curse, is also enjoying life with her own friends.

== Reception ==
Reception

Aggregate score
Aggregator	Score
Metacritic	(PS4) 58/100

Review scores
Publication	Score
Computer Games Magazine	6/10
Destructoid	4/10
Hardcore Gamer	3.5/5
Push Square	7/10
RPGamer	2/5

The PS4 version of the game received a score of 58 out of 100 on Metacritic, indicating "mixed or average reviews".

Destructoid's reviewer noted that while the "characters, story, script and voice-acting are fantastic", the game was a "disappointment" because of the unexciting and unnecessarily complicated and laborious gameplay. According to Hideaki Mizota, this was attributed to the developers unable to fully integrate all elements that made the game faithful to the series prior to the deadline. IGN Japan rated the game 81 out of 100, commenting that "if you can live with average gameplay there is plenty to enjoy here".
