= Ayaka Nanase =

Japanese voice actress

- 七瀬 彩夏
- Born: July 11, 1994 (age 32); Tokyo, Japan
- Occupation: Voice actress
- Years active: 2015–present
- Agent: Axl-One
- Height: 162 cm (5 ft 4 in)

Ayaka Nanase (七瀬 彩夏, Nanase Ayaka; born July 11, 1994) is a Japanese voice actress. She completed her professional training from Axl-Zero as a third term graduate and became a member of Axl-One since April 1, 2015.

== Filmography ==
=== Television animation ===
Year	Title	Role	Ref.
2015	My Love Story!!	Elementary School Student	
2016	Erased	Osamu	
2016	Whistle!	Miyuki Sakurai (voice remake)	
2017	Kamisama Minarai: Himitsu no Cocotama	Lychee	
2017	Sakura Quest	Yoshino Koharu	
2017	Two Car	Izumi Murata	
2018	Comic Girls	Miharu Nijino	
2018	Tsurune	Noa Shiragiku	
2018	Kira Kira Happy Hirake! Cocotama	Miku Mochizuki	
2019	Fruits Basket	Kazuma Sōma (young)	
2021	Super Cub	Reiko	
2021	Mother of the Goddess' Dormitory	Atena Saotome	
2021	Fena: Pirate Princess	Mary Read	
2022	In the Heart of Kunoichi Tsubaki	Itadori	
2023	Tsurune: The Linking Shot	Noa Shiragiku	
2023	Soaring Sky! Pretty Cure	Ageha Hijiri/Cure Butterfly	
2024	The Wrong Way to Use Healing Magic	Suzune	
2025	Your Forma	Darya	
2025	City the Animation	Matsuri Makabe	
2025	Scooped Up by an S-Rank Adventurer!	Lulu	
2025	Wandance	Kona Ōkouchi	
2026	Tamon's B-Side	Yamato Kinoshita	
2026	Roll Over and Die	Flum Apricot	
2026	Mistress Kanan Is Devilishly Easy	Nadeshiko Masurao	
2027	Reincarnation in the Game World Dan-Katsu	Hanna	

=== Original video animation ===
Year	Title	Role	Ref.
2017	Encouragement of Climb: Omoide Present	Mio	

=== Animated films ===
Year	Title	Role	Ref.
2018	Servamp -Alice in the Garden-	Yuri	
2019	Sound! Euphonium: The Movie – Our Promise: A Brand New Day	Mirei Suzuki	
2019	Blackfox	Rikka Isurugi	
2022	Tsurune: The Movie – The First Shot	Noa Shiragiku	

=== Video games ===
Year	Title	Role	Ref.
2017	Magia Record: Puella Magi Madoka Magica Side Story	Shizuku Hozumi	
2018	God Eater 3	Lulu Baran	
2019	Girls' Frontline	INSAS, 43M	
2019	Azur Lane	HMS Hardy, HMS Hunter, KMS U-37	
2023	Da Capo 5	Machi de Mikaketa Shoujo	
2023	Snowbreak: Containment Zone	Acacia	
2024	Granblue Fantasy	Raziel	
2027	Honkai: Nexus Anima	Protagonist (Female)	

=== Live-action films ===
Year	Title	Role	Ref.
2019	BLACKFOX: Age of the Ninja	Riri	

=== Dubbing ===
Title	Role	Dubbing Actor	Ref.
The Owl House	Willow Park	Tati Gabrielle	
