= Michiyo Murase =

Japanese actress and voice actress

- 村瀬 迪与
- Born: February 28; Gifu Prefecture, Japan
- Occupations: Actress, voice actress
- Agent: Mausu Promotion

Michiyo Murase (村瀬 迪与, Murase Michiyo; born February 28) is a Japanese actress and voice actress from Gifu Prefecture. She is affiliated with Mausu Promotion.

== Filmography ==
=== TV Anime ===
- Mainichi Kaasan (2009–2012), Daichi-kun, Satoko-chan
- Gaist Crusher (2013), Jinta Atō
- Yu-Gi-Oh! Zexal II (2014), Guard Penguin, Buzzbuzz Seven
- Senki Zesshō Symphogear GX (2015), Garie Tuman
- Kamisama Minarai: Himitsu no Cocotama (2015), Mogutan
- Flip Flappers (2016), Uexkull
- Schwarzesmarken (2016), Sylvia Kschessinska
- Space Patrol Luluco (2016), Sucy Manbavaran
- Little Witch Academia (2017), Sucy Manbavaran
- Megalobox (2018), Sachio
- Keep Your Hands Off Eizouken! (2020), Art Club Kubo
- Deca-Dence (2020), Jill
- BNA: Brand New Animal (2020), Mary Itami
- Megalobox 2: Nomad (2021), Sachio
- Red Cat Ramen (2024), Sabu
- Delicious in Dungeon (2024), Leed

=== Movies ===
- Little Witch Academia (2013), Sucy Manbavaran
- Little Witch Academia: The Enchanted Parade (2015), Sucy Manbavaran

=== Video games ===
- Little Witch Academia: Chamber of Time (2017), Sucy Manbavaran
- League of Legends (2018), neeko
- Pokémon Masters EX (2019), Mamane

=== Dubbing ===
- Everything I Know About Love, Birdy (Bel Powley)
