= Kamisama Minarai: Himitsu no Cocotama =

Japanese anime television series

- Cover of the first DVD boxset

かみさまみならい ヒミツのここたま (Kamisama minarai Himitsu no Kokotama)
- Genre: Adventure; Fantasy comedy; Slice of life
- Created by: Bandai
- Anime television series
- Directed by: Norio Nitta
- Written by: Michihiro Tsuchiya
- Music by: Ryosuke Nakanishi
- Studio: OLM, Inc.
- Original network: TXN (TV Tokyo, TV Osaka, TV Aichi)
- English network: HK: ViuTV
- Original run: October 1, 2015 – August 30, 2018
- Episodes: 139 + 8 specials
- Anime film

Eiga Kamisama Minarai: Himitsu no Cocotama: Kiseki o Okose ♪ Tepple to Doki Doki Cocotama Kai
- Directed by: Norio Nitta
- Written by: Michihiro Tsuchiya
- Music by: Ryosuke Nakanishi
- Studio: OLM, Inc.
- Released: April 28, 2017

Kamisama Minarai: Himitsu no Cocotama (かみさまみならい ヒミツのここたま, Kamisama Minarai: Himitsu no Kokotama; lit. 'Apprentice Gods: Secrets of Cocotama') is a Japanese anime television series animated by OLM, Inc., based on both the series of toys and the media franchise created by Bandai Namco Holdings. The series focuses on Kokoro Yotsuba, a fifth grader who accidentally witness a small god born from her treasured color pencil set, and must be bound through a contract in order to keep his existence a secret. The series was directed by Norio Nitta and written by Michihiro Tsuchiya (Mirmo!, PriPara, Cross Game) with character designs by Shinobu Ookawa. The series aired on all TXN stations in Japan from October 2015 to June 2018, replacing Tamagotchi! on its initial timeslot. The series uses a few elements from Shinto and Christian and Islam mythologies regarding the Cocotamas.

A sequel and spin-off series, titled Kira Kira Happy Hirake! Cocotama, was broadcast from September 2018 to September 2019.

== Story ==
Kokoro Yotsuba is a Grade 5 student who lives on the seaside town of Aozora, who is clumsy yet also takes good care of her belongings. Living alongside her brother, she once understood what her grandmother said to her, regarding that "everything has a soul" and that things should be cherished. One day, a strange egg was born from her colored pencil she cherished the most, revealing to as Luckytama, a Cocotama. However, he is found by Kokoro after returning from school and for him to exist, he asks Kokoro to sign a "Secret Contract" on which she cannot reveal the secret of the Cocotamas to the world and also must take care of him with great love and care. Now with Luckytama living with his new human friend, Kokoro must make sure she never reveal not tell their secret while meeting other Cocotamas who either befriend her or cause her trouble.

== Production ==
The series and toy line were both simultaneously unveiled at the 2015 Tokyo Toy Fair on June 18, 2015, and scheduled for an October release. The business partners for the series were also present at the unveiling, including Bandai President and CEO Kazunori Ueno, TXN's Anime Bureau member Yukio Kawasaki, OLM Representative Toshiaki Okuno, Lantis' Yoshie Terunari, Bandai's Hiroshi Kawata, and Narabe Ayumi of Kodansha. The series and toyline were planned to be a multimedia franchise aimed at girls, revealing their concept of "cherishing things you care for" relating to the title and theme. Kodansha confirmed in a press release that the series would be included as a serialized kid's manga in Tanoshī Yōchien, and that the toys would release in September 2015.

== Media ==
=== Anime ===
The anime based on the toyline, produced by OLM, aired on October 1, 2015, and ended on June 28, 2018, replacing Tamagotchi! Tama Tomo Daishū Go! on its initial timeslot. The opening song from episodes 1 to 76 is titled "Coro-Coro Cocotama!" (ころころここたま!, Korokoro kokotama!; lit. 'Roly-Poly Cocotama!') and from episode 77 to 126 is titled "Cocotama Happy Paradise!" (ここたまハッピ～パラダイス!, Kokotama Happi Paradaisu!), both performed by Erika. From episode 127 onwards, the title song is titled "Coro-Coro Cocotama! Naka-naka Nakayoshi Version" (ころころここたま!～なかなかなかよしバージョン～, Korokoro Kokotama! Naka-naka Nakayoshi Bājon; lit. 'Roly-Poly Cocotama! Naka-naka Friends Version') by Kaede Hondo and Megumi Han. The first ending theme is "Cocon-Poi-Poi Cocotama" (ここんぽいぽいここったま!, Kokon Poipoi Kokottama!) by Aki Toyosaki featuring Megumi Han, Yumi Kakazu, Ryoka Yuzuki, Rikako Aikawa and Michiyo Murase, the second ending theme is titled "Kokoro Daisuki Cocotama!" (こころだいすきここったま!, Kokoro daisuki kokotama!; lit. 'Heart-loving Cocotama!') by Kaede Hondo and Megumi Han, the third is titled "Utao Cocota-March!" (うたおう♪ここったまーち!, Utaou Kokottamachi!; lit. 'Let's Sing ♪ Cocota-March!') by Kaede Hondo featuring Megumi Han, Aki Toyosaki, Yumi Kakazu, Ryoka Yuzuki, Rikako Aikawa, Michiyo Murase, Ayumi Fujimura, Yuri Shiratori, Fumiko Orikasa and Ayaka Nanase while the fourth is titled "Ikou yo! Cocotama-kai!!" (いこうよ!ここたま界!!, Ikou yo! Kokotama-kai!!; lit. 'Let's go! Cocotama World!!') by Megumi Han, Aki Toyosaki and Saki Fujita.

TV Tokyo officially streams the anime in Japan as part of the AniTV Lineup on October 8, 2015.

=== Film ===
A theatrical film adaptation, titled Eiga Kamisama Minarai: Himitsu no Cocotama: Kiseki o Okose, Tepple to Doki-doki Cocotama-kai (映画かみさまみならい ヒミツのここたま 奇跡をおこせ♪テップルとドキドキここたま界, Eiga Kamisama Minarai Himitsu no Kokotama: Kiseki o Okose, Teppuru to Doki-doki Kokotama-kai; lit. 'Apprentice Gods: Cocotama's Secret the Movie (Make a Miracle, Tepple and the Exciting Cocotama World') was released on April 28, 2017 during Japan's Golden Week. It was released alongside a Tamagotchi! short film for the Tamagotchi franchise's 20th anniversary. The film's opening theme is "Coro Coro Cocotama! 2017" (ころころここたま! 2017, Korokoro kokotama! 2017; "Rolling Cocotama! 2017") by Erika with Megumi Han, Aki Toyosaki, Yumi Kakazu, Ryoka Yuzuki, Rikako Aikawa and Michiyo Murase while the ending theme is "Taisetsuna Mono" (たいせつなもの; lit. 'Things We Cherish the Most') by Kaede Hondo. The film's official soundtrack was released by Lantis on April 28, 2017.

== Reception ==
The toy franchise topped sales numbers in Japan, with more than 1 million in total sales by December 2015. It would top its previous record, with the total amount of the toys sold being 1.4 million. By May 2018, the Cocotama Dolls had shipped more than 5 million pieces while the Cocotama House had shipped more than 1 million pieces.

The movie debuted in 10th place at the Japanese Box Office during Golden Week across 151 theaters in Japan. In its South Korean theatrical release, it was viewed by more than 13.6 million people in 3 weeks.
