= Ryoka Yuzuki =

Japanese actress and voice actress (born 1974)

- 柚木 涼香
- Born: January 10, 1974 (age 52); Anjō, Aichi, Japan
- Other names: Ryōka Yuzuki; Ayumi Nagashii; Kanori Kadomatsu; Airi
- Occupations: Actress; voice actress
- Years active: 1990–present
- Agent: 81 Produce
- Notable work: Air as Minagi Tohno; Naruto as Ino Yamanaka; A Certain Magical Index as Oriana Thomson; My Teen Romantic Comedy SNAFU as Shizuka Hiratsuka; Kill la Kill as Satsuki Kiryūin; Granblue Fantasy as Metera

Ryoka Yuzuki (柚木 涼香, Yuzuki Ryōka; born January 10, 1974) is a Japanese actress and voice actress. She has played voice roles in a number of Japanese anime including Satsuki Kiryūin in Kill la Kill, Ino Yamanaka in Naruto and Boruto: Naruto Next Generations, Shamal in Magical Girl Lyrical Nanoha A's, Temari in Shugo Chara!, Risa Momioka in To Love-Ru, Akio Fudou in Trinity Seven, Minagi Tohno in Air, Shizuka Hiratsuka in My Teen Romantic Comedy SNAFU, Tomoe Mikagura in Tailenders, and Uruoi-chan in Pururun! Shizuku-chan.

More recently, she has played the roles of Sayu's mother in Higehiro, Hilda Boreas Greyrat in Mushoku Tensei, Courage in Food Wars!: Shokugeki no Soma, and Metera in Granblue Fantasy.

== Filmography ==
=== Television animation ===
Year	Title	Role	Other notes	Source
1995	Armitage III: Poly-Matrix	Naomi Armitage		
1995	Cool Operations 01: Curious Fruit	Ai Yuuki		
1998	Cardcaptor Sakura	Ruby Moon, Nakuru Akizuki		
1999	Initial D	Kazumi Akiyama		
1999	Angel Links	Meifon Li		
1999	Dual! Parallel Trouble Adventure	Alice Sharome		
1999	Hoshin Engi	Oh Kijin		
2000	Brigadoon	Midori Mano, the Momoi sisters, Chiasa Kurihara, Kushatohn		
2000	Gensomaden Saiyuki	Rin Rei (eps 35, 49)		
2000	Inuyasha	Princess Tsuyu (ep 8)		
2001	Mazinkaiser	Gamia Q		
2001	Figure 17	Asuka Karasawa		
2001	PaRappa the Rapper	Ghost		
2001	Real Bout High School	Reiha		
2001	Sister Princess	Marie		
2002	Mirmo!	Mimomo		
2002	Naruto	Ino Yamanaka		
2002	Chobits	Takako Shimizu		
2003	Beast Fighter - The Apocalypse	Hannah		
2004	My-HiME	Haruka Suzushiro		
2004	One Piece: The Cursed Holy Sword	Maya		
2004	Koi Kaze	Shouko Akimoto		
2004	Daphne in the Brilliant Blue	Claire Mitsunaga		
2005	My-Otome	Haruka Suzushiro		
2005	Air	Minagi Tohno		
2005	Hell Girl	Masami Sekimoto		
2005	Onegai My Melody	Mr. Bee (ep 22)		
2005	Magical Girl Lyrical Nanoha A's	Shamal		
2006	Legend of the Glass Fleet	Rachel		
2006	Kirarin Revolution	Izumi Amakawa		
2006	Buso Renkin	Tokiko Tsumura		
2007	Magical Girl Lyrical Nanoha Strikers	Shamal		
2007	Naruto: Shippuden	Ino Yamanaka		
2007	Night Wizard The Animation	Lion Gunta		
2007	Shugo Chara!	Nana, Temari, Saeko Honna (ep 49)		
2008	Akiba-chan	Lillian-chan		
2008	Candy Boy	Yukino Sakurai		
2008	To Love Ru	Risa Momioka		
2009	A Certain Scientific Railgun	Aomi Yanagisako		
2009	Queen's Blade	Cattleya		
2010	Nurarihyon no Mago	Awashima		
2010	Motto To Love Ru	Celine; Risa Momioka		
2010	A Certain Magical Index II	Oriana Thomson		
2011	Mobile Suit Gundam AGE	Girard Spriggan		
2011	Carnival Phantasm	Arcueid Brunestud, Neco Arc, Phantas-Moon		
2012	Rock Lee & His Ninja Pals	Ino Yamanaka		
2013	My Teen Romantic Comedy SNAFU	Shizuka Hiratsuka		
2013	Kill la Kill	Satsuki Kiryuuin		
2013	Death Parade	Castra		
2013	Haiyore! Nyaruko-san W	Kuune		
2014	Trinity Seven	Akio Fudou		
2014	Kaitou Joker	Jack's Mother		
2015	My Teen Romantic Comedy SNAFU Too!	Shizuka Hiratsuka		
2015	Magical Girl Lyrical Nanoha Vivid	Shamal		
2015	Hacka Doll the Animation	Hacka Doll #0, idol (episode 2)		
2016	Norn9	Nagisa Totonose		
2017	Boruto: Naruto Next Generations	Ino Yamanaka		
2018	A Certain Magical Index III	Oriana Thomson		
2019	Food Wars! Shokugeki no Souma: The Fourth Plate	Courage		
2019	Do You Love Your Mom and Her Two-Hit Multi-Target Attacks?	Kazuno / Empress of the Night		
2020	My Teen Romantic Comedy SNAFU Climax	Shizuka Hiratsuka		
2020	Re:Zero − Starting Life in Another World 2nd Season	Naoko Natsuki		
2020	Super HxEros	Kiseichuu		
2020	The Day I Became a God	Tokiko Narukami		
2021	Mushoku Tensei	Hilda Boreas Greyrat		
2021	Kaginado	Minagi Tohno		
2023	Synduality: Noir	Claudia		
2024	The Many Sides of Voice Actor Radio	Yumiko's Mother		
2025	Toilet-Bound Hanako-kun Season 2	Sumire		
2026	My Girlfriend's Friend	Kaori's mother		

=== Theatrical animation ===
Year	Title	Role	Other notes	Source
2007	Tamagotchi: The Movie	Memetchi		
2008	Tamagotchi: Happiest Story in the Universe!	Memetchi		
2009	Naruto Shippūden 3: Inheritors of the Will of Fire	Ino Yamanaka		
2012	Road to Ninja: Naruto the Movie	Ino Yamanaka		
2012	Code Geass: Akito the Exiled	Akito (young)		
2014	The Last: Naruto the Movie	Ino Yamanaka		
2017	Trinity Seven the Movie: The Eternal Library and the Alchemist Girl	Akio Fudou		
2019	Trinity Seven: Heavens Library & Crimson Lord	Akio Fudou		
2019	Promare	Biar Colossus		

=== Drama CDs ===
Year	Title	Role	Other notes	Source
2002	DRAMA CD Chobits chapter.1 to chapter.5	Takako Shimizu		
2007	Idolm@ster Xenoglossia CD Drama Vol.2 Shuukan Mondenkind	Hotaru Yasuhara		
2007	Night Wizard The Animation Characters Vol.5 Lion Gunta	Lion Gunta		
2011	THE IDOLM@STER Splash Red for Dearly Stars	Mai Hidaka		
2020	CARDCAPTOR SAKURA CLEAR CARD ARC KAKIOROSHI	Nakuru Akizuki		
2020	THE DAY I BECAME A RAPPER -1st BATTLE-	Tokiko Narukami		

=== Video games ===
Year	Title	Role	Other notes	Source
1996	Kizuato	Chizuru Kashiwagi		
2000	The Bouncer	Dominique Cross		
2001	AIR	Minagi Tono		
2001	Sister Princess	Marie		
2001	You're Under Arrest	Chiharu Arisugawa		
2001	Inuyasha	Tsuyu		
2002	Melty Blood	Arcueid Brunestud, Red Arcueid, Neco Arc, and Archetype:Earth		
2002	Tales of Destiny 2	Riala		
2003	Arc the Lad: Twilight of the Spirits	Lilia		
2004	Naruto (series)	Ino Yamanaka		
2005	Tales of the World: Narikiri Dungeon 3	Riala		
2005	Demon Chaos	Aoi Yasaka		
2006	Utawarerumono	Eruru		
2007	Buso Renkin - Welcome to Papillon Park	Tokiko Tsumura		
2008	Trauma Center: New Blood	Elena Salazar		
2008	Luminous Arc 2	Dear		
2008	Fate/tiger colosseum	Neko Arc, Phantas-Moon		
2008	Ikki Tousen (Battle Vixens)	Kanpei (Guan Ping)		
2009	Tales of the World: Radiant Mythology 2	Riala		
2009	Queen's Blade: Spiral Chaos	Cattleya		
2009	Tales of Graces	Victoria, Riara		
2010	Solatorobo: Red the Hunter	Opéra Kranz		
2010	Hello, Good-bye	May Yukishiro		
2011	Aquapazza: Aquaplus Dream Match	Eruru, Chizuru Kashiwagi		
2011	Queen's Gate: Spiral Chaos	Catrea		
2011	Kaitou Tenshi Twin Angel: Toki to Sekai no Meikyuu	Nine Violet		
2013	Tamagotchi! Seishun no Dream School	Memetchi		
2013	My Youth Romantic Comedy even in Game is Wrong As I Expected	Shizuka Hiratsuka		
2014	Granblue Fantasy	Metera		
2014	Super Heroine Chronicle	Nine Violet		
2015	Grand Kingdom	Gradius Ringland		
2017	Another Eden	Radica		
2017	Shin Megami Tensei: Strange Journey Redux	Shekina		
2018	Kirby Star Allies	Zan Partizanne		
2019	Trinity Seven: Phantasm Library & Seventh Sol	Fudo Akio		
2019	Kill la Kill the Game: IF	Satsuki Kiryuin		
2020	Dragon Quest X	Lantel		
2020	Guardian Tales	Captain Eva, Idol Captain Eva		
2022	Counter:Side	Harab		
2022	Arknights	Touch		
2022	Cookie Run Kingdom	Financier Cookie		
2022	Azur Lane	SN Chkalov		
2022	Genshin Impact	Candace		
2023	Path to Nowhere	Uni		

=== Live action roles ===
- All Night Long – Girl at Railroad Crossing
- All Night Long 2 – Sayaka Mizukami
- All Night Long 3 – Hitomi Nomura
- Angel of Darkness 3 – Fumie Saotome
- Banana Hakusho 2 – Kaoru
- Black Jack 2: Pinoko Aishiteru – Yurie Saionji, The Masked Woman
- Eko Eko Azarak: Wizard of Darkness – Kazumi Tanaka
- The Gigolo Dochinpira – Yuna Katsuki
- Gold Rush – Ayumi Nagashii
- Happy End Story – Yūko Itō
- Hana no Ran – Attendant
- Kasaeifu wa Mita 14 – Kanae Aoyagi
- Labyrinth: The Invisible Man – Keiko Mukai
- Ladies in Torture I – Chika
- Otona no Ehon – Kadori Kadomatsu
- Sakura no Sono – Shiomi Kanagawa
- Teito Monogatari Gaiden
- Tokyo Babylon 1999 – Rie
- Yabō Dake ga Ai o Korosu: Game no Kisoku – Satomi Tachibana
- Voyeurs, Inc. – Sanae Ishihara

=== Dubbing ===
==== Movie ====
- The Exorcist: Director's Cut – Regan MacNeil (Linda Blair)
- Legally Blondes – Tiffany Donohugh (Brittany Curran)
- Thirteen – Tracy Louise Freeland (Evan Rachel Wood)
- Transformers: Rise of the Beasts – Nightbird (Michaela Jaé Rodriguez)

==== Animation ====
- Transformers series (1997–2013)
  - Beast Wars: Transformers (1997–1998, Blackwidow, NAVI-ko, Una) * Debut work under the name of Ayumi Nagashii
  - Transformers: Animated (2010, Blackarachnia, Narration in Otoboto family segments)
  - Transformers: Prime (2012–2013, Airachnid, Ida)
  - Transformers One (2024, Airachnid)
- Barbie (film series) (2001–2018)
  - Barbie in the Nutcracker (2001, Clara)
  - Barbie as Rapunzel (2002, Rapunzel)
  - Barbie of Swan Lake (2003, Odette)
  - Barbie as the Princess and the Pauper (2004, Princess Annalize / Erica)
  - Barbie Dolphin Magic (2018, Barbie)
- The Mystical Laws (2012)
- My Little Pony: Friendship Is Magic (2015–2017, Trixie)
  - My Little Pony: Equestria Girls (film) (2015)
  - My Little Pony Girls: Rainbow Adventure (2015)
  - My Little Pony: Equestria Girls – Legend of Everfree (2017)
