= Kira Kira Happy Hirake! Cocotama =

Anime television series

- Official Poster of Kira Kira Happy ★ Hirake! Cocotama

キラキラハッピー★ひらけ！ここたま (Kirakira Happī ★ Hirake! Kokotama)
- Genre: Fantasy comedy, Pet
- Created by: Bandai
- Anime television series
- Directed by: Norio Nitta
- Written by: Michihiro Tsuchiya
- Music by: Ken Itō; Kenichi Kuroda
- Studio: OLM, Inc.
- Original network: TXN (TV Tokyo, TV Osaka)
- English network: HK: ViuTV
- Original run: September 6, 2018 – September 26, 2019
- Episodes: 55
- Original net animation

Mono no Kamisama Cocotama
- Directed by: Norio Nitta
- Written by: Michihiro Tsuchiya
- Music by: Ken Itō; Kenichi Kuroda
- Studio: OLM, Inc.
- Released: September 26, 2019 – February 21, 2020
- Episodes: 12

Kira Kira Happy ★ Hirake! Cocotama is a Japanese anime television series animated by OLM, Inc. that serves as a sequel and spinoff to Kamisama Minarai: Himitsu no Cocotama, based on both the Cocotama series of toys and the Cocotama media franchise created by Bandai Namco Holdings. The series was directed by Norio Nitta and written by Michihiro Tsuchiya (Mirmo De Pon!, PriPara, Cross Game) with character designs by Shinobu Ookawa. The series aired on all TXN stations in Japan from September 6, 2018, to September 26, 2019, replacing Himitsu no Cocotama in its initial timeslot.

An original net animation spinoff, titled Mono no Kamisama Cocotama, aired on YouTube starting on September 26, 2019.

== Story ==
A long time ago, Haruka Hoshinogawa made a wish with the town's old cherry blossom tree with her grandfather while receiving a present from him: a cherry blossom ribbon. As she grew up, she treasured the gift given to her while starting fifth grade in her school. One day, upon noting that the old cherry blossom tree is wilting, her grandfather left the shop to explore the world and let Haruka take care of the store in his absence. The next day while sleeping, her treasured ribbon sprouted a strange egg, revealing a Cocotama, a god born from an object cherished with love and care. Haruka woke up and accidentally saw the Cocotama on the table, retreated to her Hiding Egg. As Haruka picked it up, it changed into a mysterious key. Left with some questions, the Cocotama introduced herself as Ribbon, and Haruka learned about the existence of her kind and the mysteries behind the strange key she had. Ribbon realized that the key is the Key of Wonders and that Haruka was chosen by it to be the Legendary Contractor to the Cocotamas. Now, both of them try to run the shop and meet new Cocotama friends while discovering the mysteries and powers behind the Key of Wonders.

== Production ==
The sequel/spin-off series was first teased on June 6, 2018, before the 2018 Tokyo Toy Fair. The series was fully revealed on the franchise's official Twitter page and live stream on June 7, 2018, which revealed the basic premise, characters, and the new set of toys that would be released in Fall of 2018. Part of the attendants of the livestream were the voice actors of the new characters: Minami Takahashi, Inori Minase and, Mariya Ise. They confirmed on stage that they would voice the new characters in the show, with Ise saying that she loved her role in the first series after 3 years and that she would do her best in the sequel/spin-off. Later on, on August 24, Manga artist Yuka Fujiwara was confirmed to be the character concept designer for the series.

== Media ==
=== Merchandise ===
The Hirake! Cocotama House Series (ひらけ！ここたまハウスシリーズ, Hirake! Kokotama hausu shirīzu), released in September 2018. It retains the same concept as the previous dollhouse set but with a new interactivity feature. Unlike the first series, the Cocotama Figures each has a special pin on the bottom, which, connected to a compatible set, will activate special lights and sounds depending on each figure. Aside from the figures, certain parts of the new dollhouse set can also be activated and opened using a key which is included with the first figure of the series or the deluxe edition of the Cocotama Music Box Castle Dollhouse set.

=== Anime ===
The anime based on the toy line, produced by OLM, aired From September 6, 2018, to September 26, 2019. Norio Nitta and Michihiro Tsuchiya return as both director and writer for the series, with character design drafts from Yuka Fujiwara and character designs from Shinobu Ookawa and Shouji Yasukazu. The series's opening theme is titled "Himitsu no Kagi, Cocotama!" (ヒミツのカギ、ここたま！, Himitsu no kagi, kokotama!; "The Secret Key, Cocotama!") by Minami Takahashi, Inori Minase, Mariya Ise and Emiri Iwai while the first ending song is titled "Cocotama Sagaso-tsu! Mi~tsukketta♪" (ここたまさがそっ！み～つっけた♪, Kokotama sagaso~tsu! Mi~tsukketa ♪; "Look for Cocotamas! I~found You♪") by Kaoru Masaki on episode 1 to 29. The music for the sequel/spin-off is composed by Ken Itō (Handa-Kun) and Kenichi Kuroda. Later, replaced by second ending song is titled "Cocotama Town De Nikkoniko★" (ここたまタウンでにっこにこ★, Kokotama Taun De Nikkoniko★) by Kaoru Masaki and Erika starting episode 30 onwards.

TV Tokyo officially began streaming the series in Japan as part of the Ani.TV Lineup on September 6, 2018. Bandai Channel also started streaming the series in Japan on video site Nico Nico Douga and NTT DoCoMo's video streaming service Docomo Anime Store.

=== Original net animation ===
An original net animation series titled Mono no Kamisama Cocotama (Note: Mono no Kamisama Kokotama (Japanese: モノのかみさま ここたま; "Cocotama, Our Little Gods")) started airing on YouTube on September 26, 2019, uniting the main Cocotama of both the original series and the sequel/spin-off. Unlike the TV series however, this web series does not feature main human characters Kokoro Yotsuba and Haruka Hoshinogawa.
