= Ninjala =

- Developer: GungHo Online Entertainment
- Publisher: GungHo Online Entertainment
- Director: Motoki Kaneda
- Designer: Yoshiumi Hataya
- Programmer: Kazuya Honda
- Writers: Asuka Konno; Kyoko Kitahara
- Engine: Unreal Engine 4
- Platform: Nintendo Switch
- Release: June 24, 2020
- Genre: Action
- Mode: Multiplayer

Ninjala is a free-to-play multiplayer action video game developed and published by GungHo Online Entertainment with some involvement from Soleil. Unveiled at E3 2018, it was released on June 24, 2020 for the Nintendo Switch.

The game received mixed reviews, with many praising the multiplayer, gameplay and art style, but criticizing the story mode. The game was widely compared to Splatoon due to its style and gameplay.

A sequel, Ninjala 2: The Uncharted Planet, is scheduled to be released for the Nintendo Switch 2 in Spring 2027.

== Gameplay ==
Ninjala centers upon an eponymous tournament being held by the fictional World Ninja Association (WNA), which developed bubblegum that could be used to allow people with the DNA of a ninja to perform ninjutsu. The game focuses primarily on melee combat using various types of weapons. The player can double-jump and run along walls to navigate the map. A match can be played between up to eight players in either teams or a solo "Battle Royale".

Bubbles can be blown to trigger abilities, such as launching them at opponents as a ranged attack, or activating an air dash move. Their power can be increased by destroying drones that periodically spawn on the map, allowing the player to craft a larger melee weapon when fully-charged. The player can also disguise themselves as a prop on the field. Points are scored primarily by knocking out opponents, and an "Ippon" bonus can be scored as part of a KO if the player does so in combination with their abilities. Each match lasts four minutes and the player or team that scores the most points when the timer runs out wins.

== Characters ==
=== Main characters ===
There are eight main characters in Ninjala. In the game, they all have common stats and abilities. Each of them has a unique backstory that was explored in the game's supplementary media, such as TV anime.

- Van Voiced by: Yumiko Kobayashi (Japanese); Becky Robinson (English): A young boy with a talent for basketball, Van has been wishing for his father's return from his overseas trips. However, he ended up caught between the battle between his father, who he discovered to be a ninja, and Hebimaru who managed to defeat him by trapping him inside a burning shed with Van in it. As the result, Van's father was put into an indefinite coma, but not before he make his son chew a Ninja Gum that awakened his ninjutsu genes and save them both from the burning shed. He was asked by his mother to train for Ninjala under the tutelage of Genryusai, while at the same time working as a night-time vigilante tasked with stopping the plans of the Space Ninjas, gum-like aliens seeking to conquer planets by absorbing the DNA of ninjas to grow stronger.
- Berecca Voiced by: Akari Kitō (Japanese); Kailey Snider (English): One of the lead scientists in charge of perfecting Ninja Gums, which is said to have the power to awaken the dormant shinobi genes in humans, Berecca was a no-nonsense woman, who is just continuing the research her father, Sean left behind. Having witnessed the accidental creation of the perfected Ninja Gums, she tried one herself and is shocked to learned of her shinobi heritage, just before Ron, acting as one of the scientists in charge of the project, betrays them then escaped, she and Burton learned of the Gum's side effect: chewing on a Ninja Gum can turn adults into children. Thus, Berecca, alongside Burton, decides to join Ninjala in hopes of finding a cure to the Gum's side effects and revert to normal.
- Burton Voiced by: Takahiro Sakurai (Japanese); Max Mittelman (English): One of the lead scientists in charge of perfecting Ninja Gums and a childhood friend of Berecca, Burton was an Albert Einstein enthusiast, often using his philosophies and scientific mindset in creating inventions that can change the world for the better, not to mention having ninjutsu heritage in his blood, thus explaining his involvement in perfecting Ninja Gums. After accidentally creating a perfected batch of Ninja Gum, he was attacked by Ron, who was sent to eliminate him and Berecca, and handing over his findings to Allen. Burton tried to defeat Ron, but failed and got blasted with Berecca, before he and Berecca discovered that the Gum de-aged them into children, prompting the two to join Ninjala in order to reverse the side-effects and further refine the Ninja Gum.
- Ron Voiced by: Hiroki Yasumoto (Japanese); Regi Davis (English): An enigmatic ninja with an agenda, Ron is just one of the names he took in order to accomplish his tasks. When his plans to steal data of Ninja Gum succeed, he was chased by Allen's minions, forcing him to take up one of the Ninja Gum pieces left behind in Burton's wrecked laboratory to go undercover by partaking in Ninjala as a young ninja in hopes of finding the two scientists and complete his mission.
- Lucy Voiced by: Aoi Yūki (Japanese); Reba Buhr (English): A slightly deranged girl who wears an eyepatch to hide her mysterious powers. Once a sweet kid, Lucy was just a normal kid until a traumatic event awakened her dormant shinobi gene within her, causing anything she sets her eyes on to turn into nightmarish tentacles. This alone has cause Lucy to distance herself from everyone and have to wear an eyepatch over her left eye to prevent this power from leaking out. It wasn't until an invitation from the WNA and some encouragement from her mother does she embrace this power and adopts a "crazy girl" persona as she trains herself for Ninjala.
- Kappei Voiced by: Ayumu Murase (Japanese); Kath Soucie (English): A young shinobi from Ega, a small ninja-inspired town in Oedo, Japan, Kappei has since been training to be a full-fledged ninja like in the stage plays he saw. Having accidentally discovered Gumchi, a playful gum-like alien, he and Gumchi has formed a brotherly bond, prompting his grandfather, Gen'unsai, to send Kappei to Komerica to train under Genryusai's tutelage, as well as protecting Gumchi from anyone trying to abuse its powers.
- Jane Voiced by: Junko Minagawa (Japanese); Ashly Burch (English): A hacker working for the World Ninja Organization's Intelligence Department, Jane was a serious woman who would hack onto anything within ease, often having a preference for munching on candies while working. She was tried to hack data of Ninja Gum, but it failed, so she was going by her own. But then, Allen's minions appeared to attack Jane. Just than, Ron appeared and then defeated them. However, the building where they hid had a time bomb, so Ron made Jane chew a piece of Ninja Gum. Now stuck as a small child, she decided to infiltrate Ninjala, alongside Ron, in order to find the reason behind the project's true purpose and to figure out how to revert to normal.
- Emma Voiced by: Megumi Han (Japanese); Kimberly Brooks (English): A lively street-performer who masquerades as a vigilante at night. Emma used to be shunned because of her newly awakened ninjutsu genetics, until she learned how to properly use it for the sake of good, such as taking out conniving criminals in the dead of night. Seeing potential in Emma, she was scouted by the World Ninja Organization to participate in Ninjala to help Emma hone her skills, as both a ninja and a performer.

=== Side characters ===
- Gumchi Voiced by: Honoka Inoue (Japanese); Stephanie Southerland (English): The mascot of Ninjala. He is a small alien who arrived on Earth centuries ago, and was found by Kappei in the present day, and they have been best friends since. Gumchi spends most of his time at the Academy. He can shapeshift into weapons similar to that of the Ninja Gum.
- Goro: Burton's cat.
- Kurokos: Robots who work for the Academy.
- Genryusai (Voiced by: Chō (Japanese); Erik Braa (English)): Mentor of Burton and his friends.
- Gen'unsai (Voiced by: Chō (Japanese); Erik Braa (English)): Kappei's grandfather and Genryusai's twin brother.
- Allen (voiced by: Kosei Hirota): The initial main antagonist of Ninjala, who is the director of WNA. He spends several episodes sending the Oniwabanshu, the WNA's elite force, in an attempt to assassinate Burton, Berecca, Ron, and Jane, after they learn of the secret of the Ninja Gum and his plans to gain power. He stops hunting them after they achieve numerous victories against the Space Ninja and is ultimately defeated and arrested in Episode 53.
- Luke (voiced by: Ikuya Sawaki): A mysterious old man who is the chief of WNA. After he steps down from his role, it is revealed he is Master Shadow, the leader of the Shadow Ninjas, thus serving as the overarching main antagonist of the series. His true endgame is to create a world of peace ruled by ninjas.
- Bruce (voiced by: Kenji Nomura): A teacher of WNA academy. He likes to crack jokes but dislikes pumpkins due to a childhood trauma.
- Amy (voiced by: Yūko Kaida): A teacher of WNA academy. Her family has grown pumpkins.
- Daisy (voiced by: Mayumi Yamaguchi): A teacher of WNA academy. She has lots of knowledge of ninja.
- Leonard (Voiced by: Masafumi Kimura (Japanese); Chris Koprowski (English)): Sean's companion. He is being chased by the Shadow Ninjas and the Oniwabanshu in the anime.
- Sean (voiced by: Masami Kikuchi): Berreca's father. After being attacked by the Shadow Ninjas, his status is currently unknown, though the anime reveals he sacrificed himself to save Leonard from the Shadow Ninjas.
- Dan (voiced by: Rikako Aikawa): The hot-blooded, strict and bossy leader of the Bottle Collectors.
- Tyler (voiced by: Makoto Furukawa): One of the members of Bottle Collectors. He has been Dan's partner since Ninja Camp.
- Keith (voiced by: Kōhei Amasaki): One of the members of Bottle Collectors. He likes beautiful things.
- Naomi (voiced by: Yō Taichi): One of the members of Bottle Collectors. She is from Oedo.
- May (voiced by: Aki Kanada): One of the members of Bottle Collectors. She is the Ninjala Champion.
- Ezet (voiced by: Junya Enoki): A mysterious boy who is new student of the Academy. He initially seems paranoid and distrustful of everyone around him, especially Gumchi since his appearance resembles that of a Space Ninja (or "N325" as his people call them) but eventually warms up to the other students. He is originally from Meluz, another planet that was overtaken by the Space Ninjas, but he manages to defeat them with the help of Burton and friends. He has strong physical abilities, but he can't use Ninja Gum, though he instead teams up with Gumchi and uses him as a weapon.
- Bucket and Mallet (voiced by: Toru Nara and Nobuyori Sagara, respectively): A pair of Meluzian pilots who brought Ezet to Earth in search of weapons to fight back against the Space Ninjas. After the Space Ninjas are banished from Meluz, Bucket and Mallet spend most of their time on Earth running a burger joint.
- Mistress Shade (voiced by: Mai Nakahara): Luke's apprentice who assumes control of the Shadow Ninjas in his absence. It turns out her real name is Grace and that she was trained by Luke after both her parents were killed.
- Gumdiva (voiced by: Taiten Kusunoki): The leader of the Space Ninjas. Unlike most other Space Ninjas, she can speak fluent English.
- Gumonk (voiced by: Kenta Miyake): The leader of the Yokai, who are the great ancestors of the Space Ninjas. Like the Gumdiva, Gumonk can speak fluent English.
- Flora (voiced by: Mai Nakahara): A new teacher at the WNA Academy, who is actually the long-lost twin sister of Mistress Shade. After she reunites with her sister, Grace changes her ways and turns herself in. Flora goes on a temporary leave afterwards.

=== Minor characters ===
- Warren Voiced by: Aya Endo (Japanese); Kari Wahlgren (English): An agent of WNA who scouted Emma.
- Tsukikage (voiced by: Daisuke Kishio): Allen's minion who is a master of disguise.
- Harold Cook (voiced by: Satoshi Taki): The president of Komerika. He secretly worked with Allen until he was kidnapped by him and the Shadow Ninjas and was rescued by Burton and friends. He was later brainwashed by Luke to launch missiles at Eagle City in an attempt to ruin his reputation but was again saved by the WNA students.
- Space Ninjas (voiced by: Yusuke Numata, Akeno Watanabe, Megumi Han, Hana Sato, Masaaki Ihara): Mysterious creatures that are looking for Ninja Gum.
- Shadow Ninjas (voiced by: Mizuki Nakamura): Ninjas who are against WNA.
- Hebimaru (voiced by: Setsuji Sato): One of the Shadow Ninjas. He has attacked Max and is now seeking to attack Burton and his friends.
- Bob Voiced by: Takahiro Mizushima (Japanese); Todd Haberkorn (English): An unlucky character who doesn't appear in the TV anime.
- Max Voiced by: Taiten Kusunoki (Japanese); Andrew Morgado (English): Van's father. He has been attacked by Hebimaru, but has survived.
- Billy (voiced by: Aki Kanada): Just an extra who has challenged Burton, but he was quickly defeated.
- Sisler (voiced by: Takumu Miyazono): A muscular man who has been defeated by Keith. After that, he has been awakened to beautiful battle.
- Hongfa (voiced by: Yuko Kaida): A girl who has crush on Burton.
- Terry (voice actor unknown): An extra who was defeated by Hongfa.
- Leona (voiced by: Sayaka Senbongi): A ghost that wanders around WNA academy at night. She appeared only one time.
- Dia (voiced by: Mai Kanazawa): Teammate of Kappei and Tyler.
- Cluv (voiced by: Erisa Kuon): Teammate of Dan and Emma.
- Chloe Voiced by: Emiri Kato (Japanese); Julie Nathanson (English): Lucy's friend. Although she knows that Lucy has special powers, she is not afraid of it or her.
- Sarah (voiced by: Lisa Watanabe): Emma's fan. She has a friend whose name is Mary, but Mary is never seen in the series.
- Peggy (voiced by: Sanae Miyuki): The owner of Burton's apartment. She only appeared in the first few episodes.
- John (voice actor unknown): Van's friend. He only appeared in the first few episodes.
- Satsuki, Sally (voiced by: Nana Hamasaki, Hana Sato): Lucy's friends. After knowing that Lucy has special powers, they are afraid of it. They appeared only one time.
- Tatsuya (voiced by: Yuhko Kaida): A boy who lives in Oedo.
- Tim, Jason (voice actors unknown): Companions of Dan and Tyler in Ninja Camp. They appeared only one time.
- Jimmy (voiced by: Kiyono Yasuno): A boy who has trained kendo with Kappei. He appeared only one time.
- Devil Ant (voiced by: VOLCANO OTA): A former pro wrestler who has kidnapped Burton and his friends. After he was defeated by Bruce, he was arrested. He appeared only one time.
- Doma (voiced by: Eijo Tsuda): An engineer who made mechanical suit Ninjacket to defeat Genryusai, who has defeated him many times since they were in training.

== Development ==
GungHo CEO Kazuki Morishita explained that Ninjala was inspired by his childhood memories of ninja and sports chanbara, having envisioned Ninjala as being a mixture of both. He stated that the main goal was to develop create a multiplayer action game that both children and adults could enjoy. Takeshi Arakawa, who co-produced Dissidia Final Fantasy while at Square Enix, is part of the development staff of Ninjala. For its unveiling, GungHo elected to primarily target Europe and North America to gauge their reactions before giving it more prominent promotion in Japan. Ninjala was built using the Unreal Engine game engine.

Originally announced for release in 2019, GungHo announced on May 31, 2019 that Ninjala had been delayed to early 2020. In December 2019, GungHo president Kazuki Morishita stated that Ninjala was still on track for a Spring 2020 release, and that it would contain content that would be "satisfying" for "seasoned players". Ninjala was originally set to be released on May 27, 2020, but it was delayed four weeks later to June 24 due to the COVID-19 pandemic.

== Promotion ==
A teaser trailer for Ninjala was released on June 13, 2018, which is set to music by the kawaii metal band Babymetal. Footage from the game was also briefly featured during Nintendo's E3 2018 video presentation the same day. A new trailer was released on December 6, 2018, showcasing the backstory of Ninjala's universe.

During the Nintendo Direct Mini on March 26, a new trailer was showcased, along with an announcement that Ninjala would be released on May 27, 2020 as a free-to-play title. A CGI animated "episode 0" by Marza, introducing the characters and the lore of the game, was released on March 31, 2020. A series of time-limited multiplayer beta sessions were held on April 28 and 29, which were affected by various server issues.

On August 24, 2020, a collaboration with video game franchise Sonic the Hedgehog was announced for season 2.

On April 9, 2020, a collaboration with smartphone game Puzzle & Dragons was announced.

On June 19, 2021, there has been an announcement on the official PlayNinjala YouTube Channel that there will be a collaboration with the popular manga and anime series Demon Slayer: Kimetsu no Yaiba.

On March 10, 2022, a collaboration with the popular manga and anime series Jujutsu Kaisen began.

On March 15, 2023, a collaboration with the popular manga and anime series Attack on Titan began.

On July 5, 2023, a collaboration with the popular anime series Neon Genesis Evangelion began.

== Media ==
=== Anime ===
- Ninjala
- Created by: Kazuki Morishita
- Anime television series
- Directed by: Mamoru Kanbe (1–63); Nanako Shimazaki (64–)
- Written by: Kenji Konuta (27–)
- Music by: Takahiro Obata
- Studio: OLM Team Inoue (1–112); OLM Team Hikita (113–)
- Licensed by: Sentai Filmworks
- Original network: TXN (TV Tokyo)
- Original run: January 8, 2022 – present
- Episodes: 243

In 2021, it was announced that the game would be adapted into a Japanese anime television series, which premiered on TV Tokyo on January 8, 2022 and is produced by OLM. The series was directed by Mamoru Kanbe up until episode 63, with Nanako Shimazaki taking over the role starting from episode 64. Kenji Konuta handled series composition starting from episode 27. Atsushi Suzuki designed the characters, and Takahiro Obata composed the music. Up until episode 40, the opening theme song “Maybe Baby” was performed by Kyary Pamyu Pamyu. From episode 41 to episode 112, the opening theme song “Isshin Doutai” was also performed by Kyary Pamyu Pamyu. Since episode 113 the new opening theme song is "OEDOEDO" by Kyary Pamyu Pamyu. While up until episode 19, Wolpis Kater and NayutalieN performed the ending theme song "Ninjalaic Ninja". From episode 20 and up until episode 40, the ending theme song "SHINOBI TOP SECRET" was performed by Wienners. From episode 41 and up until episode 57, the anime presented another ending theme song, named “Friendship March” which is performed by Fantastic Paisen. From episode 58 to episode 65, the ending theme, titled “Ninja Remotion” was performed by Ange☆Reve. From episode 66 to episode 79, the anime revealed a 5th ending theme song, titled “Radice” which is performed by Wolpis Kater and Neru. From episode 80 to episode 100, another ending theme song was unveiled, titled, “Appare! Extreme Ninja” by SHARE LOCK HOMES. From episode 101 to episode 124, the ending theme, named "You and Doron in Broad Daylight" by Pop Shinanaide, was played. From episode 125 to episode 148, the ending theme was "TKG Syndrome" by Miyu Kaneko. From episode 149 to episode 172, the ending theme was "Night Before A Dance" by Panda Dragon. Starting with episode 173, the new ending theme is "Kesara Basara" by Yuko Suzuhana. The anime began streaming with English subtitles on the game's official YouTube channel on January 13, 2022. Episodes are released every Thursday at 7:00 p.m. (PT) and only available for one week.

Prior to the anime's release, several animated shorts were released depicting the backstory of the eight main protagonists. These shorts have since been retconned by the anime.

== Reception ==
=== Pre-release ===
The overall visual style of Ninjala has been widely compared to Nintendo's Splatoon franchise. Jordan Devore of Destructoid felt that Ninjala was hard to judge based on its early multiplayer demo at E3, noting the lack of playable weapons beyond baseball bats (though noticing that yo-yos had appeared as a disabled option in the menus), a need to improve the "flow and feel" of its gameplay, and the lack of "good" lock-on targeting functionality. However, he felt that "there's something to this gum-loving ninja concept for sure", and that Ninjala was "worth following". He argued that alongside Splatoon, there was "plenty of room for more colorful, poppy, kid-friendly multiplayer games". IGN similarly noted that its concept felt like "Splatoon meets Arms", and that "if GungHo makes good on delivering creative weaponry and polishes up the combat, Ninjala might just have what it takes to beat Nintendo at its own game."

Following the 2020 open beta, Connor Sheridan of GamesRadar+ noted that the game's fundamentals had an initial learning curve (especially in comparison to Splatoon), but that "figuring out how to string attacks together for maximum points and minimum chance of reprisal" had a strategic depth similar to fighting games, and that he was "pleasantly surprised" by the number of character customization options. Siliconera described the game as "trying to appeal to the fans of its larger cousin [Splatoon] without replacing it", noting that the drone mechanic added a "MOBA-like" progression that could potentially influence strategy among coordinated teams, but that the tutorial video provided by the beta was "not particularly effective at explaining the uses and advantages of each kind of attack" as opposed to an in-game tutorial, and the server capacity issues from the beta showed that there was "still significant work to do to build a stable environment for launch next month".

=== Post-release ===
Reception

Aggregate scores
Aggregator	Score
Metacritic	68/100
OpenCritic	64% recommend

Review scores
Publication	Score
Destructoid	6.5/10
GameSpot	6/10
Nintendo Life	7/10
USgamer	3/5

Ninjala received "mixed or average" reviews from critics, according to the review aggregation website Metacritic. Fellow review aggregator OpenCritic assessed that the game received fair approval, being recommended by 64% of critics.

Nintendo Life gave the game 7 of 10. They praised the art style, the overall gameplay, weapons, customisation options and gyro controls, but were critical of the story mode, tutorial mode, some notable gameplay aspects (such as the parrying system) and single-use items.

Michael Therkelsen from Gayming Magazine stated "While battle game-play is relatively easy, the customization of your avatar and in-game stores are quite difficult to figure out", also criticizing the game for being "ultimately too repetitive".

Ninjala reached 10 million downloads as of February 2023.
