= Train to the End of the World =

2024 Japanese anime television series

- Key visual featuring the four main characters

終末トレインどこへいく？ (Shūmatsu Torein Doko e Iku?)
- Genre: Post-apocalyptic, science fantasy, slice of life, surreal comedy
- Created by: apogeego
- Manga
- Written by: apogeego
- Illustrated by: Torimura
- Published by: Media Factory
- Imprint: MF Comics
- Magazine: KadoComi
- Original run: March 25, 2024 – June 30, 2025
- Volumes: 3
- Anime television series
- Directed by: Tsutomu Mizushima; Fumihiko Suganuma (Note: Episode Direction Chief (演出チーフ))
- Written by: Michiko Yokote
- Music by: Miho Tsujibayashi
- Studio: EMT Squared
- Licensed by: Crunchyroll
- Original network: AT-X, Tokyo MX, KBS Kyoto, SUN, BS11
- Original run: April 1, 2024 – June 24, 2024
- Episodes: 12
- icon

Train to the End of the World (終末トレインどこへいく？, Shūmatsu Torein Doko e Iku?; lit. 'Where Does the Doomsday Train Go?') is an original Japanese anime television series produced by Kadokawa, animated by EMT Squared, and directed by Tsutomu Mizushima, with Michiko Yokote handling series composition, Asako Nishida handling character designs based on namo's original designs, and Miho Tsujibayashi composing the music. It aired from April to June 2024. A manga adaptation illustrated by Torimura was serialized on Kadokawa's KadoComi manga website from March 2024 to June 2025.

== Plot ==
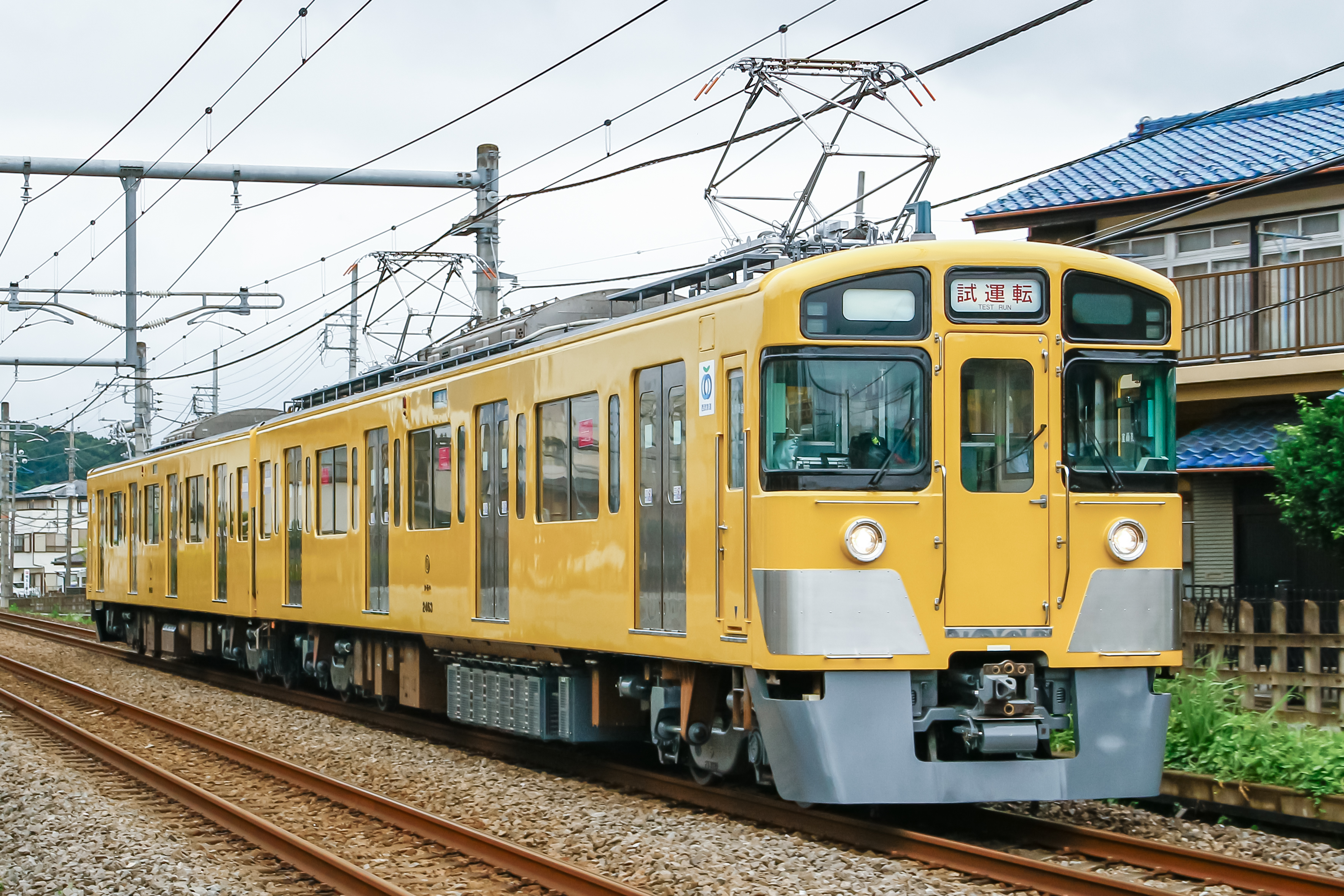
The girls ride a two-car Seibu 2000 passenger train like the one in this picture. It was christened the "Apogee" in Episode 6. (Trainset 2463 shown here is also the one portrayed in the anime.)

After the catastrophic launch of an experimental 7G cellular network warps reality, Japan is left devastated, with civilization collapsing and being reduced to scattered, isolated settlements. The launch, known as the 7G Incident, has also caused strange phenomena and affected the surviving population, such as the residents near Agano Station transforming into intelligent animals once they turn 21. Two years after the 7G Incident, student and Agano resident Shizuru Chikura finds evidence that her missing friend and classmate Yoka Nakatomi is alive and in Ikebukuro. With the landscape too dangerous to travel on foot, Shizuru and her friends commandeer an abandoned Seibu 2000 passenger train, which they later name the "Apogee", to follow the Seibu Ikebukuro Line to Ikebukuro and reunite with Yoka.

== Characters ==
=== Main characters ===
Shizuru Chikura (千倉 静留, Chikura Shizuru)
Voiced by: Chika Anzai
A student and resident of Agano. She lives with her grandmother and mother, who were turned into animals following the 7G Incident. Shizuru has spent the past two years since the 7G Incident searching for Yoka, who disappeared after they had a falling out; it is later revealed that their argument was because Shizuru would not support Yoka's dream. After learning that Yoka is in Ikebukuro, Shizuru and her friends commandeer an abandoned Seibu 2000 passenger train and head for Ikebukuro to reunite with her.
Nadeshiko Hoshi (星 撫子, Hoshi Nadeshiko)
Voiced by: Azumi Waki
A gentle and polite student who accompanies Shizuru on her journey to Ikebukuro and acts as the group's peacemaker, often breaking up fights between Reimi and Akira.
Reimi Kuga (久賀 玲実, Kuga Reimi)
Voiced by: Erisa Kuon
An energetic and cheerful student who accompanies Shizuru on her journey to Ikebukuro and often gets into fights with Akira due to their conflicting personalities. She has the appearance of a gyaru.
Akira Shinonome (東雲 晶, Shinonome Akira)
Voiced by: Hina Kino
An intelligent but withdrawn student who accompanies Shizuru on her journey to Ikebukuro and tends to keep to herself. She often gets into fights with Reimi due to their conflicting personalities.

=== Supporting characters ===
Yōka Nakatomi (中富 葉香, Nakatomi Yōka)
Voiced by: Nao Tōyama
Shizuru's best friend, who had a falling out with her and left Agano for Ikebukuro after she discouraged her from achieving her goal of becoming an astronomer and has been trapped there since the 7G Incident. It is later revealed that 7G turned her into a witch queen who can manipulate reality and rules over Ikebukuro; however, the effects of 7G also begins to slowly drain her life. It is also revealed that Pontaro erased her memories to prevent her from revealing the truth behind 7G's failure to the world and manipulated her into helping him eliminate those who know. After her memories are restored, she reverses 7G and returns home with Shizuru and her friends.
Zenjirō Taira (平 善治郎, Taira Zenjirō)
Voiced by: Kazuyuki Okitsu
A mysterious train conductor who lived in Agano. He teaches Shizuru how to operate the train and communicates with her group by tapping on the train tracks to generate Morse code. After arriving in Agano, he managed to retain his humanity but lost his sanity, which he can temporarily regain for five minutes a day while wearing his conductor's cap. He holds a deep grudge against Pontaro, the inventor of 7G, and has sworn revenge against him, and it is implied that he was involved in the creation of 7G.
Pochi-san (ポチさん)
Yoka's pet dog, who was seemingly unaffected by 7G and accompanies Shizuru and her friends to Ikebukuro.
Makoto Angstrom Gappa (甲把(ガッパ)・マコト・オングストローム, Gappa Makoto Ongusutorōmu)
Voiced by: Yuka Iguchi
A doctor who helped build Inariyama's military base, but was overpowered and imprisoned by the Boss, who took over her role, and was shrunk along with Inariyama's people as a result of 7G. It is later revealed that she is one of the scientists who helped create 7G. She is later freed by Shizuru's group, and after the Boss is defeated, she decides to return to Agano to reunite with Zenjiro, who knew her in the past. She grows to 1.6x of her normal size (a giant in comparison to the others) after 7G's reversal.
Neko (ネコ)
Voiced by: Junji Majima
The leader of the Black Leopards, a group which makes deliveries across Japan.
Mito Kuroki (黒木 ミト, Kuroki Mito)
Voiced by: Konomi Kohara
The queen of the zombies, whom Shizuru encounters after abandoning her friends. She is actually a human who disguised herself as a zombie to control them, as she considers them as a family and useful servants. When Shizuru and her friends offer to take her to Ikebukuro, she refuses, having decided that her rightful place is with the zombies, but later reunites with them to help them stop Pontaro. She maintains her status as the zombie queen even after 7G is reversed, as her zombies (who are now human) still exist.
Sū-chan (スーちゃん)
Voiced by: Shiori Izawa
A character from the popular manga and anime Alice in Nerima Land, who was brought into existence by 7G alongside her friends and is the only surviving main character after they were killed prior to Shizuru and her friends' arrival. She later dies after they fail to revive her friends.
Old Man
This unnamed man is usually seen traveling across Japan on a swan-like boat. He met Shizuru and her friends at some points and gave them maps to help them. He also unintentionally helped the girls in the final confrontation against Pontaro where he and his boat crushed the latter when he tried to escape with Yoka.

=== Antagonists ===
Poison Pontarō (ポイズン・ポンタロー, Poizun Pontarō)
Voiced by: Daisuke Namikawa
An eccentric but insecure scientist from Ikebukuro who invented 7G to improve life, but instead changed reality. However, he decided not to reverse the effects of 7G because he did not want anyone to know that it backfired. To avoid getting into trouble with the public, he erases Yōka's memories and uses her as a puppet queen, manipulating her to eliminate witnesses. He is even willing to go as far as to murder those who try to undo 7G. Following his defeat, he is turned into an egg custard after 7G is reversed.
Pochi (ポチ)
Voiced by: Takeaki Masuyama
Pontaro's henchman, who is named after Yoka's dog. He is a strong fighter and was previously a crow that was turned into a human by 7G. He later turns on Pontaro due to him mostly caring for Yoka's safety. After 7G is undone, he turns back into a crow.
The Boss (ボス, Bosu)
Voiced by: Atsushi Abe
A man who likes bases, planes and other military weapons and wanted to join the military, but was told he was not smart or athletic enough to join. His name is unknown. He is also an ally to Pontaro. After the 7G Incident, he went to Inariyama and, after discovering that the people there were shrunk, took over and made the lower class make electricity for him. He also locked up Doctor Makoto, fearing that she could find a way to return everyone to normal. After Reimi defeats him, he is banished to an island in Sayama Lake. In the final episode, he aids Pontaro in the final battle against the girls, but is defeated. His fate remains unknown afterwards.
Chaos (渾沌, Konton)
Voiced by: Yuichi Nakamura
A humanoid cat who is the main villain of Alice in Nerima Land, brought into existence by 7G along with its protagonists. He works for Yoka and Pontaro, who ordered him to keep people away from Ikebukuro. After his henchmen are defeated by Shizuru and her friends, he flees to warn Yoka and Pontaro about them. In the final episode, he aids Pontaro in the final battle against the girls, but is defeated. His fate remains unknown afterwards.

== Media ==
=== Manga ===
A manga adaptation, illustrated by Torimura and told from Akira's perspective, was serialized on Kadokawa's KadoComi manga website from March 25, 2024, to June 30, 2025. Three tankōbon volumes were released from June 21, 2024, to July 23, 2025.

No.	Release date	ISBN
1	June 21, 2024	978-4-04-811307-6
2	December 23, 2024	978-4-04-684140-7
3	July 23, 2025	978-4-04-684900-7

=== Anime ===
The original anime television series was announced on Railway Day on October 14, 2022, which celebrates the 150th anniversary of Japan's first railway. It was directed by Tsutomu Mizushima and written by Michiko Yokote, both of whom had previously worked on the anime series Shirobako and The Magnificent Kotobuki, and features animation production by EMT Squared, original character designs by namo, animation character designs by Asako Nishida, and music composed by Miho Tsujibayashi. The series aired from April 1 to June 24, 2024, on AT-X and other networks and ran for 12 episodes. The opening theme is "GA-TAN GO-TON", performed by Rei Nakashima, while the ending theme is "Eureka", performed by Rokudenashi. Crunchyroll streamed the series.

==== Episodes ====
No.	Title (Note: All English titles are taken from Crunchyroll.)	Directed by (Note: Information is taken from the ending credits of each episode.)	Written by	Storyboarded by	Original release date
1	"I'll Be Going Now"; Transliteration: "Chotto Ittekuru" (Japanese: ちょっと行ってくる)	Tsutomu Mizushima	Michiko Yokote	Tsutomu Mizushima	April 1, 2024
Two years after the disastrous launch of an experimental 7G cellular network that warped reality, Japan has been left devastated with civilization reduced to various scattered, isolated settlements. Strange phenomena are now commonplace throughout the country such as the people of the town of Agano being transformed into intelligent animals once they reach the age of 21. Shizuru Chikura, Nadeshiko Hoshi, Reimi Kuga, and Akira Shinonome are four students native to Agano who are left to wonder about their future, knowing they will inevitably turn into animals as well once they come of age. They then find a newspaper showing that their missing classmate Yoka Nakatomi is still alive in Ikebukuro, but have no way of getting there. That night, Shizuru finds a train conductor's cap and returns it to a feral Tairo Zenjiro, who suddenly regains his sanity and reveals he has a grudge against Pontaro, the inventor of 7G, and seeks to get revenge on him. Unable to leave Agano himself, Zenjiro teaches Shizuru how to operate an abandoned Seibu 2000 passenger train. Shizuru's mother respects her daughter's decision to leave for Ikebukuro and after announcing that she is dropping out of school, Shizuru prepares for her trip. As she starts up the train, Nadeshiko, Remi, Akira, and Yoka's dog Pochi decide to accompany Shizuru and they begin the long trek to Ikebukuro, which is 30 stops away.
2	"Suppose, Maybe, Presumably"; Transliteration: "Suisoku, Darou, Omowareru" (Japanese: 推測、だろう、思われる)	Fumihiko Suganuma	Michiko Yokote	Fumihiko Suganuma	April 8, 2024
Riding the train, the girls soon reach the Koma River, where they experience sharp turns. They soon come to realize that in their haste to leave Agano, none of them had thought to bring adequate supplies for the trip. Shizuru reveals that she did bring some supplies, including a bitter melon plant. They then come across an eccentric old man from Ikebukruo, who is exploring the Koma River using a swan boat. They trade cigarettes for his map of the river and rail line, but the man warns them that route to Ikebukuro will be dangerous; the map that he gave them proves to be anything but helpful. They learn to communicate with Zenjiro through Morse code via banging the train tracks. Reimi then suggests that they turn back and return to Agano to properly stock up on supplies. However, a tsunami suddenly forms behind the train, forcing Shizuru to drive forward at full speed in order to outrun it. They are able to escape the tsunami, but it destroys the bridge behind them, forcing them to continue forward toward Ikebukuro. Eventually, they reach Higashi-Agano Station where they are greeted by the local populace, who are humans with mushrooms growing out of the tops of their heads.
3	"Short, Happy and Easy"; Transliteration: "Shōto de Happīījī ni" (Japanese: ショートでハッピーイージーに)	Takahiko Usui	Michiko Yokote	Jong Heo	April 15, 2024
The girls find the residents of Higashi-Agano to be very friendly and hospitable, and they are allowed to stay the night in a vacant house. However, Akira is uneasy at how friendly the residents seem to be, and catches sight of them watching her and the girls from afar. That night, Akira wakes up and heads for the bathroom, but stumbles upon a meeting between the residents who are planning to force the girls to join their town, but has to run when she is spotted. Akira is found by her friends, but the residents claim she simply had a nightmare. The next day, the girls' departure is delayed by the train being covered in bitter melon vines. As they remove the vines and obtain supplies, the girls except Akira begin growing apathetic as mushrooms begin growing out of their heads. Akira manages to remind Shizuru about her desire to reunite with Yoka, and she removes her mushroom and helps rescue Reimi and Nadeshiko. The residents reveal that since they no longer want to live in a world ruined by the 7G Incident, they voluntarily allow themselves to be infected by parasitic mushrooms that remove their negative emotions, but at the cost of killing them in two years. Seeing that the residents do not want to be saved, the girls board the train and continue on their journey; upset that the girls don't want to join them, the residents reluctantly let them leave. However, Akira realizes to her horror that something is growing on her back.
4	"Why Are You Hiding Your Butt?"; Transliteration: "Nande Oshiri Kakusu no?" (Japanese: なんでおしり隠すの？)	Tsutomu Mizushima	Shigeru Murakoshi	Jong Heo; Tsutomu Mizushima	April 22, 2024
As the girls contemplate how long it will take to reach Ikebukuro, Akira hides the growth on her back. When the train arrives at Musashi-Yokote Station, the girls are forced to keep moving when they come under attack from a herd of humanoid goats. That night, the girls decide to take turns driving the train to give Shizuru a chance to rest, and Akira remains in denial that something is growing on her back, fearing it is a mushroom. The train then arrives at Koma Station, but the girls decide to keep moving when they see the area infested with living turnips. They pass Higashi-Hannō Station as it rains golf balls, and find trees shaped like humans at Hannō Station. Other visited places include an area with giant craters, a field of tall dirt spires, a dark field of tiny lights, an ordinary train station, a station full of sentient but immobile jizo statues, a foggy grassland, and an area full of giant organs. The girls finally notice the mushrooms growing on Akira's back and remove them, but she reverts to a childlike personality. Zenjiro fears Akira's brain might be affected and advises the girls to see a doctor who lives near Inariyama-kōen Station. Upon arriving at Inariyama, Shizuru and Reimi leave the train to the explore the area and find a miniature town, only be attacked by miniature Japanese Self Defense Forces. They are both knocked unconscious and later awake to find themselves tied to a helicopter's propellers.
5	"I'll Be Reduced to Bones"; Transliteration: "Hone ni Sarete Shimaimasu" (Japanese: 骨にされてしまいます)	Masayuki Iimura; Takahiko Usui; Tsutomu Mizushima	Shigeru Murakoshi	Jong Heo	April 29, 2024
The miniature soldiers interrogate Shizuru and Reimi and become concerned when they learn they are looking for the Doctor. After the soldiers leave, the girls convince a groundskeeper to help free them despite the punishment that she may receive for helping them. The groundskeeper explains that the 7G experiment caused Inariyama, the nearby JSDF military base, and all of its inhabitants to shrink. Doctor Makoto helped organize Inariyama to deal with the incident, up until the Boss overthrew her and seized control of the city. Shizuru and Reimi manage to rescue Makoto from the base, and discover the Boss is simply a normal sized human like them, Shizuru helps them escape, but gets knocked out. Reimi takes Makoto back to the train where she reveals she was a 7G scientist who worked alongside Zenjiro and Pontaro. Makoto theorizes Akira is suffering from "7G wave brain phenomenon", where a person's physical state is affected by their own self perception. She suggests feeding Akira a mushroom to convince her she is cured, Shizuru wakes up in the Boss's room and he explains to her about himself and after 7G incident, the smitten Boss attempts to make a bargain with her, but then Reimi returns to the base to rescue her and collect a mushroom. During the fighting, Reimi's bracelet, which was a gift from Akira, gets broken, and she goes berserk, easily defeating the military and the Boss before Shizuru calms her down. Reimi then feeds Akira the mushrooms, but when that doesn't work, she force feeds pages from Akira's favorite book to her, which cures her. Afterwards, the people of Inariyama exile the Boss to an isolated island for his crimes and Makoto decides to travel to Agano to reunite with Zenjiro. The girls bid them farewell as they continue on to Ikebukuro.
6	"Was What I Said That Awful?"; Transliteration: "Sonna ni Hidoi koto Itta kana" (Japanese: そんなにひどいこと言ったかな)	Harume Kosaka	Michiko Yokote	Fumihiko Suganuma	May 6, 2024
With the events of Inariyama behind them and Akira back to normal, the girls continue to the next stop. As they do, they decide to name the train the "Apogee". After stopping for a break and noticing Pochi seems to be sick, Nadeshiko asks Shizuru why exactly Yoka left Agano, since she was the last person to see her. Shizuru is reluctant to talk at first, but admits that during their last meeting together, Yoka told her about here dreams to become an astronomer. However, instead of encouraging her, Shizuru instead tried to convince Yoka that her dream was impossible and that she was better off staying in Agano. Offended at Shizuru's words, Yoka had a falling out with her and decided to leave for Ikebukuro. The other girls then get in an argument with Shizuru over her insensitive nature, leading to Shizuru angrily leaving the train with Pochi. The girls decide to let Shizuru have a chance to cool down. Shizuru tries to follow the train tracks on foot, but then tries to take a shortcut through the forest and gets lost before being captured by a group of zombies. She is then brought before the self-proclaimed zombie queen Mito Kuroki, who explains she is leading her zombies to find a place with a suitable climate where they won't rot or mummify. Meanwhile, the girls become worried when they can't find Shizuru. They happen to cross paths with the Black Leopard caravan, and their leader Neko warns them about zombies in the area. Despite this, the girls are determined to rescue Shizuru so they can travel to Ikebukuro together.
7	"A Zombie That Laughs Is No Zombie at All"; Transliteration: "Warau Zonbi wa Zonbi ja nai" (Japanese: 笑うゾンビはゾンビじゃない)	Fumihiko Suganuma	Michiko Yokote	Fumihiko Suganuma	May 13, 2024
After installing a flag on the train to let them know where it is, Reimi, Akira, and Nadeshiko head into the forest to search for Shizuru. Upon encountering a group of zombies, the girls disguise themselves as zombies and follow them to an abandoned shrine where Mito has made her new camp. The girls find Shizuru, but are caught by Mito due to their squabbling, who is uncertain if they are human or zombie. Mito subjects them to several tests, and quickly figures out that they are still human primarily due to hearing them laugh, pointing out that zombies cannot laugh. She then orders her zombies to attack the girls and they do their best to defend themselves. However, while the zombies are individually weak, they cannot be killed and begin to overwhelm the girls. They decide to resort to a theory they heard from Neko and make sexually suggestive comments to arouse the zombies. Unable to handle arousal, many of the zombies explode, giving the girls the opening they need to escape back to the train. Mito blocks the rails with her zombies, and while the girls have learned a raunchy song guaranteed to destroy the zombies from Zenjiro, Shizuru instead approaches Mito and confirms she is human. Mito admits that she accidentally became the queen of the zombies, but eventually felt pity for them and stayed as their queen to protect them. Having now befriended Shizuru and her group, Mito allows them to continue on to Ikebukuro but warns them the city has its own queen ruling it; though offered to join them, she turns it down as she knew that the zombies need her.
8	"Isn't That Bad Karma?"; Transliteration: "Bachi Ataranai?" (Japanese: バチ当たらない？)	Tsutomu Mizushima	Tsutomu Mizushima	Tsutomu Mizushima	May 20, 2024
Following the zombie encounter, the girls reach Higashi-Kurume Station but keep moving when they are suddenly hit with a heavy itching sensation. They then reach Hibarigaoka Station where they are suddenly overcome by traumatic memories from their pasts. Later, continue on to Ōizumi-gakuen Station, whose population was turned into "Darkizumites", a species of humanoid pigs from the popular manga and anime Alice in Nerima Land and live happily with the hero Alice and her friends. However, upon reaching the station, they find that the city has been taken over by Alice's arch-nemesis Chaos, with Alice and her friends killed and the Darkizumites living under Chaos' oppression. Upon hearing the girls are heading to Ikebukuro, Chaos has his henchmen attack them since he is under orders to prevent anybody from reaching the city. The girls flee and manage to find Sū-chan, one of Alice's friends who managed to escape. They attempt to resurrect Alice and her friends, but the ritual fails and Sū-chan dies as well. The Darkizumites then appoint the girls to be successors to Alice and her friends, giving them their costumes. Using their knowledge of Shogi, the girls defeat Chaos' henchmen, forcing him to flee to warn the Witch Queen of Ikebukuro, who he reveals to be Yoka, although the girls find this hard to believe. The Darkizumites request for them to be their new leaders, but they decline as they are unwilling to abandon their journey. The Darkizumites are unable to take no for an answer, but could not keep the girls from leaving as the Apogee was too fast. As the girls continue on to Ikebukuro, they are left wondering what exactly happened to Yoka.
9	"More Boring Than I Thought"; Transliteration: "Omotteta yori Tsumannai Mitai na" (Japanese: 思ってたよりつまんないみたいな)	Yoshihiko Iwata	Michiko Yokote	Satoshi Shimizu	May 27, 2024
It's revealed that after the 7G Incident, Pontaro erased Yoka's memories to cover up the fact that 7G was a failure. However, as the person who triggered the 7G Incident, Yoka has the power to change reality to her whims, and Pontaro, who is fearful of getting in trouble with the world, chose to leave the world as it is and tries his best to manipulate her as a puppet ruler while he tasks a servant she calls "Pochi" to keep an eye on her. Meanwhile, the girls continue on their way to Ikebukuro and encounter the old man who gave them the map. They save him from a waterfall, and he warns them that Ikebukuro is expanding uncontrollably which will soon cause the end of all existence. Back at Agano, Makoto is able to communicate with Zenjiro even when he isn't lucid, and Zenjiro explains that Ikebukuro's expansion is analogous to the Big Rip, which will eventually destroy the universe through entropy. Back at the train, the old man gives the girls a new map and parts ways, warning them that Ikebukuro is extremely dangerous due to the Witch Queen. The girls begin to grow concerned that Yoka really has become a witch. At Ikebukuro, Pontaro warns Pochi the servant to watch out for the girls and eliminate them before they can meet Yoka, fearing that their presence might restore her memories and expose the truth, but is unaware of the upcoming destruction, while Yoka begins to wonder why she is in Ikebukuro.
10	"A True Symbol of Rebellion and Decadence"; Transliteration: "Kore Koso Hankō to Taihai no Akashi" (Japanese: これこそ反抗と退廃の証)	Harume Kosaka	Shigeru Murakoshi	Shinichi Watanabe	June 3, 2024
The girls continue towards Ikebukuro until they come across a trio of animals stranded on the tracks and they realize that they are search party led by Shizuru's father who left Agano two years ago and never returned. After a brief reunion, Shizuru's father explains that he and his party were heading to Ikebukuro to investigate the city before they were intercepted by a hostile group in Shiinamachi Station and forced to retreat. At that moment, Zenjiro contacts the girls and confirms that the end of the world is imminent and the only way to avert it is to shut off 7G. Shizuru and her group decide to continue on to Ikebukuro to find Yoka, and convince her father and his group to head back to Agano to reunite with their families. They reach Shiinamachi but are forced to stop when they see the tracks are blocked by a massive chasm, and are attacked by a trio of mangaka. The girls are no match for the mangakas' powers until Akira learns that their powers stem from the berets they wear. Using a beret Shizuru's father had stolen, the girls steal their berets and defeat the three mangaka. The mangaka explain that they received their berets from Yoka and were ordered by Pontaro to stop them. Shizuru recalls Pontaro's name from Zenjiro, and the girls deduce that Yoka is being manipulated by him. Seeing that they had been used, the mangaka cancel the subscription on their powers, reverting everything they changed back to normal and restoring the rail line. With the path clear, the girls head to the final stop at Ikebukuro.
11	"Maybe She's a Lost Cause..."; Transliteration: "Mō Muri ka na……" (Japanese: もう無理かな……)	Fumihiko Suganuma; Naoya Murakawa	Michiko Yokote	Fumihiko Suganuma	June 10, 2024
The girls finally arrive in Ikebukuro, but crash into the station due to Shizuru going too fast. After fighting Pontaro's henchmen, they locate Yoka, but she fails to remember them and unleashes powerful shockwaves that affect reality around them. Pontaro discovers their presence and orders his henchmen to capture them, but they manage to escape. Realizing that the girls' presence has worsened the situation, Pontaro sees that putting the 7G button and Yoka together was a bad idea and decides to separate them. The girls discover that the bitter melon plant in the Apogee has connected to the tracks and they use it as a makeshift phone to contact Zenjiro and Makoto, who instruct them to push the button to reverse 7G's effects on the world, also explaining that the reason why Pontaro doesn't want 7G to be undone is because he wants to avoid being punished for his mistake. The girls reunite with Mito, who informs them that her zombies are reacting to the 7G button and deducts that they want to be human again. They search the city for the button, eventually finding it in a fountain. Pochi and Pontaro's guards find them. The girls and zombies fight them while Mito and Akira retrieve the button. Pochi proves to be too powerful for the girls, but for some reason, he is unwilling to attack Pochi-san. Akira and Mito push the button, but reality remains the same. The girls then notice Pontaro escaping with Yoka on a train to another location, with Pontaro pointing out that only Yoka can shut off 7G.
11.5	"Recap ～So Far on Train to the End of the World～"; Transliteration: "Sōshūhen ～Kore Made no Shūmatsu Torein～" (Japanese: 総集編 ～これまでの終末トレイン～)	Unknown	Unknown	TBA	June 17, 2024
A recap of the previous eleven episodes, told from Shizuru's point of view.
12	"What Was Normal Again?"; Transliteration: "Itsumottenani Dakke" (Japanese: いつもって何だっけ)	Tsutomu Mizushima	Michiko Yokote	Tsutomu Mizushima	June 24, 2024 (Note: Due to production circumstances, Episode 12 was delayed a week from its originally scheduled air date of June 17, 2024.)
Realizing that they need Yoka to push the 7G button to shut it off, the girls, Mito, and the zombies chase Pontaro in the Apogee as he tries to fight them off, aided by Chaos and the Boss. The girls manage to board his train and confront him. Pochi, having stowed away, then arrives and turns on Pontaro and throws him off the train when he admits that 7G is slowly sapping away Yoka's life, stating he is only loyal to Yoka. Shizuru then reunites with Yoka and tries to jog her memory, apologizing for making fun of her dream and admitting she did it because she wanted Yoka to stay in Agano with her. Yoka is initially hostile towards Shizuru due to her long-held anger towards her, but Pochi-san's barking is able to make her stop. She eventually regains her memories thanks to the help of Shizuru and her friends and they convince her to reverse 7G's effects. Pontaro, having survived, tries one final attempt to prevent 7G's reversal by escaping with Yoka, but is foiled by the unexpected arrival of the old man, whose swan boat pins Pontaro to the ground. Yoka presses the 7G button and turns it off. The world is reverted back to its mostly normal state, but some of 7G's effects still linger. While human again, the former zombies still worship Mito as their queen, Pochi is turned back into his original form as a crow, Pontaro is turned into an egg custard, Makoto is now larger than normal, Zenjiro is slowly recovering to his normal state, and the populace of Agano are turned into humans with animal heads. The girls bid farewell to the old man and Mito as they leave Ikebukuro on their journey back to Agano. They see another train and wonder what other changes have occurred following 7G's reversal. Yoka asks Shizuru why she gave the Apogee its name. Shizuru replies that since "apogee" means the point where the Moon is farthest from Earth, that means the only direction it can go is closer to Earth, symbolizing their journey to reunite.

== See also ==
- The Coppersmith's Bride, a manga series by namo, the original character designer
