= Sugar Apple Fairy Tale =

Japanese light novel series

- First light novel volume cover

シュガーアップル・フェアリーテイル (Shugā Appuru Fearī Teiru)
- Genre: Fantasy
- Light novel
- Written by: Miri Mikawa
- Illustrated by: aki
- Published by: Kadokawa Shoten
- English publisher: NA: Yen Press
- Imprint: Kadokawa Beans Bunko
- Original run: March 31, 2010 – March 1, 2024
- Volumes: 20
- Manga
- Written by: Miri Mikawa
- Illustrated by: Alto Yukimura
- Published by: Hakusensha
- Magazine: Hana to Yume Online
- Original run: November 2012 – October 2014
- Volumes: 2
- Manga
- Written by: Miri Mikawa
- Illustrated by: Yozora no Udon
- Published by: Kadokawa Shoten
- English publisher: NA: Yen Press
- Magazine: Young Ace
- Original run: November 4, 2021 – December 4, 2023
- Volumes: 4
- Anime television series
- Directed by: Yōhei Suzuki
- Written by: Seishi Minakami
- Music by: Hinako Tsubakiyama
- Studio: J.C.Staff
- Licensed by: Crunchyroll; SEA: Muse Communication
- Original network: AT-X, Tokyo MX, BS Asahi, SUN, KBS Kyoto
- English network: US: Crunchyroll Channel
- Original run: January 6, 2023 – September 22, 2023
- Episodes: 24
- Manga
- Written by: Miri Mikawa
- Illustrated by: Konosagi
- Published by: Kadokawa Shoten
- Magazine: Flos Comic
- Original run: August 4, 2023 – April 4, 2025
- Volumes: 3
- icon

Sugar Apple Fairy Tale (シュガーアップル・フェアリーテイル, Shugā Appuru Fearī Teiru) is a Japanese fantasy light novel series written by Miri Mikawa and illustrated by aki. Kadokawa Shoten have published twenty volumes from March 2010 to March 2024 under their Kadokawa Beans Bunko imprint. A manga adaptation with art by Alto Yukimura was serialized online via Hakusensha's Hana to Yume Online website from November 2012 to October 2014. It was collected in two tankōbon volumes. A second manga adaptation with art by Yozora no Udon was serialized in Kadokawa Shoten's seinen manga magazine Young Ace from November 2021 to December 2023, and a third manga adaptation with art by Konosagi has been serialized online via Kadokawa Shoten's Flos Comic website since August 2023. Both the light novel and second manga are licensed in North America by Yen Press. An anime television series adaptation produced by J.C.Staff aired from January to September 2023.

== Plot ==
Anne Halford is a candy crafter determined to follow in her mother's footsteps and become a Silver Sugar Master, a title bestowed only by royalty. In order to travel to the capital and realize her dream, she purchases Challe, a handsome but foul-mouthed fairy, as her bodyguard. Anne wishes to befriend her new companion, but in this kingdom where fairies are treated as property upon possession of one of their wings, Challe wants nothing to do with humans.

== Characters ==
Anne Halford (アン・ハルフォード, An Harufōdo)
Voiced by: Yuka Nukui (Japanese); Celeste Perez (English)
Anne is the main protagonist and a Silver Sugar artisan, who is determined to follow in the footsteps of her recently deceased mother and become a Silver Sugar master. Anne leaves home to travel to the Royal Candy Fair to participate in its contest to win the Sugar Master title and purchases Challe, a warrior fairy to protect her in their travels, but promises to return his wing. Anne does not like the idea of fairies being forced into slavery and believes it is possible for fairies and humans to become friends. Anne is a hard working and gifted Sugar artisan, who continues to improve her skills as she meets more artisans and masters along her journey. Anne begins to fall in love with Challe as the story continues.
Challe Fen Challe (シャル・フェン・シャル, Sharu Fen Sharu)
Voiced by: Masaaki Mizunaka (Japanese); Ivan Jasso (English)
Challe is an obsidian warrior fairy who was purchased by Anne to serve as her bodyguard. Although very handsome and beautiful, Challe has a sharp tongue and constantly teases Anne, frequently calling her scarecrow. In the past, he was close friends with a young girl called Elizabeth, until she was killed by humans. Due to his years of enslavement and Liz's death, he distrusts humans, but gradually begins to grow close to Anne and decides to stay with her after she returns his wing. Over the course of the story, Challe becomes very protective of Anne and finds himself falling in love with her.
Mithril Lid Pod (ミスリル・リッド・ポッド, Misuriru Riddo Poddo)
Voiced by: Rie Takahashi (Japanese); Ciarán Strange (English)
Mithril is a water fairy who was saved by Anne from a ruthless fairy hunter. Although he dislikes humans, he is determined to repay the favor to Anne and becomes a friend and traveling companion on her journey. He ties his wing around his neck in the style of a scarf and prefers to be called by his full name. He is also aware of Anne's love for Challe and fully supports their relationship.
Hugh Mercury (ヒュー・マーキュリー, Hyū Mākyurī)
Voiced by: Tomoaki Maeno (Japanese); Ernesto Jason Liebrecht (English)
Hugh is the Silver Sugar Viscount who befriends Anne on her journey. He is impressed by Anne's skills and pushes her to be better in order to help inspire her own original work.
Kat (キャット, Kyatto) / Alph Hingley (アルフ・ヒングリー, Arufu Hingurī)
Voiced by: Takuma Terashima (Japanese); Ben Balmaceda (English)
Kat is a Silver Sugar master who resides in the town of Lewiston. When his sugar confection order is destroyed in a robbery attempt, he falsely assumes Anne is responsible and has her work for him temporarily. Despite his harsh and tough demeanor, he respects Anne's hard work and skills and is willing to admit to his own mistakes, apologizing when she proves her innocence. He does not like people of high society or tolerate those who treat others unfairly, refusing to sell to customers he dislikes or petty artisans who harass Anne. Kat's real name is Alph Hingley and he dislikes his nickname. He is also acquainted with Hugh Mercury and Keith Powell.
Jonas Anders (ジョナス・アンダー, Jonasu Andā)
Voiced by: Reiji Kawashima (Japanese); Matt Shipman (English)
Jonas is Anne's former friend turned rival and nephew of the Radcliffe Workshop headmaster Marcus Radcliffe. He attends the Radcliffe Workshop as a sugar artisan, but lacks skill and ingenuity. Originally, he appears kind and helpful. Jonas is also determined to marry Anne, until he later drops his façade and reveals his true colors as a selfish manipulator after accomplishing his real plan: to steal Anne's sugar confection and present it as his own work at the Royal Candy fair. However, his plan fails after he is exposed as a cheater, which is proven when he is unable to replicate the piece. Jonas and Anne continue to hold a rivalry and dislike of each other. Despite his arrogance, Jonas is bullied by his uncle's apprentice, Sammy Jones, and tries to stay out of trouble whilst preparing for the next Royal exhibition until he is later kicked out in the aftermath of Sammy's assault against Anne and flees for his life, refusing to get involved with Anne further. Later, he is seen getting drunk, apparently quits being an artisan and Anne reveals his name was cleared and he can return to Ratcliffe workshop. He refuses because he doesn't want to be compared to Keith, laments that he's a failure as an artisan. Anne manages to get through to him and he tells her he still wants to make sugar confections and he joins the Paige workshop. After Anne and Challe returned from Lafalle, Jonas looks away as he has not forgotten the cruel things he did to Anne at the beginning of the series.
Keith Powell (キース・パウエル, Kīsu Paueru)
Voiced by: Yūto Uemura (Japanese); Ryan Negron (English)
Keith is the son of the previous Silver Sugar Viscount. Since childhood, Keith has spent most of his life surrounded by sugar confections and has met many artisans, including Kat and Anne's late mother. He is well respected among his peers and aspires to become a silver sugar master himself, but due to his father's position, never entered the Royal Fair to prevent rumors of favoritism or unfairness. Following the death of his father, Keith decides to participate in the competition and currently attends the Radcliffe Workshop. He is a sincere young man who offers to help Anne due to their similar upbringings and circumstances and sees her as a worthy rival unlike Jonas and Sammy.
Elliot Collins (エリオット・コリンズ, Eriotto Korinzu)
Voiced by: Kazuyuki Okitsu (Japanese); Jordan Dash Cruz (English)
Elliot is a silver sugar master from the Paige Workshop and serves as its representative due to the headmaster's poor health. Though flirtatious and easygoing, he is dependable and level-headed, caring deeply about the workshop and stepping up when it matters. Despite his relaxed demeanor, he is highly skilled and consistently supports Anne and the others whenever they need him. He is also engaged to Bridget Paige.
Bridget Paige (ブリジット・ペイジ, Burijitto Peiji)
Voiced by: Ayumi Mano (Japanese); Marisa Duran (English)
Bridget is the daughter of Glen Paige, head of the Paige Workshop, and is arranged to marry Elliot Collins despite lacking any interest in him. She becomes infatuated with Challe after meeting him and grows resentful of Anne, frustrated that she was never allowed to become a sugar artisan herself. Her jealousy leads her to support attempts to undermine Anne, and she only agrees to expose Sammy Jones after forcing Challe to surrender his wing. Her possessiveness worsens until a crisis involving Gladus, a fairy she trusted, injures members of the workshop. Realizing her actions enabled the incident, Bridget shows remorse and apologizes. She gradually matures and later develops a genuine affection for Orland during the Holy Beginnings Festival.
Cathy (キャシー, Kyashī)
Voiced by: Aya Yamane (Japanese); Naya Moreno (English)
Cathy is a labor fairy belonging to Jonas and is secretly in love with him.
Benjamin (ベンジャミン)
Voiced by: Minori Suzuki (Japanese); Monica Rial (English)
Benjamin is a labor fairy and belongs to Kat. He is easily tired and often sleeping, but always happily obeys Kat's orders and gets the job done. He is revealed to have possession of his wing, but willingly chooses to stay with Kat.
William Alburn (ウィリアム・アルバーン, Uiriamu Arubān)
Voiced by: Koki Uchiyama (Japanese); Chris Guerrero (English)
William is the Duke of Philax, who summons Anne to create a sugar confection for him. He once fell in love with the water fairy Christina, the only one who understood the pain and humiliation he endured at the hands of the kingdom. But water fairies live short lives, and her death left him devastated. Consumed by grief, he abandoned his duties as duke, ultimately leading to his subjugation by the Earl of Downing. Anne helps him find closure by allowing him to see Christina once more through a sugar confection.
Sammy Jones (サミー・ジョーンズ, Sammi Jōnzu)
Voiced by: Taishi Murata (Japanese); William Ofoegbu (English)
Sammy is a sugar artisan and longtime apprentice at the Radcliffe Workshop. Arrogant and dismissive toward those he deems beneath him, he resents Anne due to a misunderstanding about the previous Royal Candy Fair and refuses to acknowledge her as a fellow artisan. Highly regarded at the workshop and considered a top contender for the upcoming exhibition, he uses his status to bully and sabotage her. He orchestrates an attack on Anne through Jonas but avoids punishment by shifting the blame entirely onto Jonas. On the day of the contest, Sammy attempts further interference until Bridget exposes his actions, resulting in his disqualification and disciplinary action by the headmaster.
Orland Langston (オーランド・ラングストン, Ōrando Rangusuton)
Voiced by: Nobuhiko Okamoto (Japanese); Mauricio Ortiz-Segura (English)
The head of artisans at the Paige Workshop until Anne took over. Once he sees her skill, he also comes to respect Anne greatly. He is childhood friends with Bridget and cares about her.
King (キング, Kingu)
Voiced by: Kōji Okino
A sugar artisan at the Paige Workshop. Like the others, he holds great respect for Master Glen for giving him work despite his troubled past. He likes and respects Anne from the start.
Valentine (ヴァレンタイン, Varentain)
Voiced by: Atsushi Tamaru
A sugar artisan at the Paige Workshop. Like the others, he holds great respect for Master Glen. He likes and respects Anne from the start.
Nadil (ナディール, Nadīru)
Voiced by: Shōya Chiba
A sugar artisan at the Paige Workshop. Like the others, he holds great respect for Master Glen for giving him work even as a foreigner. He likes and respects Anne from the start.
Gladus/Lafalle (グラディス, Guradisu)
Voiced by: Soma Saito
A companion fairy that Bridget brought with her after losing Challe. It is later revealed that he is Challe's sibling named Laffale Fen Lafalle, born from an opal stone taken from the same sword that housed Challe's obsidian stone. While Challe was gazed upon by a human girl, he was gazed upon by an eagle. He is also the mysterious attacker targeting sugar artisans while searching for Anne and Challe. Obsessed with reuniting with Challe, he infiltrates the mansion through Bridget and kidnaps Anne in an attempt to steal Challe's wing. He declares his ambition to become the new Fairy King and reclaim fairy lands from humans. However, he seizes the wings of the fairies who follow him, making him no better than the humans he claims to oppose.
Noah (ノア, Noa)
Voiced by: Manaka Iwami
A mournful fairy who once served Lord Herbert of House Chamber. Years ago, House Chamber rebelled against the kingdom and was defeated, leading to the execution of all its members, the loss of their belongings, and the destruction of their crests. Lord Herbert was Noah's only friend, and despite Herbert urging him to flee, Noah remained in the abandoned mansion, unable to move on from his grief. After Anne creates a sugar confection for him, Noah finally finds closure, allowing Herbert's soul to pass on peacefully. He later begins assisting Anne during preparations for the Holy Beginnings Festival, gradually rediscovering a sense of purpose.

== Media ==
=== Light novels ===
The light novel is licensed in North America by Yen Press.

==== Volumes ====
No.	Title	Original release date	English release date
1	The Silver Sugar Master and The Obsidian Fairy; Gin Satō-shi to Kuro no Yōsei (銀砂糖師と黒の妖精)	March 31, 2010; 978-4-04-455007-3	October 4, 2022; 978-1-9753-5000-0
Chapter 1: The Scarecrow and the Fairy; Chapter 2: Reunion on the Bloody Highway; Chapter 3: Attack!; Chapter 4: An Evening at the Doctor's Inn; Chapter 5: The Sugar Apple Is a Deceitful Tree; Chapter 6: Born in the Morning; Chapter 7: What Became of the Royal Medal
2	The Silver Sugar Master and The Blue Duke; Gin Satō-shi to Ao no Kōshaku (銀砂糖師と青の公爵)	July 31, 2010; 978-4-04-455016-5	January 17, 2023; 978-1-9753-5097-0
Chapter 1: When the Snow Falls; Chapter 2: Summoned by the Duke of Philax; Chapter 3: Castle by the Sea; Chapter 4: A Forced Good-bye; Chapter 5: The Captive; Chapter 6: The Fairy in My Memories; Chapter 7: If I Keep My Eyes on You
3	The Silver Sugar Master and The Ivory Aristocrat; Gin Satō-shi to Shiro no Kikōshi (銀砂糖師と白の貴公子)	November 30, 2010; 978-4-04-455023-3	April 18, 2023; 978-1-9753-5099-4
Chapter 1: A Poor Harvest of Sugar Apples; Chapter 2: Radcliffe Workshop; Chapter 3: What I Need to Make; Chapter 4: The Legend of the Ancestor King and the Fairy King; Chapter 5: Making Everything Fair; Chapter 6: Misgivings; Chapter 7: Broken Sugar Candy
4	The Silver Sugar Master and The Green Workshop; Gin Satō-shi to Midori no Kōbō (銀砂糖師と緑の工房)	March 31, 2011; 978-4-04-455044-8	September 19, 2023; 978-1-9753-5101-4
Chapter 1: To Millsfield; Chapter 2: The Workshop Among the Lakes and Green Hills; Chapter 3: The First Silver Sugar; Chapter 4: One Again, Going After the Prize; Chapter 5: Sugar Candy for Someone; Chapter 6: Snow; Chapter 7: Glow of Celebration
5	The Silver Sugar Master and the Purple Promise; Gin Satō-shi to Murasaki no Yakusoku (銀砂糖師と紫の約束)	July 30, 2011; 978-4-04-455050-9	February 20, 2024; 978-1-9753-5103-8
Chapter 1: A Castle with No Crest; Chapter 2: The Pet Fairy; Chapter 3: Ghosts Are Nothing to Fear; Chapter 4: Rain and a Favor; Chapter 5: All Hands on Deck; Chapter 6: What the Fairy Saw; Chapter 7: A Contest Against the Silver Sugar Viscount
6	The Silver Sugar Master and The Crimson Kingdom; Gin Satō-shi to Aka no Ōkoku (銀砂糖師と赤の王国)	September 30, 2011; 978-4-04-455056-1	June 18, 2024; 978-1-9753-5105-2
Chapter 1: Back to Work; Chapter 2: The State Church's Anxiety; Chapter 3: One More Crafter; Chapter 4: Fairies and Humans; Chapter 5: The One Who Would Be Fairy King; Chapter 6: One Final Addition; Chapter 7: A New Dream
7	The Silver Sugar Master and the Yellow Garland; Gin Satō-shi to Ki no Kakan (銀砂糖師と黄の花冠)	December 28, 2011; 978-4-04-100091-5	November 19, 2024; 979-8-8554-0299-5
Chapter 1: The One Who Summoned Them; Chapter 2: The Silver Sugar Fairy; Chapter 3: Five Successors and One Last Intruder; Chapter 4: The Fairy's Apprentices; Chapter 5: Fading Power, Preserving Power; Chapter 6: Spindles and Silver Thread; Chapter 7: An Oath Between Fairy and Human
8	The Silver Sugar Master and the Gray Wolf; Gin Satō-shi to Hai no Ōkami (銀砂糖師と灰の狼)	March 31, 2012; 978-4-04-100222-3	June 10, 2025; 979-8-8554-0301-5
Chapter 1: Meeting at Silver Westol Castle; Chapter 2: A Wolf Carrying a Coffin; Chapter 3: The Price for a Sleeping Fairy; Chapter 4: Anne and the Wolf; Chapter 5: The Earl's Decision and the Viscount's Resolve; Chapter 6: Escape; Chapter 7: An Aged Lion and Invited Happiness
9	The Silver Sugar Master and the Rainbow Successors; Gin Satō-shi to Niji no Kōkei-sha (銀砂糖師と虹の後継者)	July 31, 2012; 978-4-04-100402-9	January 27, 2026; 979-8-8554-0303-9
Chapter 1: The Fairies' Workshop; Chapter 2: A Second Mistake; Chapter 3: A Seven-Day Promise; Chapter 4: Where to Go After Freedom; Chapter 5: Choosing Day; Chapter 6: The White Flowers of the Sugar Apple; Chapter 7: Ripples of Song
10	The Silver Sugar Master and the Water King; Gin Satō-shi to Mizu no Ōsama (銀砂糖師と水の王様)	September 29, 2012; 978-4-04-100502-6	July 14, 2026; 979-8-8554-0305-3
11	The Silver Sugar Master and the Golden Cocoon; Gin Satō-shi to Kin no Mayu (銀砂糖師と金の繭)	December 28, 2012; 978-4-04-100637-5	March 9, 2027; 979-8-8554-0307-7
12	Ōkoku no Gin Satō-shi-tachi (王国の銀砂糖師たち)	March 30, 2013; 978-4-04-100769-3	—
13	Gin Satō-shi to Kon no Saishō (銀砂糖師と紺の宰相)	September 1, 2013; 978-4-04-100975-8	—
14	Gin Satō-shi to Gin no Gādian (銀砂糖師と銀の守護者)	January 1, 2014; 978-4-04-101159-1	—
15	Gin Satō-shi to Hi no Sōran (銀砂糖師と緋の争乱)	May 1, 2014; 978-4-04-101528-5	—
16	Gin Satō-shi to Kuro no Yōsei-ō (銀砂糖師と黒の妖精王)	September 1, 2014; 978-4-04-101527-8	—
17	Gin Satō-shi-tachi no Mirai-zu (銀砂糖師たちの未来図)	February 1, 2015; 978-4-04-102331-0	—
18	Gin Satō-shi to Shinku no Yoake (銀砂糖師と深紅の夜明け)	December 28, 2022; 978-4-04-113299-9	—
19	Gin Satō-shi to Shikon no Rakuen (銀砂糖師と紫紺の楽園)	August 1, 2023; 978-4-04-113850-2	—
20	Gin Satō-shi to Kogane no Chikai (銀砂糖師と黄金の誓い)	March 1, 2024; 978-4-04-114708-5	—

=== Manga ===
A manga adaptation with art by Alto Yukimura was serialized online via Hakusensha's Hana to Yume Online website from November 2012 to October 2014. It was collected in two tankōbon volumes. A second manga adaptation with art by Yozora no Udon was serialized in Kadokawa Shoten's seinen manga magazine Young Ace from November 4, 2021, to December 4, 2023. The second manga is also licensed in North America by Yen Press, who are publishing new chapters simultaneously with the Japanese release.

A third manga adaptation with art by Konosagi has been serialized online via Kadokawa Shoten's Flos Comic website from August 4, 2023, to April 4, 2025. Three tankōbon volumes were released from January 17, 2024, to April 4, 2025.

==== 2012 manga ====
No.	Release date	ISBN
1	August 20, 2013	978-4-592-19771-3
2	October 20, 2014	978-4-592-19781-2

==== 2021 manga ====
No.	Original release date	Original ISBN	English release date	English ISBN
1	June 3, 2022	978-4-04-112484-0	April 18, 2023	978-1-9753-6732-9
2	December 28, 2022	978-4-04-113054-4	November 21, 2023	978-1-9753-7660-4
3	August 4, 2023	978-4-04-113516-7	September 17, 2024	978-1-9753-9193-5
4	March 4, 2024	978-4-04-114341-4	February 18, 2025	979-8-8554-1206-2

==== 2023 manga ====
No.	Release date	ISBN
1	January 17, 2024	978-4-04-683135-4
2	October 4, 2024	978-4-04-684111-7
3	April 4, 2025	978-4-04-684676-1

=== Anime ===
On October 1, 2021, an anime adaptation was announced. It was later revealed to be a television series produced by J.C.Staff and directed by Yōhei Suzuki, with scripts written by Seishi Minakami, character designs handled by Haruko Iizuka, and music composed by Hinako Tsubakiyama. The first part aired from January 6 to March 24, 2023, on AT-X, Tokyo MX, BS Asahi, Sun Television and KBS Kyoto. The second part aired from July 7 to September 22, 2023. On August 6, 2022, during their industry panel at Crunchyroll Expo, Crunchyroll announced their stream to the series outside of Asia. For the first part, the opening theme song is "Musical" (ミュージカル, Myūjikaru) by Minori Suzuki, while the ending theme song (for the episodes 2, 3 and 5 to 11) is "Kanaeru" (叶える; "To Grant") by Sumire Morohoshi. For the second part, the opening theme song is "Surprise" (サプライズ, Sapuraizu) by Rei Nakashima, while the ending theme song is "Door" by Nao Tōyama.

==== Episodes ====
No.	Title	Directed by	Written by	Storyboarded by	Original release date
Part 1
1	"The Scarecrow and the Fairy"; Transliteration: "Kakashi to Yōsei" (Japanese: かかしと妖精)	Miyuki Ishida	Seishi Minakami	Yōhei Suzuki	January 6, 2023
Anne Halford visits her mother Emma's grave and recalls the time she told her about fairies becoming slaves to humans and as a silver sugar master, she's obligated to treat them as equals. After returning to her village, Anne sets off for Lewiston to enter the Royal Candy Fair despite objections by her friend Jonas Anders since the journey there is dangerous. At the town of Redington along the way, Anne sees a fairy about to be killed by a fairy hunter by crushing his detached wing and saves the fairy while returning his wing allowing him to escape. Needing to find a fairy slave to be her bodyguard on the way to Lewiston, Anne purchases the warrior fairy Challe Fen Challe. Afterwards, Anne and Challe leave Redington for Lewiston traveling on the path nicknamed the Bloody Highway. On the first night, Anne and Challe camp out at a fortshelter with Anne informing Challe after the journey to Lewiston she intends to set him free. The next day, Anne and Challe are attacked by bandits, who are also attacking another wagon, and Challe defeats them.
2	"The Bloody Highway"; Transliteration: "Buradi Kaidō" (Japanese: ブラディ街道)	Yūki Morita	Seishi Minakami	Iku Suzuki	January 13, 2023
Anne meets up with Jonas again after Challe saved him from the bandits, and despite Anne's objection he accompanies her to Lewiston. At night, Anne meets Cathy, a fairy serving Jonas, and makes a meal for everybody. With Challe absorbing the food rather than eating it like a human does, she learns about what fairies eat as they can only taste silver sugar. Anne noticed somebody had snuck into her wagon. She goes in and finds the fairy she saved in Redington, Mithril Lid Pod, hiding in it. Mithril insists on returning the favor, but Anne is disinterested. Anne and Jonas continue their journey and on the next night, Anne formally introduces Challe to Jonas. The next day, Anne and Jonas are attacked by a pack of hungry crows and Challe defeats them. However, the attack delayed their travels and being unable to make it to the next fortshelter before nightfall, they stay at a nearby doctor's inn instead.
3	"The Sugar Apple Is the Tree of Betrayal"; Transliteration: "Satō Ringo wa Uragiri no Ki" (Japanese: 砂糖林檎は裏切りの木)	Kōzō Kaihō	Akiko Waba	Shinji Itadaki	January 20, 2023
At the doctor's inn, fellow guest and sugar artisan Hugh tasks Anne and Jonas with making confections in exchange for him paying for their stay. Despite producing good confections, Hugh criticizes Jonas for lacking ingenuity and Anne for lacking creativity. He smashes their confections but agrees to pay for their stay. At night, Challe recalls the time when he befriended a human girl named Elizabeth 15 years ago, but she was killed by humans leading to his distrust of humans. The next day, Anne prepares to make her entry confection, but discovers her supply of silver sugar has mysteriously vanished. With help from Jonas, she finds some sugar apples just in time to replenish her supply of silver sugar and make her entry piece. However, Jonas betrays Anne by having Cathy splatter Anne with blood from raw meat to attract a pack of wolves, forcing Challe to protect her. Jonas uses the distraction to steal Anne's wagon with her confection in it and make his getaway.
4	"The Fate of the Royal Medal"; Transliteration: "Ōke Kunshō no Yukue" (Japanese: 王家勲章の行方)	Akira Tanaka	Seishi Minakami	Yōhei Suzuki	January 27, 2023
A despair-ridden Anne goes into Jonas' wagon to find her missing supply of silver sugar, and learns from the blueprints he intended to enter a piece designed by her mother, and being unable to make it he resorted to stealing Anne's confection. Anne decides to return Challe's wing and set him free. But Challe refuses to leave and wanting Anne to keep her promise of making him a confection. The next morning, Anne meets a fairy named Lusul El Min, and makes another confection modeled off Lusul. Anne and Challe travel through the night and arrive in Lewiston right before the confections are judged. Anne learns the person she met at the doctor's inn is the silver sugar viscount Hugh Mercury. Anne and Jonas are ordered to present their confections to the king, and the king declares Jonas the winner. However, when Mithril appears, Anne explains the truth she made the winning confection and Jonas submitted it as his own. Hugh orders Anne and Jonas to make the confection Jonas submitted to prove Anne's accusation. Jonas struggles, and despite her best effort Anne is unable to reproduce her confection. As such, neither Anne nor Jonas could take credit for making the winning confection and the exhibition ends with no winner. Afterwards, Anne punishes Jonas by slapping him in the face. Despite having completed his task, Challe decides to stay with Anne wanting a confection from a silver sugar master, while Anne is determined to try again.
5	"Anne and the Cat's Sugar Confectionery"; Transliteration: "An to Neko no Satōgashiten" (Japanese: アンと猫の砂糖菓子店)	Miyuki Ishida, Shizuka Izumi	Yoriko Tomita	Kiyotaka Ōhata	February 3, 2023
Anne goes around the different shops owned by silver sugar masters in Lewiston, and ends up working at a shop owned by the silver sugar master Kat after being accused of destroying a confection after a thief tried to steal it. Despite not being at fault, Anne decides to help Kat make a replacement, seeing this as an opportunity to watch a silver sugar master in action. At the end of the day, Kat runs out of silver sugar, but Anne works through the night to replenish it so Kat can immediately get to work. Later in the day, the viscountess Clay visits the shop offering to buy the confection he's making for a cobbler's daughter at an exorbitant price, but Kat maintains his policy of not making confections for people he dislikes like Clay. As Clay leaves, Anne notices the thief is her servant. At night, the thief returns to steal the confection, but is caught as Anne had delivered the confection earlier and replaced it with a fake. The next day, Anne learns Kat's real name is Alph Hingley, a silver sugar master she greatly admires, as she and Challe set out for Westol, a place known for its cold weather.
6	"The Castle on the Sea"; Transliteration: "Umibe no Shiro" (Japanese: 海辺の城)	Miyuki Ishida, Akira Tanaka	Seishi Minakami	Iku Suzuki	February 10, 2023
Hugh presents the Earl of Downing with a confection and talks about Anne, who has returned to Lewiston in preparation for Pull Soul Day after struggling to get customers in Westol. To build her reputation and earn some money, Anne heads to Philax, a seaside town run by the Duke of Philax William Alburn, after being told William will pay a huge reward to the artisan who makes him the best confection regardless of whether or not the artisan is a silver sugar master. At the castle, Anne presents William with a confection modeled off Mithril and passes the first test. Afterwards, she is tasked with making a confection modeled off a fairy lady in a painting. As she heads off to the workshop, she runs into Jonas and two other students from the Radcliffe workshop, who accuse her of setting Jonas up at the festival. Anne spends the next few days working on the confection and just before completing it, she encounters Jonas again. Jonas already finished his confection and was chosen to be William's artisan. The next day, Anne presents her confection to William. Liking hers better than Jonas', William decides to have both Anne and Jonas stay at the castle to make him a confection.
7	"A False Farewell"; Transliteration: "Itsuwari no Sayonara" (Japanese: いつわりのさよなら)	Yūki Morita	Yoriko Tomita	Kiyotaka Ōhata	February 17, 2023
As Mithril informs Anne Jonas is having a mental breakdown, Anne produces a new version of the confection. However, William is not satisfied and vaguely instructs her to give it form. Anne produces a new confection having made several changes to it, but William deems it much worse than the last one and breaks it in anger. At night, Challe talks about Elizabeth in order to make her feel better. Anne returns to her room and sees Jonas taking hold of Mithril's detached wing. With Jonas threatening to break Mithril's wing to kill him, Anne sends Challe out of the castle by his order, while instructing her to not oppose anything Jonas says when meeting William. In the meeting with William, Anne makes a deal with William promising to stay until she makes the confection while allowing Jonas to leave after realizing the amount of abuse Jonas had endured by William. Meanwhile, outside the castle Challe runs into Hugh, who informs him that William has not been to Lewiston lately and viewing this as unfealty to the royal family, the Earl of Downing has sent soldiers to subjugate William and would likely lead to his death. Hugh arrives to convince William to go to Lewiston, but refuses. As the sun rises with Anne looking at the painting again, she notices she overlooked a critical detail of the fairy as she has both of her wings and thus, is not a slave.
8	"If I Keep Gazing at You"; Transliteration: "Anata o Mitsume Tsuzukereba" (Japanese: あなたを見つめつづければ)	Akira Tanaka	Akiko Waba	Yōhei Suzuki	February 24, 2023
Having discovered the fairy in the painting, Lealis Cil Eril or Christina as William named her, is not a slave, Anne asks William questions about her. William reveals Christina was a water fairy he was in love with, and she died recently. Meanwhile, as Hugh explains to Challe about Christina's death and how it led to William neglecting his duties as a duke, they run into the Earl of Downing. Hugh begs the Earl to call off the subjugation while Anne is still in the castle, but he refuses. Having snuck out of the castle, Mithril informs Challe the truth about Jonas forcing Anne to dismiss him from the castle and she wants him to return. Back in the castle, Anne decides to make her confection in front of William to get feedback as it is being made. Challe arrives to take Anne out of the castle, but Anne refuses to leave until finished. As the confection nears completion, William explains he hopes to bring Christina back by gazing at a confection of her, but Challe responds saying it is impossible. Hugh and the soldiers arrive at the castle, but at Challe's request they wait until Anne is finished. After putting the silver eyes in, Anne completes the confection and William has the confection he wanted. Afterwards, Anne is paid her reward and exits the castle, permitting the soldiers to go in and take William into custody. Back in Lewiston, Anne is told thanks to her confection, William has changed for the better and received a lenient punishment as a result. The Pull Soul Day festival begins as Anne prays for her deceased mother with a confection.
9	"The Radcliffe Workshop"; Transliteration: "Radokurifu Kōbō" (Japanese: ラドクリフ工房)	Kōzō Kaihō, Miyuki Ishida	Akiko Waba	Kentarō Suzuki	March 3, 2023
Nine months later, Anne returns to Lewiston to prepare for the Royal Candy Fair and runs into Kat along the way. Kat informs Anne about this year's unusually low crop yield of sugar apples, and harvesting by individuals is banned. In order to participate, Anne will need to make her own supply of silver sugar by temporarily residing at the Radcliffe workshop and having not been informed of the edict on purpose due to her reputation, she heads to the workshop. At the workshop, she meets up with Jonas and fellow artisan Sammy Jones, and Sammy bullies Anne until Keith Powell arrives to intervene. Needing to find a place for Challe to stay since he is not a labor fairy, Keith decides to make a confection modeled off Challe to allow him to stay. The next day after spending a night at the dormitory, Keith explains he helped Anne get in because his situation is similar to her's as he is the son of the previous silver sugar viscount Edward Powell. While Edward came from the Paige school, Keith chose to join the Radcliffe school instead in order to be treated like a regular artisan. Keith did not enter the exhibit while Edward was alive because winning would draw criticism for receiving special treatment, while losing would label him a big disappointment for failing to live up to his family's expectations. Afterwards, Keith privately tells Challe he wants to compete against a worthy opponent, which he sees in Anne and not in Sammy or Jonas, and this is likely Anne's last chance to win as due to her reputation, her competitors will likely do everything to stop Anne from acquiring sugar apples.
10	"The Young Lady of the Paige Workshop"; Transliteration: "Peiji Kōbō no Reijō" (Japanese: ペイジ工房の令嬢)	Yūki Morita	Yoriko Tomita	Kiyotaka Ōhata	March 10, 2023
Being the only woman in the workshop, Kat explains there are not many women artisans because of the physically demanding work involved in refining silver sugar. The workshop's headmaster and Jonas' uncle Marcus Radcliffe drops by ordering Kat and Elliott Collins, the acting headmaster of the Paige workshop, to oversee the refinement. Anne gets to work and struggles before encountering Elliott and Bridget Paige, the daughter of the Paige workshop headmaster Glen Paige and Elliott's fiancée. After working all day refining silver sugar, Anne gets food from Bridget, who expresses her skepticism about female artisans, and secures her supply of sugar apples for the exhibition. At night after Anne falls asleep, Challe goes out and runs into Bridget, and Bridget expresses her love for Challe, but Challe rejects her feelings. Six days later, Anne argues with Sammy over how to refine the sugar apples with Sammy disregarding quality before Keith takes Anne outside the workshop. Keith shows Anne his entry confection modeled off Challe as Anne figures out what her entry piece will be. As Anne looks out the window, she sees Bridget falling for Challe. Bridget explains to her the marriage with Elliott was arranged and she doesn't love him, and Challe made her heart race. Challe responds telling Bridget she must possess his wing and order him to fall in love with her.
11	"That Which Should Be Made"; Transliteration: "Tsukuru Beki Mono" (Japanese: つくるべきもの)	Shizuka Izumi, Kōzō Kaihō	Seishi Minakami	Kentarō Suzuki	March 17, 2023
At night, Jonas tells Anne he's making something he wants, which has Anne lost in thought figuring out her entry confection. The next day, Anne and Challe visit the cathedral and Anne takes note of the painting of the battle between the founding king Cedric and the fairy king Riselva Cyril Sash. Challe explains Cedric was once the fairy king's slave, but they became friends and desired harmony between humans and fairies. However, the humans and fairies hated each other and went to war with Cedric reluctantly killing the fairy king. Cedric created a confection of the fairy king to remember him hoping Cedric's vision of the world happens, which is why the royal family favors fairies for confections. Anne stares at Challe's wing giving her the inspiration needed to make her entry confection. Afterwards, Anne works on her confection and produces one with roses wrapped around Challe's wing. At night, Sammy orders Jonas to bring Anne into the workroom to see Radcliffe. However, it is actually a trap, where he and his guys hold them both hostage. Sammy tries to burn Anne's hands in a pot of boiling water, but Jonas escapes and alerts Challe, who manages to stop Sammy in time and forces Sammy and his guys to flee. Radcliffe drops by to apologize and has Jonas kicked out, but refuses to discipline Sammy due to his longtime apprentice reporting the incident leading to a heated argument, where Mithril accuses Sammy of using Jonas to lure Anne out and he lied to cover his involvement. Radcliffe refuses to listen and threatens to shut him up, but Challe calls him out being a rotten teacher for not discipling Sammy. Insulted, Radcliffe then orders Anne to leave the workshop and never come back.
12	"I Didn't Want to Let Go"; Transliteration: "Hanashitakunakatta" (Japanese: 離したくなかった)	Akira Tanaka	Seishi Minakami	Iku Suzuki	March 24, 2023
Anne leaves the workshop. After she falls asleep, Mithril informs Challe about Anne's supply of silver sugar being switched out with the mass-produced stuff made at the workshop. After being kicked out due to Sammy's assault, Jonas flees in terror. Challe returns to the workshop and looking for evidence to prove Anne's silver sugar was swapped. He approaches Bridget, who saw everything, however, she refuses to cooperate, even when Challe threatens to kill her. At the Royal Candy Fair the next day, Hugh is informed about the mass-produced silver sugar and has Radcliffe inspect the barrels in Anne's wagon to confirm the suspicion. Meanwhile, Challe makes a deal with Bridget by giving her his wing in exchange for her testimony. Anne responds to the allegation, saying her confection was made with her own silver sugar. Anne reveals her confection by orders of the king, and breaks off a piece of her confection offering it up to the royal family's fairy servant Clifford, who confirms Anne's confection was not made with mass-produced silver sugar. Bridget arrives to tell the king Sammy switched out the barrels, which Clifford confirms. Radcliffe is angered at Sammy for his actions and he removes him as his apprentice and disqualifies him. With Anne acquitted, the Royal Candy Fair continues and she is awarded the Royal Medal. Afterwards, Challe bids farewell to Anne as he is now Bridget's servant, and Elliott tells Anne Challe exchanged his freedom for her dream. Anne is left in shocked and despair upon hearing this and cries in vain for Challe to come back.
Part 2
13	"The Lake and the Green Workshop"; Transliteration: "Kosui to Midori no Kōbō" (Japanese: 湖水と緑の工房)	Akira Tanaka, Miyuki Ishida	Akiko Waba	Kentarō Suzuki	July 7, 2023
Elliott tells Anne that Challe and Bridget are returning to the Paige workshop in Millsfield due to Glen's heart condition. Taking Elliot's advice despite Keith's warning, Anne decides to go to Millsfield. At night, Hugh approaches Anne offering to use his authority as the viscount to pressure Bridget into returning Challe, but Anne declines determined to resolve this herself. The next day, Anne and Elliot travel to Millsfield together. Upon arrival, Anne meets Orland Langston, the workshop's head of artisans, and then sees Glen to ask him to work for the Paige Workshop. Bridget expresses her frustration she cannot become a silver sugar master due to her being the daughter of a school's master as Glen hires Anne to be the workshop's head of artisans due to the workshop's decline in orders with the promise to return Challe's wing if she successfully rebuilds the workshop. Refusing to accept this, an unhinged Bridget orders Challe to never see Anne again now in control of his wing. At night, Anne sneaks into the workshop and Challe comes in to meet Anne in secret against Bridget's orders. Anne tells Challe she wants to stay together with Mithril and she is determined to do everything herself to prove her worth as a silver sugar master, which he accepts by asking her to wait for him.
14	"Embarking on a Challenge Once Again"; Transliteration: "Futatabi, Idomu Toki" (Japanese: 再び、挑むとき)	Fumihiro Matsui, Kazuya Mihashi	Yoriko Tomita	Kiyotaka Ōhata	July 14, 2023
The next morning, Anne begins work as the new head of artisans at the Paige workshop, meeting her co-workers King, Nadir, Valentine, and Orland. Anne learns the artisans there have been working individually, creating what they want rather than working together with the focus on the clients. At night, Elliot shows Anne the debts the workshop owes as if the workshop cannot pay it soon, half of the workshop will be confiscated. The next day, Anne meets Challe in the workshop before opening, and Bridget comes in upset at Challe for disobeying her order and attempts to punish him by hurting his wing, but finds it missing. Elliot informs Bridget that Glen has taken possession of Challe's wing for safekeeping, much to her anguish. Sometime later, Keith and Radcliffe arrive to inform Anne about the selection process for the upcoming Holy Beginnings Festival, which is a prestigious honor that often leads to a huge boost in business for the selected workshop. Keith reveals to Anne that Jonas has not returned to his hometown, much to her concern. Keith tells Anne that his decision to join the Radcliffe workshop likely led to the decline of the Paige workshop. After everything she heard, Anne decides to have the workshop participate in the selection, but Glen orders Anne not to.
15	"Sugar Confections in the Service of Others"; Transliteration: "Dareka no Tame no Satōgashi" (Japanese: 誰かのための砂糖菓子)	Yūki Morita	Akiko Waba	Shinji Itadaki	July 21, 2023
Glen tells Anne to not participate due to the apparent bias against the workshop after the previous monarch introduced the selection. As the workshop was never chosen, Glen's father, the workshop's previous master, stopped participating in protest. After spending a day assigning the artisans to craft a confection, Glen tells Anne that he changed his mind and will have the workshop participate on the condition that if the workshop is not selected, Anne will be dismissed and Challe's wing will not be returned to her. In preparation for the selection, Anne discusses what to make and the workshop decides to research the winning workshops from previous selections. They consult Elliot, who provides them with journals of previous masters written in a language only Bridget can read. Anne approaches Bridget hoping to get her to read the journals in exchange for a bird confection she made, but she refuses. At night, Orland tells Anne he took Challe's wing and gave it to Glen, while also explaining why Bridget became the person she is now due to the fact that she cannot become an artisan as she would inherit the workshop and Glen feels the responsibilities are too much for her. The next day, Anne decides to make something with a snow motif having settled on making something to help Glen. Before the artisans get to work, they rush out after hearing a distress call and find Elliot wounded.
16	"The First Silver Sugar"; Transliteration: "Saisho no Gin Satō" (Japanese: 最初の銀砂糖)	Akira Tanaka	Yoriko Tomita	Kentarō Suzuki	July 28, 2023
As Elliot rests in bed to recover from his wounds, he describes the attacker with Challe concluding him to be another warrior fairy who is attracted to silver sugar. Nine days later, the workshop creates its entry confection, a shining tree made of snowflake confections. The artisans sets off for Lewiston at sunset with the confection with Challe protecting them, and along the way they encounter the attacker. Challe stays behind to fight him while Anne and the artisans continue to travel, the mysterious fairy tells Challe he wants the sugar confections and a silver sugar master, Anne and the artisans arriving at Lewiston in the morning. The Paige workshop competes against the Radcliffe and Mercury workshops at the selection, and Anne notices the lack of shine in her workshop's confection that she saw back at the workshop. After requesting the judge to provide lighting, the confection shows off its shine and the Paige workshop is selected to make confections for the Holy Beginnings Festival. Afterwards, Elliot returns Challe's wing to Anne and tells her she has created the first silver sugar, which is silver sugar that never goes bitter, and she is free to leave whenever she wants. Anne decides to stay with the workshop through the end of the festival, while Challe tells Anne that the attacker got away, but swears to kill him the next time they meet.
17	"The Castle with No Crest"; Transliteration: "Monshō Naki Shiro" (Japanese: 紋章なき城)	Yūki Morita	Seishi Minakami	Iku Suzuki	August 4, 2023
The Paige workshop sets up shop at the abandoned Holly Leaf Castle for the next two months to create sugar confections for the Holy Beginnings Festival. As Anne settles in, she hears voices coming from a ghost. The next morning, the artisans claim that their doors open even when they lock them to indicate the castle is haunted. Hugh makes a visit to tell the artisans that he will be regularly making unannounced visits to the castle to check the progress of the confections with the Mercury workshop taking over if progress is lacking. The artisans begin work, and then Bridget drops by with her new companion fairy Gladus, drawing criticism from Elliot as he accompanies her to see Glen. At night, Anne spots Bridget alone in the castle's courtyard as she is ordered to return Gladus by Glen, and worried that she will catch a cold, Anne gives her a blanket. Anne returns to the castle with Orland reminding her that creating the confections takes priority. Elsewhere in the castle, Challe and Gladus have a conversation and Gladus reveals that despite being born out of a precious stone, he is unable too weak to fight. Gladus says Challe is similar to him but won't tell what it is.
18	"Ghosts Aren't Scary"; Transliteration: "Yūrei Nanka Kowakunai" (Japanese: 幽霊なんかこわくない)	Miyuki Ishida	Akiko Waba	Yōhei Suzuki	August 11, 2023
The next day, Mithril decides to solve the mystery of the ghosts since the artisans are unable to focus. At night, Anne encounters the ghost, who is actually the fairy Noah belonging to the former head of House Chamber, Lord Herbert Chamber. House Chamber went to war with the Millsland royal family and lost, leading to the castle being annexed by Millsland and was stripped down afterwards after being donated to the Saint Lewiston Bell Church. Noah was ordered by Herbert to protect the castle until he returns. When Mithril tells him he's dead, Noah refuses to believe this and is adamant about waiting for him despite that he's never coming back. Elsewhere, Anne is met by Gladus, who shows to be very interested in her. Anne quickly leaves as Challe witnessed this. Gladus tells Challe that he knows about the place where Challe comes from, making Challe wonder who Gladus really is. Coming to the conclusion that Herbert wanted Noah to leave and that Noah has not eaten for 15 years, Anne feeds him a silver sugar confection hoping to get him to listen. Challe tells Anne he will be watching Noah as Anne falls asleep having a dream of the times Noah had with Herbert. When Herbert left the castle for good, he told Herbert to protect the castle and not eat anything other than what Herbert gave him. Later that night, an unexpected rainstorm arrives, and the artisans suffer a setback with the entire supply of silver sugar hardening from the rain's moisture.
19	"Wanting Even a Cat's Help"; Transliteration: "Neko no Te mo Karitai" (Japanese: 猫の手も借りたい)	Shizuka Izumi	Yoriko Tomita	Kentarō Suzuki	August 18, 2023
With time running short and the artisans needing to replenish their supply of silver sugar, Anne comes up with the idea to ask Kat to help out. Anne goes to Kat's workshop to ask for assistance, but he refuses opting to prioritize his customers instead. However, Anne remembers that Kat lost a bet with Hugh when Anne refused Hugh's help to get Challe back from Bridget in which Hugh gets to ask one favor out of Kat. Anne returns to Holly Leaf and challenges Hugh to a confection-making contest for the right to make that request, and Hugh accepts with the winner being the one making the confection that Noah eats. In looking for ideas as to what to make that Noah would approve, Anne decides on something that reminds Noah of Herbert. As she stares at a portrait of Herbert with his head ripped off, Gladus approaches Anne telling her that Challe refuses to open up to him and almost says why he and Challe are close to each other. After Gladus leaves with Bridget, Challe comes in telling Anne about something she cannot be seen, and that gives Anne the idea to look behind Herbert's portrait. Anne sees the only House Chamber crest remaining in the castle there, and she decides to make a confection of it.
20	"A Purple Promise"; Transliteration: "Murasaki no Yakusoku" (Japanese: 紫の約束)	Akira Tanaka, Miyuki Ishida	Akiko Waba	Akira Tanaka, Miyuki Ishida	August 25, 2023
Anne and Hugh present their confections as Anne makes a batch of the House Chamber crest, while Hugh makes a confection out of chess pieces of the game Noah used to play with Herbert. With Noah's strong reaction to the crest, he eats Anne's confection and Anne wins the challenge. Hugh explains that he tried to make the crest one time, but destroyed it because he is in service to the crown and that crest is considered taboo, while Anne responds by telling Hugh that what she makes is all about the recipient. While Anne rests alongside Noah, Bridget goes to see Gladus, who has taken Hugh's confection and eats it. Gladus explains to Bridget that he used her to infiltrate the workshop to replenish his strength. In response, Bridget crushes his wing, but he is unaffected since the wing belongs to different fairy. Gladus goes out to meet Challe and explains to him that his fairy name is Lafalle fenn Lafalle and he was born from the opal that originated from the same sword forgotten by time that Challe was born from. Lafalle explains the three stones were chosen specifically with the hope that something would be born from them by the sword's master. Lafalle demands that Challe joins him to fight back against the humans, but Challe refuses. Lafalle reveals that he is that red-haired fairy that attacked Elliot and will take Anne away from Challe by force. Challe rushes over to protect Anne before Lafalle gets to her.
21	"The Red Fairy"; Transliteration: "Akai Yōsei" (Japanese: 赤い妖精)	Akira Tanaka, Miyuki Ishida	Seishi Minakami	Shinji Itadaki	September 1, 2023
Lafalle wounds Orland that makes him unable to use his left eye, further putting the artisans behind schedule. With Bridget blaming herself for bringing the fairy into the castle that injured her childhood friend, Anne convinces her to think about what to do next. The other artisans continue their work as they re-grind the hardened silver sugar to make the confections. The next day, Noah agrees to help, while Elliot brings in Kat to uphold his part of the deal. Later in the day, Anne and Elliot return to Lewiston to meet the priest organizing the festival, and the priest presents an offer to Anne in which the Mercury Workshop takes over and the Paige Workshop will still get paid the reward. Anne declines, putting the workshop's reputation on the line. On the way out of Lewiston, Anne spots Jonas drunk on the street. Despite being cleared of any wrongdoing, Jonas has given up on being an artisan, but Anne convinces him to fill in for Orland and help make the confections for the festival. Back at the castle, Lafalle attacks again, threatening to kill Elliot unless Anne and Challe go along with him. Anne decides to go along with Lafalle's demand and hands him Challe's wing, they leave the castle as they now belonging to Lafalle.
22	"Fairies and Humans and..." Transliteration: "Yōsei to Hito to" (Japanese: 妖精と人と)	Fumihiro Matsui, Kazuya Mihashi	Yoriko Tomita	Kentarō Suzuki	September 8, 2023
Lafalle takes Anne and Challe to his stronghold in an abandoned fortress where he provides asylum for fairies. As Anne warms up beside a fireplace, Lafalle explains to Challe their origins, revealing that the sword that housed the stones they were born from belonged to the late fairy king: Riselva Cyril Sash, who envisioned that one of the fairies from the three stones will succeed him as fairy king, only they except a Diamond Fairy is yet to be born. Lafalle persuades Challe to join his cause to get revenge on the humans, liberate the fairies and reclaim the fairies kingdom, but Challe refuses. Meanwhile, as word gets out about the crisis the Paige Workshop is going through, Keith rushes over the castle to confront Elliot and criticize the workshop for working without Anne, unaware that Anne left so that work can continue. Having understood Anne's intent, he offers to help make confections for the festival. Back at the fortress, Lafalle kills a human to steal his barrel of silver sugar has Anne make a confection for him after threatening to kill her and take another member of the Paige Workshop hostage in her place. As Anne becomes increasingly worried about Challe, she runs away and meets several fairies that includes Lusul. She and the other fairies gave their wing to Lafelle believing that he will be the next fairy king, Anne is distraught they let Lafalle take their freedom, and they don't understand difference in someone promising freedom or taking it away. Challe drops in and tells the fairies that Anne gave him his wing back and Lafalle stole it to get them to think about where his loyalty lies. Anne and Challe are upset after what Lafalle told them.
23	"The One to Become the Fairy King"; Transliteration: "Yōsei Ō to Naru Mono" (Japanese: 妖精王となる者)	Yūki Morita	Akiko Waba	Yoshiaki Iwasaki	September 15, 2023
While pretending to help Lafalle steal silver sugar, Challe secretly punctures a hole in one of the barrels to leave a trail of silver sugar to the fortress. Back at the fortress, Lafalle is displeased with the confections Anne is making for him. Anne makes her usual confections for Lusul and the other fairies who serve Lafalle, Anne tells the fairies the concept of freedom. Meanwhile, Keith asks Jonas about his plans after the festival as he plans to return to his uncle's workshop, while Hugh picks up on the silver sugar trail Challe made. As Lafalle plans his first invasion for his revenge conquest, Challe questions his motives, pointing out that the reason he did not do anything until the present time is because he was captured and enslaved by humans, and not only hating humans but also hate and distrusts fairies because he was betrayed by them. Challe points out revenge and control are not something a fairy king should enjoy. After returning to the fortress, Lafalle sees that Anne made her normal confections for the other fairies causing him to get violent towards Anne. However, Challe arrives and asks the fairies to question of how Lafalle treats them and he is no different from the humans. Challe saves Anne and fight Lafalle. Challe tells Lafalle that he will never become the fairy king, as a king has no need of their freedom. Lafalle hurts Challe's wing and Challe tells Anne to run away.
24	"A New Form"; Transliteration: "Atarashii Katachi" (Japanese: 新しいかたち)	Akira Tanaka, Kōzō Kaihō, Miyuki Ishida, Shizuka Izumi	Seishi Minakami	Yōhei Suzuki	September 22, 2023
Anne returns with Lusul and two other fairies, asking them to help Challe, and Lusul swipes Challe's wing away from Lafalle, allowing Challe to fight back. With Hugh and his soldiers closing in, Lafalle falls to his presumed death and Challe gains possession of the wings, returning them to the fairies and setting them free. Anne and Challe return to Holly Leaf Castle, where the artisans, with help from Kat, Jonas, and Keith, have finished all the planned confections with ten days left before the festival. With time left, Anne decides to make more confections. Later on, Bridget tells Anne that her marriage with Elliot has been dissolved as Glen agrees to name Elliot his successor without getting married. During the night, Challe tells Anne about he and Lafalle were born from the stones gathered by Riselva to produce the next fairy king. Challe is unsure if he is the fairy king, it will come a time when he is going to be but that time isn't now. The Holy Beginnings Festival begins on the eve of the new year and Hugh tells Anne to think about her future reminding her that she has yet to accomplish anything as a silver sugar master. Elliot tells Anne that the Paige Workshop is in good hands and suggests that she leaves. Anne decides to leave the workshop, but is unsure about what she will do next. Anne, Challe and Mithril happily look at the confections glowing.

== See also ==
- The White Cat's Revenge as Plotted from the Dragon King's Lap, another light novel series whose manga adaptation is illustrated by aki
