= Rei Nakashima =

Rei Nakashima 中島 怜
- Born: November 27, 2004 (age 21); Seto, Aichi, Japan
- Genres: Anison
- Occupation: Singer
- Years active: 2023–present
- Label: FlyingDog
- Website: e-stonemusic.com/nakashimarei

Rei Nakashima (中島 怜, Nakashima Rei; born November 27, 2004) is a Japanese singer who is signed to FlyingDog and E-Stone Music. She made her debut in 2023 after winning a nationwide audition held by FlyingDog, with her debut single's title song being used as the opening theme to the second season of the anime television series Sugar Apple Fairy Tale. Her music was also featured in the anime series Train to the End of the World.

== Biography ==
Nakashima was born in Aichi Prefecture on November 27, 2004. Her mother named her after Ray Charles, whom she was a fan of. She spent her early life in Seto, Aichi, often accompanying her father during his overseas business trips. Her interest in anime started at an early age, as her mother was a fan of Clamp's works and had introduced her to Cardcaptor Sakura. She became a fan of the series, even humming the show's songs. She also became a fan of the anime series K-On!, noting how she shared a birthday with its protagonist Yui Hirasawa. While in junior high school, her singing impressed her music teacher, who encouraged her to apply for a music school. She started playing the guitar and taking vocal lessons while in high school.

While taking lessons at a music school, she saw a poster advertising InuCon, a talent audition organized by the FlyingDog music label. After seeing that the poster featured Sakura Kinomoto and with her being a fan of Cardcaptor Sakura, she decided to apply for the audition. During her audition, she sang an original song as well as a cover of "Ai Oboete Imasu ka" from the Macross series. Because of nervousness, she was not able to sing her original song well and she thought she had failed her audition. She was surprised to learn that she won the audition, beating over 1,000 other applicants.

Nakashima made her major debut in 2023 with the release of her first single "Surprise" (サプライズ); the song was used as the opening theme to the second season of the anime television series Sugar Apple Fairy Tale. She released her second single "GA-TAN GO-TON" on May 29, 2024; the song was used as the opening theme to the anime television series Train to the End of the World.

== Discography ==
=== Singles ===
- "Surprise" (サプライズ) (July 19, 2023)
- "GA-TAN GO-TON" (May 29, 2024)
