= Erisa Kuon =

Japanese voice actress and singer

- 久遠 エリサ
- Born: 17 July 1996 (age 30)
- Occupations: Voice actress; singer
- Years active: 2018–present
- Employer: 81 Produce
- Notable work: My Isekai Life as Surahappa; Train to the End of the World as Reimi Kuga

Erisa Kuon (Japanese: 久遠 エリサ, Hepburn: Kuon Erisa; born 17 July 1996) is a Japanese voice actress and singer from Kanagawa Prefecture, affiliated with 81 Produce. Born in the Philippines, she was inspired to go into voice acting after being injured while as a member of a junior high school track and field club, and she has starred as Surahappa in My Isekai Life and as Reimi Kuga in Train to the End of the World.

== Biography ==
Erisa Kuon was born on 17 July 1996 in the Philippines, spending her time there and in Amami Ōshima during her youth, and is a native of Kanagawa Prefecture. She was part of a track and field club in junior high school, but suffered from a leg injury. While recovering, she learned about the background of voice actors and their junior years and felt inspired after seeing how unfettered they were in pursuing their dreams. Because of this, she decided to become a voice actor. Subsequently, she voiced Madoka Ishii in Kira Kira Happy Hirake! Cocotama and Jemima and Marnya in The Promised Neverland.

In 2022, she starred as Surahappa in My Isekai Life, and she performed the anime's ending theme "Gohan da yo! Dadadadan!!" as part of the tie-in unit Surachanzu. In July 2023, it was announced that she would star as Reimi Kuga in Train to the End of the World.

Outside of voice acting, she is also part of the kamishibai group Hanasaki Roman Musume.

== Filmography ==
=== Television animation ===
Year	Title	Role	Ref.
2018	100 Sleeping Princes and the Kingdom of Dreams	Customer C	
2018	Harukana Receive	Girl 2	
2018	Kira Kira Happy Hirake! Cocotama	Madoka Ishii	
2018	Ongaku Shōjo	Ongaku Shōjo fan	
2018	Rascal Does Not Dream of Bunny Girl Senpai	Schoolgirl	
2019	Cardfight!! Vanguard	Student	
2019	Hitori Bocchi no Marumaru Seikatsu	Girl B	
2019	The Promised Neverland	Jemima, Marnya	
2022	My Isekai Life	Surahappa	
2024	Train to the End of the World	Reimi Kuga	

=== Original net animation ===
Year	Title	Role	Ref.
2019	Kemono Friends 3	Malay Baku	

=== Video games ===
Year	Title	Role	Ref.
2019	Kemono Friends 3	Malay Baku	
2019	Quiz RPG: The World of Mystic Wiz	Gin (childhood)	

=== Dubbing ===
==== Live-action ====
- The Healing Powers of Dude as Destiny (Vanessa Przada)

==== Animation ====
- Thomas & Friends: All Engines Go as Terence the Tractor
